= List of British films of 1926 =

A list of British films released in 1926.

== 1926 ==
Title	Director	Cast	Genre	Notes
1926
The Ball of Fortune	Hugh Croise	Billy Meredith, Mabel Poulton, James Knight	Sports	
Blinkeyes	George Pearson	Betty Balfour, Patrick Aherne, Frank Stanmore	Drama	
The Chinese Bungalow	Sinclair Hill	Matheson Lang, Genevieve Townsend, Juliette Compton	Drama	
Cinders	Louis Mercanton	Betty Balfour, André Roanne, Jean Mercanton	Comedy	
Every Mother's Son	Robert Cullen	Rex Davis, Jean Jay, Moore Marriott	Drama	
The Flag Lieutenant	Maurice Elvey	Henry Edwards, Lilian Oldland, Dorothy Seacombe	War	
Forbidden Cargoes	Fred LeRoy Granville	Peggy Hyland, Clifford McLaglen, James Lindsay	Adventure	
The House of Marney	Cecil Hepworth	Alma Taylor, John Longden, James Carew	Crime	
If Youth But Knew	George A. Cooper	Godfrey Tearle, Lillian Hall-Davis, Mary Odette	Romance	
The Island of Despair	Henry Edwards	Matheson Lang, Marjorie Hume, Jean Bradin	Drama	
The Little People	George Pearson	Mona Maris, Frank Stanmore, Gerald Ames	Romance	
London	Herbert Wilcox	Dorothy Gish, Adelqui Migliar, Elissa Landi	Drama	
London Love	Manning Haynes	Fay Compton, John Stuart, Miles Mander	Drama	
Mademoiselle from Armentieres	Maurice Elvey	Estelle Brody, John Stuart, Alf Goddard	War	
Mons	Walter Summers		War	Documentary reconstruction
Nell Gwyn	Herbert Wilcox	Dorothy Gish, Randle Ayrton, Juliette Compton	Historical	
Nelson	Walter Summers	Cedric Hardwicke, Gertrude McCoy, Frank Perfitt	Historical	
One Colombo Night	Henry Edwards	Godfrey Tearle, Marjorie Hume, Nora Swinburne	Drama	
Palaver	Geoffrey Barkas	Haddon Mason, Reginald Fox	Adventure	
Pearl of the South Seas	Frank Hurley	Eric Bransby Williams, Lilian Douglas	Drama	
The Qualified Adventurer	Sinclair Hill	Matheson Lang, Genevieve Townsend	Adventure	
Safety First	Fred Paul	Brian Aherne, Queenie Thomas	Comedy	
Sahara Love	Sinclair Hill	Edward O'Neill, Gordon Hopkirk	Drama	Co-production with Spain
The Sea Urchin	Graham Cutts	Betty Balfour, George Hackathorne	Romance	
Thou Fool	Fred Paul	Stewart Rome, Marjorie Hume	Drama	
Tons of Money	Frank Hall Crane	Leslie Henson, Flora le Breton	Comedy	
The Triumph of the Rat	Graham Cutts	Ivor Novello, Isabel Jeans, Nina Vanna	Drama	
Walter Tells the Tale	James B. Sloan	Walter Forde, Pauline Peters	Comedy	
White Heat	Thomas Bentley	Juliette Compton, Wyndham Standing, George Bellamy	Drama	
The Woman Juror	Milton Rosmer	Gladys Jennings, Alexander Field	Drama	
The Woman Tempted	Maurice Elvey	Juliette Compton, Warwick Ward	Drama	
The Wonderful Wooing	Geoffrey Malins	Marjorie Hume, Genevieve Townsend	Drama	

== See also ==
- 1926 in British music
- 1926 in film
- 1926 in the United Kingdom
