= The Chinese Bungalow =

The Chinese Bungalow may refer to:

- The Chinese Bungalow (play)
- The Chinese Bungalow (1926 film)
- The Chinese Bungalow (1930 film)
- The Chinese Bungalow (1940 film)
