= 1926 in British music =

This is a summary of 1926 in music in the United Kingdom.

== Events ==
- c. May – Socialist composer Rutland Boughton stages a performance of his Nativity opera Bethlehem (1915) at Church House, Westminster, in a staging explicitly referencing the 1926 United Kingdom general strike.
- 6 May – In the midst of the General Strike, a concert of Leos Janácek's work is held at the Wigmore Hall, attended by the composer himself.
- 20 October – Ethel Smyth's opera Entente Cordiale receives its first public stage performance in Bristol, having been premièred by students at the Royal College of Music the previous year.
- November – Gertrude Lawrence becomes the first British performer to star in a US musical on Broadway, starring in Oh, Kay!.
- 8 December – The premiere of Dame Ethel Smyth's Sonata in A minor for cello and piano is held in London, nearly 40 years after the work was composed.
- 14 December – The mother of teenage composer Benjamin Britten brings his work to the attention of Charles Macpherson.
- 17 December – Composer John Ireland marries Dorothy Phillips, thirty years his junior, at Chelsea Register Office.
- 26 December – Granville Bantock's incidental music for Macbeth is used for the first time, in a production at the Prince Theatre, London, starring Sybil Thorndike.
- date unknown
  - Operatic baritone Leslie Rands marries his D'Oyly Carte co-star Marjorie Eyre.
  - Eugène Goossens, fils, joins the British National Opera Company as a conductor.
  - Sir Walford Davies resigns his professorship at University College, Aberystwyth.
  - The Webber Douglas School of Singing and Dramatic Art is founded by Walter Johnstone Douglas and Amherst Webber in London.
  - Organist and composer Herbert Brewer receives a knighthood.

== Popular music ==
- Eric Coates – "By The Tamarisk"

== Classical music: new works ==
- Arnold Bax – Symphony No. 2 in E minor and C major
- Rutland Boughton – The Queen of Cornwall, overture
- John Ireland – Three Songs, 1926
- Ralph Vaughan Williams
  - On Christmas Night (ballet)
  - Piano Concerto in C (movements 1 and 2)
- Six Studies in English Folk Song
- Gerald Tyrwhitt – The Triumph of Neptune (ballet)
- Peter Warlock – Capriol Suite

== Opera ==
- Ernest Bryson – The Leper’s Flute, with libretto by Ian Colvin

== Musical theatre ==
- May – Yvonne by Percy Greenbank, Jean Gilbert and Vernon Dukelsky, opens at Daly's Theatre, London.

== Births ==
- 3 January – Sir George Martin, record producer (died 2016)
- 21 January – Brian Brockless, organist, composer, and conductor (died 1995)
- 11 February – Alexander Gibson, conductor and founder of the Scottish Opera (died 1995)
- 20 February – Gillian Lynne, choreographer (died 2018)
- 14 March – Lita Roza, singer (died 2006)
- 31 May — Duncan Campbell, trumpeter (died 2013)
- 2 July – Morag Beaton, operatic soprano (died 2010)
- 18 July – Bryan Johnson, singer (died 1995)
- 17 August – George Melly, jazz singer (died 2007)
- 17 November – Robert Earl, singer (died 2025)
- 30 December – Stan Tracey, jazz pianist and composer (died 2013)

== Deaths ==
- 8 June – John Hornsey Casson, hymn-tune composer, 82
- 12 July – Charles Wood, composer, 60
- 17 October – Horton Claridge Allison, pianist and composer, 80
- 2 November – John Le Hay, Irish-born musical comedy performer, 72
- 4 November – Robert Newman, co-founder of the Proms, 68

== See also ==
- 1926 in the United Kingdom
- List of British films of 1926
