= Rodewald Concert Society =

British music society

The Rodewald Concert Society is an English unincorporated members' society which promotes musical education and chamber music in Merseyside, now part of Liverpool City Region. It was founded in 1911 as the Rodewald Concert Club, in memory of Alfred Edward Rodewald, a well known amateur conductor in Liverpool with a national reputation. Its founding chairman was composer Ernest Bryson, and its first honorary president was Sir Charles Villiers Stanford. Its first concert was given by the Rawdon-Briggs String Quartet at the former Carlton Restaurant, Eberle Street, Liverpool, on 16 October 1911. It changed its name to the Rodewald Concert Society in 1916; it is today a registered charity.

== History ==
=== Background ===
Rodewald was a Liverpool cotton merchant known as conductor of the Liverpool Orchestral Society and a public speaker about music. A supporter of new music and of making music available to all citizens, not just the upper classes, he died on 9 November 1903 after a short illness, aged 41. His close friend, Sir Edward Elgar had rushed to Liverpool to see him but was too late. Mourners at his funeral included Harry Plunket Greene, Ernest Bryson, Eugène Goossens, Mrs Richter (representing her husband Hans Richter), Samuel Smith MP, Theodore Von Sobbe (president of the Liverpool Philharmonic Society) and Mr De Ybarrando (director of New Brighton Tower). Elgar did not attend on the order of his doctor.

Rodewald had been preparing a concert; this was taken over by Hans Richter, and became a memorial concert. An Appreciation was written for the programme book by Ernest Newman with written tributes from others including Sir Granville Bantock, who said "We must not allow his memory to fade", and Richter, who said "We shall scarcely see the like of him again".

In 1911, three of Rodewald’s friends - Bryson (like Rodewald, a cotton broker but better known as an organist and composer), Arthur Wormald Pollitt (an organist and teacher and later to become chorus master of the Liverpool Philharmonic Choir and first lecturer in music at the University of Liverpool), and H Ernest Roberts (a businessman and an authority on chamber music and medieval monasteries) - decided to found a chamber music society in his memory. The Liverpool Orchestral Society had only survived a few years following Rodewald's death, so they decided that setting up an orchestra was not practicable.

=== Initial concept ===
An inaugural meeting was held on 27 April 1911 to form a society to be called 'Rodewald Concert Club' where the object would be "the holding of Chamber Concerts of an informal, social character". Bryson suggested there should be performances of string quartets and other chamber music and revival of old English madrigals and lectures upon musical subjects. The proposal was supported by Thomas Anselm Burge (a parish priest and an authority on church music as well as chamber music, later appointed Abbot of Westminster Cathedral), who pointed out the lack of a club in Liverpool for musical people. James Lyon (a composer and teacher and an authority on Manx folk song) announced that the project had the support of Sir Charles Villiers Stanford (a composer and conductor who became its first President) and Harry Plunket Greene (a famous baritone of the day), on the understanding that Rodewald's name was associated with it. An interim committee was elected comprising:-

- Mr R. E. Bryson – Chairman
- Dr A. W. Pollitt – Hon. Treasurer
- Mr H. Ernest Roberts – Hon. Secretary (who served for nearly half a century until his death)
- Mr Herbert Blenkarn – Hon. Accompanist
- Rev Fr Burge
- Dr W. E. Livsey

Sir Charles Villiars Stanford was to be invited to become President.

=== A members’ society governed by a committee of volunteers (1911-1976) ===
At the first AGM on 13 July 1911, the first set of rules were adopted stating: “The primary object of the Club shall be to provide for the performance of Chamber Music under informal and social conditions”. The interim committee was elected, joining “A committee consisting of President, Chairman, Hon. Treasurer, Hon. Secretary and six other Members”. Dr C. W. Hayward (a surgeon, who was also called to the bar at Gray’s Inn, and an amateur musician, poet, and writer) and John Cheshire (a printer who later became managing director of Lever Brothers, and leader and conductor of Port Sunlight Philharmonic Society) were also elected to the committee. Sir Charles Villiers Stanford was elected as the Society’s first President. In 1916, William Rushworth was elected as ‘Joint Secretary’ and it was probably then that concert management was taken over by the firm of Rushworth and Dreaper. The name was also changed to ‘Rodewald Concert Society’ (RCS). A Patrons’ Fund was set up in 1928 at 1 guinea above the normal subscription.

After Sir Charles Villiers Stanford died in March 1924, RCS officers wrote to Elgar, inviting him to become the society's president. Elgar refused, upset that the wishes of his close friend had been betrayed. He replied:

"I am much honoured by the invitation; I cannot accept the post of president. Alfred Rodewald was a very dear friend and if it were possible to carry on, under his name, some orchestral concerts I would be proud to be associated with the executive. Chamber music, in this case, is inadequate and it is a reproach to the musical taste of Liverpool that the orchestral concerts should have been allowed to disappear."

The RCS then invited Bryson to become president, sharing Elgar's letter. Bryson accepted the presidency but described Elgar as combining "stupidity and impertinence" in his reply to the society.

The Liverpool Music Society amalgamated with the RCS in 1936 and in 1938 new rules were adopted whereby the President and a committee comprising not less than five nor more than nine members were elected, with officers appointed by the committee. Also, a rule was added relating to use of funds on dissolution to satisfy the requirements of HM Customs and Excise and the National Federation of Music Societies (now known as Making Music) which had recently been set up to distribute certain grants.

In 1944, concerts were moved to Liverpool's Philharmonic Hall resulting in a four-fold increase in audience size. Cheap students’ seats were introduced. Larger audiences enabled more ambitious programme planning in the following years.

New rules adopted in 1955 stated that concerts were "for the furtherance of Musical Culture and Musical Education". The rule on dissolution was expanded stating property would be transferred to an organisation with a similar objective or to the Musicians Benevolent Fund (now known as Help Musicians). The RCS registered as a charity in 1964 (No 236406). In 1968, Rushworth & Dreaper downsized their business, and concert management was taken over by the Royal Liverpool Philharmonic Society (RLPS).

=== Governance by a committee of elected volunteers and people appointed by the RLPS (1976-2008) ===
In 1976, the RCS got into severe financial difficulty and sought help from the RLPS (a bequest from the late Miss Isabel Brash came too late), Rules were revised so that the Chairman was appointed by the RLPS and Vice-Chairman, Treasurer and Programme Secretary appointed by and from the committee. A further change in 1978 allowed the Chairman, Vice-Chairman, and Treasurer to be appointed by the committee and a General Secretary to be appointed by the General Manager of the RLPS. Three members of the committee were to be appointed by the management committee of the RLPS and three elected by members at the AGM.

In 1983, a new constitution was adopted giving more independence from the RLPS but with a general secretary appointed from the administrative staff of the RLPS. In 1992, RCS activities were suspended due to lack of funds, while the RLPS was also in severe financial difficulties.

In 1998, Nicholas Cox and Hilary Browning (from the RLPO) negotiated with the Chairman to make an application to Arts Council England (ACE) for a grant to fund concerts of contemporary music. These would be given by Ensemble 10/10 (which they had founded) under the name of the RCS rather than RLPS; a fund to promote new music was not open to portfolio organisations such as the RLPS, which were funded separately by ACE. This grant application was successful and the concerts were organised by Nicholas Cox and paid for by the RCS from its grant in seasons 1998 to 2000, allowing it to function again.

An EGM was held on 25 March 1999 to relaunch the RCS. Three concerts were organised in association with the Endellion Quartet who agreed to play for box office income rather than a fixed fee as the Society had not yet built-up sufficient funds to cover any possible loss.

In season 2000-01, the RCS was able to promote six concerts with sponsorship from Rensburg’s. Three concerts given by Ensemble 10/10 were also promoted in association with the Liverpool Institute for Performing Arts (LIPA). In season 2001-02, RCS was able to promote eight concerts, one in association with Liverpool Hope University and four as part of the RLPS Schumann Festival.

It was agreed in 2003 that chamber music concerts would be promoted jointly by the RCS and the RLPS, with the RCS making a financial contribution towards artists’ fees.

In 2004, the RCS and the RLPS agreed to submit a joint application to the Heritage Lottery Fund in order to lodge and catalogue the archives of both Societies at the Liverpool Record Office and make them available for public research. This was successful and a professional archivist was appointed in 2005 for three years to implement the project with some voluntary help. In 2005 the RCS set up its ‘Sounds Creative’ scheme to raise funds for commissioning new chamber music.

In 2008, a blue plaque commemorating Alfred Rodewald was unveiled in Huskisson Street, Liverpool, by John McCabe, honorary president of the RCS.

== Education ==
Education has been a part of RCS activities from its inception (Rodewald was known for his public lectures on music; at the inaugural meeting, lectures on musical subjects, as well as concerts, were envisaged). The society's second event was a lecture-recital given by baritone, Harry Plunket Greene. The first rules only specified that chamber music concerts were to be given "under informal and social conditions". Education was not specifically included as part of the object of the society in its rules until 1955, when the rule on dissolution was also expanded in more detail. These changes were linked to the avoidance of tax on a legacy.

The most significant educational development was the introduction of exceptionally cheap seats for students, which were marketed through schools in 1944 and attracted significant support. There have been only two specific educational projects since then: regular Play Days for amateur ensembles with professional tuition, and financial support for various projects at the University of Liverpool in Session 2016-17.

== Artists ==
At first, concerts were given by local musicians, initially the Rawdon-Briggs String Quartet, then principals of the Liverpool Philharmonic Orchestra, who were succeeded by the Catterall Quartet and, later, by the original Brodsky Quartet from Manchester. Since the 1930s, the Society has brought internationally famous chamber music ensembles to Liverpool, including the Léner, Prague, Griller, Hungarian, Amadeus, Camilleri, Janáček, Smetena, Melos, Borodin, new Brodsky, Škampa, Belcea and Pavel Haas string quartets. Other chamber groups have included the Robert Masters Piano Quartet, Melos Ensemble, Beaux Arts Trio, and the Florestan Trio. Recitalists have included: Harriet Cohen, Albert Sammons, Dennis Brain, Yfrah Neaman, Stephen Hough, Ian Bostridge, Radu Lupu, Midori, Andreas Scholl, Tasmin Little, Wolfgang Holzmair, Mark Padmore, Paul Lewis, and Nikolai Demidenko.

== Commissions ==
The Society has a record of commissioning new works, made possible through grant aid. The first commission was from Judith Weir, in partnership with the South East Arts Association, to celebrate the 150th Anniversary of the RLPS, and the Endellion Quartet as Quartet-in-Residence for the South East Arts Association. A previous attempt to commission a string quartet from Benjamin Britten had failed because he was fully committed with other commissions. To assist with commissioning, a special fund-raising scheme was set up, known as 'Sounds Creative'. The second commission was for a Clarinet Quintet from Hugh Wood, to celebrate Liverpool as European Capital of Culture in 2008.

Two commissions were made in 2012 to celebrate the Society's Centenary, a Horn Quintet from John McCabe, its President, and a Clarinet Quintet from Emily Howard. Another initiative that year was planning an experimental concert featuring the Smith Quartet with electronics. Matthew Fairclough from the University of Liverpool and Ian Percy from Liverpool Hope University were invited to compose works for the occasion. The concert took place at Liverpool Hope University on 1 December 2012. Also, in 2012, a postgraduate student and local resident, Louis Johnson, was invited to compose a work to celebrate the 150th anniversary of Rodewald's birth. This was performed by the Ensemble of St Luke's in the former Carnatic House, opposite Rodewald's birthplace in Mossley Hill, on 29 January 2012.

In 2014 Ian Stephens, from West Kirby, Wirral, was commissioned to compose an Oboe Quintet in memory of two former committee members who were brilliant amateur oboists. In 2017, Timothy Jackson, Principal Horn of the RLPO as well as a composer, was commissioned to write a sextet for the Pixels Ensemble for performance at a lunchtime concert in the Leggate Theatre of the University on 22 March 2017.

== Honorary Presidents ==
- Sir Charles Villiers Stanford 1911-1924
- Ernest Bryson 1926-1942
- Sir Thomas Beecham 1944-1961
- Sir Adrian Boult 1961-1983
- Walter Weller 1983-?
- John McCabe 2008-2015

== Sources ==
=== Primary source ===
Archives-Liverpool Record Office, 3rd Floor Central Library, William Brown Street, Liverpool, L3 8EW.

This is the public location of the Rodewald Concert Society Archives (Ref 780 RCS), which may be viewed by appointment or photocopies of individual documents may be purchased through the online catalogue.

The archives of the RCS were originally housed at the Liverpool Philharmonic Hall along with those of the Royal Liverpool Philharmonic Society. Unfortunately they were not properly maintained and, over the years, they had become mixed up. In 2004, with the assistance of the City Archivist, a joint application was made by the two societies for Heritage Lottery Funding to allow the appointment of a professional archivist for a three-year period in order to sort and separately catalogue the archives of the two societies and to make them available to the public for historical research at the Liverpool Record Office. This application was successful and an archivist was appointed in 2005. The two archives, Refs 780 PHI and 780 RCS, were publicly launched with a joint exhibition of key items in Liverpool Central Library on 25 February 2008.

=== Secondary sources ===
- The online catalogue of the Rodewald Concert Society archives, Liverpool Record Office, Ref 780 RCS
- G Douglas Bell from notes of the late H Ernest Roberts, 'Rodewald Concert Society Jubilee 1911-1961', published by the Rodewald Concert Society, 1961
- B. B. Benas, 'A History of Orchestras on Merseyside', Transactions of the Historic Society of Lancashire and Cheshire, Vol 95 (1942), pp 103-117.
- J. E. Kelly, Elgar's Best Friend: Alfred Rodewald of Liverpool, Lancaster, Carnegie Publishing Ltd, 2013, (Kelly)
- D. Henley & V. McKernan. The Original Liverpool Sound: The Royal Liverpool Philharmonic Story, Liverpool, Liverpool University Press, 2009
- S. de B. Taylor, Two Centuries of Music in Liverpool, Liverpool, Rockliff Brothers Ltd, 1976
