= The Wonderful Story =

The Wonderful Story may refer to:

- The Wonderful Story, a 1921 British short story by I.A.R. Wylie
- The Wonderful Story (1922 film), a silent film directed by Graham Cutts
- The Wonderful Story (1932 film), a film directed by Reginald Fogwell
