= The Jungle Woman =

1926 film

- Directed by: Frank Hurley
- Written by: Frank Hurley
- Produced by: Frank Hurley
- Starring: Eric Bransby Williams
- Cinematography: Frank Hurley; Walter Sully
- Edited by: W.G. Saunders
- Production company: Stoll Picture Productions
- Release date: 22 May 1926
- Running time: 6,070 feet
- Country: Australia
- Language: English
- Budget: £5,000

The Jungle Woman is a 1926 Australian film directed by Frank Hurley. It was shot partly on location in Thursday Island back to back with another Hurley feature, The Hound of the Deep (1926).

== Plot ==
Englishman Martin South (Eric Bransby Williams) is leading an expedition into the Dutch New Guinea hinterland to search for gold, being joined by George Mardyke (Jameson Thomas), who he thinks is his friend. The expedition is attacked by headhunters and Mardyke leaves Martin for dead so he can pursue the latter's fiancée, Eleanor (Lillian Douglas), the daughter of a plantation manager.

Meanwhile, Martin is nursed back to health by native girl, Hurana (Grace Savieri), who falls in love with him and helps him escape from some angry natives. Hurana is bitten by a snake and dies, and Martin arrives back to civilisation in time to rescue Eleanor from Mardyke.

== Cast ==
- Eric Bransby Williams as Martin South
- Grace Savieri as Hurana
- Jameson Thomas as George Mardyke
- Lillian Douglas as Eleanor
- W.G. Saunders as Peter Mack

== Production ==
After the disappointing reception to his documentaries in America, Hurley decided to go into dramatic feature films. He succeed in persuading the Australian-born British theatre magnate Sir Oswald Stoll to provide £10,000 and several actors and technicians to make two films in Papua and Thursday Island.

Hurley made The Hound of the Deep on Thursday Island then intended to shoot Jungle Woman in Papua. However the Australian government refused him permission to film there. This forced Hurley to instead make the movie at Merauke in Dutch New Guinea.

== Release ==
The film was not released before The Hound of the Deep although it was made beforehand. It was a popular success at the box office in Australia and Britain and proved profitable.
