= Rodewald (surname) =

Rodewald is a surname. Notable people with the surname include:

- Alfred Edward Rodewald (1862–1903), British musician and merchant
- Jack Rodewald (born 1994), Canadian ice hockey player
- Marion Rodewald (born 1976), German field hockey player
