= Young Lochinvar =

1923 film

- Directed by: W. P. Kellino
- Written by: Walter Scott (poem); Alicia Ramsey
- Starring: Owen Nares; Gladys Jennings; Dick Webb; Cecil Morton York
- Cinematography: Basil Emmott
- Production company: Stoll Pictures
- Distributed by: Stoll Pictures
- Release date: October 1923
- Running time: 5,500 feet
- Country: United Kingdom
- Languages: Silent; English intertitles

Young Lochinvar is a 1923 British silent historical drama film directed by W. P. Kellino and starring Owen Nares, Gladys Jennings, and Dick Webb. The screenplay was based on J. E. Muddock’s 1896 novel Young Lochinvar, A Tale of the Border Country, which was based on Canto V, XII of the poem Marmion by Walter Scott.

== Plot ==
In 15th century Scotland, a young knight, Lochinvar, was betrothed from birth to Cecilia, daughter of Johnstone of Lockwood. Helen is betrothed to Musgrave, a man she does not love. Lochinvar and Helen meet and fall in love, and Musgrave is wounded by Cecilia's brother Alick. Helen doesn't want to marry Musgrave, and as the date of her wedding draws near she sends a message to Lochinvar to help her.

Lochinvar arrives at Helen's wedding, asking for a dance. He sweeps her off her feet and onto his horse, and rides away with her. The couple are married at Lochinvar's home. Helen's family follows, and threaten violence, but Musgrave arrives, states that Lochinvar and Helen are in love, and he wishes them a happy life.

== Cast ==
- Owen Nares as Lochinvar
- Gladys Jennings as Ellen Graeme
- Dick Webb as Musgrave
- Cecil Morton York as Johnstone
- Charles Barratt as Alick Johnstone
- Bertie Wright as Brookie
- Lionel Braham as Jamie the Ox
- Dorothy Harris as Cecilia Johnstone
- J. Nelson Ramsay as Graeme

== Bibliography ==
- Low, Rachael. History of the British Film, 1918–1929. George Allen & Unwin, 1971.
