= Hutin Britton =

English actress (1876–1965)

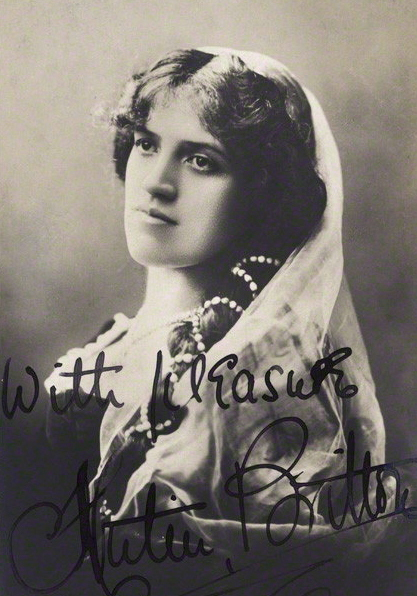
Britton c. 1905

Britton as Ophelia in Hamlet

Nelly Hutin Britton (24 April 1876 — 3 September 1965), usually credited as Hutin Britton was an English actress. She was best known for her performances in Shakespeare roles early in the 20th century. She also appeared in leading roles in two silent British films.

== Biography ==
Nelly, the daughter of Thomas Britton, was born in Bucklebury in Berkshire, England in 1876. Her first appearance on stage was with Frank Benson's company in 1901, in Henry V. Among the Shakespeare parts she played were Hero in Much Ado About Nothing (1903), Ophelia in Hamlet (1909), Lady Elizabeth in Richard III (1909) and Lady Macbeth at Stratford (1911).

In 1903 she married actor Matheson Lang in London and thereafter they often appeared together on stage and later on film. In 1906 she played Arganthael in Joseph Comyns Carr's play Tristram and Iseult at the Adelphi Theatre, with Lang as Tristram. Britton and Lang subsequently formed their own company, which toured India, South Africa and Australia from 1910 to 1913 performing Shakespeare. Her roles included Katherine in The Taming of the Shrew, Portia in The Merchant of Venice, Juliet in Romeo and Juliet, as well as reprising the roles of Ophelia and Lady Macbeth.

In 1914, she and Lang successfully produced The Taming of the Shrew, The Merchant of Venice, and Hamlet at the Old Vic Theatre. She also appeared with him in Mr Wu, which became his signature role. In 1916 they appeared together in a silent film of The Merchant of Venice in which she once again played Portia. She also joined her husband in the film The Wandering Jew (1923) playing the part of Judith. After a four-year illness and a temporary retirement, she returned to the Old Vic stage in 1923 for the Shakespeare Birthday Festival and the following year as Volumnia in Coriolanus, and continued to act until 1936.

In 1940 the Langs were staying with their old friend Dornford Yates and his wife at their house near Pau in France when France surrendered and had to escape from the advancing Germans through Spain to Portugal.

In later life she sat on the governing board of the Old Vic Theatre.

Britton died in 1965 aged 89 - although the registration of her death (Nellie H Lang) in Uckfield, Sussex has her aged 90.

== Selection of Britton's performances ==
- Oliver Twist as Nancy, Shakespeare Theatre, Liverpool, 1905.
- Tristram and Iseult as Arganthael (Adelphi Theatre, 1906)
- Pete as Kate Cregeen (1908)

== Filmography ==
- The Merchant of Venice (1916)
- The Wandering Jew (1923)

== Sources ==
- Mr Matheson Lang and Miss Hutin Britton - Rudolph De Cordova, Westminster Abbey Press, 1909.
- Mr Wu Looks Back (1940) - Lang's Memoirs
