= The Sporting Instinct =

1922 film

- Directed by: Arthur Rooke
- Written by: Arthur Rooke; Kinchen Wood
- Production company: I.B. Davidson
- Distributed by: Granger Films
- Release date: September 1922
- Country: United Kingdom
- Languages: Silent; English intertitles

The Sporting Instinct is a 1922 British silent drama film directed by Arthur Rooke and starring Lilian Douglas, Joseph R. Tozer and Mickey Brantford.

== Cast ==
- Lilian Douglas as June Crisp
- Joseph R. Tozer as Jerry West
- Mickey Brantford as Tony
- Tom Coventry as The Burglar
- Betty Chapman as His Wife
- Somers Bellamy as The Captain
- Hetty Chapman
- Vivian Gosnell
- Howard Symons
- Billy Vernon

== Bibliography ==
- Low, Rachael. History of the British Film, 1918-1929. George Allen & Unwin, 1971.
