= No Smoking (1955 film) =

British comedy by Henry Cass

- Directed by: Henry Cass
- Screenplay by: Kenneth Hayles; Phil Park
- Based on: No Smoking by George Moresby-White and Rex Rienits
- Produced by: Robert S. Baker; Monty Berman
- Starring: Reg Dixon; Peter Martyn; Belinda Lee; Lionel Jeffries
- Cinematography: Monty Berman
- Edited by: Jack Slade
- Music by: Ivor Slaney
- Production company: Tempean Films
- Distributed by: Eros Films
- Release date: November 1955
- Running time: 66 minutes
- Country: United Kingdom
- Language: English

No Smoking is a 1955 British second feature ('B') comedy film directed by Henry Cass and starring Reg Dixon, Peter Martyn, Belinda Lee and Lionel Jeffries. The screenplay was by Kenneth Hayles and Phil Park, based on the 1952 TV play of same title by George Moresby-White and Rex Rienits. It was produced by Tempean Films. Shortly after the production Lee was signed up for a contract with the Rank Organisation.

== Plot ==
Reg Bates is a scientist who invents a pill that can cure smokers of their nicotine addiction. This is revealed by a visiting American, Hal Hurst. Bates faces strong opposition from both the tobacco industry and the government.

== Cast ==
- Reg Dixon as Reg Bates
- Peter Martyn as Hal Hurst
- Belinda Lee as Miss Tonkins
- Ruth Trouncer as Joyce
- Alexander Gauge as Wellington-Simpson
- Lionel Jeffries as George Pogson
- Myrtle Rowe as Milly
- Arthur Young as Joe Dawson
- Hal Osmond as yokel
- Tom Gill as Foreign Office official
- Ronnie Stevens as BBC man
- Alan Robinson as Thackery
- Bill Lowe as civil servant
- Doris Hare as customer
- Ian Fleming as Doctor Moxom
- Patrick Jordan as reporter
- Alan Gifford as American Ambassador
- Roger Maxwell as Major
- Scott Harrold as man in surgery
- Jan Holden as receptionist
- Phil Park as vicar
- James Raglan as chancellor

== Production ==
The TV play on which the film was based was described by the Daily Mail as "plenty of good family fun."

The film was shot at Southall Studios with sets designed by the art director Wilfred Arnold.

It was one of only a few movies starring Reg Dixon. It was one of several comedies featuring Belinda Lee.

== Reception ==
The Monthly Film Bulletin wrote: "Unfortunately the action does not fizz; the bubbles never quite come to the surface; and there is the inevitable song and dance dream sequence, which might be dispensed with. Reg Dixon, as the inventor, and Lionel Jeffries, as the village tobacconist, play quite amiably"

Kine Weekly wrote: "The picture, a queer mixture of the amateurish and the slick, has its moments, but they barely outweigh its flat spots. Reg Dixon works tirelessly and sings occasionally, yet finds the going rough as Reg, but Lionel Jeffries draws amusing character as Pogson, Myrtle Rowe effectively plays hard to get as Milly, and Belinda Lee introduces a touch of sex as a sweater girl sccretary. The rest are so-so. The second half is infinitely brighter than the first and luckily enables it to end on a lively note. In all, a harmless, typically English romp."

Picture Show wrote: "Reg Dixon makes one of his rare film appearances in this bright comedy as a chemist who invents an anti-smoking pill. Amusing performances also come from Lionel Jeffries, Myrtle Rowe and Belinda Lee. There are pleasant tunes."

The Radio Times Guide to Films gave the film 2/5 stars, writing: "Notable only for its anti-smoking theme in a period where no one bothered about puffing away on a cigarette, this gentle comedy ends up a wasted opportunity, though the cast give their all."

In British Sound Films: The Studio Years 1928–1959 David Quinlan rated the film as "mediocre", writing: "Potty comedy doesn't catch fire."
