= Joan Lockton =

British actress

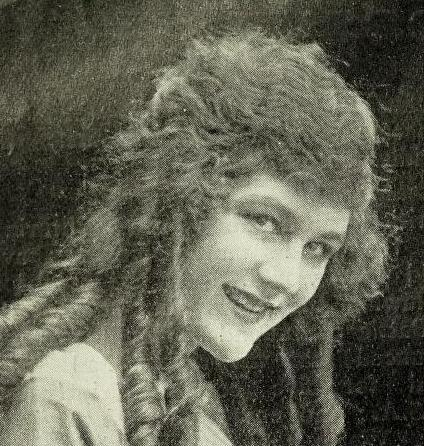
Joan Lockton, from a 1921 publication.

Joan Rosamunde Lockton (4 September 1901 – 19 March 1973) was a British actress.

In 1925 in Bloomsbury, she married Harry Levy, who managed traveling theatre revues.

== Selected filmography ==
- The Disappearance of the Judge (1919)
- Pillars of Society (1920)
- Miss Charity (1921)
- White Slippers (1924)
- The Sins Ye Do (1924)
- Confessions (1925)
- A Woman Redeemed (1927)
- The King's Highway (1927)
