= A Girl of London =

1925 film

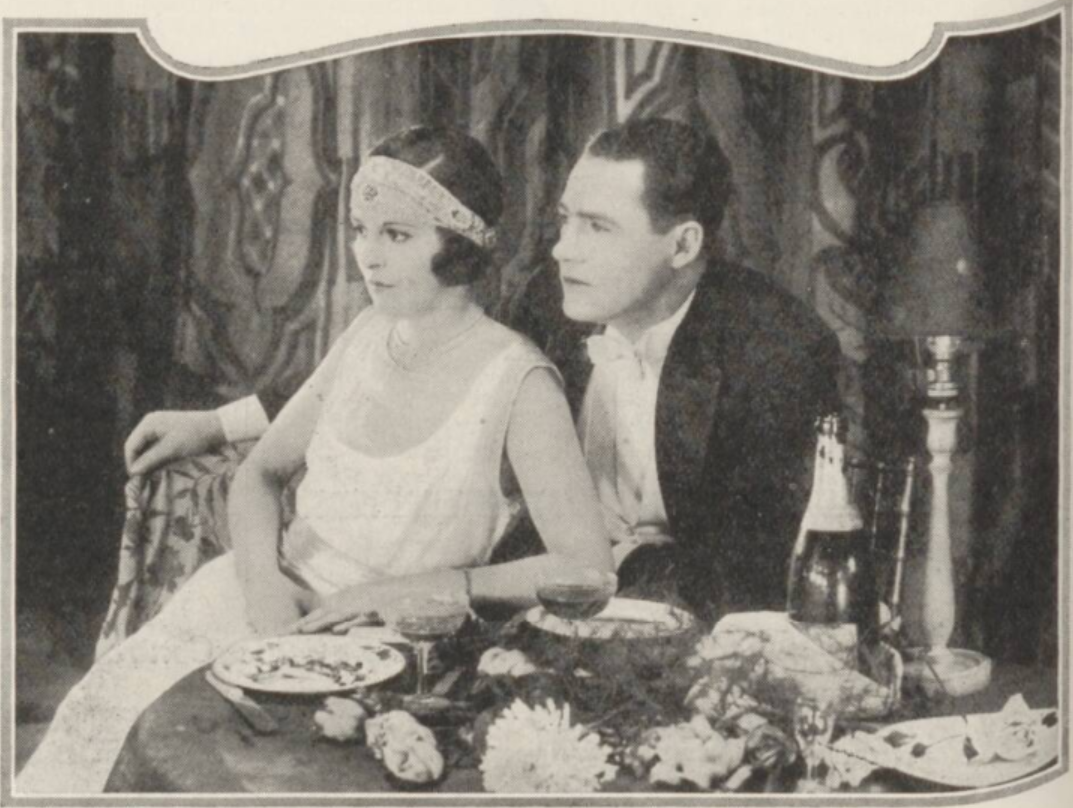
- Nora Swinburne and Ian Hunter
- Directed by: Henry Edwards
- Based on: Novel by Douglas Walshe
- Starring: Genevieve Townsend; Ian Hunter; Harvey Braban; G. H. Mulcaster
- Production company: Stoll Pictures
- Distributed by: Stoll Pictures
- Release date: October 1925
- Country: United Kingdom
- Languages: Silent; English intertitles

A Girl of London is a 1925 British silent drama film directed by Henry Edwards and starring Genevieve Townsend, Ian Hunter and Nora Swinburne. Its plot concerns the son of a member of parliament, who is disowned by his father when he marries a girl who works in a factory. Meanwhile, he tries to rescue his new wife from her stepfather who operates a drugs den. It was based on a novel by Douglas Walshe.

== Cast ==
- Genevieve Townsend as Lil
- Ian Hunter as Peter Horniman
- Harvey Braban as George Durran
- G. H. Mulcaster as Wilson
- Nora Swinburne as Vee-Vee
- Edward Irwin as Lionel Horniman
- Bernard Dudley as Lawton
- Nell Emerald as Mother

== Bibliography ==
- Low, Rachael. The History of British Film, Volume 4 1918–1929. Routledge, 1997.
