= Sam's Boy =

1922 film

- Directed by: Manning Haynes
- Produced by: George Redman
- Starring: Johnny Butt; Tom Coventry; Bobbie Rudd
- Production company: Artistic Pictures
- Distributed by: Artistic Pictures
- Release date: February 1922
- Country: United Kingdom
- Languages: Silent; English intertitles

Sam's Boy is a 1922 British silent comedy film directed by Manning Haynes and starring Johnny Butt, Tom Coventry and Bobbie Rudd.

== Cast ==
- Johnny Butt as Captain Hart
- Tom Coventry as Sam Brown
- Bobbie Rudd as Billy Jones
- Charles Ashton Harry Green
- Toby Cooper as Charlie Legge
- Mary Braithwaite as Mrs. Hunt
- Kate Gurney as Mrs. Brown
- Harry Newman as Mate

== Bibliography ==
- Goble, Alan. The Complete Index to Literary Sources in Film. Walter de Gruyter, 1999.
