= A Woman Redeemed =

1927 film

- Directed by: Sinclair Hill
- Written by: F. Britten Austin (short story); Mary Murillo
- Starring: Joan Lockton; Brian Aherne; Stella Arbenina; James Carew
- Cinematography: D.P. Cooper; Desmond Dickinson
- Production company: Stoll Pictures
- Distributed by: New Era
- Release date: 31 August 1927
- Country: United Kingdom
- Language: English

A Woman Redeemed is a 1927 British crime film directed by Sinclair Hill and starring Joan Lockton, Brian Aherne and James Carew. The screenplay concerns a secret society that tries to steal sensitive information. The film was based on the short story "The Fining Pot is for Silver", written by F. Britten Austin that was originally published on the June 1924 issue of The Strand Magazine.

== Premise ==
A secret society uses a young woman to try to steal some sensitive information.

== Cast ==
- Joan Lockton as Felice Annaway
- Brian Aherne as Geoffrey Maynefleet
- Stella Arbenina as Marta
- James Carew as Count Kalvestro
- Gordon Hopkirk as Angelo
- Frank Denton as Bug
- Robert English as Colonel Mather

== Bibliography ==
- Low, Rachael. History of the British Film, 1918-1929. George Allen & Unwin, 1971.
