= Daisy Campbell (silent film actress) =

British actress

Daisy Campbell was a British film actress of the silent era. At the beginning of her career she was popular on the London stage. She was noted for playing aristocratic white-haired ladies and duchesses, and appeared in more than 20 British silent films. She made her film debut portraying Mrs. Waltham in Denison Clift's Demos with Milton Rosmer in 1921. She is perhaps best remembered as Countess of Strangeways in Arthur Maude's 1927 film Poppies of Flanders. Her final appearance was as Mrs. McPhillip in The Informer (1929).

== Selected filmography ==
- Demos (1921)
- The Nonentity (1921)
- A Woman of No Importance (1921)
- Expiation (1922)
- The Indian Love Lyrics (1923)
- The White Shadow (1923)
- Out to Win (1923)
- Hurricane Hutch in Many Adventures (1924)
- The Wonderful Wooing (1925)
- The Woman Who Did (1925)
- Irish Destiny (1926)
- London (1926)
- Poppies of Flanders (1927)
- Second to None (1927)
- A Daughter in Revolt (1928)
- High Seas (1929)
- The Informer (1929)
- After the Verdict (1929)
