= The River House Mystery =

1935 film by Fraser Foulsham

- Ena Moon and George Mulcaster in the film.
- Directed by: Fraser Foulsham
- Screenplay by: F.G. Robertson
- Produced by: A. B. Imeson
- Starring: George Mulcaster; Ena Moon; Bernard Lee
- Production company: Imeson-Foulsham Films
- Release date: 27 January 1936
- Running time: 56 minutes
- Country: United Kingdom
- Language: English

The River House Mystery is a 1935 British film directed by Fraser Foulsham and starring George Mulcaster, Ena Moon and A. B. Imeson. It was written by F.G. Robertson and produced as a quota quickie.

== Preservation status ==
The British Film Institute National Archive holds no stills or ephemera, and no film or video materials.

== Plot ==
Amateur criminologist Sir John Harpenden, speaking at a dinner of the London Criminologists' Club, recounts how his fellow-directors contrived to involve him in a criminal adventure during which he believed he has killed a man. The situation turned out to be a hoax manufactured by his fellow directors, in league with his favourite detective fiction author, to prevent him signing a contract of which they disapproved. Sir John reveals that he had benefitted from the affair by gaining a wife.

== Cast ==
- George Mulcaster as Sir John Harpenden
- Ena Moon as Anna
- Bernard Lee as Wade Belloc
- A. B. Imeson as Drang
- Roddy Hughes as Higgins
- Boris Ranevsky as Kilirov
- Clifford Evans as Ivan
- Davy Hayward

== Reception ==
The Monthly Film Bulletin wrote: "The opening is almost brilliant and the first third of the film is intriguing and exciting. The use of the character's voice commentating on his own silent action, i.e., in telling what happened, is both interesting and successful. Then everything goes to pieces: direction, dialogue and acting become naive and melodramatic. It is impossible to take some of the scenes seriously. After such a good beginning it is a pity that this film can only be described as average entertainment."

Kine Weekly wrote: "It is all very naive, and since one is wholly unconvinced by the mysterious proceedings themselves it hardly comes as a surprise that the whole thing was a hoax – one had hoped it was. ... Generally the acting is rather stilted, and the artistes concerned are unable to make much of the material at their command."

The Daily Film Renter wrote: "The production can be dismissed in a few lines, because it has been made without the least semblance of imagination. There is quite an amusing idea behind it, but the acting is so exaggerated and direction and other qualities so uninspired that it can never hope to sustain interest for very long. Unsophisticated audiences may find amusement in the development and the trick the plot plays on them in the end, but otherwise there is little to it."
