= The Merchant of Venice (1916 film) =

1916 film by Walter West

- Directed by: Walter West
- Written by: William Shakespeare (play)
- Produced by: Walter West
- Starring: Matheson Lang; Hutin Britton; Terence O'Brien
- Production company: Broadwest
- Release date: 1916
- Running time: 86 minutes
- Country: United Kingdom
- Language: English

The Merchant of Venice is a 1916 British silent drama film directed by Walter West and starring Matheson Lang, Hutin Britton, Ernest Caselli. It is an adaptation of William Shakespeare's play The Merchant of Venice.

== Production ==
The film was made by Broadwest. The company hired the complete stage cast of the play and filmed at Walthamstow Studios using largely natural light. The film marked the screen debut of Matheson Lang who went on to become one of the leading British actors of the 1920s. It was not a success.

== Cast ==
- Matheson Lang as Shylock
- Hutin Britton as Portia
- Ernest Caselli as Lorenzo
- Kathleen Hazel Jones as Jessica
- George Morgan as Lancelot
- Terence O'Brien as Tubal
- George Skillan as Antonio
- Joseph Tozer as Bassanio
- Marguerite Westlake as Nerissa
