= The Hypocrites (1923 film) =

1923 film

- Directed by: Charles Giblyn
- Written by: Henry Arthur Jones (play); Eliot Stannard
- Release date: February 1923
- Countries: United Kingdom; Netherlands
- Language: Silent

The Hypocrites (Dutch: Farizeëers) is a 1923 British-Dutch silent drama film directed by Charles Giblyn, based on The Hypocrites, a 1906 play by Henry Arthur Jones. The plot concerns the hypocrisy of a squire who tries to make his son deny he fathered a village girl's child, and instead marry an heiress. Jones' play which had already been filmed as The Morals of Weybury (1916) directed by George Loane Tucker with Elisabeth Risdon. The writing credit for this movie goes to Henry Arthur Jones (play) and Eliot Stannard (writer).

== Cast ==
- Wyndham Standing - Rev, Edgar Linnell
- Mary Odette - Rachel Neve
- Lilian Douglas - Helen Plugenet
- Harold French - Lennard Wilmore
- Sidney Paxton - Henry Wilmore
- Roy Travers - Sir John Plugenet
- Bertie White - Aubrey Viveash
- William Hunter - Rev, Everard Daubeney
- Gertrude Sterroll - Mrs. Wilmore
- Vera Hargreave - Mrs. Linnell
- Esther de Boer-van Rijk
- Juliette Roos - (as Juliëtte Roos)
- Carl Tobi
- Evan Shewchuk - Sir Hypocrite McLiar
