= Britannia of Billingsgate =

1933 British film by Sinclair Hill

- Directed by: Sinclair Hill
- Written by: George Moresby-White; Ralph Stock
- Based on: Britannia of Billingsgate by Sewell Stokes and Christine Jope-Slade
- Produced by: Michael Balcon
- Starring: Violet Loraine; Gordon Harker; Kay Hammond; John Mills
- Cinematography: Mutz Greenbaum
- Edited by: Frederick Y. Smith
- Music by: Bretton Byrd; Jack Beaver
- Production company: Gaumount British Pictures
- Distributed by: Gaumont British Distributors
- Release date: May 1933
- Running time: 80 minutes
- Country: United Kingdom
- Language: English

Britannia of Billingsgate is a 1933 British musical comedy film directed by Sinclair Hill and starring Violet Loraine, Gordon Harker, Kay Hammond and John Mills. It was written by George Moresby-White and Ralph Stock based on the 1931 play Britannia of Billingsgate by Christine Jope-Slade and Sewell Stokes.

It was shot at the Lime Grove Studios in London. The film's sets were designed by the art director Alfred Junge.

== Plot ==
A family who work in the fish trade at Billingsgate Market encounter a film crew who are shooting there.

== Cast ==
- Violet Loraine as Bessie Bolton
- Gordon Harker as Bert Bolton
- Kay Hammond as Pearl Bolton
- John Mills as Fred Bolton
- Drusilla Wills as Mrs Wrigley
- Walter Sondes as Harold Hogarth
- Glennis Lorimer as Maud
- Anthony Holles as Guidobaldi
- Joyce Kirby as Joan
- Gibb McLaughlin as Westerbrook
- Grethe Hansen as Gwen
- Wally Patch as Harry
- Ernest Sefton as publicity man

== Speedway scenes ==
The motorcycle speedway scenes from the film were shot at Lea Bridge Stadium, featuring some of the leading riders in Britain at the time: Colin Watson, Arthur Warwick, Gus Kuhn, Tom Farndon, Claude Rye and Ron Johnson.

== Reception ==
Film Weekly wrote: "The producers of Britannia of Billingsgate have made a thoroughly British comedy which also has the advantage of being a good film. The progrens from an East End fish-and-chip shop to a West End film studio of Mrs. Britannia Bolton, the Pride of Billingsgate, is paved with laughter."

Kine Weekly wrote: "Sound comedy on popular lines with marked Cockney flavour, broad rather than subtle in characterisation. Its strong point consists of settings in Billingsgate market, a real film studio, and a dirt-track sequence. Smooth direction helps an unconvincing scenario, and the stars come over well, especially Violet Loraine, whose screen debut is helped by several songs in her very individual style."
