= The Scarlet Letter (1922 film) =

1922 film

The Scarlet Letter is a 1922 British silent drama film directed by Challis Sanderson and starring Sybil Thorndike, Tony Fraser and Dick Webb. It is an adaptation of the 1850 novel The Scarlet Letter by Nathaniel Hawthorne.

== Plot ==
An affair between a young woman, whose husband is presumed dead, and a pastor has disastrous consequences for all three.

== Cast ==
- Sybil Thorndike as Hester Prynne
- Tony Fraser as Pastor Dimmesdale
- Dick Webb as Roger Chillingworth
