= The King's Highway =

1927 film

- Directed by: Sinclair Hill
- Starring: Matheson Lang; Joan Lockton; James Carew; Gerald Ames
- Cinematography: D.P. Cooper; Desmond Dickinson
- Production company: Stoll Pictures
- Distributed by: Stoll Pictures
- Release date: October 1927
- Country: United Kingdom
- Language: English

The King's Highway is a 1927 British romantic adventure film directed by Sinclair Hill and starring James Carew, Gerald Ames, Matheson Lang and Joan Lockton. The film follows the romance and escapades of an eighteenth-century English highwaymen.

== Cast ==
- Matheson Lang as Paul Clifford
- Joan Lockton as Lucy Brandon
- James Carew as James Brandon
- Gerald Ames as Lord Maulveren
- Mark Lupino as Old Baggs
- Henry Latimer as Gentleman George
- Sydney Seaward as Augustus
- Frank Goldsmith as Squire John Brandon
- Clifford Heatherley as Beau Nash
- Nell Emerald as Lizzie Lob
- Aubrey Fitzgerald as Nathaniel
- George Butler as Long Ned
- Frederick Ranalow as MacHeath
- Wally Patch as Police Chief

== Bibliography ==
- Low, Rachael. History of the British Film, 1918-1929. George Allen & Unwin, 1971.
