= Convicted (1931 film) =

1931 film

- Directed by: Christy Cabanne
- Written by: Barry Barringer; Arthur Hoerl; Jo Van Ronkel
- Produced by: Alfred T. Mannon
- Cinematography: Sidney Hickox
- Edited by: Don Lindberg; Tom Persons
- Release date: 1931
- Running time: 63 minutes
- Country: US
- Language: English

Convicted is a 1931 American pre-Code film directed by Christy Cabanne and starring Aileen Pringle and Jameson Thomas.

== Plot ==
Tony Blair, a producer of Broadway plays, is murdered on a California-bound passenger liner, and a series of events leads to an assumption that Claire Norvelle has committed the killing. Despite the fact that Blair was an obnoxious character, murder is murder and Barbara is accused of the crime. Complications arise when another murder occurs. The startling solution clears Barbara and provides a surprising explanation of the two murders.

== Production ==
"The production company credit on-screen reads: "Produced by Supreme Features, Inc, LTD. Alfred T. Mannon, Pres." According to the main title, production facilities were located at Tec-Art Studio, Inc., which was located on Melrose Avenue in Hollywood. Although much of the film was shot on location aboard a passenger ship. Known as Tec-Art Studio in the 1920 and early 1930s, through its history the lot has been known variously as Clune Studio, Fiction Studios, Tec-Art, California Studio, Producers Studio, and Raleigh Studios."

== Cast ==
- Aileen Pringle as Claire Norville
- Jameson Thomas as Bruce Allan
- Dorothy Christy as Constance Forbes
- Richard Tucker as Tony Blair
- Harry Myers as Sturgeon
- Niles Welch as Roy Fenton
- Jack Mower as Henderson
- Wilfred Lucas as Captain Hammond
- Wild Bill Elliott (credited as Gordon Elliott) as Passenger

== Reception ==
The Motion Picture Guide, first published in 1985, describes Convicted as a "nicely developed murder mystery". However, in his 2010 biography and guide Wild Bill Elliot: A Complete Filmography, author Gene Blottner characterizes the film as "an adequate but undistinguished low-budget murder mystery".
