= Walter Sully =

Walter Sully (1895–1970) was an Australian cinematographer who worked for Cinesound Productions, Frank Hurley and Movietone. He was one of the leading newsreel cameramen of the 1930s.

== Select credits ==
- A Romance of Burke and Wills Expedition of 1860 (1918)
- Jewelled Nights (1925)
- Jungle Woman (1926)
- The Hound of the Deep (1926)
- The Kingdom of Twilight (1928)
- The Birth of White Australia (1928)
- Thar She Blows! (1931)
- Showgirl's Luck (1931)
- On Our Selection (1932)
