= Escapade (1932 film) =

1932 film

- Directed by: Richard Thorpe
- Written by: Edward T. Lowe Jr.
- Produced by: George R. Batcheller; Maury M. Cohen
- Starring: Jameson Thomas; Sally Blane; Anthony Bushell
- Cinematography: M.A. Anderson
- Production company: Invincible Pictures
- Distributed by: Chesterfield Pictures
- Release date: April 1, 1932
- Running time: 67 minutes
- Country: United States
- Language: English

Escapade is a 1932 American pre-Code crime film directed by Richard Thorpe and starring Jameson Thomas, Sally Blane and Anthony Bushell. It is also known by the alternative title of Dangerous Ground.

== Cast ==
- Jameson Thomas as John Whitney
- Sally Blane as Kay Whitney
- Anthony Bushell as Philip Whitney
- Thomas E. Jackson as Bennie
- Walter Long as Gympy McLane
- Carmelita Geraghty as Mildred Warren
- Phillips Smalley as Wally Hines
- David Mir as Ambrose - the Poet
- Edward Cooper as Baxter - the Butler

== Bibliography ==
- Pitts, Michael R. Poverty Row Studios, 1929-1940. McFarland & Company, 2005.
