= Midnight Menace (1937 film) =

1937 film

- Directed by: Sinclair Hill
- Written by: Alexander Mackendrick; Roger MacDougall; George Moresby-White; D.B. Wyndham-Lewis
- Produced by: Harcourt Templeman
- Starring: Charles Farrell; Margaret Vyner; Fritz Kortner
- Cinematography: Cyril Bristow
- Edited by: John E. Morris
- Music by: John Reynders
- Production company: Grosvenor Films
- Distributed by: Associated British Film Distributors
- Release date: 1 July 1937
- Running time: 79 minutes
- Country: United Kingdom
- Language: English

Midnight Menace (also known as Midnight Special; U.S. title: Bombs Over London) is a 1937 British thriller film directed by Sinclair Hill and starring Charles Farrell, Margaret Vyner, Fritz Kortner and Danny Green. It was written by G.H. Moresby-White from a story by Roger MacDougall and Alexander Mackendrick and concerns an international arms manufacturing firm's plans to start a war in Europe by bombing London.

== Cast ==
- Charles Farrell as Brian Gaunt
- Margaret Vyner as Mary Stevens
- Fritz Kortner as Peters
- Danny Green as Socks
- Wallace Evennett as Smith
- Monti DeLyle as Pierre
- Dino Galvani as Tony
- Arthur Finn as Mac, newspaper editor
- Laurence Hanray as Sir George, lead conspirator
- Arthur Gomez as Baron von Kleisch, delegate
- Raymond Lovell as Harris
- Evan John as Doctor Marsh
- Reynes Barton as conference president
- Terence O'Brien as secret agent Fearns
- Dennis Val Norton as Vronsky, Peters' aide
- Billy Bray as Banks
- Sydney King as Graham Stevens
- Andreas Malandrinos as Zadek
- Victor Tandy as Groves

== Production ==
The film was made at Pinewood Studios with sets designed by Wilfred Arnold.

== Reception ==
The Monthly Film Bulletin wrote: "This exciting story is more colourful than credible. It has abundance of action and incident, and the climax is thrilling and well-staged. The Disarmament Conference makes a novel and effective background, and its meetings are treated with a deftly satirical touch. The elaborately equipped laboratory with its bewildering gadgets for radio aerial control is equally effective if less original. The acting is of the kind required by the story. Fritz Kortner is a sinister and clever schemer; Charles Farrell is a pleasant and intelligent hero and Margaret Vyner makes the most of a small part."

Kine Weekly wrote: "Fritz Kortner's essay in suave villainy is always interesting and compelling. Charles Farrell has not a great deal to do but look handsome and Margaret Viner, a comparative newcomer, though also lacking in opportunity, does enough to suggest that she should be an asset to the British heroine department. The narration is at times a trifle confusing and the actions of the hero inconsistent, but the story eventually builds up soundly enough to a thrilling climax."

Variety wrote: "A man's picture. May not attract the femmes, but, if once inside, likely they'll be entertained. ... Charles Farrell gives a lukewarm portrayal as a newspaperman; Margaret Vyner is rather colorless in a thankless, kissless romance, but for the rest of the cast there is nothing but praise. Picture belongs to Fritz Kortner in a role that Peter Lorre or Conrad Veidt might have essayed, but could not have improved upon. It is the quiet, effective handling of the plot which is its chief merit, rather than the story itself."
