= George Moresby-White =

British playwright and screenwriter

- Other name: G.H. Moresby-White
- Occupation: Screenwriter
- Years active: 1933 - 1952 (film)

George Moresby-White was a British playwright and screenwriter. He is also known as G.H. Moresby-White. One of his plays was the basis for the 1955 comedy film No Smoking.

== Selected filmography ==
- Britannia of Billingsgate (1933)
- Friday the Thirteenth (1933)
- Midnight Menace (1937)
- Take a Chance (1937)
- The Heirloom Mystery (1937)

== Bibliography ==
- Halliwell, Leslie. Halliwell's Film Guide. HarperPerennial, 1996.
