= The Television Follies =

1933 British film by Geoffrey Benstead

- Opening titles
- Directed by: Geoffrey Benstead
- Written by: Geoffrey Benstead
- Produced by: John E. Blakeley
- Starring: George Carney
- Cinematography: D.P. Cooper; Hal Young
- Production company: English Films
- Release date: 1933
- Running time: 39 minutes
- Country: United Kingdom
- Language: English

The Television Follies is a 1933 British short black-and-white musical comedy film directed and written by Geoffrey Benstead, and starring George Carney and a collection of music-hall acts. It was produced by John E. Blakeley. It is subtitled "A Film Cocktail in Five Shakes".

The film is unrelated to the 1937 BBC television variety series Television Follies.

== Preservation status ==
The British Film Institute National Archive holds no stills, ephemera or film materials. In 2026 the film was broadcast by the British TV channel Talking Pictures TV, from a print held by The Cinema Museum, London.

== Synopsis ==
Purporting to be broadcast entertainment viewed on a Baird televisor television in the working-class Lancashire home of the Bloss family, the film presents a selection of music-hall acts, including comedy, singing, dancing and acrobatics. The turns are linked by comedic bickering among the family and the humorous comments of the father.

== Cast ==
- George Carney as Mr Bloss, the father
- Jock McKay as Jock
- Henderson and Lennox as Our Detectives
- Fred Curran as Mr Klunk
- Joan Emney as the wife
- Wynne Gibson as Cutie (as Wynn Gibson)
- Billie Kay as Wun Lung
- Carlton as The Master
- Syd Monroe as The Lancashire Lad
- The Sherman-Fisher Girls as dancers
- Rodney-Hudson Girls as The Lassies
- Flo Stuart as Toto
- Nigel Hope as The Cocktail
- Jade Hales as the girl
- Jack Hodges as Our Announcer
- Leslie Day as boy soprano

== Reception ==
Kine Weekly wrote: "Cabaret turns performed by popular artistes as seen through the medium of a working-class family's televisor. Material is chiefly made up of songs and song-and-dance numbers. Although nothing outstanding, quite a serviceable programme of variety is provided, which should appeal to popular tastes. Innocuous to children, to whom some sequences will undoubtedly appeal. ... Geoffrey Benstead contrasts lowbrow humour with stage atmosphere by various flashbacks to the North-country owners of the televisor, whose wisecracks link up the various turns."

The Daily Film Renter wrote: "Uneven direction mars fluency of presentation, though individual artistes are efficient. ... There is, of course, no story in this musical melange, nor has any attempt been made to introduce one other than the tinkering of a man with a television set and his subsequent reception of a broadcast program. ... George Carney is responsible for a modicum of droll comedy. Chief criticism should be directed towards the tempo, which lacks snap."
