= Terence O'Brien (actor) =

British actor (1887–1970)

- as Cominius in Coriolanus: Old Vic, 1938
- Born: 25 October 1887; Dublin, Ireland
- Died: 13 October 1970 (aged 82); Welwyn, Hertfordshire, England
- Occupation: Actor

Terence O'Brien (1887–1970) was an Irish-born British stage actor, active at Stratford, The Old Vic and in the West End. He also appeared in several films.

== Selected filmography ==
- The Merchant of Venice (1916)
- The House Opposite (1917)
- Q Ships (1928)
- Midnight Menace (1937)
- The World Owes Me a Living (1945)
