= The House Opposite (1917 film) =

1917 film by Walter West and Frank Wilson

The House Opposite is a 1917 British silent drama film directed by Walter West and Frank Wilson and starring Matheson Lang, Violet Hopson and Ivy Close. It was based on the 1909 play of the same name by Perceval Landon. A crime film, it revolves around the jealous wife of law enforcement officer who witnesses a murder while she is visiting her lover.

== Cast ==
- Matheson Lang as Henry Rivers MP
- Violet Hopson as Mrs. Anstruther
- Ivy Close as Mrs. Rivers
- Gregory Scott as Richard Cardyne
- Dora De Winton
- J. Hastings Batson
- Terence O'Brien
- Dora Barton
