= The Sins Ye Do =

1924 film

- Directed by: Fred LeRoy Granville
- Written by: Emmeline Morrison (novel); Mary Murillo
- Starring: Joan Lockton; Henry Victor; Eileen Dennes
- Production company: Stoll Pictures
- Distributed by: Stoll Pictures
- Release date: October 1924
- Country: United Kingdom
- Languages: Silent; English intertitles

The Sins Ye Do is a 1924 British silent romance film directed by Fred LeRoy Granville and starring Joan Lockton, Henry Victor and Eileen Dennes. It was made at Cricklewood Studios by Stoll Pictures.

== Plot ==
"A British love drama about a man whose life is almost wrecked by the indiscretions of a friend".

== Cast ==
- Joan Lockton as Lady Athol / Nadine
- Henry Victor as Ronald Hillier
- Eileen Dennes as Lady Eslin
- May Hanbury as Muriel Allendale
- Jameson Thomas as Captain Barrington
- Jerrold Robertshaw as Sir Philip Athol
- Eric Bransby Williams as Neville Fane
- Leslie Attwood as Nadine
- Edward O'Neill as Bishop Hillier
- Frank Perfitt as Dr. Rutherford
- Annie Esmond as Governess
