= Jameson Thomas =

English actor (1888–1939)

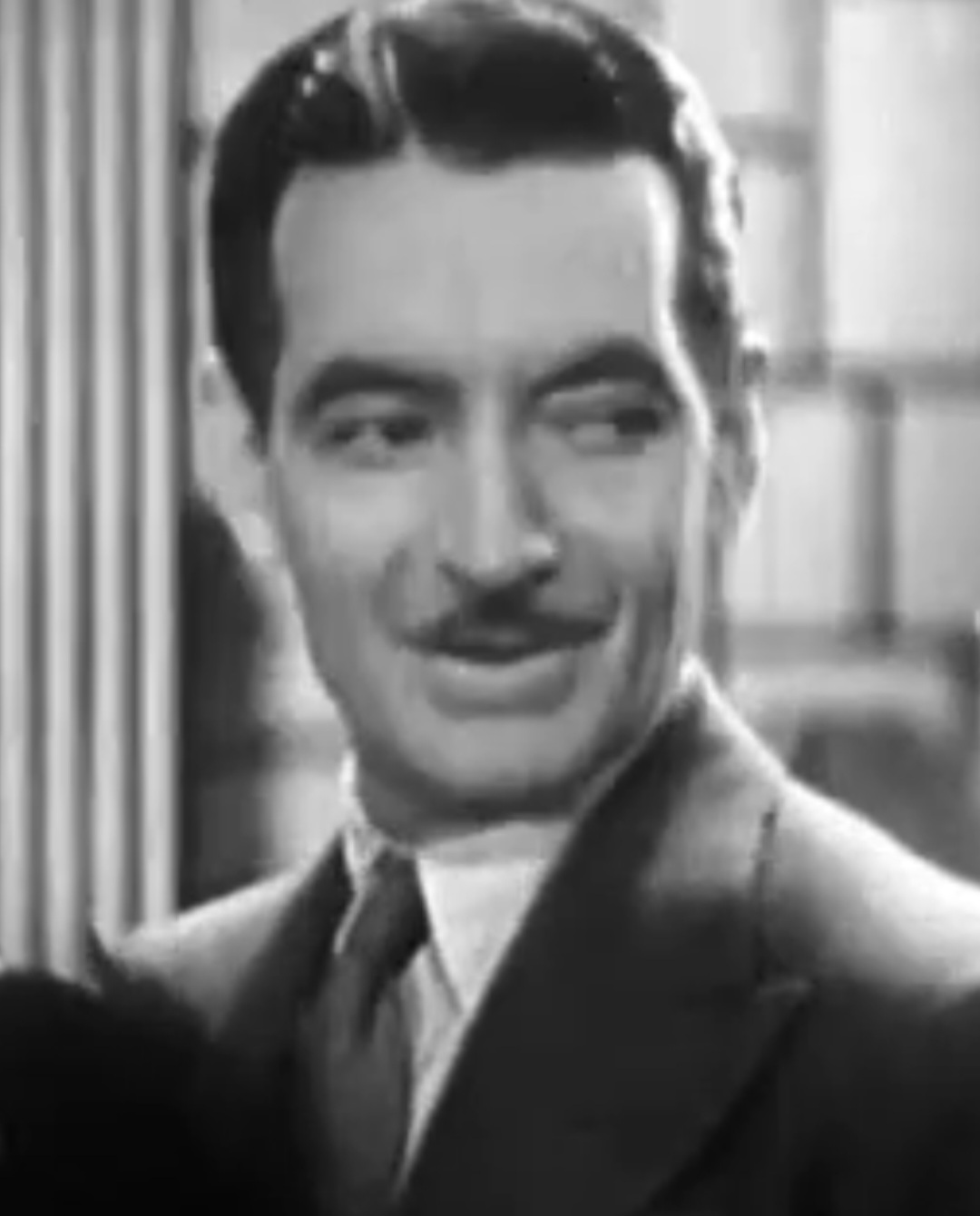
- Thomas in Extravagance (1930)
- Born: Thomas Roland Jameson; 24 March 1888; St George Hanover Square, London, England
- Died: 10 January 1939 (aged 50); Sierra Madre, California, U.S.
- Resting place: Hollywood Forever Cemetery
- Other name: Jamison Thomas
- Occupation: Actor
- Years active: 1923–1939
- Spouse(s): Dorothy Dix (m. 1916; div. 19??)

Jameson Thomas (born Thomas Roland Jameson; 24 March 1888 – 10 January 1939) was an English film actor. He appeared in more than 80 films between 1923 and 1939.

== Biography ==
He was born in St George Hanover Square, London. On the stage from his early teens, Jameson first appeared as a "half-breed" boy in The Squaw Man. He made his screen debut in 1923 in the film Chu Chin Chow. In 1929, he starred in Piccadilly as Valentine Wilmot opposite Anna May Wong. Piccadilly was a smash hit in England, where reviewers called it "by far the best production yet made at Elstree" and "one of the finest films that has ever come from a British studio." The film, however, only received a tepid response in the U.S. where it had a limited run. Today, Piccadilly is recognised as an accomplished melodrama and one of the best films of the late British silent era.

Thomas moved to Hollywood, appearing on the stage with Bebe Daniels in The Last of Mrs. Cheyney. He continued to appear in minor roles in various films until his death. Thomas played "King" Westley, the fortune-hunting husband/fiancé of Claudette Colbert in Frank Capra's comedy It Happened One Night. He died from tuberculosis in Sierra Madre, California and was interred at the Hollywood Forever Cemetery in Hollywood.

== Filmography ==
- Chu-Chin-Chow (1923) - Omar
- Decameron Nights (1924) - Imliff
- The Sins Ye Do (1924) - Captain Barrington
- Afraid of Love (1925) - Philip Bryce
- A Daughter of Love (1925) - Dr. Eden Brent
- The Apache (1925) - Gaston d'Harcourt
- The Gold Cure (1925) - Lansing Carter
- The Hound of the Deep (1926) - 'Black' Darley
- Jungle Woman (1926) - 'Black' Darley
- Blighty (1927) - David Marshall
- The Antidote (1927, Short) - Prof. Gilbert Olives
- Roses of Picardy (1927) - Georges d'Archeville
- Poppies of Flanders (1927) - Jim Brown
- The White Sheik (1928) - Westwyn
- The Farmer's Wife (1928) - Farmer Sweetland
- Tesha (1928) - Robert Dobree
- The Apache (1928) - Minor Role (uncredited)
- The Rising Generation (1928) - Major Kent
- Piccadilly (1929) - Valentine Wilmot
- High Treason (1929) - Michael Deane
- Weekend Wives (1929) - Henri Monard
- Power Over Men (1929) - Philippe Garnier
- The Love of the Brothers Rott (1929) - Robert
- The Feather (1929) - Roger Dalton
- The Hate Ship (1929) - Vernon Wolfe
- Elstree Calling (1930, cameo appearance) - Himself
- Extravagance (1930) - Harrison Morrell
- Night Birds (1930) - Deacon Lake
- Lover Come Back (1931) - Yates
- Chances (1931) - Lt. Taylor (uncredited)
- Night Life in Reno (1931) - John Wyatt
- Convicted (1931) - Bruce Allan
- The Devil Plays (1931) - Harry Forrest
- Three Wise Girls (1932) - Arthur Phelps
- Escapade (1932) - John Whitney
- The Trial of Vivienne Ware (1932) - Damon Fenwick
- The Phantom President (1932) - Jerrido
- No More Orchids (1932) - Prince Carlos
- Self Defense (1932) - Jeff Bowman
- The Secret of Madame Blanche (1933) - Jones - a Private Detective (uncredited)
- Brief Moment (1933) - Count Armand
- The Solitaire Man (1933) - Inspector Kenyon (uncredited)
- The Invisible Man (1933) - Hospital Doctor (uncredited)
- Bombay Mail (1934) - Capt. Gerald Worthing
- A Woman's Man (1934) - Roger Pentley - Playboy
- Beggars in Ermine (1934) - James 'Jim' Marley
- It Happened One Night (1934) - "King" Westley
- Stolen Sweets (1934) - Barrington Thorne
- The Scarlet Empress (1934) - Lt. Ovitsyn (uncredited)
- Call It Luck (1934) - Colonel Sir Ridley Quigley (uncredited)
- Jane Eyre (1934) - Charles Craig
- The Moonstone (1934) - Godfrey Ablewhite
- A Lost Lady (1934) - Lord Verrington
- The Curtain Falls (1934) - Martin Deveridge
- Happiness Ahead (1934) - Bradford Servant in Kitchen (uncredited)
- Crimson Romance (1934) - English Officer
- A Successful Failure (1934) - Jerry Franklin, Ruth's Beau
- The World Accuses (1934) - Jerome Rogers
- Sing Sing Nights (1934) - Robert McCaigh
- The Man Who Reclaimed His Head (1934) - Board Director (uncredited)
- The Lives of a Bengal Lancer (1935) - Hendrickson
- Rumba (1935) - Jack Solanger
- Mister Dynamite (1935) - Carey Williams
- Charlie Chan in Egypt (1935) - Dr. Anton Racine
- The Last Outpost (1935) - Cullen
- The Lady in Scarlet (1935) - Dr. Phillip J. Boyer
- Coronado (1935) - Carlton
- Mr. Deeds Goes to Town (1936) - Mr. Semple (uncredited)
- Lady Luck (1936) - Jack Conroy
- House of Secrets (1936) - Coventry
- Girl Loves Boy (1937) - Lawyer Mack
- The League of Frightened Men (1937) - Michael Ayers
- Parnell (1937) - Judge Nanan (uncredited)
- Souls at Sea (1937) - Pelton (uncredited)
- The Man Who Cried Wolf (1937) - George Bradley
- One Hundred Men and a Girl (1937) - Russell
- Death Goes North (1939) - Robert Druid, alias Herbert Barlow
