= G. H. Mulcaster =

British actor (1891–1964)

George Henry Mulcaster
- Born: 27 June 1891; London, England
- Died: 19 January 1964 (aged 72); England
- Occupation: Actor
- Spouse: Diana Napier
- Children: 1

Mulcaster from a Bulldog Drummond programme (early 1920s)

George Henry Mulcaster (27 June 1891 – 19 January 1964) was a London-born British actor. He was the father of the actor Michael Mulcaster, and the first husband of English actress Diana Napier.

== Selected filmography ==
- God Bless Our Red, White and Blue (1918) - The Fiancee
- The Wife Who God Forgot (1920) - Fairfax
- Wild Heather (1921) - John O'Rourke
- The Pipes of Pan (1923) - Irwin Farman
- Mist in the Valley (1923) - Denis Marlow
- The Squire of Long Hadley (1925) - Ronald Neilson
- A Girl of London (1925) - Wilson
- The Wonderful Wooing (1926) - Ronald West
- Sacrifice (1929)
- Inquest (1931) - Charles Wyatt
- Purse Strings (1933) - Edward Ashby
- The Iron Duke (1934) - First Delegate
- The River House Mystery (1935) - Sir John Harpenden
- Second Bureau (1936) - Yvanne Brosilow
- The Five Pound Man (1937) - Sinclair
- Old Mother Riley (1937) - Counsel for Defence
- Little Dolly Daydream (1938) - Warton
- Lily of Laguna (1938) - Gerald Marshall
- The Lion Has Wings (1939) - Controller
- Pack Up Your Troubles (1940) - Col. Diehard
- Night Train to Munich (1940) - Minor Role (uncredited)
- Sailors Don't Care (1940) - Adm. Reynolds
- This Man Is Dangerous (1941) - Lord Morne
- Penn of Pennsylvania (1942) - (uncredited)
- Let the People Sing (1942) - Inspector
- The Dummy Talks (1943) - Piers Harriman
- My Learned Friend (1943) - Dr. Scudamore
- For You Alone (1945) - Rev. Peter Britton
- Under New Management (1946) - William Barclay
- The Courtneys of Curzon Street (1947) - Sir Edward Courtney Sr.
- Spring in Park Lane (1948) - Perkins
- Bonnie Prince Charlie (1948) - The Duke of Newcastle
- That Dangerous Age (1949) - Simmons
- Under Capricorn (1949) - Dr. Macallister
- The Naked Heart (1950) - Le prêtre
- Contraband Spain (1955) - Col. Ingleby
- Lady of Vengeance (1957) - Bennett
- The Hound of the Baskervilles (1959) - Seldon
- Downfall (1964) - Elderly Man (final film role)
