= The Wandering Jew (1923 film) =

1923 film

- Directed by: Maurice Elvey
- Based on: a play by E. Temple Thurston
- Starring: Matheson Lang, Hutin Britton and Malvina Longfellow
- Release date: 1923
- Country: United Kingdom
- Language: Silent

The Wandering Jew is a 1923 British silent fantasy film directed by Maurice Elvey and starring Matheson Lang, Hutin Britton and Malvina Longfellow. It was based on a play by E. Temple Thurston. It was remade in 1933 by Maurice Elvey.

== Premise ==
A Jewish man is condemned to wander aimlessly through the ages.

== Cast ==
- Matheson Lang - Mattathias
- Hutin Britton - Judith
- Malvina Longfellow - Granella
- Isobel Elsom - Olalla Quintane
- Florence Saunders - Joanne
- Shayle Gardner - Pietro Morelli
- Hubert Carter - The Ruler
- Jerrold Robertshaw - Juan de Texada
- Winifred Izard - Rachel
- Fred Raynham - Inquisitor
- Lewis Gilbert - Mario
- Hector Abbas - Zapportas
- Lionel d'Aragon - Raymond
- Gordon Hopkirk - Lover
