= The Wonderful Wooing =

1925 film

The Wonderful Wooing is a 1926 British silent drama film directed by Geoffrey Malins and starring Marjorie Hume, G. H. Mulcaster and Genevieve Townsend. It was based on the 1925 novel The Wonderful Wooing by Douglas Walshe. The screenplay concerns a poor man who falls in love with a much richer woman who is already engaged.

== Cast ==
- Marjorie Hume - Edith Dearing
- G. H. Mulcaster - Ronald West
- Genevieve Townsend - Barbara
- Eric Bransby Williams - Martin
- Tom Coventry - Jenkins
- Daisy Campbell - Mrs West
