= International Cotton Association =

Trade association

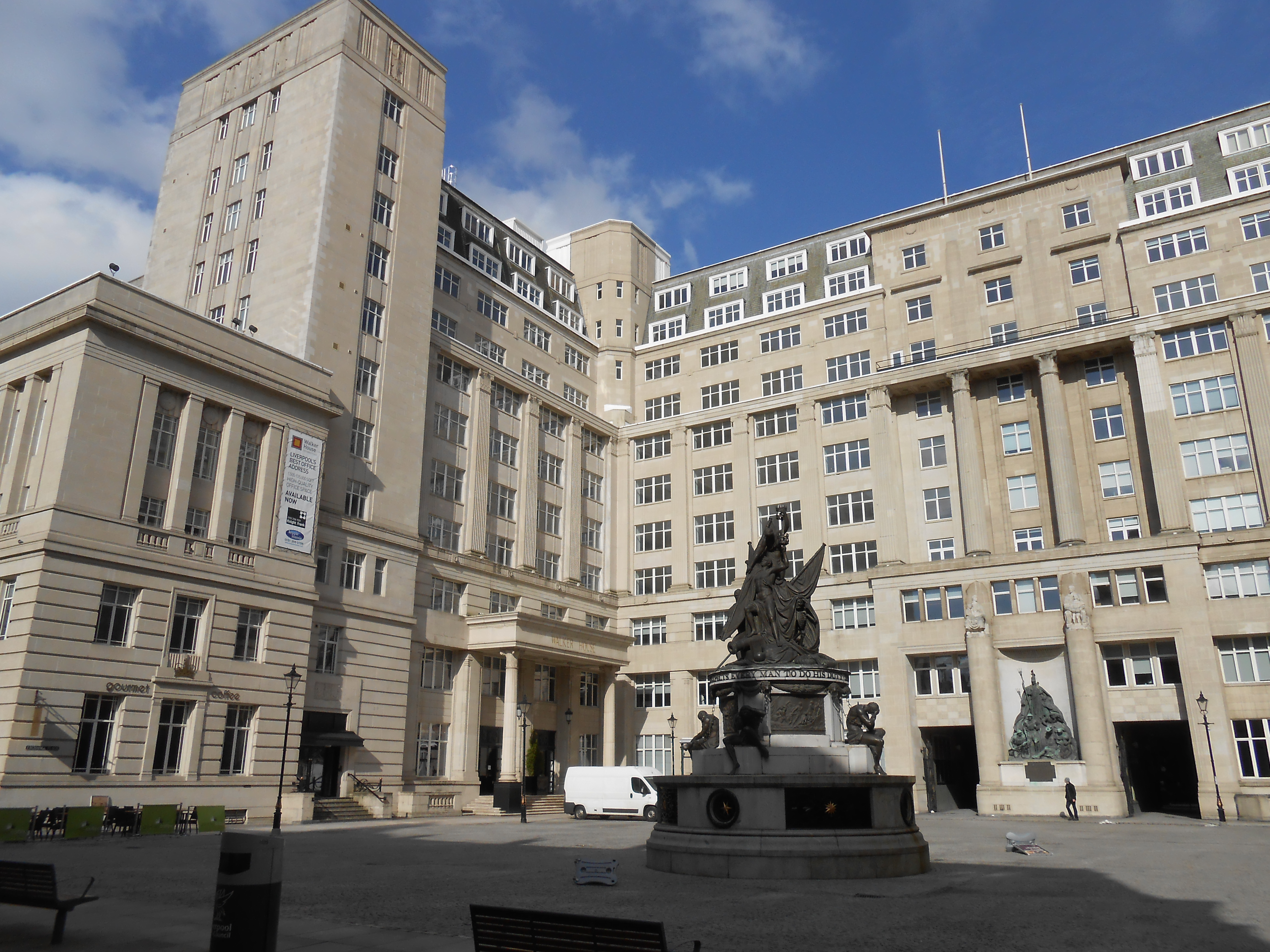
International Cotton Association HQ at Walker House, Exchange Flags complex, Liverpool

The International Cotton Association (ICA) is a trade association and arbitral body that operates on a not-for-profit basis in the commodity of cotton.

Formerly the Liverpool Cotton Association, it was formed in 1841 in Liverpool, UK, by a group of cotton brokers who created a set of trading rules to regulate the sale and purchase of raw cotton.

The ICA is made up of member firms or individuals from the international cotton supply chain.

It is one of the founding members of CICCA (Committee for International Cooperation between Cotton Associations) and has established partnerships with other global cotton associations including the China Cotton Association, Bremen Baumwollboerse and the Gdynia Cotton Association.

== Overview ==
The ICA has two primary functions (the ICA Bylaws and Rules and an arbitration service) and it provides support facilities that include training, trade events, networking forums and cotton testing through a joint venture company (ICA Bremen).

=== ICA Bylaws and Rules ===
The Bylaws and Rules were created in 1863 to regulate the sale and purchase of raw cotton. They can be applied to contracts covering the purchase and sale of cotton between any two companies anywhere in the world. They are updated in line with current industry practice and are published in a variety of languages: the most recent edition was published in January 2023. The Bylaws are binding on members and are incorporated in all member cotton contracts, while the Rules may be changed by agreement between the buyer and the seller in any deal.

=== ICA arbitration ===
If cotton is traded under ICA Bylaws and Rules, parties have the right to apply for ICA arbitration in the event of a contract dispute. The service is impartial and internationally recognised. ICA arbitration awards can be enforced in foreign courts under international law, following an agreement made in New York on 10 June 1958 (The Convention on the Recognition and Enforcement of Foreign Arbitral Awards).

== History ==
In 2011, the ICA's archive collection was catalogued and re-housed at the Liverpool Record Office. Described by Dr Tony Webster, Head of History at Liverpool John Moores University, as "one of the most valuable business resources in the city", the collection contains the history of the evolution of the ICA and the cotton industry. The complete collection from 1798 to 2004 is available online as part of the archive catalogue at the Liverpool Record Office. An abridged version appears below:

=== 1759–1829 ===
The first recorded cotton dealing in Liverpool was a newspaper advertisement for an auction of 28 bags of Jamaican cotton in 1759. Over the next seven decades the Industrial Revolution brought major changes to cotton production. Liverpool enjoyed a physical proximity to the world centre of the industry – the Lancashire cotton towns. It also had well-established trading links with the new powerhouse of raw cotton – the USA. As imports soared to the million-bale mark, Liverpool overtook London as the country's leading cotton importer.

=== 1830–1913 ===
Major improvement to transport and communication systems brought crucial developments. The railways reduced the time and cost of travel and improved reliability in transporting cotton to the Lancashire towns. The Liverpool Cotton Brokers' Association was established in 1841 and it quickly established a successful system of arbitration. The Transatlantic telegraph cable reduced long-distance communication from weeks to minutes. Liverpool broker John Rew recognised the far-reaching implications of this development and created the hedge fund system. This led to the hugely successful Liverpool Cotton Futures Market, which doubled the business of the Liverpool Cotton Market. In 1911-12 Liverpool imported 5,230,399 bales of cotton.

=== 1914–1938 ===
The First World War was a turning point for the Lancashire cotton industry and the Liverpool Cotton Market. The demand for cotton in India and China was now being met by the cotton mills of Japan and India. Lancashire could not compete with their cheaper labour and products. Its Far East market collapsed and cotton imports to Liverpool halved. Further problems came with the decimation of the American crop of 1921 by the ravages of the boll weevil. The Wall Street crash of 1929 brought with it the Great Depression and the effect on the Liverpool cotton market was severe: in 1931 Liverpool's cotton imports were at their lowest for 62 years.

=== 1939–2012 ===
The Second World War sealed the Liverpool Cotton Market's fate. U-boat attacks and the bombing of ports and cities threatened cotton supplies and resulted in drastic action. The government took responsibility for purchase and distribution and the Liverpool Cotton Futures Market closed. After the War the Raw Cotton Commission became the sole importer and distributor of cotton. The Cotton Market reopened in 1954, but as a shadow of its former self. In 1963 the Liverpool Cotton Association successfully reinvented itself and re-energised its membership, concentrating on the provision of specialist services such as arbitration. The association became increasingly global in its outlook and this was reflected in its name change in 2004 to the International Cotton Association.

== Contractual provisions ==
Under the Bylaws applicable contractually to all member cotton transactions, special arrangements are made for dealing with circumstances where a contract "has not been, or will not be performed". Where this arises, the contract is not cancelled but it is "invoiced back in accordance with the Rules in place at the date of the contract". The practice of "invoicing back" has been described as "a source of contention" by the UK courts because the clause which enforce it takes no account of which party is responsible for the contractual non-performance. Mr Justice Burton, in Dunavant Enterprises Inc. v Olympia Spinning and Weaving Mills Ltd. (2011), refers to a series of legal cases from 1911 onwards where there has been judicial criticism of invoicing back clauses.
