= Douglas Percival Cooper =

British cinematographer (1875–1950)

- Born: 1875; Stourbridge, Worcestershire, United Kingdom
- Died: 25 April 1950 (aged 74–75); Richmond, Surrey, United Kingdom
- Other name: D.P. Cooper
- Occupation: Cinematographer
- Years active: 1918-1947 (film)

Douglas Percival Cooper (1875-1950) was a British cinematographer. He is generally credited as D. P. Cooper.

He was the father of Wilkie Cooper, who also became a cinematographer.

== Selected filmography ==
- The Indian Love Lyrics (1923)
- A Woman Redeemed (1927)
- The King's Highway (1927)
- The Guns of Loos (1928)
- A Royal Demand (1933)
- The Television Follies (1933)
- Toilers of the Sea (1936)
- Trunk Crime (1939)
- Inquest (1939)
- The Greed of William Hart (1948)

== Bibliography ==
- Stephen Chibnall & Brian McFarlane. Quota Quickies. British Film Institute, 2007.
