= The Nonentity =

1922 film

- Directed by: Sinclair Hill
- Written by: Sinclair Hill
- Starring: Annette Benson; Hugh Buckler; Daisy Campbell
- Production company: Stoll Pictures
- Distributed by: Stoll Pictures
- Release date: November 1922
- Country: United Kingdom
- Languages: Silent; English intertitles

The Nonentity is a 1922 British silent adventure film directed by Sinclair Hill and starring Annette Benson, Hugh Buckler and Daisy Campbell.

== Plot ==
The story concerns an aristocrat who goes undercover in British India to rescue a woman.

== Cast ==
- Annette Benson as Beryl Danvers
- Hugh Buckler as Lord Ronald Prior
- Daisy Campbell as Mrs. Ellis
- Bryan Powley as Robert Ellis

== Bibliography ==
- Murphy, Robert. Directors in British and Irish Cinema: A Reference Companion. BFI, 2006.
