= Extravagance (1930 film) =

1930 film by Phil Rosen

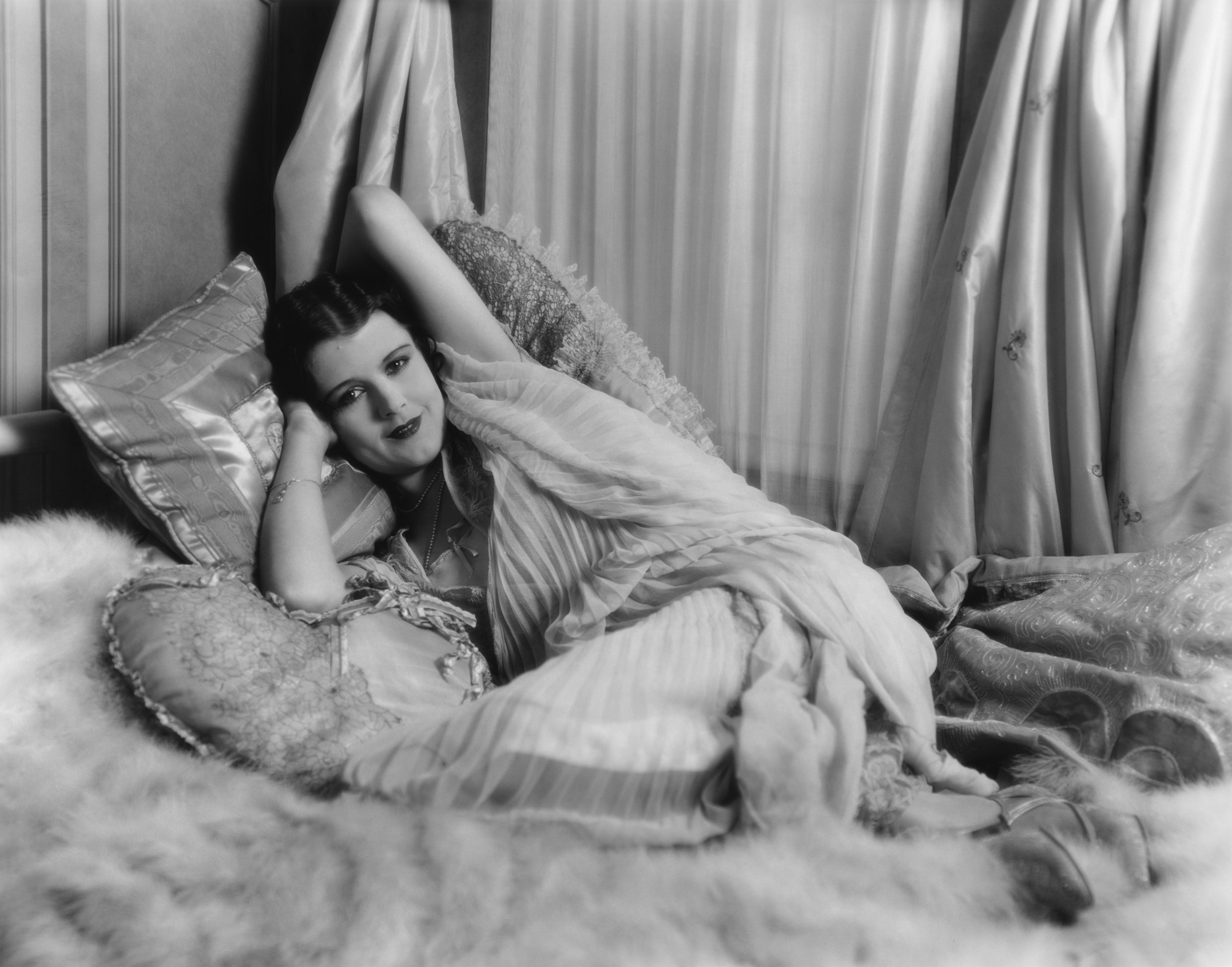
- Film still with June Collyer
- Directed by: Phil Rosen
- Written by: Adele Buffington; Phil Rosen; Frances Hyland (scenario)
- Story by: A.P. Younger
- Starring: June Collyer; Lloyd Hughes; Owen Moore
- Cinematography: Max Dupont
- Edited by: Charles Harris
- Distributed by: Tiffany Pictures
- Release date: October 10, 1930
- Running time: 71 minutes
- Country: United States
- Language: English

Extravagance is a 1930 pre-Code film directed by Phil Rosen and released by Tiffany Pictures.

== Plot ==
Extravagance (1930)

Alice Kendall is the darling of her social set, the sons and daughters of millionaires. Unknown to Alice, her mother has impoverished herself to provide Alice the luxuries she expects. When Alice becomes engaged to businessman Fred Garlan, her mother spends the last of her money on Alice's trousseau.

Feeling stifled in her marriage because of Fred's long hours, Alice spends more than Fred can earn, causing strain in the marriage. When she asks for a sable coat like her friend owns, Fred makes it clear they cannot afford it.

When a well-known playboy named Morrell helps her get one through a phony stock deal, Alice and Fred's marriage is brought to the breaking point.

== Cast ==
- June Collyer as Alice Kendall
- Lloyd Hughes as Fred Garlan
- Owen Moore as Jim Hamilton
- Dorothy Christy as Esther Hamilton
- Jameson Thomas as Morrell
- Gwen Lee as Sally
- Robert Agnew as Billy
- Nella Walker as Mrs. Kendall
- Martha Mattox as Guest
- Arthur Hoyt as Guest

== Home media ==
Extravagance was released on Region 0 DVD-R by Alpha Video on January 28, 2014.
