= The Squire of Long Hadley =

1925 film

- Directed by: Sinclair Hill
- Written by: E. Newton Bungey (novel); Sinclair Hill
- Starring: Marjorie Hume; Brian Aherne; Eileen Dennes
- Production company: Stoll Pictures
- Distributed by: Stoll Pictures
- Release date: 1 May 1925
- Country: United Kingdom
- Languages: Silent; English intertitles

The Squire of Long Hadley is a 1925 British silent drama film directed by Sinclair Hill and starring Marjorie Hume, Brian Aherne and G. H. Mulcaster It was adapted from a novel by E. Newton Bungey and was also known under the alternative title of Romance of Riches.

== Premise ==
A social-climbing businessman becomes a squire of a village.

== Cast ==
- Marjorie Hume as Marjorie Clayton
- Brian Aherne as Jim Luttrell
- G. H. Mulcaster as Ronald Neilson
- Eileen Dennes as Lucy
- Albert E. Raynor as Robert Clayton
- Tom Coventry as Barker
- Mabel Penn as Mrs Mopps
- Margaret Reeve as Liz
- Humberston Wright as Solicitor

== Bibliography ==
- Low, Rachael. History of the British Film, 1918-1929. George Allen & Unwin, 1971.
