= Tom Coventry =

British actor (1856–1932)

Tom Coventry (1856 – 1 December 1932) was a British actor.

Coventry was born in Matangi near Hamilton, New Zealand and died, aged 76, in Ealing, London.

== Selected filmography ==
- Five Nights (1915)
- The New Clown (1916)
- A Fortune at Stake (1918)
- Convict 99 (1919) - Hewett
- Class and No Class (1921)
- The Double Event (1921)
- Mary Find the Gold (1921)
- The House of Peril (1922)
- A Sporting Double (1922)
- A Gipsy Cavalier (1922)
- Sam's Boy (1922)
- The Sporting Instinct (1922)
- The Monkey's Paw (1923)
- Paddy the Next Best Thing (1923)
- Dixon's Return (1924)
- Claude Duval (1924)
- The Wonderful Wooing (1925)
- The Squire of Long Hadley (1925)
- Nell Gwyn (1926)
- Second to None (1927)
- The Guns of Loos (1928)
- Under the Greenwood Tree (1929)
