= Miss Charity =

1921 British film

- Directed by: Edwin J. Collins
- Written by: Keble Howard (novel)
- Produced by: Harry B. Parkinson
- Starring: Margery Meadows; Dick Webb; Joan Lockton
- Production company: Master Film Company
- Distributed by: Butcher's Film Service
- Release date: 1921
- Country: United Kingdom
- Languages: Silent; English intertitles

Miss Charity is a 1921 British silent romance film directed by Edwin J. Collins and starring Margery Meadows, Dick Webb and Joan Lockton. It was based on the 1908 novel by Keble Howard, who praised the final film.

== Cast ==
- Margery Meadows ... Charity Couchman
- Dick Webb ... John Coghill
- Joan Lockton ... Philippa
- Ralph Forster ... Rev Walter Couchman
- James Read ... Crazy Jim
