= The Secret Kingdom (film) =

1925 film

- Directed by: Sinclair Hill
- Written by: Bertram Atkey (novel); Alicia Ramsey
- Produced by: Sinclair Hill
- Starring: Matheson Lang; Stella Arbenina; Eric Bransby Williams
- Production company: Stoll Pictures
- Distributed by: Stoll Pictures
- Release date: August 1925
- Country: United Kingdom
- Languages: Silent; English intertitles

The Secret Kingdom is a 1925 British silent fantasy, and science fiction film. It was directed by Sinclair Hill, and starred Matheson Lang, Stella Arbenina and Eric Bransby Williams. It is an adaptation of the novel The Hidden Fire by Bertram Atkey. The screenplay concerns a wealthy man who acquires a mind-reading machine, but is soon horrified to discover what people are really thinking. It was shot at Cricklewood Studios in London, it was re-issued in 1929 under the alternative title of Beyond the Veil.

== Cast ==
- Matheson Lang as John Quarrain
- Stella Arbenina as Mary Quarrain
- Eric Bransby Williams as Philip Darent
- Genevieve Townsend as The Secretary
- Rudolph de Cordova as The Protege
- Robin Irvine as The Son
- Lilian Oldland as The Daughter
- Frank Goldsmith as Henry

== Bibliography ==
- Low, Rachael. History of the British Film, 1918-1929. George Allen & Unwin, 1971.
