= Dorothy Christy =

American actress (1906–1977)

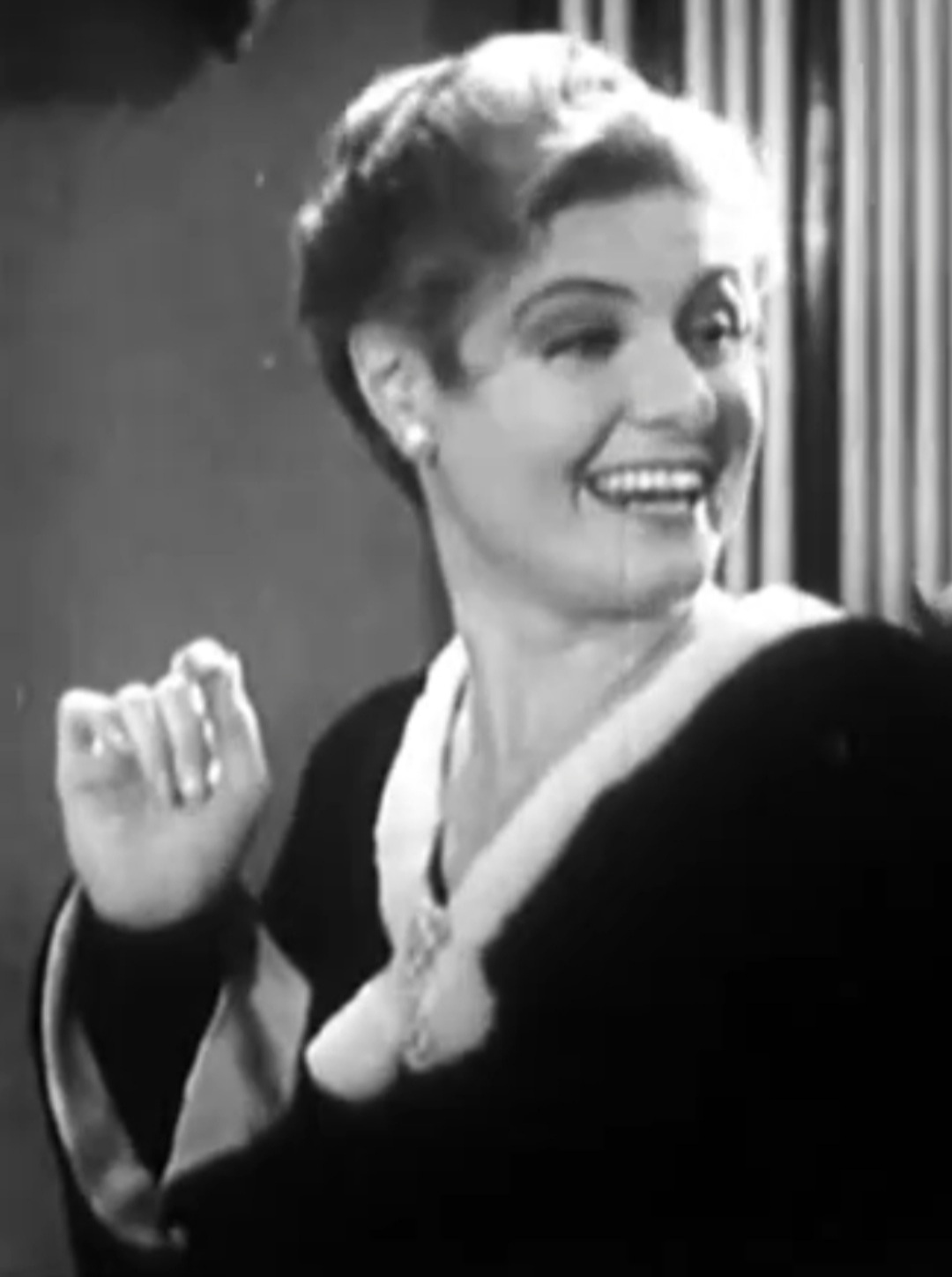
- Christy in Extravagance (1930)
- Born: Dorothea J. Seltzer; May 26, 1900; Reading, Pennsylvania, U.S.
- Died: May 21, 1977 (aged 76); Santa Monica, California, U.S.
- Other name: Dorothy Rucker
- Occupation: Actress
- Years active: 1929–1953
- Spouses: Harold Christy (div. 1936) Rollin Rucker (died 1970)
- Children: 1

Dorothy Christy (born Dorothea Jean Seltzer, later Dorothy Rucker; May 26, 1900 – May 21, 1977) was an American actress. She was sometimes billed as Dorothy Christie.

== Early years ==
Christy was born Dorothea Jean Seltzer on May 26, 1900, in Reading, Pennsylvania. She was the daughter of Mr. and Mrs. John C. Seltzer. Although she sometimes participated in amateur plays, she had no plans for an acting career. After attending public schools in Reading, she went to Beachwood (a finishing school near Philadelphia) and then to Dana Hall School near Boston. She went on to study opera.

== Career ==
Christy earned a theatrical arts degree from the American Academy of Dramatic Arts in New York City, New York. When she began her stage career, Christy sought out famous Broadway producer Florenz Ziegfeld, Jr. Ziegfeld signed her on as a showgirl with no lines and agreed to pay her $100 a week. An hour after signing her contract, Christy reconsidered this decision and decided instead to reach out to theatrical producing firm Schwab and Mandel. Schwab and Mandel signed her onto a three-year contract. She then got her first part as an understudy and was called to substitute for a lead actress within a week.

As Christy's success on Broadway grew, she was a member of the ensemble of The New Moon (1928) and portrayed Olive in Follow Thru (1929). While attending a social function at the Russian Tea Room, Christy was introduced to director Lloyd French who helped her get started in the film industry under his supervision, beginning with an uncredited role in the Laurel and Hardy film That's My Wife! (1929). Christy went on to become a successful character actress and appeared in over 100 feature films. Christy acted with Will Rogers, Buster Keaton and the Marx Brothers (appearing in the pre-filming stage version of A Night at the Opera) and with Stan Laurel and Oliver Hardy in the film Sons of the Desert (1933), in the role of Mrs. Laurel. She was Queen Tika of Murania in The Phantom Empire, Gene Autry’s 1935 cliffhanger serial.

During her career, Christy was active in the film industry and in her community. She was a member of the Screen Actors Guild and the Hollywood Democratic Committee as well as a member of the Methodist church and a charwoman for her local divisions of the American Red Cross and the Boys & Girls Clubs of America. Christy retired from acting in 1953.

== Personal life ==
On January 2, 1936, Christy was divorced from songwriter Hal Christy. She went on to marry film executive Rollin Rucker and the two had one son.

== Selected filmography ==
- So This Is London (1930)
- She Got What She Wanted (1930)
- Playboy of Paris (1930)
- Big Money (1930)
- Extravagance (1930)
- Free Love (1930)
- Parlor, Bedroom and Bath (1931) (credited as Dorothy Christie)
- Big Business Girl (1931)
- Caught Cheating (1931)
- The Devil Plays (1931)
- Convicted (1931)
- Forbidden Company (1932)
- The Arm of the Law (1932)
- Shop Angel (1932)
- Sons of the Desert (1933) as Mrs. Betty Laurel
- Love Birds (1934)
- Bright Eyes (1934)
- One Exciting Adventure (1934)
- The Phantom Empire (1935)
- Slave Ship (1937)
- Man from Cheyenne (1942)
- The Magnificent Rogue (1946)
- The Pilgrim Lady (1947)
- So Big (1953)
