= Poppies of Flanders =

1927 film

- Directed by: Arthur Maude
- Written by: Herman C. McNeile; Violet E. Powell
- Starring: Jameson Thomas; Eve Gray; Henry Vibart; Daisy Campbell
- Cinematography: George Pocknall
- Edited by: Sam Simmonds
- Production company: British International Pictures
- Distributed by: Wardour Films
- Release date: October 1927
- Running time: 8,700
- Country: United Kingdom
- Language: English

Poppies of Flanders is a 1927 British drama film directed by Arthur Maude, and starring Jameson Thomas, Eve Gray and Henry Vibart. It was based on a novel by Herman C. McNeile.

== Cast ==
- Jameson Thomas as Jim Brown
- Eve Gray as Beryl Kingwood
- Henry Vibart as Earl of Strangeways
- Gibb McLaughlin as Shorty Bill
- Daisy Campbell as Countess of Strangeways
- Malcolm Tod as Bob Standish
- Cameron Carr as Merrick
- Tubby Phillips as Fat Man

== Bibliography ==
- Low, Rachael. History of the British Film, 1918–1929. George Allen & Unwin, 1971.
