= A Sporting Double =

1922 film

- Directed by: Arthur Rooke
- Written by: Arthur Rooke
- Starring: John Stuart; Lilian Douglas; Douglas Munro
- Production company: I.B. Davidson
- Distributed by: Granger Films
- Release date: July 1922
- Country: United Kingdom
- Languages: Silent; English intertitles

A Sporting Double is a 1922 British silent drama film directed by Arthur Rooke and starring John Stuart, Lilian Douglas and Douglas Munro. The film is set in the horse racing world. It was re-released in 1926 by Butcher's Film Service.

== Cast ==
- John Stuart as Will Blunt
- Lilian Douglas as Ethel Grimshaw
- Douglas Munro as John Brent
- Humberston Wright as Henry Maxwell
- Terence Cavanagh as Philip Harvey
- Tom Coventry as Bargee
- Frank Gray as Henry Grimshaw
- Myrtle Vibart as Aurora

== See also ==
- List of films about horses
- List of films about horse racing

== Bibliography ==
- Low, Rachael. History of the British Film, 1918-1929. George Allen & Unwin, 1971.
