= Dick Webb (actor) =

British actor

Dick Webb was a British stage and film actor of the silent era.

== Selected filmography ==
- Kent, the Fighting Man (1916)
- Angel Esquire (1919)
- The Channings (1920)
- Miss Charity (1921)
- The Croxley Master (1921)
- The Scarlet Letter (1922)
- Potter's Clay (1922)
- Young Lochinvar (1923)
