= The Chinese Bungalow (1930 film) =

1930 British film by Arthur Barnes and J.B. Williams

- Opening titles
- Directed by: Arthur Barnes; J.B. Williams
- Based on: play by Marion Osmond and James Corbet
- Starring: Matheson Lang; Jill Esmond; Anna Neagle
- Cinematography: Claude McDonnell
- Production company: Neo Art Productions
- Release date: 8 June 1931
- Running time: 74 minutes
- Country: United Kingdom
- Language: English

The Chinese Bungalow is a 1930 British drama film directed by Arthur Barnes and J.B. Williams and starring Matheson Lang, Jill Esmond and Anna Neagle. It was based on the 1925 play The Chinese Bungalow by Marion Osmond and James Corbet.

Lang had played the same role in the 1926 version of the film.

While working on the film Williams convinced the actress Marjorie Robertson to change her name to Anna Neagle.

== Plot ==
When wealthy Yuan Sing finds out that his European wife Jean is having an affaire with Harold Marquess, he transfers his affection to Jean's sister Charlotte, who is herself in love with Harold's brother Richard. When Harold disappears, Richard holds Sing responsible, and later Jean too vanishes. Sing and Richard meet, and drink wine together. Sing states that they are both in love with the same woman, and that one of the wine glasses was poisoned, but he does not know which, saying fate will decide who dies. It is Sing.

== Cast ==
- Matheson Lang as Yuan Sing
- Jill Esmond as Jean
- Anna Neagle as Charlotte
- Ballard Berkeley as Richard Marquess
- Derek Williams as Harold Marquess

== Reception ==
Film Weekly wrote: "Matheson Lang makes a successful appearance in this talkie of his well-known stage-play. His performance is as good as it was on the stage and constitutes the main – almost the entire appeal of the film. The story, well known to most people, is interesting enough, and has a strong climax. There is not enough incident, however, neither is the treatment of what there is enterprising enough to make the film gripping from he point of view of narrative."

Kine Weekly wrote: "This colourtul drama of the Orient will no doubt emulate the success of the stage play, from which it is adapted, for it is embued with the fascination and glamour of the East, and features a capable and popular English star in Matheson Lang. As for the story, it is a trifle thin and ingenuous, and depends on the atmosphere and personalities of the players for its appeal. ...This is a literal adaptation of the stage play, and the weaknesses in the construction of the drama, which lacks subtlety, are rather apparent."

The Daily Film Renter wrote: "Acting adequate, but continuity and dramatic presentation is open to criticism. .... Neither Jill Esmond Moore nor Anna Neagle impressed us. In fact, the cast, which also includes Derek Williams and Ballard Berkeley, seem to be somewhat out of touch with the atmosphere of the play, probably due to the tremendous difficulties of securing the vivid atmosphere of China, while at the same time maintaining dramatic sequence."
