= Alfred Edward Rodewald =

English musician (1862–1903)

Alfred Edward Rodewald (1862 – 1903) was an English musician, but a merchant by profession. He developed the Liverpool Orchestral Society to become a large semi-professional orchestra of distinction. He was a close friend of the English composer, Edward Elgar and the Austro-Hungarian conductor Hans Richter.

== Family background ==
Alfred Edward Rodewald was born on 28 January 1862 in Mossley Hill, then part of the Township of Wavertree, Lancashire, England, but now a suburb of Liverpool. He was baptised at the Church of St Anne [C of E], Aigburth, on 22 May 1862. Mossley Hill Church had not yet been built. He never married and died suddenly at his home in Liverpool on 9 November 1903. His ashes are interred in the family grave at Toxteth Park Cemetery, Liverpool. Numerous obituaries were written. On 17 November 2008, the Rodewald Concert Society, with support from the Elgar Society, placed a blue plaque on his former home.

His grandfather, Johann Friedrich Arnold Rodewald (1782-1835) was a very successful businessman in Bremen, Germany. and was instrumental in the founding of the seaport of Bremerhaven. His father, Carl (Charles) Ferdinand Rodewald (1820-1906), was born in Bremen, but moved to America where he met his wife Amelia Mary Elizabeth Byrne (1833-1905). and eventually became a British citizen. His maternal grandfather was John Bligh Byrne (1793-1848) who had emigrated from Lurgan, County Armagh, Northern Ireland, to New Orleans, Louisiana, USA. The family moved to Liverpool, at about the time of the American Civil War, joining some of his wife's family. J B Byrne had died by then but his half-brother, Charles Holtzendorff Byrne (1782-1853), a sail maker, had already settled in Liverpool after moving from the shipping industry in Scotland. Whether J B Byrne's widow, Madeleine Azemia née Remy (1803-1884), also moved to Liverpool is uncertain. She was still in New Orleans in 1850, and died in Paris, where she may have been living or on a visit to relatives, but she is buried in Liverpool.

There are family connections on his father's side with the painter, James Abbott McNeill Whistler, the campaigner for women's education in Germany, Verena Rodewald (1834-1903), the German politician, Hermann Rodewald (1869-1945), the conductor and former president of the Rodewald Concert Society, Sir Adrian Boult (1899-1983), the historian and University of Manchester benefactor, Cosmo Alastair Rodewald (1915–2002) and Donna Margherita Princess of Ruspoli (d 1954, see Ruspoli family). On his mother's side, the naval architect, St Clare John Byrne (1830-1915) and the historian, Muriel St. Clare Byrne (1895-1983) are descendants of C H Byrne, and there is an indirect link to John Bligh, 4th Earl of Darnley.

== Early years ==
Rodewald was educated at Charterhouse School up to the age of 17 and thereafter in France and Germany but little is known about his later education. At school he had no particular academic or sporting distinction but sang in the choir and played violin in the orchestra. He also played the piano and, at some stage, he changed to the double bass.

== Professional career ==
Rodewald started his career as a clerk with a London bank, but soon joined his father's firm of Rodewald & Co in Liverpool. This firm seems to have traded cotton and other merchandise from America. His elder brother John Ferdinand Byrne Rodewald (1856-1891) also joined the firm from America, allowing the father to retire to London. Unfortunately he died suddenly in 1891 leaving Alfred to take over the business at age 29. The cotton trade was a big industry at that time, being imported from America to Liverpool and then traded to the mills in Manchester and other Lancashire towns via rail and the Manchester Ship Canal. Alfred was elected to the board of The Liverpool Cotton Association (now the International Cotton Association) but resigned after only a few weeks (for reasons unknown). The cotton trade had numerous setbacks during Rodewald's time which must have made his life stressful and may have affected his health. He had other business interests being a director of the North British and Mercantile Insurance and Secretary of the Bimetallist Society (see Bimetalism).

== Musical career ==
Little is known of Rodewald's musical education and he was probably mostly self-taught after leaving school, but during his time in Germany he may have come under the influence of his uncle Herman George Rodewald (1815-1891) who, after a successful business career in South America retired back to Bremen in 1858 to devote himself to music. He played the double bass in the Lower Rhine Music Festival (Niederrheinisches Musikfest) and it was here that he first met the conductor, Hans Richter, (Director of the Festival 1877 and 1878) who became a lifelong friend. In 1884 Rodewald joined Father James Nugent’s Liverpool Peoples’ Orchestra as a double bass player and had taken over the role of conductor by 1886. He developed this orchestra to a high standard and reformed it in 1890 as the Liverpool Orchestral Society which eventually became a large semi-professional orchestra, well respected throughout the country. As well as conducting and playing the double bass (in other orchestras), he gave regular lectures on music in the Rotunda (later known as Picton Hall and now part of the Liverpool Central Library). In 1900 Rodewald took over the conductorship of the New Brighton Tower Orchestra on Granville Bantock’s appointment as Principal of the new school of music at the Birmingham Midland Institute (now the Royal Birmingham Conservatoire). He was a great admirer of Wagner and a champion of the modern composers of his day, such as Tchaikovsky, Antonin Dvorak and Richard Strauss and in particular British composers such as Alexander Mackenzie and Hamish MacCunn as well as Elgar, Granville Bantock and Charles Villiers Stanford.

Granville Bantock introduced Rodewald to Edward Elgar and they became very close friends. Elgar conducted the first performance of his first two Pomp and Circumstance Marches at a concert given by the Liverpool Orchestral Society in the old Philharmonic Hall, Liverpool. No 1 (which became ‘Land of Hope and Glory’) was dedicated to Rodewald and the Liverpool Orchestral Society and No 2 was dedicated to Bantock. Rodewald was also a close friend of Hans Richter, the Hallé Orchestra’s Austrian conductor and it is said that he was Richter’s only conducting pupil. Elgar was devastated by Rodewald’s sudden death. Having reached Liverpool just too late to see him, he wandered the street in a daze. Richter took over the concert being prepared by Rodewald at the time of his death, as a memorial concert following his sudden demise.

In 1911 a group of friends founded the Rodewald Concert Club, later renamed the Rodewald Concert Society, in his memory with the support of the composer, Charles Villiers Stanford (elected as the first President) and famous baritone, Harry Plunket Greene. On Stanford’s death, Elgar was invited to become the President of the Society. However, he declined in an infamous letter saying that orchestral concerts should have been maintained as Rodewald’s memorial and that chamber music was inadequate. This response outraged the committee. Elgar’s view was also shared by Bowden who supported the idea being canvassed at the time that official recognition of the Society should be given by creation of a Liverpool Municipal Orchestra.

A commemorative plaque was placed on Rodewald’s final residence at 66 Huskisson Street, Liverpool, L8 7LR by the Rodewald Concert Society with support from the Elgar Society and a suite in the refurbished Philharmonic Hall was named the ‘Rodewald Suite’. Sadly this part of the Hall has since been redeveloped and the name has not been retained.

== Rodewald the man ==
Alfred Rodewald was a very tall man (6 feet 3 inches) with a commanding presence and a great sense of humour. He was a strict disciplinarian. Although he does not appear to have been active in sport at school, he was obviously a fit man. He played both cricket and football for his old boys’ club and was a keen cyclist. He, Elgar and his colleague Mignot cycled from his holiday home at Betws-y-Coed to Tremadog and back, quite a feat considering the steep hills, cycles without the numerous gears of a modern bicycle and the road surfaces at that time. He conducted with tact, energy and enthusiasm. He was a perpetrator of many pranks, known as ’Japes’. The most elaborate of these was the secret society, STP, which stood for ‘Skip the Pavement’. This referred to the need to hurry to the local hostelry after a concert for a quick drink before closing. Members included Bantock, Elgar, Ernest Newman, Ivor Atkins, Troyte Griffith (Enigma Variations No. VII) and possibly Richter, Havergal Brian, and Sir Frederic Hymen Cowen. From his orchestra he expected commitment and as close to perfection as possible, often repeating passages many times in an attempt to achieve this.

== Sources ==
1. Rodewald Concert Society archives: Liverpool Record Office ref. 780 RCS.
2. John E. Kelly, Elgar’s Best Friend: Alfred Rodewald of Liverpool, Carnegie Publishing Ltd, Lancaster, 2013, ISBN 978-1-85936-221-1
3. Sekunda, Nicholas, Ed., Corolla Cosmo Rodewald, Foundation for the Development of Gdansk University, 2001, ISBN 978-8375310603
4. Byrne-Rothwell, Daniel, Ed. The Byrnes and the O’Byrnes, Vol 3, House of Lochar publishers, Isle of Colonsay, Scotland, 2012, ISBN 978-1-904817-05-5
5. Boult, David, A Boult Album, (family publication) 2003, Liverpool Record Office ref Hq 942 707 092 Bou
6. Darren Henley & Vincent McKernan, The Original Liverpool Sound, Liverpool University Press, 2009, ISBN 9781846312243
7. Bowden, W. J., Alfred Edward Rodewald :Merchant and Musician, The Musical Standard, 19 September 1903
8. Benas¸ Bertram B., Merseyside Orchestras: An Introduction to the History of Local Instrumental Music, Transactions of the Historic Society of Lancashire and Cheshire Vol 95, 1943
9. Crowther, Anne L., Alfred Rodewald and the Liverpool Orchestral Society, The Elgar Society Journal, Vol 6 No 1, 2009
10. Rohdewald, Wolfgang, Roots Web's World Connect Project: Rodewald, Der Rodewalde Gerschlecht, Table XII, 4
