= Confessions (1925 film) =

1925 British film by W. P. Kellino

Not for Sale
- Directed by: W. P. Kellino
- Written by: Lydia Hayward
- Based on: Confession Corner by Baillie Reynolds
- Starring: Ian Hunter; Joan Lockton; Eric Bransby Williams; Gladys Hamer
- Cinematography: Jack E. Cox
- Production company: Stoll Pictures
- Distributed by: Stoll Pictures
- Release date: June 1925
- Running time: 6,200 feet
- Country: United Kingdom
- Languages: Silent; English intertitles

Confessions is a 1925 British silent comedy film directed by W. P. Kellino and starring Ian Hunter, Joan Lockton and Eric Bransby Williams. It was based on the novel Confession Corner by Baillie Reynolds.

== Cast ==
- Ian Hunter as Charles Oddy
- Joan Lockton as Phoebe Vollings
- Eric Bransby Williams as Percy Denham
- Gladys Hamer as Ada Best
- Fred Raynham as E.H. Slack
- W.G. Saunders as James Barnes
- Lewis Shaw as Henry
- Moore Marriott as Hardy
- Lewis Gilbert as Mr. Vallings
- Dodo Watts as Child

== Bibliography ==
- Low, Rachael. History of the British Film, 1918-1929. George Allen & Unwin, 1971.
