= Sinclair Hill =

British film director and screenwriter (1896–1945)

- Born: 10 June 1896; Surbiton, Surrey, England, United Kingdom of Great Britain and Ireland
- Died: 6 March 1945 (aged 48); Buxton, Derbyshire, England, United Kingdom
- Occupations: Director, Producer, Writer
- Years active: 1920–1938 (film)

Sinclair Hill (10 June 1896 – 6 March 1945) was a British film director, producer and screenwriter. He directed nearly fifty films between 1920 and 1939. He was born as George Sinclair-Hill in London in 1894. He was awarded an OBE for his services to film.

Hill was employed by Stoll Pictures in the 1920s and Gainsborough Pictures in the 1930s.

== Filmography ==
- At the Villa Rose (1920)
- The Hundredth Chance (1920)
- The Tidal Wave (1920)
- The Tavern Knight (1920)
- A Question of Trust (1920)
- The Place of Honour (1921)
- The Mystery of Mr. Bernard Brown (1921)
- The Nonentity (1921)
- The Lonely Lady of Grosvenor Square (1922)
- The Experiment (1922)
- Half a Truth (1922)
- Petticoat Loose (1922)
- The Truants (1922)
- Open Country (1922)
- Expiation (1922)
- The Indian Love Lyrics (1923)
- Don Quixote (1923)
- One Arabian Night (1923)
- The Conspirators (1924)
- White Slippers (1924)
- The Prehistoric Man (1924)
- The Secret Kingdom (1925)
- The Presumption of Stanley Hay, MP (1925)
- The Squire of Long Hadley (1925)
- The Qualified Adventurer (1926)
- Sahara Love (1926)
- The Chinese Bungalow (1926)
- The King's Highway (1927)
- A Woman Redeemed (1927)
- The Price of Divorce (1928)
- Boadicea (1928)
- The Guns of Loos (1928)
- The Unwritten Law (1929)
- Greek Street (1930)
- Dark Red Roses (1930)
- Such Is the Law (1930)
- The Great Gay Road (1931)
- Other People's Sins (1931)
- A Gentleman of Paris (1931)
- The First Mrs. Fraser (1932)
- The Man from Toronto (1933)
- Britannia of Billingsgate (1933)
- My Old Dutch (1934)
- Hyde Park Corner (1935)
- The Cardinal (1936)
- The Gay Adventure (1936)
- Take a Chance (1937)
- Command Performance (1937)
- Midnight Menace (1937)
- Follow Your Star (1938)
