= The Qualified Adventurer =

1925 British film by Sinclair Hill

- Directed by: Sinclair Hill
- Written by: Selwyn Jepson (novel); Sinclair Hill
- Starring: Matheson Lang; Genevieve Townsend; Fred Raynham
- Production company: Stoll Pictures
- Distributed by: Stoll Pictures
- Release date: 1925
- Country: United Kingdom
- Languages: Silent; English intertitles

The Qualified Adventurer is a 1925 British silent adventure film directed by Sinclair Hill and starring Matheson Lang, Genevieve Townsend, and Fred Raynham. It was based on the 1922 novel The Qualified Adventurer by Selwyn Jepson.

== Cast ==
- Matheson Lang as Peter Duff
- Genevieve Townsend as Jimmy Fellowes
- Fred Raynham as Northcote
- Kiyoshi Takase as Yen San
- Cameron Carr as Weames
- Nelson Ramsey as McNab
- Moore Marriott as Bosun
- Wyndham Guise as Captain Fellowes
- Dave O'Toole as Evans

== Bibliography ==
- Low, Rachael. History of the British Film, 1918-1929. George Allen & Unwin, 1971.
