= Ernest Bryson =

Scottish composer

Robert Ernest Bryson (30 March 1867 – 16 April 1942) was a Scottish composer and organist who spent much of his life in Oxton, Cheshire, England, working as a cotton merchant in Liverpool. He was the founder-chairman and later President of the Rodewald Concert Society in Liverpool.

== Early life and education ==
Robert Ernest Bryson (known as a composer more often as just Ernest Bryson), was born in Milton, Glasgow, Scotland on 30 March 1867 and died 16 April 1942 in St Briavels, Gloucestershire. He was the only son of Robert Bryson (1831–1886), a cotton merchant, and Margaret Bryson (née Young, 1839–1936). At an early age, he was brought to Tranmere, Birkenhead (then part of Cheshire, England) by his parents, along with his three sisters. Bryson was educated at Birkenhead School (1877–81).

He purchased Yew Tree Cottage at St Briavels, Gloucestershire, in 1907 as a country residence and was registered there as a voter from 1910. He, and his three sisters all died there unmarried, along with their widowed mother.

== Career ==
Bryson joined his father's firm of Bryson, Cooper & Co, cotton brokers, of Liverpool as an apprentice at the age of 17. He became a partner on his father's death. In 1893 he was elected to the board of the Liverpool Cotton Association but resigned after only a few weeks for no known reason.

Bryson studied music with W. H. Hunt, a local music teacher, along with Hunt's nephews, Frederic and Ernest Austin who both became composers. He was organist of Christ Church, Birkenhead, St Saviour's Church, Oxton and later at St Mary the Virgin, St Briavels, Gloucestershire. He was also a composer.

His earliest known composition was Allegro Moderato in D minor for organ, which was published by Reeves in 1889. His Symphony No 1 was performed in Liverpool by the Liverpool Orchestral Society under Bantock in 1908. It was published by Breitkopf & Härtel and republished by MPH Group. There were further performances, in Bournemouth under James Lyon (1872–1949) in February 1912, and in Manchester by the Hallé Orchestra. His Symphony No 2 appears to be lost, although it was performed in Manchester on 1 January 1928 by the Hallé Orchestra under Sir Hamilton Harty and broadcast. It was also awarded a prize by the Carnegie Music Trust. Both symphonies were reviewed in detail by Leigh Henry.

As part of the Musical League Festival, Bryson's Idylls of a Summer's Day was performed in 1909. His next big success was Voices, a study for orchestra premièred by Sir Henry Wood at the Promenade Concert, London on 15 September 1910. Next came The Stranger for Baritone, chorus & small orchestra, which was premièred by the Liverpool Philharmonic Choir and Orchestra in 1917. His part-song Drum-taps was reviewed as a new publication in 1918. His Fanfare for an Adventure was published in 1921 as a piano version.

Bryson's opera The Leper's Flute with libretto by Ian Colvin was premièred in Glasgow on 15 October 1926 by the British National Opera Company and subsequently toured to Edinburgh, Manchester, Liverpool and London. Also that year Bryson's song cycle The Unfading Garden was introduced by Hugh Campbell at the Grotriau Hall. A song cycle, A Last Harvest was played at the Reid Concert at the University of Edinburgh on 19 November 1927. The Radio Times shows that on 27 August 1937 Bryson's The Field of Boliauns was broadcast; performed by the BBC Orchestra conducted by Clarence Raybould with Parry Jones (tenor).

Bryson claimed he had been the confidant of William J. Ridley in the design of the organ at Liverpool Cathedral. Ridley was an amateur organist and an enthusiastic member of the organ committee, who was determined that the organ at Liverpool Cathedral would be the biggest and best organ in the World. Ridley was credited with the inception of the project.

Ridley left a legacy to Bryson which he used to found an organ fund to replace the little antiquated organ at St Mary the Virgin, St Briavels, Gloucestershire, where he was organist in his retirement. He is commemorated by a plaque on the organ.

Bryson was one of the founders of the Rodewald Concert Society, Liverpool and after his retirement to St Briavels in 1924, he was invited to become its President. He accepted only after Elgar had declined the honour, describing Elgar as combining "stupidity and impertinence" in his reply to the society.

== Compositions ==
Published compositions are shown in the British Library Catalogue.

After his death, Bryson’s eldest sister, Jessie Frew Bryson (1862-1954) attempted to collect his manuscripts for safe keeping. Unfortunately it is not known where she lodged them.

=== Operas ===
- Opera The Leper's Flute (Goodwin & Tab, 1925)

=== Orchestral ===
- Fantasia-Overture (1894)
- Idylls of a Summer's Day (1909)
- Symphony No 1 in D (Breitkopf & Härtel, 1909 and MPH Group undated)
- Symphony No 2 in C (1928)
- Vaila, fantasy for string orchestra (Breitkopf & Härtel, 1909)
- Voices, a study for orchestra (1910)

=== Cantatas and Oratorios ===
- The Field of Boliauns for tenor and orchestra (1937)
- The Stranger for Baritone, chorus & small orchestra (Stainer & Bell, 1917)

=== Songs ===
- A Last Harvest, a song cycle for voice and orchestra
- A song of long ago (Weekes & Co, 1890)
- Nae sae bad as it micht hae been for one or two baritones (Larway, 1927)
- So, the Year's done with (Oxford University Press, 1927)
- The Unfading Garden (1926)
- What the People Tell Old Büsen (Stainer & Bell, 1911)

=== Part Songs ===
- Drum-taps, seven part songs for chorus with side-drum (J Curwen & Sons, 1918)
- Grey, Canzonetta for female voices (Stainer & Bell, 1914)
- Simple as a Daisy for male voices (Curwen, 1930)
- Six Silly Songs for sensible children, (with Ernest Austin), (J. H. Larway, 1916)
- The Angler (J Curwen & Sons, 1925)
- The Silent Town for female voices (1914)

=== Church music ===
- Most Glorious Lord of Life, Anthem (London 1912)
- The Unison Chant Choir-Book, a collection of original chants designed to encourage congregational singing (with Arthur Wormald Pollitt, Henry Frowde 1909)

=== Chamber music ===
- Adagio cantabile, trio for violin, pianoforte and harmonium or American organ (1895?) (Donajowski, 1916)
- String Quartet No 1
- String Quartet No 2

=== Organ ===
- Allegro Deciso in D (1895)
- Allegro Grazioso (Schott, 1922)
- Allegro Moderato in D min (Reeves) 1889)
- Fantasia-Overture in D (Donajowski, 1894)
- Introduction & Symphonic Finale (Larway, 1910)
- Invocation (Mayhew)
- Pæan (J. Williams}, 1940)
- Prelude & Fugue in D (Donajowski, 1893)
- Processional Fantasia in C (Donajowski, 1893)
- P†n for organ [sic] (1940)
- Rhapsody (J. Williams}, 1935)
- Sequence of 7 Miniatures (Schott, 1922) IMSLP
- Six Church Preludes (Novello, 1892)
- Six Pieces Op. 26 (Donajowski, 1895)
- Sonata in C min (Forsyth)
- Two Miniatures (Schott & Co. 1922)

=== Piano ===
- Through the Little Meadows Dedicated to and first performed by Frederick Brandon
- Fanfare for an Adventure arr. for piano (1921),
- Remembrance, A melody for pianoforte (J. H. Larway), 1926)

== Sources ==
1. Bryson, (Robert) Ernest, Grove Dictionary of Music and Musicians, 1954 and earlier editions (Grove)
2. A Dictionary of Modern Music and Musicians, Ed. Eaglefield-Hull, Dent 1924 (Dent)
3. Bryson, Ernest British Library catalogues
4. Ernest Bryson Scottish Composers
5. Biographical Dictionary of the Organ (Requires a subscription for composer details)
6. Bryson, Ernest IMSLP
7. Rodewald Concert Society archives
8. Ancestry
