= Sahara Love =

1926 film

- Directed by: Sinclair Hill
- Written by: A.L. Vincent (novel); Geoffrey H. Malins
- Starring: Marie Colette; Jean Dehelly; Sybil Rhoda; Edward O'Neill
- Production companies: Stoll Pictures; Espanola
- Distributed by: Stoll Pictures
- Release date: March 1926
- Running time: 7,000 feet
- Countries: Spain; United Kingdom
- Languages: Silent; English intertitles

Sahara Love is a 1926 British-Spanish silent drama film directed by Sinclair Hill and starring Marie Colette, Jean Dehelly and Sybil Rhoda. It was based on a novel by A.L. Vincent. The production company held a competition, the winner of which was given a leading role in the film.

== Synopsis ==
Eleanor Vallance turns down Hugh Trevor for another man. After travelling with her new husband to Algiers she discovers he is a violent bully.

== Cast ==
- Marie Colette as Eleanor Vallance
- Jean Dehelly as Hugh Trevor
- Sybil Rhoda as Melody Rourke
- Edward O'Neill as Sir Max Drake
- Gordon Hopkirk as Sheik

== Bibliography ==
- Bell, Melanie & Williams, Melanie. British Women's Cinema. Routledge, 2010.
- Low, Rachel. The History of British Film: Volume IV, 1918–1929. Routledge, 1997.
