= The Hound of the Deep =

1926 film

- Directed by: Frank Hurley
- Written by: Frank Hurley
- Produced by: Frank Hurley
- Starring: Eric Bransby Williams; Lillian Douglas; Jameson Thomas
- Cinematography: Frank Hurley; Walter Sully
- Production company: Stoll Pictures
- Distributed by: J.C. Williamson Films
- Release dates: 6 November 1926 (Aus); February 1927 (UK)
- Running time: 4,960 feet
- Countries: Australia; United Kingdom
- Language: Silent
- Budget: £5,000

The Hound of the Deep is a 1926 British–Australian silent drama film directed by Frank Hurley and starring Eric Bransby Williams, Lilian Douglas and Jameson Thomas. Unlike many Australian silent films, a copy of it survives today.

It was one of the first Australian films set on Thursday Island.

== Plot ==
Under the terms of his uncle's will, John Strong must go to Thursday Island and find a pearl within two years or the Reuben Strong pearling station and his great wealth will revert to another, Black Darley. Eventually Strong finds the pearl, defeats Darley and discovers romance with the daughter of an island trader.

== Cast ==
- Eric Bransby Williams as John Strong
- Lilian Douglas as Marjorie Jones
- Jameson Thomas as 'Black' Darley
- W. G. Saunders as 'Cockeye' Jones
- Molly Johnson as Lady Cynthia
- Dallas Cairns as Mr. Bullyer

== Production ==
After the disappointing reception to his documentaries in America, Hurley decided to go into dramatic feature films. He succeed in persuading the Australian-born British theatre magnate Sir Oswald Stoll to provide £10,000 and several actors and technicians to make two films in Papua and Thursday Island, this and Jungle Woman.

Hurley and his crew left Sydney in August 1925 and travelled to Thursday Island where they shot The Hound of the Deep.

== Release ==
Reviews generally praised the photography but had reservations about the story.

The film was released in Britain as Pearl of the South Seas.

Hurley later filmed second unit for another pearling story Lovers and Luggers.
