= Lilian Douglas =

British actress

- Occupation: Actress
- Years active: 1922–1926 (film)

Lilian Douglas was a British stage and film actress. She starred in fourteen films during the silent era.

== Career ==
Douglas made her film debut in When Greek Meets Greek (1922) directed by Walter West and starring Violet Hopson and Stewart Rome. Her most prominent role was Eileen Adair, the elder sister of the title character played by Mae Marsh, in the Graham-Wilcox production Paddy the Next Best Thing (1923), directed by Graham Cutts. The film is presumed lost. Her last major screen role was Marjorie Jones in Frank Hurley's The Hound of the Deep (1926),shot on Thursday Island and released in Britain as Pearl of the South Seas.

== Selected filmography ==
- When Greek Meets Greek (1922)
- A Master of Craft (1922)
- A Sporting Double (1922)
- The Sporting Instinct (1922)
- Paddy the Next Best Thing (1923)
- The Hypocrites (1923)
- In the Blood (1923)
- The Hound of the Deep (1926)

== Bibliography ==
- Low, Rachael. The History of the British Film 1918-1929. George Allen & Unwin, 1971.
