= Ian Colvin =

British journalist and historian (1877–1938)

- Born: 29 September 1877
- Died: 10 May 1938 (aged 60)
- Other names: I.C. Rip Van Winkle
- Education: University of Edinburgh
- Occupations: Journalist and historian

Ian Duncan Colvin (29 September 1877 – 10 May 1938) was a British journalist and historian. Colvin worked in India for the Allahabad Pioneer, in South Africa for the Cape Times, and United Kingdom for The Morning Post, where he was the paperleader-writer. He wrote two volumes on the history of South Africa, "South Africa" and "The Cape of Adventure". He released satirical collections Aesop in Politics, Party Whips: by a Tory (1912) and Intercepted Letters (1913). In 1915, he published the book The Germans in England, 1066–1598, which was followed by The Unseen Hand in English History (1917). Next was a volume of adaptations from Chinese poetry After the Chinese (1927), the libretto of an opera. The Leper's Flute (1926), and a biography of General Reginald Dyer (1929). Colvin also completed the three volumes on the life of the Irish Unionist leader Sir Edward Carson started by Edward Marjoribanks.

== Early life and education ==
Colvin was born of Scottish descent. He was educated at Inverness College and the University of Edinburgh.

== Career ==
Moving about the British Empire, he worked first on the staff of the Allahabad Pioneer (1900–03). In voyage on the steamship Umona to his next position with the Cape Times, Colvin was shipwrecked on an atoll of the Maldives. He joined a small group in a lifeboat which after nine days reached Colombo. He then proceeded to Cape Town (1903–07), where he wrote on the political and cultural scene in those formative years of the Union of South Africa. His research into the history of South Africa led to two volumes "South Africa" and "The Cape of Adventure". In 1907, Colvin returned to the United Kingdom where he joined The Morning Post.

Between 1909 and 1937, he was the paper's leader-writer and wrote also under the pseudonym Rip Van Winkle, earning himself the title of "keeper of the Tory conscience". During this time, he also wrote a series of amusing rhymed fables, several based on Aesop but reworked to fit contemporary politics. Originally published under the initials I.C., they were collected in 1914 and published under his own name with the title Aesop in Politics. Earlier collections of his satirical verses were Party Whips: by a Tory (1912) and Intercepted Letters (1913). In 1915, he published The Germans in England, 1066–1598, in which he claimed the Hanseatic League had tried to control Europe through a mixture of peaceful and violent means. He followed this with The unseen hand in English history (1917), which was designed "to show, by examining a segment of our history, from the reign of Elizabeth to the end of the eighteenth century, that England is most happy when the national interest and the government work together, and least happy when our government is controlled by the unseen hand of the foreigner". A departure from the polemical, political world was his slim volume of adaptations from Chinese poetry After the Chinese (1927). Colvin called again on his knowledge of the legends of the Cape to write the libretto of an opera. The Leper's Flute (1926), the music for which was composed by Robert Ernest Bryson.

In 1929, he published his biography of General Reginald Dyer. He also completed the three volumes on the life of the Irish Unionist leader Sir Edward Carson, the first volume being the work of Edward Marjoribanks.

== Personal life ==
Colvin married Sophie Robson of Edinburgh, settling in London, first in Hampstead, later Wimbledon. They had three sons, Duncan, George (to become Commander of HMS Tigris), and Ian Goodhope (to become also journalist and author) and one daughter, Anne.
