= Matheson Lang =

Canadian actor (1879–1948)

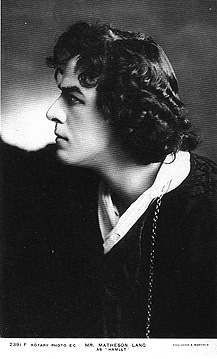
Lang as Hamlet

Matheson Alexander Lang (May 15, 1879 – April 11, 1948) was a Canadian-born stage and film actor and playwright. He is best remembered for his theatrical performances in Great Britain in Shakespeare plays.

== Biography ==
Lang was born in Montreal, Quebec, Canada, the son of Rev. Gavin Lang of Inverness, Scotland, and a cousin of Cosmo Gordon Lang, who would later become Archbishop of Canterbury.

Lang was educated at Inverness College and the University of St Andrews. He made his stage debut in 1897. He became known for his Shakespearean roles in such plays as Hamlet, Macbeth, and Romeo and Juliet. He also appeared in plays by Henrik Ibsen and George Bernard Shaw. He performed in the theatrical companies of Sir Frank Benson, Lillie Langtry, and Ellen Terry.

In 1903 he married actress Nelly Hutin Britton in London. In 1906 he played Tristram in Joseph Comyns Carr's play Tristram and Iseult at the Adelphi Theatre, with Lily Brayton as Iseult and Oscar Asche as King Mark; Lang's wife played Arganthael. Asche afterwards usually referred to Lang as "Tristram".

Lang and his wife subsequently formed their own company, which toured India, South Africa, and Australia from 1910 to 1913 performing Shakespeare. In 1913, Lang returned to England and created one of his most memorable roles, the title character in Mr. Wu. He reprised this part in a 1919 silent film, and became so identified with the role that he titled his 1940 memoirs Mr. Wu Looks Back. In 1914, he and Britton successfully produced The Taming of the Shrew, The Merchant of Venice, and Hamlet at the Old Vic.

In 1916, Lang became one of the first major theatre stars to act on film, as Shylock in The Merchant of Venice, with his wife as Portia. He went on to appear in over 30 films and was one of Britain's leading movie stars of the 1920s. Among his memorable roles were Guy Fawkes (1923), Matthias in The Wandering Jew (1923) (which also featured his wife as Judith), Henry IV in Henry, King of Navarre (1924), and Henry V in Royal Cavalcade (1935).

Lang also wrote the plays Carnival (1919) and The Purple Mask (1920), both of which were produced on Broadway and made into films. The film The Chinese Bungalow (1940 film), was adapted from his play of the same name, in which he had, in his turn, played the lead of Yuan Sing, in the first film adaptation, in 1926, and again, in 1930.

In 1940 the Langs were staying with their old friend Dornford Yates and his wife at their house near Pau in France when France surrendered. The Langs had to escape from the advancing Germans through Spain to Portugal.

Matheson Lang died in Bridgetown, Barbados, at age 68.

== Selection of Lang's stage performances ==
- Tristram and Iseult as Tristram (Adelphi Theatre, 1906)
- Pete as Pete Quilliam (1908)

== Filmography ==
- The Merchant of Venice (1916) as Shylock (film debut)
- The Ware Case (1917) as Sir Hubert Ware
- The House Opposite (1917) as Henry Rivers MP
- Masks and Faces (1917) as Coachman
- Everybody's Business (1917) as Lieutenant Jack Goudron
- Victory and Peace (1918) as Edward Arkwright
- Mr. Wu (1919) as Mr. Wu
- Carnival (1921) as Sylvio Steno
- A Romance of Old Baghdad (1922) as Prince Omar
- Dick Turpin's Ride to York (1922) as Dick Turpin
- Jealousy (1923) as Jan Steen
- The Wandering Jew (1923) as Mattathias
- Guy Fawkes (1923) as Guy Fawkes
- Henry, King of Navarre (1924) as Henry of Navarre
- Slaves of Destiny (1924) as Luke Charnock
- White Slippers (1924) as Lionel Hazard
- Port of Lost Souls (1924)
- The Secret Kingdom (1925) as John Quarrain
- The Qualified Adventurer (1925) as Peter Duff
- The Chinese Bungalow (1926) as Yuan Sing
- The Island of Despair (1926) as Stephen Rhodes
- The King's Highway (1927) as Paul Clifford
- The Blue Peter (1928) as David Hunter
- The Triumph of the Scarlet Pimpernel (1928) as Sir Percy Blakeney
- The Chinese Bungalow (1930) as Yuan Sing
- Carnival (1931) as Sylvio Steno
- Channel Crossing (1933) as Jacob Van Eeden
- The Great Defender (1934) as Sir Douglas Rolls
- Little Friend (1934) as John Hughes
- Royal Cavalcade (1935) as Henry V
- Drake of England (1935) as Sir Francis Drake
- The Cardinal (1936) as Cardinal de Medici (final film)
