= Symphony No. 2 (Bax) =

Symphony by Arnold Bax

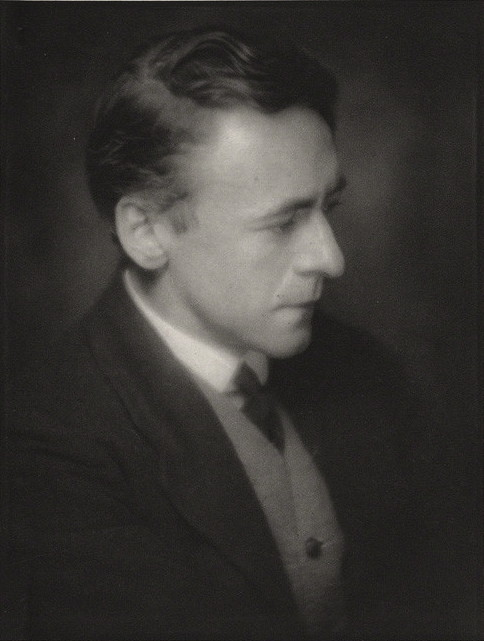
Arnold Bax in 1922

The Symphony No. 2 in E minor and C major by Arnold Bax was completed in 1926, after he had worked on it for two years. It was dedicated to Serge Koussevitzky, who conducted the first two performances of the work on 13 and 14 December 1929.

== Music ==
It is scored for piccolo, three flutes, two oboes, English horn, three clarinets, bass clarinet, two bassoons, double bassoon, four horns, three trumpets, two tenor trombones, bass trombone, euphonium, bass tuba, percussion (timpani, bass drum, tambourine, cymbals, xylophone, and glockenspiel), celesta, piano, two harps, organ and strings.

It is in three movements:

1. Molto moderato – Allegro moderato
2. Andante
3. Poco largamente – Allegro feroce – Molto largamente

The opening movement is noted for its complex orchestration. The orchestra is unusually large for Bax, with the organ used solely for pedals to add a dark effect. The thematic material for the entire symphony is laid out in the Molto moderato introduction of the first movement. The Allegro moderato section which follows is a further development of the introductory material, as is the more lyrical second subject. The movement ends with the sonorous theme which was first stated by the lower woodwinds at the beginning of the symphony. A typical performance of this movement lasts 16 minutes. The second movement begins with an ostinato on harp and the flutes, which eventually develops into a beautiful melody that forms a basis for the development of the movement. A quotation of Bax's tone poem In Memoriam is used, and motifs are quoted from the opening movement of the symphony. A typical performance of this movement lasts 12 minutes.

The final movement continues to use the main thematic material, with a short Poco largamente introduction followed by a fast, furious Allegro feroce section. A direct quotation from the first movement is used, the main climax of the piece is reached just before the epilogue in which the symphony fades into unresolved tranquility. A typical performance of this movement lasts 11 minutes.

== Score ==
=== I. Molto moderato – Allegro moderato ===
The first movement opens nearly in silence, as if the sound is emerging from the morning fog. After some initial rumblings we are presented the main theme by the woodwinds:

Further presentation of this theme with embellishment continues and pace picks up and we are then presented a 2nd theme this time by the clarinets:

This theme with some variability continues to be presented by various groups of instruments, and we then proceed toward the end of the movement, where the pace softens to present this line from the string:

=== II. Andante ===
The main theme in the 2nd movement is presented by the strings:

Its theme is developed further before the musical texture changes abruptly. A woodwind melody, initially presented by the oboe and flute subsequently by the cor anglais is accompanied by the tremolo strings, harps and celesta. the following excerpt presents this expand section:

=== III. Poco largamente – Allegro feroce – Molto largamente ===
The third movement begins ominously with tremolo strings and a brass fanfare:

== Notable recordings ==
- Myer Fredman conducting the London Philharmonic Orchestra
- David Lloyd-Jones conducting the Royal Scottish National Orchestra
- Vernon Handley conducting the BBC Philharmonic
