= The Wonderful Story (1932 film) =

1932 film

- Eric Bransby Williams, John Batten and Wyn Clare in the film
- Directed by: Reginald Fogwell
- Written by: Reginald Fogwell
- Based on: The Wonderful Story by I.A.R. Wylie
- Produced by: Reginald Fogwell
- Starring: Eric Bransby Williams; Wyn Clare; John Batten
- Cinematography: Henry Harris
- Production company: Reginald Fogwell Productions
- Distributed by: Sterling Film Company
- Release date: 20 October 1932
- Running time: 72 minutes
- Country: United Kingdom
- Language: English

The Wonderful Story is a 1932 British drama film directed by Reginald Fogwell and starring Eric Bransby Williams, Wyn Clare and John Batten. It was written by Fogwell based on the 1921 short story of the same title by I.A.R. Wylie, which had previously been turned into the 1922 silent film The Wonderful Story. The film was a quota quickie, largely shot on location in Devon.

== Preservation status ==
The British Film Institute National Archive holds no stills or ephemera, and no film or video materials.

== Premise ==
Bob Martin is a hard-headed farmer. On the eve of his wedding to Mary Richards, he suffers an accident and is left with his legs paralysed. While Mary and his younger brother John care for him, he sees the pair are falling in love. His anger is such that he cannot speak to them, until the day Mary gives birth to their child, and as he holds the baby in his arms, the love he feels replaces his hatred.

== Cast ==
- Eric Bransby Williams as Bob Martin
- Wyn Clare as Mary Richards
- John Batten as John Martin
- Moore Marriott as Zacky Richards
- J. Fisher White as Parson
- Sam Livesey as doctor
- Ernest Lester as Amos

== Reception ==
Film Weekly wrote: "Rustic drama, developed in lovely Devonian and Cornish settings. These natural backgrounds do much to relieve sombre story, involving a lot of heavy sentiment. Fair entertainment of a thoroughly English type. ... Some rustic comedy is introduced at the gloomiest part of the plot, but it is too obviously dragged in for the sake of light relief."

Kine Weekly wrote: "Reginald Fogwell's adaptation of I. A. R. Wylie's well-known story is workmanlike and sincere, if it fails perhaps in that touch of inspiration necessary in the unfolding of what is really a psychological study. It should do very well indeed as the serious dramatic balance in a programme containing more sparkling material. One asset is the charming West Country.
