= The Chinese Bungalow (play) =

1925 Play

The Chinese Bungalow is a 1925 play by Marion Osmond and James Corbet, based on Osmond's 1923 novel; it is a three-act melodrama set in the Far East. It was adapted for film in 1926, in 1930, and again in 1940.
