= Eric Bransby Williams =

British actor (1900–1994)

Eric Bransby Williams (18 March 1900 – 22 June 1994) was a British actor.

In 1923 he toured the United Kingdom as the Priest in a production of Hamlet with his father Bransby Williams in the title role.

== Selected filmography ==
- His Grace Gives Notice (1924)
- The Sins Ye Do (1924)
- The Presumption of Stanley Hay, MP (1925)
- The Gold Cure (1925)
- Confessions (1925)
- The Secret Kingdom (1925)
- The Wonderful Wooing (1925)
- Pearl of the South Seas (1926)
- Easy Virtue (1928)
- Troublesome Wives (1928)
- The Hellcat (1928)
- Little Miss London (1929)
- When Knights Were Bold (1929)
- The Wonderful Story (1932)
