= Genevieve Townsend =

American actress (1897–1927)

- Born: December 4, 1897; Freeport, Illinois; United States
- Died: May 1, 1927 (aged 29); Switzerland
- Other names: Genevieve Schmich, Genevieve Smeek
- Occupations: Film actor stage actor
- Years active: 1925 - 1927

Genevieve Schmich (December 4, 1897 – May 1, 1927), known professionally as Genevieve Smeek and Genevieve Townsend, was an American stage and film actress. She was born in Freeport, Illinois and attended Mount Holyoke College, where she majored in English and English Literature. After graduating in 1920, she moved to Britain, where she joined Frank Benson's theatre company. During the mid-1920s she had several lead roles in British silent films. She died in Switzerland, of tuberculosis, at the age of 29 in 1927.

In 1928, Mount Holyoke College established the Genevieve Schmich Award in her honor.

== Selected filmography ==
- The Secret Kingdom (1925)
- A Girl of London (1925)
- The Qualified Adventurer (1925)
- The Chinese Bungalow (1926)

== Sources ==
Trewin, J. C. (1960). Benson and the Bensonians. London: Barrie and Rockliff.
