= Liverpool and Merseyside Record Offices =

Part of the repository of archival information for the United Kingdom

Coordinates: 53.4098°N 2.9807°W

Liverpool Record Office and Merseyside Record Office hold the archives for the city of Liverpool, and the rest of Merseyside. The archives are held at the Liverpool Central Library, and are run by Liverpool City Council.
