= The Chinese Bungalow (1926 film) =

1926 British film by Sinclair Hill

- Directed by: Sinclair Hill
- Written by: James Corbett (play); Marian Osmond (play)
- Starring: Matheson Lang; Genevieve Townsend; Juliette Compton; Shayle Gardner
- Cinematography: Jack E. Cox
- Production company: Stoll Pictures
- Distributed by: Stoll Pictures
- Release date: May 1926
- Country: United Kingdom
- Languages: Silent; English intertitles

The Chinese Bungalow is a 1926 British silent drama film directed by Sinclair Hill, and starring Matheson Lang, Genevieve Townsend and Juliette Compton. It was based on the 1925 play The Chinese Bungalow, which was adapted for further films in 1930 and 1940. It was made by Stoll Pictures, whose principal star throughout the mid-1920s was Lang.

== Cast ==
- Matheson Lang as Yuan Sing
- Genevieve Townsend as Charlotte
- Juliette Compton as Sadie
- Shayle Gardner as Richard Marquess
- George Thirlwell as Harold Marquess
- Malcolm Tod as Vivian Dale
- Clifford McLaglen as Abdal
- George Butler as Chinese Servant
- Guy Mills as Chinese Servant

== Bibliography ==
- Bamford, Kenton. Distorted Images: British National Identity and Film in the 1920s. I.B. Tauris, 1999.
