= Hyde Park Corner (disambiguation) =

Hyde Park Corner may refer to:

- Hyde Park Corner, a landmark in London, United Kingdom
  - Hyde Park Corner tube station
- Hyde Park Corner (play), a 1934 play by Walter Hackett
- Hyde Park Corner (film), a 1935 drama based on the play
- Leisurely Pedestrians, Open Topped Buses and Hansom Cabs with Trotting Horses, an 1889 film also known as Hyde Park Corner.
- A junction on the corner of the Hyde Park area in Leeds
- Hyde Park Corner (shopping centre), a shopping centre in Johannesburg, South Africa
- Hyde Park Corner (Royal Berks) Commonwealth War Graves Commission Cemetery in Belgium
- A secret code name given by the British government for the death and funeral arrangements of King George VI of the United Kingdom
- "Hyde Park Corner" (The Crown), a 2016 television episode which covers the death of King George VI
