= The Barton Mystery =

The Barton Mystery may refer to:

- The Barton Mystery (play), a play by Walter Hackett
- The Barton Mystery (1920 film), a British silent film directed by Harry T. Roberts
- The Barton Mystery (1932 film), a British film directed by Henry Edwards
- The Barton Mystery (1949 film), a French film directed by Charles Spaak
