= Jeanne Stuart =

British actress (1908–2003)

- Born: Ivy Sweet; 13 August 1908; Hampstead, London, England, UK
- Died: 12 February 2003 (aged 94); Monte Carlo, Monaco
- Occupation: Actress
- Years active: 1931–1953
- Spouse(s): Bernard Docker (1933–1935) (divorced); Baron Eugène Daniel de Rothschild (1952–1976) (his death)

Jeanne Stuart (13 August 1908 – 12 February 2003), born Ivy Sweet, was a British stage and film actress.

Using the stage name Jeanne Stuart, she performed on the London stage, on Broadway, and in motion pictures. She made her motion picture debut in 1931 and went on to perform and star in more than twenty films. Her West End stage appearances included Walter Hackett's Road House (1932), Afterwards (1933) and Espionage (1935). In 1945 she appeared in the hit musical Under the Counter alongside Cicely Courtneidge.

She was married in 1933 to businessman Bernard Docker but their union lasted only a few months. Docker's disapproving father had her followed by private detectives; on discovering her association with actor David Hutcheson, allegedly involving 'circumstances which left no doubt of their adultery', Docker divorced her.

After World War II, she moved to the United States, taking up residence on Long Island. She met Baron Eugène Daniel von Rothschild, a member of the Rothschild family and grandson of Salomon Mayer von Rothschild of the Rothschild banking family of Austria. They married in 1952, after which she gave up her acting career. For a time, she and her husband lived in New York City and Long Island but eventually made their permanent home in Monte Carlo, Monaco.

Baroness Jeanne de Rothschild died in Monte Carlo in 2003.

== Filmography ==
Year	Title	Role	Notes
1931	Creeping Shadows	Olga Hoyt	
1931	A Safe Affair	Olga Delgaroff	
1931	Mischief	Eleanor Bingham	
1932	Once Bitten	Alicia	
1932	Life Goes On	Clare Armore	
1932	White Face	Gloria Gaye	
1932	Leap Year	Angela Mallard	
1933	The Shadow	Moya Silverton	
1933	The Medicine Man	Flossie	
1934	The Great Defender	Phyllis Ware	
1934	The King of Paris	Yvonne	
1934	Bella Donna	Zoe Harwich	
1935	My Heart Is Calling	Margot	
1935	Death on the Set	Blanche	
1936	Forget Me Not	Olga Desmond	
1937	Kathleen Mavourneen	Barbara Fitzpatrick	
1938	Bank Holiday	Miss Mayfair	
1939	Old Mother Riley Joins Up	Nurse Wilson	
1939	The Mysterious Mr. Davis	Anita Goldenburg	
1948	Bonnie Prince Charlie	Elspeth Patterson	
1953	Twice Upon a Time	Mrs. Jamieson	
