= The Shadow (1933 film) =

- Directed by: George A. Cooper
- Written by: Terence Egan; H. Fowler Mear
- Based on: play The Shadow by Gerald Verner (as Donald Stuart)
- Produced by: Julius Hagen
- Starring: Henry Kendall; Elizabeth Allan; Felix Aylmer; Jeanne Stuart
- Cinematography: Sydney Blythe
- Edited by: Jack Harris
- Production company: Twickenham Film Studios
- Release date: 1933
- Running time: 74 minutes 63 minutes (US)
- Country: United Kingdom
- Language: English

The Shadow is a 1933 British mystery film directed by George A. Cooper and starring Henry Kendall, Elizabeth Allan and Felix Aylmer. It was written by Terence Egan and H. Fowler Mear based on the 1928 play The Shadow by Gerald Verner (as Donald Stuart), and was made as a quota quickie.

== Plot ==
When a detective is murdered, Scotland Yard pursue a mysterious blackmailer known as "The Shadow," tracking him down to the country house home of Chief Commissioner of Police Sir Richard Bryant. The police arrive in thick fog to find a party in progress at the house with guests including travellers stranded by the fog, crooks, family members and a crime novelist. Another murder takes place, and the police investigations lead to a surprise climax.

== Cast ==
- Henry Kendall as Reggie Ogden
- Elizabeth Allan as Sonia Bryant
- Felix Aylmer as Sir Richard Bryant
- Jeanne Stuart as Moya Silverton
- Cyril Raymond as Silverton
- Viola Compton as Mrs. Bascomb
- John Turnbull as Detective Inspector Carr
- Ralph Truman as Elliot
- Dennis Cowles as Chief Inspector Fleming
- Vincent Holman as Wallis
- James Raglan as Beverley Kent
- Gordon Begg as Willit
- Charles Carson as Sir Edward Hulme KC

== Reception ==
Kine Weekly wrote: "Mystery drama, with a strong comedy element, which has the merit of concealing the identity of the central character until the end, thereby keeping the entertainment maintained at an even level. The action is a trifle leisurely, but the abundant humour, eminently popular in character, is deftly employed to prevent monotony and give contrast."

The Daily Film Renter wrote: "Mystery thriller in which elusive criminal defies Scotland Yard. Ingenious story with identity of the Shadow well concealed until end, and surprise development. Adequate comedy touches in film that has been marred, however, by lengthy and pointless speeches that retard action. On the whole should please average audiences."

Picture Show wrote: "Tense and amusing in turns."
