= Road House (1934 film) =

1934 British comedy crime film

- Opening titles
- Directed by: Maurice Elvey
- Written by: Leslie Arliss; Austin Melford
- Based on: Road House by Walter Hackett
- Produced by: Michael Balcon; Jerome Jackson
- Starring: Violet Loraine; Gordon Harker; Aileen Marson; Emlyn Williams
- Cinematography: Leslie Rowson
- Edited by: Paul Capon
- Music by: Bretton Byrd and Harry Woods
- Production company: Gaumont British
- Distributed by: Gaumont British Distributors
- Release date: 29 November 1934
- Running time: 76 minutes
- Country: United Kingdom
- Language: English

Road House is a 1934 British comedy crime film directed by Maurice Elvey and starring Violet Loraine, Gordon Harker and Aileen Marson. It was written by Leslie Arliss and Austin Melford, based on the 1932 play Road House by Walter Hackett.

== Cast ==
- Violet Loraine as Belle Larrimore
- Gordon Harker as Sam Pritchard
- Aileen Marson as Kitty Hamble
- Emlyn Williams as Chester
- Hartley Power as Dick D'Arcy
- Anne Grey as Lady Chettwinde
- Stanley Holloway as Donovan
- Marie Lohr as Lady Hamble
- Edwin Styles as Archie Hamble
- Romilly Lunge as Hugh Romilly
- Geraldo as orchestra leader
- Wylie Watson as magician
- Frank Atkinson as magician
- George Zucco as hotel manager
- Anthony Holles as receptionist at Hotel Splendide
- Andreas Malandrinos as Head Waiter
- C. Denier Warren as music hall MC
- D.J. Williams as Stage Manager
- Harry Terry as Sailor

== Production ==
The film was made by British Gaumont at the Lime Grove Studios in Shepherd's Bush, with shooting beginning in July 1934. The film's art direction was by Alfred Junge. British Gaumont's contract director Alfred Hitchcock was originally reported to be making the film, but instead directed The Man Who Knew Too Much (1934).

The song "What a Little Moonlight Can Do", written by Harry Woods, is sung in the film by Violet Lorraine.

== Reception ==
Picture Show wrote: "A romantic comedy in which a barmaid rises to become a variety star. Violet Loraine as Belle Tout, the barmaid, gives an excellent performance singing some of her old-time songs, and is strongly supported by Gordon Harker as Sam, who is as usual most entertaining with his own particular brand of Cockney humour. Hartley Power, Emlyn Williams and Anne Grey make a convincing bunch of crooks, and a word of praise must go to Stanley Holloway's amusing policeman. Good entertainment."

Variety wrote: "Very little more than the name of Walter Hackett's play has been left in the screen version. It was a wise thing to make such a drastic adaptation, because the original play was a trifle above the heads of most picture goers. Then, again, it was necessary to add legitimate excuses for Violet Loraine to sing songs, for which she was famous in pre-war and wartime musical shows at the Hippodrome and Alhambra. Gordon Harker is co-starred and has the role he originated in the stage play.. .. Filmization is straight melodrama, containing equally direct and appealing heart interest, plus Harker's compelling cockney humor. ... No reason for this film failing to entertain audiences on both sides of the pond."

== Bibliography ==
- Goble, Alan. The Complete Index to Literary Sources in Film. Walter de Gruyter, 1999.
- Ryall, Tom. Alfred Hitchcock and the British Cinema. Athlone Press, 1996.
- Wood, Linda. British Films 1927-1939. BFI, 1986.
