= Take a Chance (1937 film) =

1937 British comedy sports film

- Trade ad
- Directed by: Sinclair Hill
- Written by: G.H. Moresby-White; D. B. Wyndham-Lewis
- Based on: Take a Chance by Walter Hackett
- Produced by: Harcourt Templeman
- Starring: Claude Hulbert; Binnie Hale; Henry Kendall; Enid Stamp-Taylor
- Cinematography: John W. Boyle
- Edited by: Michael Hankinson
- Music by: John Reynders
- Production company: Grosvenor Films
- Distributed by: Associated British Film Distributors
- Release date: 14 January 1937
- Running time: 73 minutes
- Country: United Kingdom
- Language: English

Take a Chance is a 1937 British comedy sports film directed by Sinclair Hill and starring Claude Hulbert, Binnie Hale and Henry Kendall. It was written by G.H. Moresby-White and D. B. Wyndham-Lewis based on the 1931 play of the same title by Walter Hackett. The film was reissued in 1945.

== Synopsis ==
The cynical Richard Carfax develops a relationship with Cicely Burton, the wife of a race horse owner, in order to get inside information on a horse named 'Take a Chance' which is considered to be the favorite in an upcoming race. Her suspicious husband hires Alastair Pallivant, an incompetent tipster and part-time detective, to tail her and swears that he will scratch the horse from the race if he uncovers evidence about Carfax and his wife. Having his own private arrangement with a betting gang, Pallivant does everything he can to prevent the favourite from running. However, he encounters the equally determined Wilhelmina Ryde, a garage owner who stands to win heavily if the favorite rides to victory.

== Main cast ==
- Claude Hulbert as Alastair Pallivant
- Binnie Hale as Wilhelmina Ryde
- Henry Kendall as Archie Burton
- Enid Stamp-Taylor as Cicely Burton
- Gwen Farrar as Lady Meriton
- Jack Barty as Joe Cooper
- Harry Tate as Sergeant Tugday
- Guy Middleton as Richard Carfax
- Kynaston Reeves as Blinkers Grayson

== Production ==
The film was made at Ealing Studios by the independent production company Grosvenor Films, with sets were designed by the art director Aubrey Hammond.

== Reception ==
Kine Weekly wrote: "The plot contains a number of good twists, but neither the stars not the director take tull advantage of the laughter-making. Here and there the film amuses and the culminating race scene is both thrilling and exhilarating but as a whole the entertainment is anything but a riot."

The Daily Film Renter wrote: "Put over on broad lines, with abundance of farcical content, action is climaxed with fairly exciting race sequence, and affords Claude Hulbert opportunities for familiar fooling, Harry Tate abetting as musical-comedy policeman. Agreeably staged, acceptable offering for masses."

== See also ==
- List of films about horses
- List of films about horse racing
