= Other Men's Wives (play) =

Play by Walter Hackett

- Leslie Banks and Fay Compton.
- Written by: Walter Hackett
- Original language: English
- Genre: Comedy

Premiere
- Date premiered: 2 April 1928
- Place premiered: Theatre Royal, Brighton

Other Men's Wives is a 1928 comedy play by the British-American writer Walter Hackett set in a French hotel.

After premiering at the Theatre Royal in Brighton it transferred to the West End where it ran for 143 performances between 9 April and 11 August 1928, initially at Wyndham's Theatre before moving to the St Martin's Theatre. The original London cast included Fay Compton, Leslie Banks, Dino Galvani, Bruce Belfrage and Marion Lorne. The following year it appeared at the Times Square Theatre on Broadway, running for twenty three performances.

== Adaptation ==
In 1930 it was made into the American film Sweethearts and Wives by First National Pictures, directed by Clarence Badger and starring Clive Brook and Billie Dove.

== Bibliography ==
- Goble, Alan. The Complete Index to Literary Sources in Film. Walter de Gruyter, 1999.
- Wearing, J.P. The London Stage 1920-1929: A Calendar of Productions, Performers, and Personnel. Rowman & Littlefield, 2014.
