= Hyde Park Corner (play) =

Stageplay by Walter Hackett

Hyde Park Corner is a play by Walter Hackett. It premiered at the Apollo Theatre in London's West End on 5 October 1934, where it ran until 11 April 1935. The play starred Hackett's wife, the actress Marion Lorne, as The Hon. Mrs. Sophia Wittering; an 18th-century society lady with a proclivity for cheating while gambling. Others in the cast included Godfrey Tearle as both Captain Richard Concannon and Sir Richard Carstairs, K.C.; J. H. Roberts as Benson; and Gordon Harker as Police Constable Samuel Cheatle. The play featured a time jump, with part of the play taking place in the 1780s and part of the play taking place the year the 1934.

Harker reprised his role from the stage play in the 1935 film adaption of the work which was directed by Sinclair Hill.
