= Marion Lorne =

American actress (1883–1968)

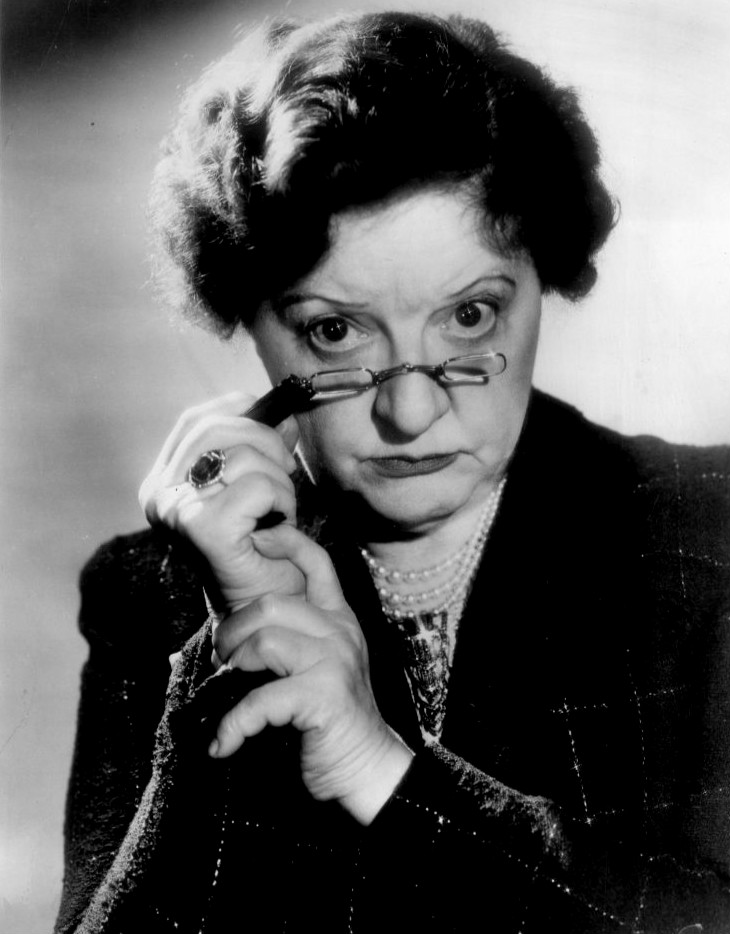
- Lorne in 1957
- Born: Marion Lorne MacDougal or MacDougall; August 12, 1883; West Pittston, Pennsylvania, U.S.
- Died: May 9, 1968 (aged 84); Manhattan, New York, U.S.
- Resting place: Ferncliff Cemetery, Hartsdale, New York; 41°01′39″N 73°49′57″W
- Occupation: Actress
- Years active: 1905–1968
- Spouse: Walter Hackett (m. 1911; died 1944)

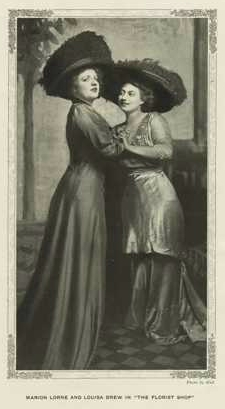
Lorne with Louise Drew in the play The Florist Shop (1909)

Marion Lorne MacDougal or MacDougall (August 12, 1883 – May 9, 1968), known professionally as Marion Lorne, was an American actress on stage, film, and television. After a career in theatre in New York and London, Lorne made her first film in 1951, and for the remainder of her life played small roles in films and television. Her recurring role as Aunt Clara in the comedy series Bewitched, between 1964 and her death in 1968, brought her widespread recognition, and she was posthumously awarded an Emmy Award for Outstanding Supporting Actress in a Comedy Series.

== Early life and education ==
Lorne was born in West Pittston, Pennsylvania, a small mining town halfway between Wilkes-Barre and Scranton. She was the daughter of William Lorne MacDougall, MD, and his wife, Jane Louise (née Oliver), known as "Jennie". She was born in 1883 (although by the 1920s, she had shaved five years off her age). While her year of birth is listed as 1885 in some sources, including the date inscribed on her urn (which appears to be erroneous), it was usually listed as 1888 when she was alive. The 1900 United States census (enumerated in June 1900) gives her age as 16, and along with the Social Security Death Index (SSDI), lists her year of birth as 1883. Her parents were Scottish and English immigrants. She had a younger brother, Lorne Taylor MacDougall. She studied at the American Academy of Dramatic Arts in New York City.

== Career ==
Lorne debuted on Broadway in 1905; she also acted in London theaters, enjoying a flourishing stage career on both sides of the Atlantic Ocean. In London, she had her theater, the Whitehall, where she had top billing in plays written by Walter Hackett, her husband. None of her productions at the Whitehall had runs shorter than 125 nights.

After appearing in a few Vitaphone shorts, including Success (1931) starring Jack Haley, she made her feature-film debut in her late 60s in Strangers on a Train (1951), directed by Alfred Hitchcock.

In the early days of TV, from 1952 until 1955 Lorne had a regular role as perpetually confused junior high school English teacher Mrs. Gurney on Mister Peepers.

From 1957 to 1958, she co-starred with Joan Caulfield in the NBC sitcom Sally in the role of an elderly widow who happens to be the co-owner of a department store. It was cancelled after one 26-episode season. Although afraid of live television, declaring, "I'm a coward when it comes to a live [television] show", she was persuaded to appear a few times to promote the film The Girl Rush with Rosalind Russell in the mid-1950s. Between 1958 and 1964, she made regular appearances on The Garry Moore Show (1958–1962).

Her last role, as Aunt Clara in Bewitched, brought Lorne her widest fame as a lovable witch who is losing her powers due to old age (and whose spells usually end in disaster). Aunt Clara usually visited by coming down the chimney; her hobby was collecting doorknobs, and she often brought her collection with her on visits. Lorne had an extensive collection of doorknobs in real life, some of which she used as props in the series.

She was also a spokesperson in commercials for Oxydol detergent.

== Death ==
Lorne appeared in 27 episodes of Bewitched and was not replaced after she died of a heart attack in her Manhattan apartment on May 9, 1968, aged 84, prior to the start of production of the show's fifth season. She is interred at Ferncliff Cemetery in Greenburgh, New York.

=== Posthumous ===
The producers of Bewitched decided that Lorne's character as Aunt Clara could not be replaced by another actress. (Aunt Clara was never mentioned in any subsequent Bewitched episode after her death.) Comedic actress Alice Ghostley was recruited to fill the gap as "Esmeralda", a different type of older witch with wobbly magic whose spells often went astray. Coincidentally, Lorne and Ghostley had appeared side by side in one scene as partygoers in the classic comedy-drama film The Graduate, made the year before Lorne's death.

Lorne received a posthumous Emmy Award for Outstanding Supporting Actress in a Comedy Series for her work on Bewitched. The award was accepted by Bewitched star Elizabeth Montgomery.

In 2025, Lorne was posthumously inducted into the Luzerne County Arts & Entertainment Hall of Fame.

== Personal life ==
In 1911, Lorne married playwright Walter Hackett. They were married until his death in 1944. The couple had no children.

== Filmography ==
Year	Title	Genre	Role	Notes
1931	Success	Short film	Molly's mother	Uncredited
1951	Strangers on a Train	psychological thriller	Mrs. Anthony	
1952-1955	Mister Peepers	sitcom	Mrs. Gurney	television
1955	The Girl Rush	musical comedy	Aunt Clara	
1955	The Ed Sullivan Show	variety	Herself in "The Girl Rush Show"	
1955	Perry Como's Kraft Music Hall	variety	Herself	
1956–57	The Steve Allen Show	variety	Herself	
1957–58	Sally	sitcom	Myrtle Banford	television, 26 episodes
1958	Suspicion	mystery drama	Mrs. Foster	television, one episode
1958	DuPont Show of the Month	anthology series	Veta Louise Simmons	television, episode (television adaptation of the comedy play Harvey (1944))
1958–1964	The Garry Moore Show	variety show	herself	television
1959 (November 25, 1959)	I've Got a Secret	game show	herself	television
1964–1968	Bewitched	sitcom	Aunt Clara	television, 28 episodes, (final appearance)
1967	The Graduate	comedy drama	Miss DeWitte	

== Theatre work ==
- Dance Me a Song as Grandmother (January 20, 1950 – February 18, 1950)
- Harvey as Veta Louise Simmons (November 1, 1944 – January 15, 1949)
- Off With The Motley (1937–1938) [Whitehall Theatre, London]
- London After Dark (1937) [Streatham Hill Theatre]
- London After Dark (1937) [Apollo Theatre, London]
- The Fugitives (1936) [Whitehall Theatre, London]
- Espionage (1935–1936) [Apollo Theatre, London]
- Afterwards (1933) [Whitehall Theatre, London]
- The White Sisters (1933) [Whitehall Theatre, London]
- The Gay Adventure (1932) [Whitehall Theatre, London]
- Road House (1932) [Whitehall Theatre, London]
- Take a Chance (1931) [Whitehall Theatre, London]
- Captain Applejack (1931) [Whitehall Theatre, London]
- Good Losers (1931) [Whitehall Theatre, London]
- It Pays to Advertise (1930–1931)
- Hyde Park Corner (1930)
- The Freedom of the Seas (1929)
- Sorry You've Been Troubled (1929)
- Regeneration (1928)
- Other Men's Wives (1928)
- The Wicked Earl (1928) [His Majesty's Theater, London]
- The Barton Mystery (1927)
- 77 Park Lane (1927)
- 77 Rue Chalgrin (1925)
- Ambrose Applejohn's Adventure (1921–1923) [Criterion Theatre, London]
- Mr. Todd's Experiment (1920)
- The Barton Mystery (October 13–30, 1917; 20 performances)
- It Pays to Advertise (1915–1916)
- Don't Weaken (January 1914)
- The Little Minister as Lady Babbie (June 22, 1910 - 1910) [Hunter-Bradford Players at the Parsons Theater]
- The Florist Shop as Angelica Perkins (August 9, 1909 - September 1909)
- The Devil as Mimi (August 18, 1908 - November 1908)
- Here Tonight (1908)
- Mrs. Temple's Telegram (February 1, 1905 - March 27, 1905)

== Awards and nominations ==
Year	Result	Award	Category	Series	Reference
1954	nominated	Primetime Emmy Awards	Outstanding Supporting Actress in a Comedy Series	Mister Peepers	
1955	nominated	Primetime Emmy Awards	Outstanding Supporting Actress in a Comedy Series	Mister Peepers	
1958	nominated	Primetime Emmy Awards	Outstanding Supporting Actress in a Comedy Series	Sally	
1967	nominated	Primetime Emmy Awards	Outstanding Supporting Actress in a Comedy Series	Bewitched	
1968	won (posthumously)	Primetime Emmy Awards	Outstanding Supporting Actress in a Comedy Series	Bewitched	

== See also ==
- List of American film actresses
- List of American television actresses
- List of Americans of English descent
- List of people from New York City
- List of people from Pennsylvania
- List of Primetime Emmy Award winners
- List of Scottish Americans
