= Sorry You've Been Troubled =

Play by Walter Hackett

- Written by: Walter Hackett
- Original language: English
- Genre: Mystery

Premiere
- Date premiered: 24 September 1929
- Place premiered: His Majesty's Theatre, London

Sorry You've Been Troubled is a mystery play by the British-American writer Walter Hackett.

It premiered at His Majesty's Theatre in London's West End where it ran for 157 performances between 24 September 1929 and 1 February 1930. The original cast included Harold Huth, Hugh Wakefield, Anthony Holles, George Woodbridge, Diana Wynyard, Joan Marion, Marion Lorne and Kathleen Kelly.

== Film adaptations ==
It has twice been adapted into films: a 1932 British film Life Goes On by Paramount British Pictures, directed by Jack Raymond and starring Elsie Randolph, Betty Stockfeld and Warwick Ward and a 1935 American film One New York Night by MGM, directed by Jack Conway and starring Franchot Tone, Una Merkel, Conrad Nagel.

== Bibliography ==
- Goble, Alan. The Complete Index to Literary Sources in Film. Walter de Gruyter, 1999.
- Wearing, J.P. The London Stage 1920-1929: A Calendar of Productions, Performers, and Personnel. Rowman & Littlefield, 2014.
