= The Gay Adventure (play) =

Play by Walter Hackett

- Original language: English
- Written by: Walter Hackett
- Genre: Comedy

Premiere
- Date: 23 December 1931
- Place: Whitehall Theatre

The Gay Adventure is a 1931 comedy play by the British-American writer Walter Hackett.

It ran for 291 performances at the Whitehall Theatre in the West End between 23 December 1931 and 3 September 1932. The original cast included Seymour Hicks, Charles Quatermaine, Eric Maturin, Nora Swinburne and Marion Lorne.

== Adaptation ==
In 1936 it was made into a film of the same title directed by Sinclair Hill and starring Yvonne Arnaud.

== Bibliography ==
- Goble, Alan. The Complete Index to Literary Sources in Film. Walter de Gruyter, 1999.
- Wearing, J.P. The London Stage 1930-1939: A Calendar of Productions, Performers, and Personnel. Rowman & Littlefield, 2014.
