= The Wicked Earl =

Play by Walter Hackett

- Original language: English
- Written by: Walter Hackett
- Genre: Comedy

Premiere
- Date: 22 February 1927
- Place: His Majesty's Theatre, London

The Wicked Earl is a 1927 comedy play by the British-American writer Walter Hackett. A British earl travels to New Mexico to find out more about his heritage.

It ran for 31 performances at His Majesty's Theatre in London's West End. The original cast included Cyril Maude, Alfred Drayton, Marion Lorne, Joyce Kennedy, Stella Arbenina, George Bellamy, O.B. Clarence and Sam Livesey.

== Bibliography ==
- Wearing, J.P. The London Stage 1920-1929: A Calendar of Productions, Performers, and Personnel. Rowman & Littlefield, 2014.
