= Espionage (play) =

1935 play written by Walter Hackett

- Written by: Walter Hackett
- Original language: English
- Genre: Thriller

Premiere
- Date premiered: 15 October 1935
- Place premiered: Apollo Theatre, London

Espionage is a 1935 play by the British-American writer Walter Hackett. It is a thriller set on the Orient Express, written as a vehicle for Hackett's wife Marion Lorne. It revolves around a plot to assassinate a munitions tycoon.

It ran for 171 performances at the Apollo Theatre in London's West End between 15 October 1935 and 14 March 1936. As well as Lorne the cast included Jeanne Stuart, Edwin Styles, Eric Maturin and Frank Cellier.

== Film adaptation ==
In 1937 the play was adapted into a film of the same title by Hollywood studio MGM, directed by Kurt Neumann and starring Edmund Lowe, Madge Evans and Paul Lukas.

== Bibliography ==
- Lachman, Marvin. The Villainous Stage: Crime Plays on Broadway and in the West End. McFarland, 2014.
- Wearing, J.P. The London Stage 1930–1939: A Calendar of Productions, Performers, and Personnel. Rowman & Littlefield, 2014.
