= Ian Hunter (actor) =

British actor (1900–1975)

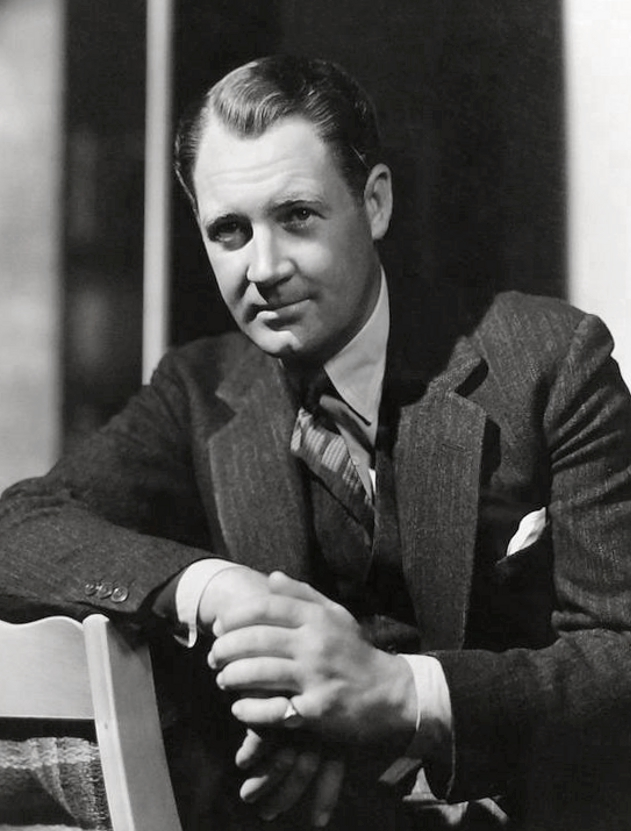
- Born: 13 June 1900; Cape Town, British Cape Colony (now South Africa)
- Died: 22 September 1975 (aged 75); London, England
- Education: Central School of Speech and Drama
- Occupation: Actor
- Years active: 1920–1963

Ian Hunter (13 June 1900 – 22 September 1975) was a South African-British actor of stage, film and television.

== Early life and education ==
Hunter was born and raised by English parents in the Kenilworth area of Cape Town, South Africa (then governed as Cape Colony). His family moved to London when he was a teenager. In 1917, he enlisted in the British Army, serving in France during the final year of the First World War.

On his return from military service, Hunter studied under Elsie Fogerty at the Central School of Speech and Drama, then based at Royal Albert Hall. Within two years he made his stage debut. He decided to work in British silent films taking a part in Not for Sale (1924) directed by W.P. Kellino for Stoll Pictures.

== Career ==
Hunter made his first trip to the United States because Basil Dean, the British actor and director, was producing Richard Brinsley Sheridan's The School for Scandal at the Knickerbocker Theater. However, the production folded after one performance. He met the director Alfred Hitchcock in 1927 and was featured in Hitchcock's The Ring (1927) and stayed for Downhill (US: When Boys Leave Home, 1927) and Easy Virtue (1928), based on the Noël Coward play. By late 1928, he returned to Broadway for only a month's run in the original comedy Olympia and stayed in America to work in Hollywood on Syncopation (1929) for RKO, his first sound film.

Hunter returned to London for Dean's thriller Escape (1930). In The Girl from 10th Avenue (1935) with Bette Davis, Hunter made his connection with Warner Bros. But before settling in with them through much of the 1930s, he did three pictures in succession with British director Michael Powell. He then appeared as the Duke in A Midsummer Night's Dream (1935) for Warner Bros. It marked the start of a string of nearly 30 films for the studio. Among the best remembered was his jovial King Richard the Lionheart in The Adventures of Robin Hood (1938). Hunter was also paired in seven movies with Kay Francis between 1935 and 1938.

Hunter appeared in The Little Princess (1939) as Captain Reginald Crewe, and was the benign guardian angel-like Cambreau in Loew's Strange Cargo (1940) with Clark Gable and Joan Crawford. He was staying regularly busy in Hollywood until into 1942 when he returned to Britain to serve in the war effort.

Hunter appeared once more on Broadway in 1948 and made Edward, My Son (1949) for MGM-British with George Cukor directing and Spencer Tracy and Deborah Kerr in the lead roles. Hunter worked once more for Michael Powell (The Queen's Guards, 1961) and then retired in the middle of that decade after nearly 100 films.

Among dozens of film roles, his best-remembered appearances include That Certain Woman (1937) with Bette Davis, Tower of London (1939, as King Edward IV), and Dr. Jekyll and Mr. Hyde (1941, as Dr. Lanyon). Hunter returned to the Robin Hood legend in the TV series The Adventures of Robin Hood from 1955 in the recurring role of Sir Richard of the Lea.

His numerous West End roles included appearances in London Life (1924), The High Road (1927), A Song of Sixpence (1930), Good Losers (1931), Can the Leopard...? (1931), Take a Chance (1931), Touch Wood (1934), Dead Secret (1952) and South Sea Bubble (1956).

== Personal life ==
Hunter married Catharine "Casha" Pringle in 1917. They had two sons, including the actor Robin Hunter (1929-2004).

=== Death ===
Hunter died in London on 22 September 1975, at the age of 75.

== Filmography ==
- Not for Sale (1924) as Martin Bering
- Confessions (1925) as Charles Oddy
- A Girl of London (1925) as Peter Horniman
- The Ring (1927) as Bob Corby
- Downhill aka When Boys Leave Home (1927) as Archie
- His House in Order (1928) as Hilary Jesson
- Easy Virtue (1928) as The Plaintiff's Counsel
- The Physician (1928) as Dr. Carey
- The Valley of Ghosts (1928) as Andrew McLeod
- The Thoroughbred (1928) as Allen Stockbridge
- Syncopation (1929) as Alexander Winston
- Escape (1930) as Detective
- Cape Forlorn aka The Love Storm (1931) as Gordon Kingsley
- Sally in Our Alley (1931) as George Miles
- The Water Gipsies (1932) as Fred Green
- The Sign of Four aka The Sign of Four: Sherlock Holmes' Greatest Case (1932) as Dr. John H. Watson
- Marry Me (1932) as Robert Hart
- The Man from Toronto (1933) as Fergus Wimbush
- The Silver Spoon (1934) as Captain Watts-Winyard
- Orders Is Orders (1934) as Capt. Harper
- The Church Mouse (1934) as Johnathan Steele
- No Escape (1934) as Jim Brandon
- Something Always Happens (1934) as Peter Middleton
- Death at Broadcasting House aka Death at a Broadcast (1934) as Detective Inspector Gregory
- Lazybones (1935) as Sir Reginald Ford
- The Girl from 10th Avenue (1935) as Geoffrey D. 'Geoff' Sherwood
- The Night of the Party aka The Murder Party (1935) as Guy Kennington
- The Phantom Light (1935) as Jim Pearce
- Jalna (1935) as Renny Whiteoaks
- The Crusades (1935) as Second Knight Pleading to King Richard for Food (uncredited)
- A Midsummer Night's Dream (1935) as Theseus - Duke of Athens
- I Found Stella Parish (1935) as Keith Lockridge
- The Morals of Marcus (1935) as Sir Marcus Ordeyne
- The White Angel (1936) as Reporter Fuller of the London Times
- To Mary - with Love (1936) as Bill Hallam
- The Devil Is a Sissy (1936) as Jay Pierce
- Stolen Holiday (1937) as Anthony Wayne
- Call It a Day (1937) as Roger Hilton
- Another Dawn (1937) as Colonel John Wister
- Confession (1937) as Leonide Kirow
- That Certain Woman (1937) as Lloyd Rogers
- 52nd Street (1937) as Rufus Rondell
- The Adventures of Robin Hood (1938) as King Richard the Lion-Heart
- Always Goodbye (1938) as Phillip Marshall
- Secrets of an Actress (1938) as Peter Snowden
- The Sisters (1938) as William Benson
- Comet Over Broadway (1938) as Bert Ballin
- Yes, My Darling Daughter (1939) as Lewis Murray
- The Little Princess (1939) as Captain Crewe
- Broadway Serenade (1939) as Larry Bryant
- Tarzan Finds a Son! (1939) as August Lancing
- Maisie (1939) as Clifford Ames
- Bad Little Angel (1939) as Jm Creighton (Sentinel editor)
- Tower of London (1939) as King Edward IV
- Broadway Melody of 1940 (1940) as Bert C. Matthews
- Strange Cargo (1940) as Cambreau
- Dulcy (1940) as Gordon Daly
- The Long Voyage Home (1940) as Smitty
- Bitter Sweet (1940) as Lord Shayne
- Gallant Sons (1940) as 'Natural' Davis
- Come Live with Me (1941) as Barton Kendrick
- Andy Hardy's Private Secretary (1941) as Steven V. Land
- Ziegfeld Girl (1941) as Geoffrey Collis
- Billy the Kid (1941) as Eric Keating
- Dr. Jekyll and Mr. Hyde (1941) as Dr. John Lanyon
- Smilin' Through (1941) as Reverend Owen Harding
- A Yank at Eton (1942) as Roger Carlton
- It Comes Up Love (1943) as Tom Peabody
- Forever and a Day (1943) as Dexter Pomfret
- Bedelia (1946) as Charlie Carrington
- White Cradle Inn aka High Fury (1947) as Anton
- The White Unicorn aka Milkwhite Unicorn and Bad Sister (1947) as Philip Templar
- Edward, My Son (1949) as Doctor Larry Woodhope
- It Started in Paradise (1952) as Arthur Turner
- Appointment in London aka Raiders in the Sky (1952) as Logan
- The Divine Creatures (1952, TV Movie) as Florent
- Don't Blame the Stork (1954) as Sir George Redway
- Eight O'Clock Walk (1954) as Geoffrey Tanner, Q.C.
- Fire One (1954, TV Movie) as Mr. Dennison
- It's Never Too Late (1954, TV Movie) as Charles Hammond
- The Battle of the River Plate aka Pursuit of the Graf Spee (1956) as Captain Charles Woodhouse - HMS Ajax
- South Sea Bubble (BBC TV 1956) as Sir George Shotter
- Fortune Is a Woman aka She Played with Fire (1957) as Clive Fisher
- Rockets Galore aka Mad Little Island (1958) as Air Commodore Watchorn
- North West Frontier (1959) as Sir John Windham
- The Bulldog Breed (1960) as Adm. Sir Bryanston Blyth
- Doctor Blood's Coffin (1961) as Dr. Robert Blood, Peter's Father
- The Treasure of Monte Cristo (1961) as Colonel Jackson
- The Queen's Guards (1961) as Mr. George Dobbie
- Guns of Darkness (1962) as Dr. Swann
- Kali Yug: Goddess of Vengeance (1963) as Robert Talbot
- The Mystery of the Indian Temple (1963) as Robert Talbot (final film role)
