= Life Goes On (1932 film) =

1932 film

- Feature on the film from Picture Show (29 October 1932)
- Directed by: Jack Raymond
- Written by: Walter Hackett
- Based on: Sorry You've Been Troubled; 1929 play by Walter Hackett
- Produced by: Herbert Wilcox
- Starring: Hugh Wakefield; Elsie Randolph; Betty Stockfeld; Warwick Ward
- Production company: British and Dominions
- Distributed by: Paramount Pictures
- Release date: March 1932
- Running time: 78 minutes
- Country: United Kingdom
- Language: English

Life Goes On (also known as Sorry You've Been Troubled) is a 1932 British crime film directed by Jack Raymond and starring Hugh Wakefield, Elsie Randolph, Betty Stockfeld and Warwick Ward. It was written by Walter Hackett based on his 1929 play Sorry You've Been Troubled, and was made at British and Dominion's Elstree Studios as a supporting feature for release by Paramount Pictures.

== Preservation status ==
The British Film Institute National Archive holds a collection of stills but no film or video materials.

== Plot summary ==
A criminal hides the body of a dead financier in an effort to manipulate shares.

== Cast ==
- Hugh Wakefield as Ridgeway Emsworth
- Elsie Randolph as Phoebe Selsey
- Betty Stockfeld as Lady Sheridan
- Warwick Ward as Ronald St.John
- Jeanne Stuart as Clare Armore
- Dennis Hoey as Anthony Carlisle
- Anthony Holles as John Collis
- Wallace Geoffrey as Robert Kent
- Robert Horton as Sir George Sheridan

== Reception ==
Kine Weekly wrote: "Fascinating performance by Hugh Wakefield and good teamwork in a neat crook play... The story is perhaps a trifle fragmentary, but the many threads have been gathered up with a commendable skill by the producer."

The Daily Film Renter wrote: "Brilliant staging and generally polished production, with notable performance by Hugh Wakefield as the explorer, and Elsie Randolph as romantic telephone operator. Interesting but thin story, rather flat denouement, plenty of humour."

== See also ==
- One New York Night (1935), also based on Sorry You've Been Troubled
