= Sweethearts and Wives =

1930 film

- Theatrical poster
- Directed by: Clarence G. Badger
- Written by: Forrest Halsey
- Based on: Other Men's Wives by Walter Hackett
- Starring: Billie Dove; Clive Brook; Sidney Blackmer; Leila Hyams
- Cinematography: John F. Seitz
- Edited by: John Rawlins
- Music by: Leonid S. Leonardi
- Production company: First National Pictures
- Distributed by: First National Pictures
- Release date: June 15, 1930 (U.S.)
- Running time: 77 minutes
- Country: United States
- Language: English

Sweethearts and Wives is a 1930 American pre-Code mystery film with comedic elements produced and released by First National Pictures and directed by Clarence G. Badger. The film stars Billie Dove, Clive Brook, Sidney Blackmer and Leila Hyams. The film was based on the 1928 West End play Other Men's Wives by Walter Hackett.

== Plot ==
Billie Dove plays the part of an aristocrat who tries to prevent her sister's divorce by attempting to recover of a diamond necklace, which is being used as incriminating evidence against her. This necklace was stolen when Dove's sister while she was secretly in another's man apartment. Dove is to meet a thief at a lonely French Inn outside of Paris who has stolen the necklace. Dove quickly disguises herself as a French maid. Unfortunately the thief is killed by someone who enters the house just as she was about to regain the diamonds. At this point, Sidney Blackmer, who has come in search of someone to fix his car and sell him some gas, arrives at the Inn. Blackmer is in an awkward position himself as he is having an affair with a married woman, played by Leila Hyams, and they are both fearful lest her husband learn of this escapade. Dove reveals that she is not a maid but an English aristocrat. The police and Clive Brook soon arrives at the house, playing the part of a divorce detective, who is secretly working to find the diamond necklace to return it to the husband of the woman who lost it. Hyams switches into Dove's maid costume in order to escape detection from Brook and the police. Meanwhile, the police are investigating the murder of the thief. Soon after the waiter and hotel clerk steal Blackmer's repaired car and take off. As the film progresses, Blackmer and Dove soon grow fond of each other and fall in love. Dove confides in Blackmer and he helps her find the necklace. In the process of recovering the necklace, three of the thieves end up being killed. In the end, Dove manages to retrieve the necklace back and save her sister from a scandalous divorce.

== Cast ==
- Billie Dove as Femme de Chambre
- Clive Brook as Reginald De Brett
- Sidney Blackmer as Anthony Peel
- Leila Hyams as Angela Worthington
- Albert Gran as Police Inspector
- Crauford Kent as Sir John Deptford
- John Loder as Sam Worthington
- Rolfe Sedan as Waiter

== Preservation ==
The film survives complete. It was transferred on to 16mm film by Associated Artists Productions in the 1957 and shown on television. A 16mm copy is housed at the Wisconsin Center for Film & Theater Research. The Library of Congress also maintains a print of the film.
