= Good Losers =

1931 British play

- Written by: Michael Arlen; Walter Hackett
- Original language: English
- Genre: Mystery

Premiere
- Date premiered: 16 February 1931
- Place premiered: Whitehall Theatre

Good Losers is a British mystery play by Michael Arlen and Walter Hackett.

It was originally performed at the Whitehall Theatre in London's West End where it ran for 134 performances between 16 February and 13 June 1931. The original cast included Ian Hunter, Francis Lister, Ronald Shiner, Anthony Holles, Eric Maturin, Joan Marion, Marion Lorne and Cathleen Nesbitt. It was followed at the theatre soon after by another Hackett's plays, the horseracing farce Take a Chance.

== Bibliography ==
- Wearing, J.P. The London Stage 1930-1939: A Calendar of Productions, Performers, and Personnel. Rowman & Littlefield, 2014.
