= Road House (play) =

1932 play by Walter C. Hackett

- Written by: Walter Hackett
- Original language: English
- Genre: Crime comedy

Premiere
- Date premiered: 6 October 1932
- Place premiered: Whitehall Theatre

Road House is a British play by Walter Hackett.

It ran for 341 performances at the Whitehall Theatre between 6 October 1932 and 5 August 1933. The original cast included Gordon Harker, Ronald Shiner, Godfrey Tearle, Marion Lorne and Jeanne Stuart, who was later replaced in her role by Sunday Wilshin.

== Film adaptation ==
In 1934 the play was adapted into a film of the same title by Gainsborough Pictures. Directed by Maurice Elvey it featured a different cast from the play, except Harker who appeared in a similar role to that he had played on stage.

== Bibliography ==
- Goble, Alan. The Complete Index to Literary Sources in Film. Walter de Gruyter, 1999.
- Wearing, J.P. The London Stage 1930–1939: A Calendar of Productions, Performers, and Personnel. Rowman & Littlefield, 2014.
