= Money Means Nothing =

Money Means Nothing may refer to:

- Money Means Nothing (1934 film), 1934 American drama film directed by Christy Cabanne
- Money Means Nothing (1932 film), 1932 British comedy film directed by Herbert Wilcox
