= One New York Night =

1935 American comedy film directed by Jack Conway

- Directed by: Jack Conway
- Screenplay by: Frank Davis
- Based on: Order, Please; 1934 play by Edward Childs Carpenter Sorry You've Been Troubled; 1929 play by Walter Hackett
- Produced by: Bernard H. Hyman
- Starring: Franchot Tone; Una Merkel; Conrad Nagel; Harvey Stephens; Steffi Duna; Charles Starrett
- Cinematography: Oliver T. Marsh
- Edited by: Tom Held
- Production company: Metro-Goldwyn-Mayer
- Distributed by: Loew's Inc.
- Release date: March 3, 1935
- Running time: 71 minutes
- Country: United States
- Language: English

One New York Night (also released as The Trunk Mystery) is a 1935 American comedy film directed by Jack Conway and written by Frank Davis. The film stars Franchot Tone, Una Merkel, Conrad Nagel, Harvey Stephens, Steffi Duna and Charles Starrett. The film was released on March 3, 1935, by Metro-Goldwyn-Mayer. It was based on the West End play Sorry You've Been Troubled by Walter Hackett, which had previously been made into the 1932 British film Life Goes On.

== Plot ==
Foxhall Ridgeway, a cattle rancher from Wyoming, checks into a New York City hotel, determined to find a wife. Instead he finds a dead body in the room next to his. Meanwhile Countess Broussiloff has asked her friend Phoebe, a switchboard operator at the hotel, to find her bracelet. She lost it in the dead man's room. Foxhall tries to get the hotel manager to call the police, only the body has disappeared. So has the bracelet. Foxhall and Phoebe team up to find the bracelet for the Countess.

== Cast ==
- Franchot Tone as Foxhall Ridgeway
- Una Merkel as Phoebe
- Conrad Nagel as Kent
- Harvey Stephens as Collis
- Steffi Duna as Countess Louise Broussiloff
- Charles Starrett as George Sheridan
- Louise Henry as Ermine
- Tom Dugan as Selby
- Harold Huber as Blake
- Henry Kolker as Arthur Carlisle

== Reception ==
Writing for The Spectator, Graham Greene praised the film as "a comedy of astonishing intelligence and finish". Greene emphasized the "witty dialogue, [and] the quick intelligent acting" of Tone and Merkel, commenting that the film felt "[bathed] in an atmosphere fantastic, daring and pleasantly heartless".

== See also ==
- Life Goes On (1932)
