= Harcourt Templeman =

British screenwriter, film producer & director

Harcourt Templeman was a British screenwriter, film producer and director.

== Selected filmography ==
Director

- There's Many a Slip (1925)
- A Medical Mystery (1925)
- The Bells (1931)
- Money Means Nothing (1932)

Producer

- Hyde Park Corner (1935)
- The Gay Adventure (1936)
- Midnight Menace (1937)
- Take a Chance (1937)
- Command Performance (1937)
- Follow Your Star (1938)
