= Walter Hackett =

American dramatist (1876–1944)

- Born: Walter Laurence Hackett; November 10, 1876; Oakland, California, U.S.
- Died: January 20, 1944 (aged 67); Manhattan, New York, U.S.
- Education: University of California, Berkeley
- Occupations: Playwright; theater manager
- Spouse: Marion Lorne (m. 1911)

Walter Laurence Hackett (usually referred to as Walter Hackett, sometimes given as Walter L. Hackett or Walter Lawrence Hackett, and erroneously given as Walter C. Hackett) (Note: Some sources such as the Historical Dictionary of American Theater: Modernism list Hackett's middle initial as C and refer to him as Walter C. Hackett. However, this middle initial is in error as it does not match primary documents which indicates he was born with the name Walter Laurence Hackett. Walter L. Hackett is the name used in the 1880 United States census, and Walter Laurence Hackett is the name used in the 1942 World War II draft registration card, and his 1896 voter registration record in California uses Walter Lawrence Hacket. Newspaper reports from his native city of Oakland, California also refer to him as Walter L. Hackett, as do British newspaper reports and court documents from Hackett's 1940 filing of bankruptcy. As a writer he was predominantly known as Walter Hackett without a middle initial. However, as a journalist he did use Walter L. Hackett as his byline. His 1899 short story "In the Service of the Czar" was republished in 1904 with his full name, Walter Laurence Hackett. The Digital Collections at the New York Public Library has hand written letters by Hackett in which he signs his name Walter Laurence Hackett; indicating the author had a preference for this spelling of his middle name.) (November 10, 1876 – January 20, 1944) was an American playwright and theater manager. A native of Oakland, California, Hackett attended grammar school in that city before continuing his education at a boarding school in Canada, the country of his father's birth. He ran away from that institution to become a sailor, and subsequently worked in a variety of professions including horse trainer and school teacher. By 1901, he was working as a journalist for the Chicago American, and that same year his first plays were staged with casts led by the actress Lillian Burkhart. His first significant play as a solo playwright was The Prince of Dreams, staged in Chicago in 1902.

Hackett was primarily active as a journalist and a writer of short stories until he had three successful plays in succession, written with other writers: The Invader (1908, co-authored with Robert Hobart Davis); The Regeneration (1908, co-authored with Owen Kildare); and The White Sister (1909, co-authored with Francis Marion Crawford). The latter two plays were his first works staged on Broadway. His next two plays to reach Broadway, Our World (1911) and Don't Weaken (1914) were flops, but he rebounded with the hit play It Pays to Advertise (1914). In 1911, he married the actress Marion Lorne. Many of his plays were written with Lorne in mind, and she was often the star of his works. In 1914, the couple moved to London, England where they remained for more than 25 years. From this point on, most of his plays were staged in London's West End, and he earned the nickname Walter "Long Run" Hackett for his many plays that had lengthy runs in London. In Britain some of his most successful plays included Ambrose Applejohn's Adventure, The Fugitives, and London After Dark. Not long after the outbreak of World War II, Hackett and his wife returned to the United States and settled in New York City. He died in Manhattan in 1944.

== Early life ==
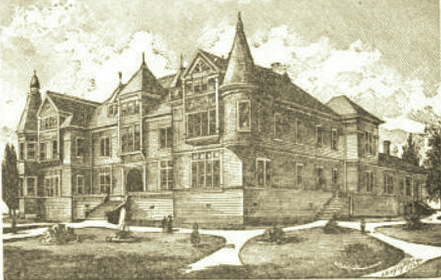
Fabiola Hospital in Oakland, California

Walter Laurence Hackett was born in Oakland, California, on November 10, 1876. He was the son of Captain Edward Hackett, who lived in Oakland at a home at 1303 Jackson Street. Walter was listed as living at that address with his father and his mother, Mary Ann Hackett (née Haight), and as an attendee of public schools in Oakland, in the 1880 United States census. Walter later attended boarding school in Canada, the nation of his father's birth. He ran away from that institution to obtain work as a sailor. He later attended the University of California, Berkeley.

In his young adulthood, Hackett worked in a variety of professions, including careers as a horse trainer, school teacher, journalist, and writer of short stories. By 1895 he was working in Oakland as a horse trainer. He was head of the planning committee for the horse races held at the 1895 Mayday fete of the Fabiola Hospital Association which took place at Oakland Trotting Park as a fund raiser for the hospital. This also included organizing a burro race for which he acquired ten donkeys. He also served as one of the judges for the horse races, and was praised for his work on the front page of The Oakland Times on May 13, 1895. The following year he was appointed to the executive committee of the fete. His 1896 voter registration record indicates he was living in the Hackett family home on Jackson Street.

In 1899, he performed in a show called Chirps put on by Oakland's Athenian Club of which he was a member. He had his first professional experiences in theatre working as a "corner-man" in a minstrel show operated by J. H. Haverly.

== Early writing career in the United States ==
=== Short story writer and journalist ===
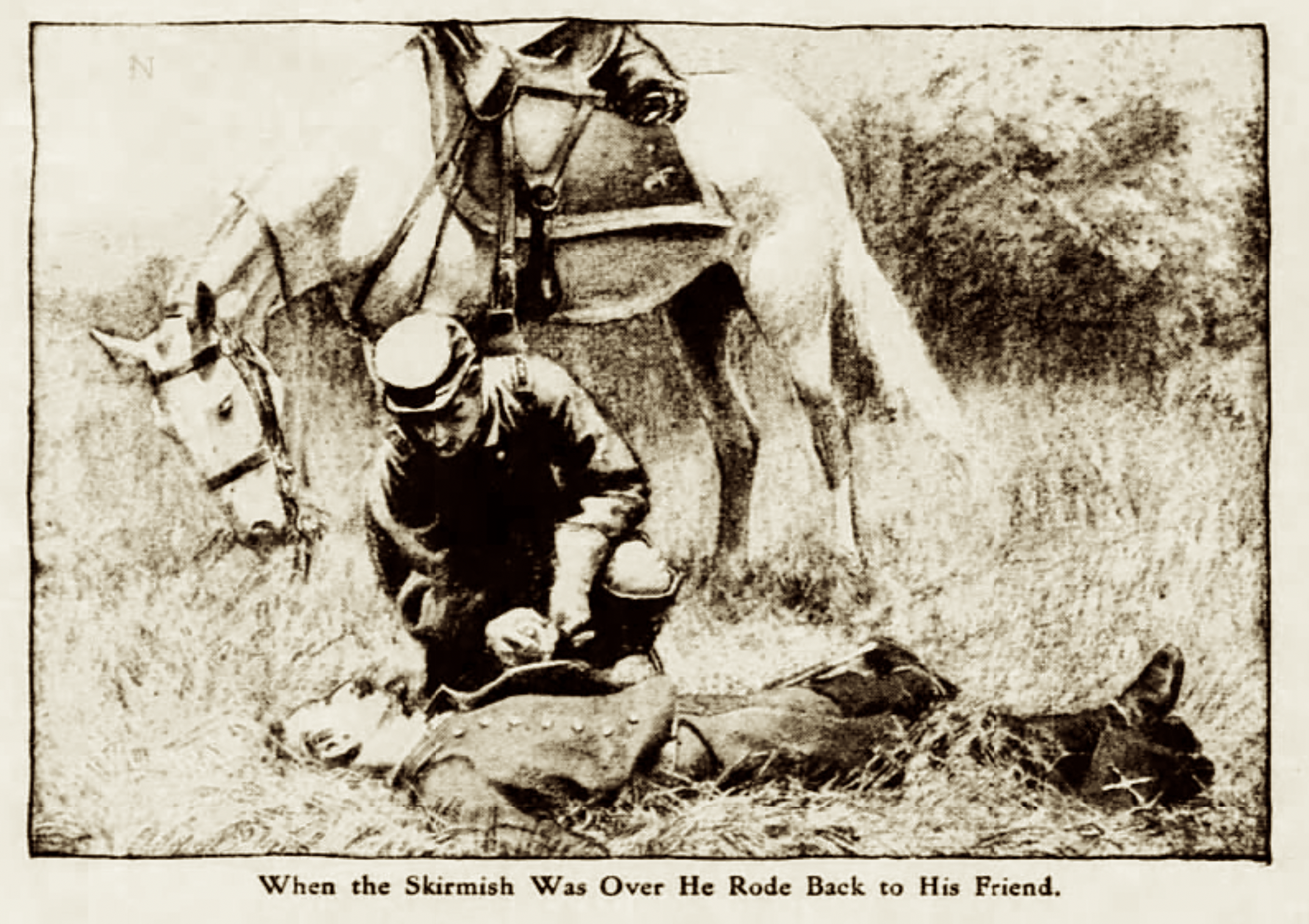
Illustration from Hackett's 1907 short story "A Life for a Life" by artist Emlen McConnell

Hackett began his writing career as a writer of short stories. His short story "In the Service of the Czar" was published by the Short Story Publishing Company in 1899 under his full name, Walter Laurence Hackett. It was later republished in The Kansas Review on July 29, 1904, and was subsequently picked up by other American newspapers.

Hackett also worked as a journalist and by 1901 was in Chicago working as the city editor for the Chicago American. He later became a dramatic editor at the paper, and succeeded A. P. Dunlap as lead drama critic and editor in 1903. He was present at the First inauguration of Theodore Roosevelt on September 14, 1901, in Buffalo, New York, and his reporting on that event appeared as a special dispatch in newspapers nationally. In 1903, he was listed as a member of the Chicago Symphony Orchestra's Auxiliary Committee.

Hackett's short ghost story "Bill Bowden, A.B. Sees Things" was published in American and Canadian newspapers in February 1906. This was followed by the short story "Bill Bowden on Hoodoos" the following month. On July 29, 1906, several larger papers published his short story "In the Valley of the Shadow", including The Washington Star and the New-York Tribune. These papers also published his short stories "The Governors Decision" (1906), "His Father's Son" (1907), "The Cardinal's Decision" (1907), "The Derelict" (1907), "Winchester and Company" (1907), "The Oasis in the Desert" (1907), "The District Attorney" (1907), "A Life for a Life" (1907), "Sonia" (1908), and "Pardners" (1908). He also contributed work as a journalist to The Washington Star and New-York Tribune.

Hackett's short story "The Society Dinner" was published in Broadway Magazine in June 1907. Other short stories written by Hackett that were published in periodicals included "Captain Arthur's Bride" (1907) "Pie" (1907), "The Electric Light Bill" (1907), "Rodman's Ambition" (1907), "The Name She Whispered" (1907), "In Deep Waters" (1908), "Mr Garfield's Matrimonial Experiment" (1908), "Miss Lowell's Lover" (1908), "The Theft of the Dudley Diamonds" (1908), "The Wheel of Fortune" (1909), "The Gazebrook Necklace" (1909), and "Otto Schmalz, Hypnotist" (1909).

In addition to working as a writer, Hackett also worked on the business staff of producers Klaw and Erlanger in the first decade of the 20th century.

=== Playwright ===
==== Early plays ====
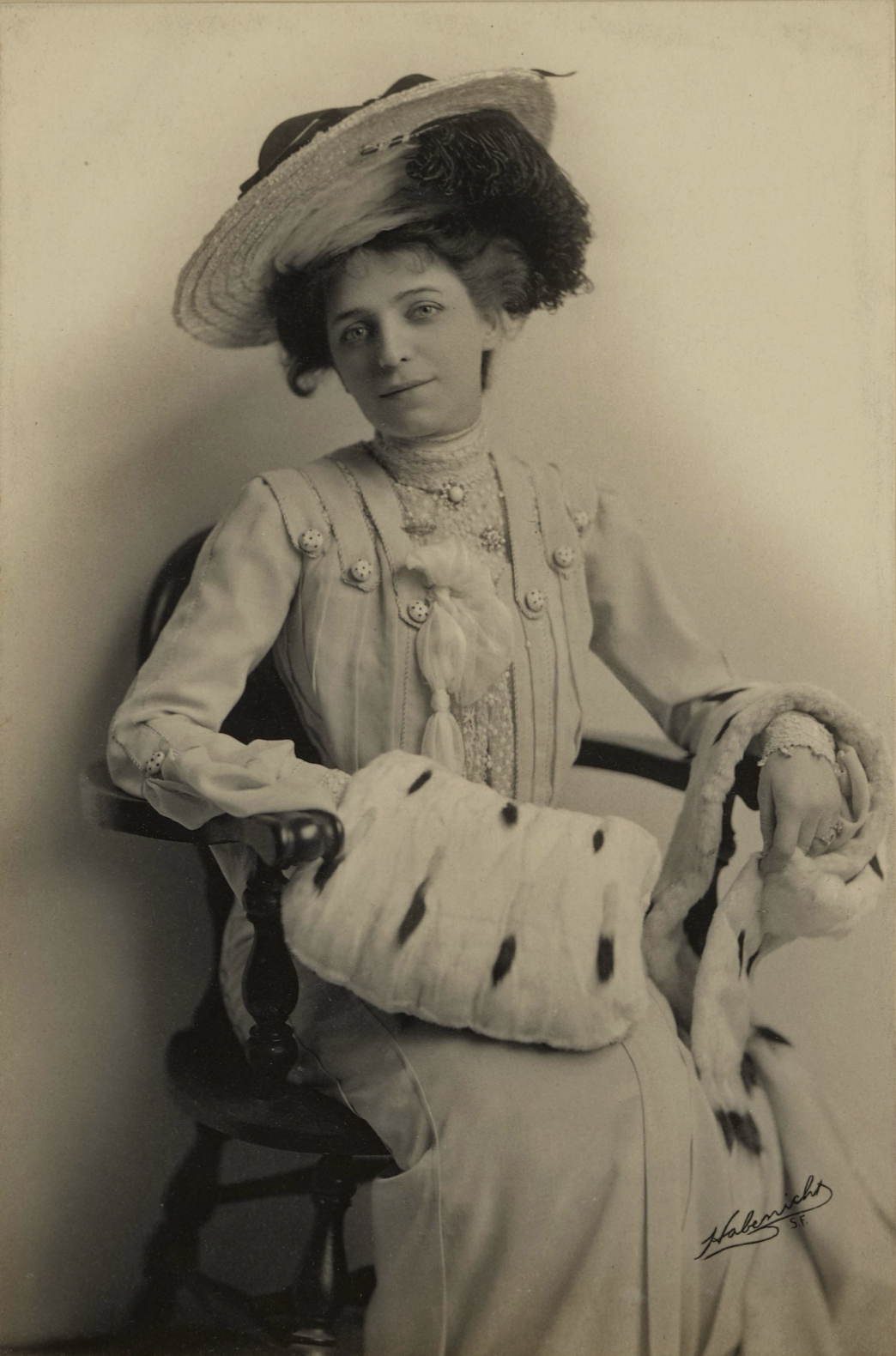
Lillian Burkhart starred in Hackett's first plays.

Hackett's first stage work, the musical "playlet" Jessie's Jack and Jerry was given its premiere at Keith's Theatre in Philadelphia on March 11, 1901. He co-wrote this work with playwright Francis Livingston, and the production starred Camille D'Arville and Lillian Burkhart. The production toured in 1901–1902, including performances at Chicago's Olympic Theater and Shea's Garden Theatre in Buffalo, New York.

Hackett collaborated with Livingston again on a second play, the one-act farce The Way to Win a Husband, which they wrote specifically for Burkhart. Burkhart toured in this play in 1901–1902, including performances in Chicago, Los Angeles, and New York City. In 1902, the actor Emmett Corrigan acquired the rights to Hackett's first full-length play, the three act comedy The Prince of Dreams. It premiered at the Grand Opera House in Freeport, Illinois, on November 17, 1902, in a performance by the Player's Stock Company of Chicago. It then transferred to the Bush Temple of Music in Chicago.

==== Hit plays of 1908: The Regeneration and The Invader ====
Hackett spent the next several years focused on writing short stories, and his next play, My Mamie Rose, did not reach the stage until 1908. It was co-written with Owen Kildare and premiered at Poli's Theater in Waterbury, Connecticut, on January 27, 1908, in a cast led by Arnold Daly, Chrystal Herne, Helen Ware, and Holbrook Blinn. The production toured the United States, including a stop at the Studebaker Theater in Chicago where it opened in March 1908. In Chicago the play was reworked and re-titled The Regeneration. Daly brought the play to Broadway later in the year but with some cast alterations. It opened at Wallack's Theatre on September 1, 1908, to a glowing review in The New York Times which predicted a long run for the play.

Hackett co-wrote his next play, The Invader, with Robert Hobart Davis. It was given its premiere in Milwaukee by the Pabst Theatre English Stock Company on May 18, 1908, with a cast led by Christine Norman, Janet Beecher, Jack Standing, and Robert Conness. The play was based on the real life events of the Panic of 1907 and the role F. Augustus Heinze played in that financial crises. The play was then staged at McVicker's Theater in Chicago. The Chicago production was with a completely different cast which included the actors Florence Rockwell, Edmund Breese, Thomas A. Wise, Charles H. Riegel, and William B. Mack. Later that year the play was staged at the Shrine Auditorium in Los Angeles.

==== The White Sister ====
Hackett co-wrote The White Sister with Francis Marion Crawford, a work which Crawford had previously written as first an unperformed play and then as a serialized novel in Munsey's Magazine. The idea for this collaborative project was birthed in 1907 when Hackett visited Crawford at his home in Sorrento, Italy. The play tells the tale of lovers Giovanna and Giovanni who separated by the events of a war. Giovanni is believed to have been killed and Giovanna becomes a nun only to be unexpectedly reunited with him years later while nursing him in a hospital. Crawford then collaborated with Hackett on a new stage adaptation which was the dramatic version that ultimately made it to the stage.

The White Sister was given its premiere on February 8, 1909, at the Stone Opera House in Binghamton, New York, and ran on Broadway later that year at Daly's Theatre with Viola Allen as Giovanna and William Farnum as Giovanni. A success, The New York Times later listed The White Sister along with It Pays to Advertise and Captain Applejack as the works for which Hackett was "best known" when he died in 1944. The play was adapted into films in 1915, 1923, 1933, and 1960.

==== C.O.D. and other plays of 1910–1912 ====
On Valentine's Day 1910, Hackett's play In the Mountains was performed for the first time at the Auditorium Theatre in Baltimore with a cast led by the actress Percy Haswell. The play told the tale of two feuding families, the Lees and the Claybournes, who live along the Kentucky and Tennessee border. After this he collaborated with dramatist Stanislaus Stange on the play Get Busy With Emily, an English-language adaptation of the 1906 French farce Vous n'avez rien à déclarer? by Maurice Hennequin and Pierre Veber. Produced by A. H. Woods, it premiered at the Cort Theatre in Chicago on May 8, 1910.

He next collaborated with Ren Shields in writing the book for the musical The Simple Life which had a score by composer P. D. DeCoster. It premiered on August 8, 1910, at the Savoy Theatre in Atlantic City with a cast of 50 led by Charles J. Ross.

Hackett sold the rights to a play he wrote entitled C.O.D. to playwright Eugene Walter. Walter altered the play and retitled it Homeward Bound for its premiere in December 1910 with Hackett credited as inspiring the theme of the play. Hackett disputed this credit, claiming he should be billed as a co-author of the work. Walter disputed Hackett's claim; stating that while Hackett had written the initial play, that after Walter purchased the rights to the work that he had almost completely remade the entire work. He stated that "less than 200 words" of Hackett's original text remained in the play. The play was later retitled Mrs. Maxwell's Mistake and was presented on Broadway at Maxine Elliott's Theatre in April 1911, and was retitled yet again as Fine Feathers for a production in Chicago. In 1912, Hackett sued Walter for failing to credit him as a co-author of the work. In December 1912, Justice Edward Everett McCall of the New York Supreme Court granted an injunction preventing Fine Feathers from being performed unless Walter was credited as a co-author while the court considered the case. Ultimately the court determined that Walter had sufficiently transformed the work, and could claim to be the sole author of the piece.

Hackett's play Our World was given its premiere at the Fulton Opera House in Lancaster, Pennsylvania, on January 27, 1911, with Amelia Gardner, Doris Keane, Campbell Gullan, Malcolm Duncan, and Vincent Serrano in the lead roles. It then toured to Broadway's Garrick Theatre where it opened on February 6, 1911. The play investigated the theme of heredity with an examination of the daughter of a courtesan, and whether or not she was able to rise above the vices of her mother's tainted past.

After this, Hackett was one of many writers who worked on the book for the musical A Certain Party which toured prior to reaching Broadway's Wallack's Theatre on April 23, 1911. He then created the play Honest Jim Blunt for the character actor Tim Murphy, but the play had only a short life on the New York stage in 1912.

==== Marriage and plays of 1913 and 1914 ====
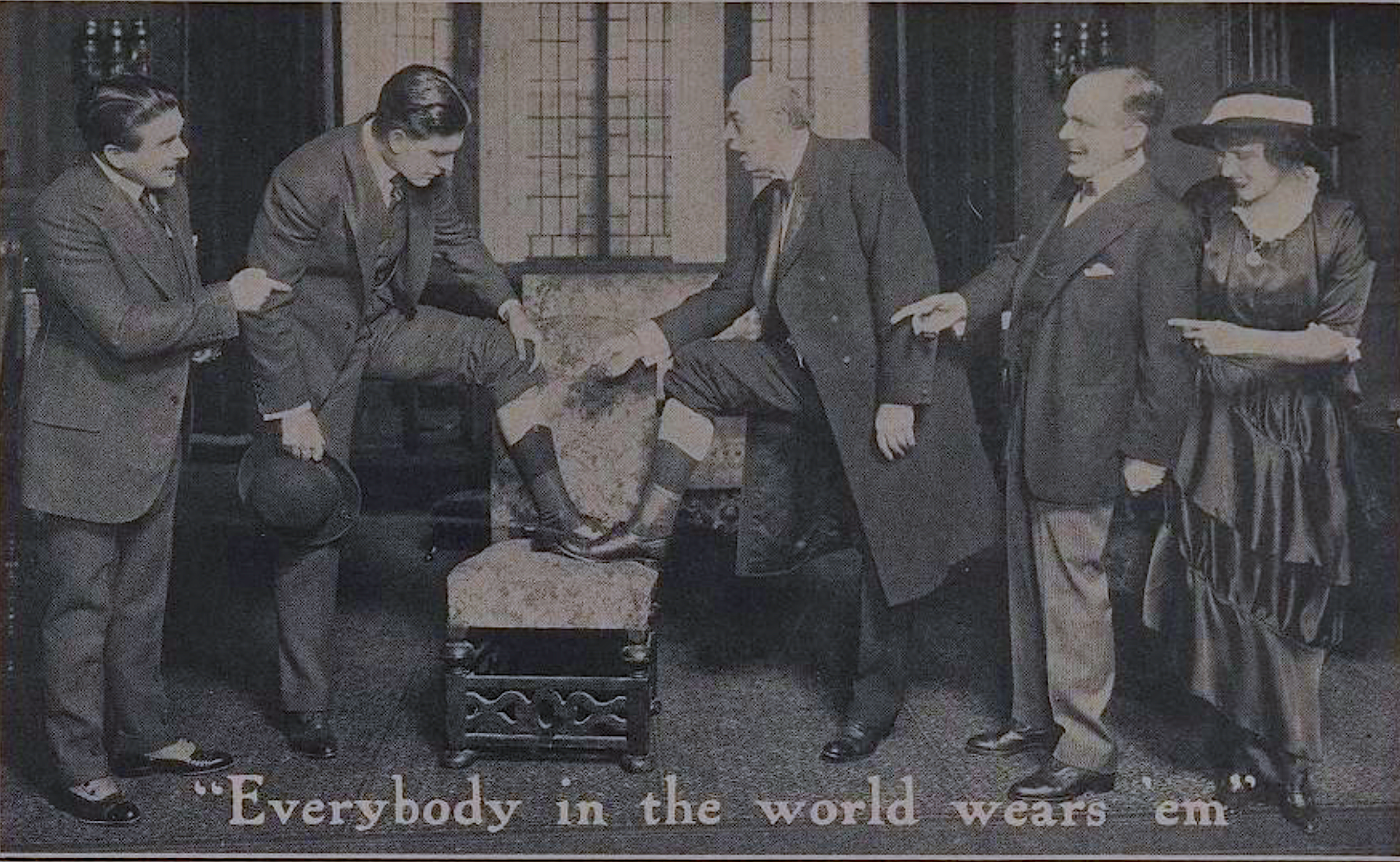
1914 Broadway cast of It Pays to Advertise

On September 16, 1911, Hackett and the actress Marion Lorne acquired a marriage license in Jersey City, New Jersey, with plans to have a wedding ceremony at a future date. The couple remained married until his death in 1944, and Lorne starred in many of her husband's plays. Her first appearance in one of Hackett's plays was as Mrs. Kent in Don't Weaken which was given its premiere at The Playhouse in Wilmington, Delaware, on December 29, 1913. That play was produced by William A. Brady and George Broadhurst, and ran on Broadway for a short period at Maxine Elliott's Theatre. While The Brooklyn Citizen gave the play a glowing review that described it as "out of the ordinary", The New York Times described the work as "pleasant" and an "optimistic little comedy" but found the work derivative and therefore unlikely to generate much interest.

Don't Weaken was preceded by another failure for Hackett, the one act play To Die Like a Man. It premiered on Labor Day 1913 at the Colonial Theater in Cleveland, Ohio to scathing reviews in the local press. Hackett rebounded however with the hit 1914 play It Pays to Advertise which he co-authored with Roi Cooper Megrue. It had a lengthy run of more than a year at the George M. Cohan's Theatre, and was notably the longest running play of the 1914–1915 Broadway season. Samuel Field converted the play into a novel which was published in 1915 by Duffield & Company.

== Life in England ==
=== Move to London and 1910s plays ===
In February 1914, Hackett and his wife traveled to England on what was supposed to be a belated honeymoon. They ended up staying and lived in London for the next 25 years. His first play staged in London was 9 to 11 which was performed for the grand re-opening of Wyndham's Theatre which just been extensively renovated. It opened there one July 14, 1914, with a cast led by Allan Aynesworth and Lettice Fairfax. The Times described the work as a "wild burlesque of the detective romance", and, while noting positive response from the audience, its critic stated that the play "may be found amusing by playgoers whose critical sense melts in the July temperatures." American newspapers reported that the play might have been plagiarized off of Charles Hawtrey's Seven Keys to Baldspate which was planned to premiere in the autumn of 1914; however, the Boston Evening Transcript was skeptical of the accusation stating "the similarity is very difficult to discover".

Hackett's second play for the London stage, He Didn't Want to Do It, premiered at the Prince of Wales Theatre on March 6, 1915, with a cast led by Joseph Coyne, Frederick Kerr, and Lydia Bilbrook. Co-written with George Broadhurst It fared better with the critics. The Observer stated in its review, "This is the most audacious piece of farcical complication ever attempted. If it had not 'come off' it would have been silly beyond endurance. But it does 'come off'; it goes on coming off until the spectator can bear it no longer." The play notably marked the London stage debut of Hackett's wife who portrayed Marjorie Thompson in the production. Lorne also starred in Hackett's next play, Mr. and Mrs. Ponsonby, which premiered at London's Comedy Theatre in June 1915. The American press noted at the time that Hackett had achieved greater success with London audiences and critics than he had in America.

Hackett's next work was the murder mystery play The Barton Mystery which was first performed to success at the Savoy Theatre in London where it opened on March 22, 1916. The character of Beverley in the play, portrayed by Harry Brodribb Irving, is a psychic medium who is brought in to investigate a murder. An article in The Theosophist described the play "as being remarkable, if only for the fact it is the first in which psychic research has been introduced seriously on the English stage." While the London production had a respectable run of 165 performances, a 1917 Broadway production at New York's Comedy Theatre closed after just 20 performances. However, the work was successfully staged in a French-language translation at the Théâtre Antoine-Simone Berriau in Paris in 1917, with Firmin Gémier as Beverley.

In October 1916, Hackett's play Mr. Jubilee Drax premiered at the Theatre Royal Haymarket. He co-wrote the work with Horace Annesley Vachell. Another play in the detective genre, it failed to repeat the success of The Barton Mystery. The Daily Telegraph noted in its critical assessment that "the American trick of presenting past events in action was carried beyond the limits of all reason." Actor Walker Whiteside portrayed the role of the lead detective in production staged in Chicago in 1917. His next work, the revue £150, was also a critical failure. It premiered at the Ambassadors Theatre on April 30, 1917. Charles B. Cochran produced the work, and the cast included Daisy Burrell and Alec Clunes.

Hackett's next play, The Invisible Foe, fared far better when it premiered at the Savoy Theatre in August 1917. Another mystery with supernatural undertones, the play was based on the pseudoscientific spiritualism beliefs of Oliver Lodge. The actress Fay Compton received high praise in the press for her role in this production. It closed in December 1917.

In 1918, Hackett's play The Freedom of the Seas was staged at the Royalty Theatre. He wrote the play on commission from Seymour Hicks.

=== 1920s plays ===
Leslie Banks and Fay Compton in Other Men's Wives

In 1920, Hackett's play Mr. Todd's Experiment was staged at the Queen's Theatre. His play Ambrose Applejohn's Adventure was first performed at the Theatre Royal, Brighton in July 1921 before running on the West End in 1921–1922 at first the Criterion Theatre and later the Savoy Theatre. It was also staged on Broadway at the Cort Theatre in 1921 under the name Captain Applejack.

Hackett's Other Men's Wives (1928) was another play that premiered Theatre Royal, Brighton before moving to the West End in May 1928 where it played first at Wyndham's Theatre followed by further performances at St Martin's Theatre, ultimately closing there in August 1928. His next play, 77 Park Lane, premiered at St Martin's Theatre on October 25, 1928, and was later revived in the West End at the Regent Theatre in 1930.

Hackett also had two plays premiere at His Majesty's Theatre in the 1920s, The Wicked Earl (1927), and Sorry You've Been Troubled (1929).

=== 1930s plays ===
On September 29, 1930, Hackett's The Way to Treat a Woman was performed for the inauguration of the newly built Whitehall Theatre near Trafalgar Square after previously having that play's premiere at the Duke of York's Theatre on June 11, 1930. Hackett was manager of the Duke of York's Theatre in 1930, and then he and his wife were in control of the Whitehall Theatre from 1930 to 1934. Several of Hackett's plays were premiered at Whitehall during this period, including Take a Chance (1931), Good Losers (1931), The Gay Adventure (1931), Road House (1932), and Afterwards (1933).

After leaving the Whitehall Theatre, Hackett took up the lease at the Apollo Theatre where the premieres of his plays Hyde Park Corner (1934), Espionage (1935), and London After Dark (1937) occurred. He left the Apollo in 1938 when he took over the lease of the Vaudeville Theatre. His tenure at that theatre began with the premiere of his play Toss of a Coin on March 17, 1938; a murder mystery in which Hackett's wife Marion portrayed both a mother and her daughter. It was the 22nd of Hackett's plays staged in the West End that Marion starred in.

== Later life in New York ==
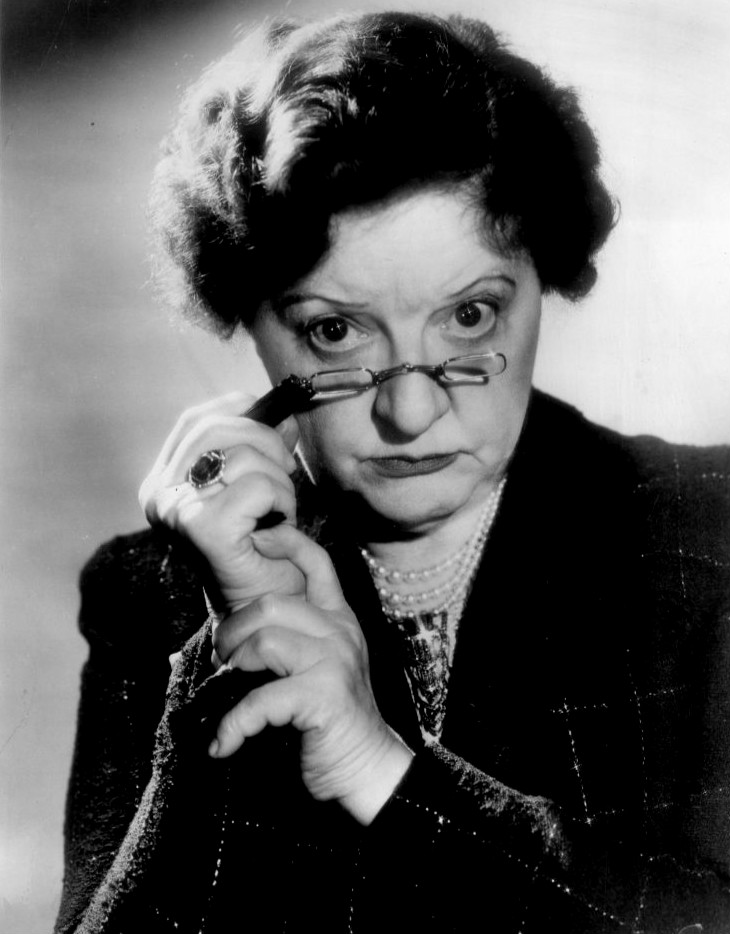
Hackett's wife Marion Lorne in the 1957 American television sitcom Sally

In 1940, Hackett returned to the United States and settled with his wife in New York City. He died at Mount Sinai Hospital in Manhattan after being ill for a short period of time on January 20, 1944.

== Works ==
=== Selected short stories ===
- "In the Service of the Czar" (1899)
- "Bill Bowden, A.B. Sees Things" (1906)
- "Bill Bowden on Hoodoos" (1906)
- "In the Valley of the Shadow" (1906)
- "The Governors Decision" (1906)
- "His Father's Son" (1907)
- "The Cardinal's Decision" (1907)
- "The Derelict" (1907)
- "Winchester and Company" (1907)
- "The Oasis in the Desert" (1907)
- "The District Attorney" (1907)
- "A Life for a Life" (1907)
- "Captain Arthur's Bride" (1907)
- "Pie" (1907)
- "The Electric Light Bill" (1907)
- "Rodman's Ambition" (1907)
- "The Name She Whispered" (1907)
- "In Deep Waters" (1908)
- "Sonia" (1908)
- "Pardners" (1908)
- "Mr Garfield's Matrimonial Experiment" (1908)
- "Miss Lowell's Lover" (1908)
- "The Wheel of Fortune" (1909)
- "Otto Schmalz, Hypnotist" (1909)
- "The Grocers" (1915)

=== Selected plays and film adaptations ===
The following is an incomplete list of plays by Walter Hackett. Many of Hackett's plays were adapted into films. Only film adaptations with articles on the English Wikipedia are included in this chart. This is not a complete list of all film adaptations of Hackett's plays.

The dashed cells only indicate the absence of coverage of a film adaption of a particular play currently on the English Wikipedia.

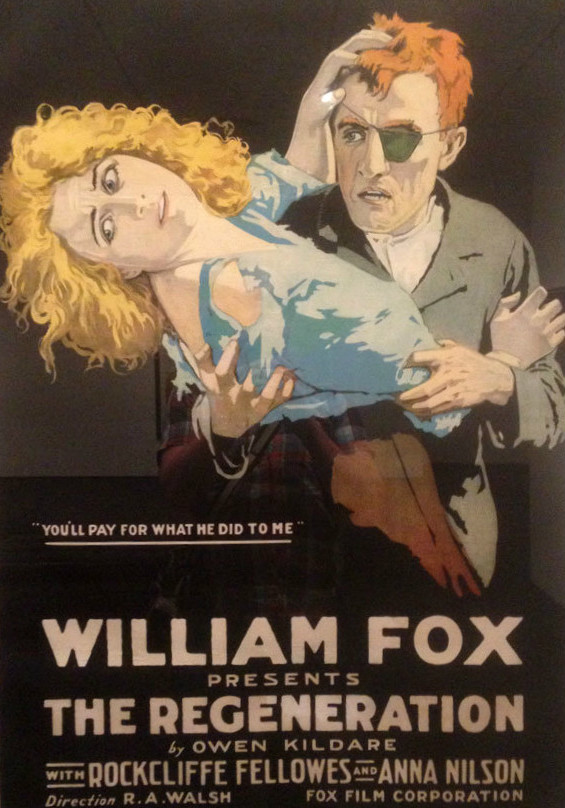
Poster for the 1915 film adaptation The Regeneration

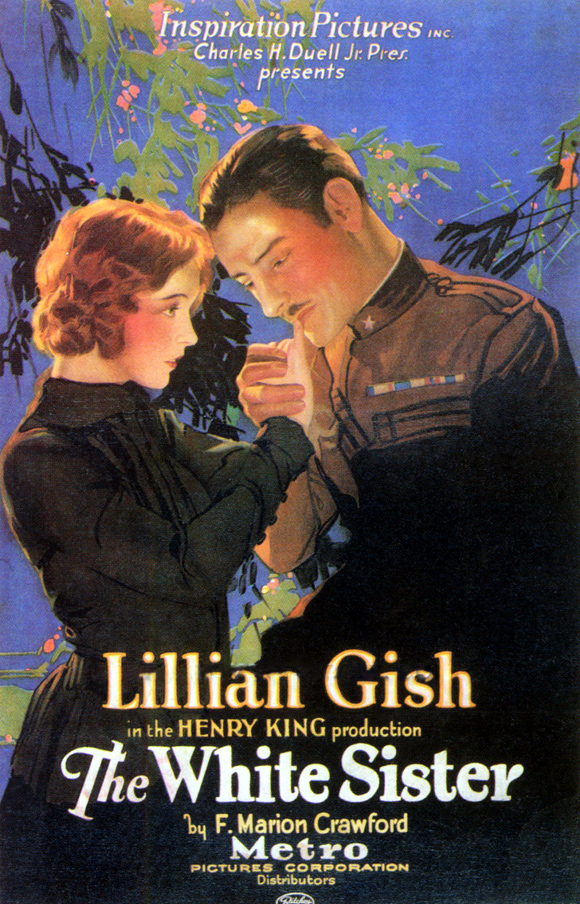
Poster for the 1923 film adaptation The White Sister

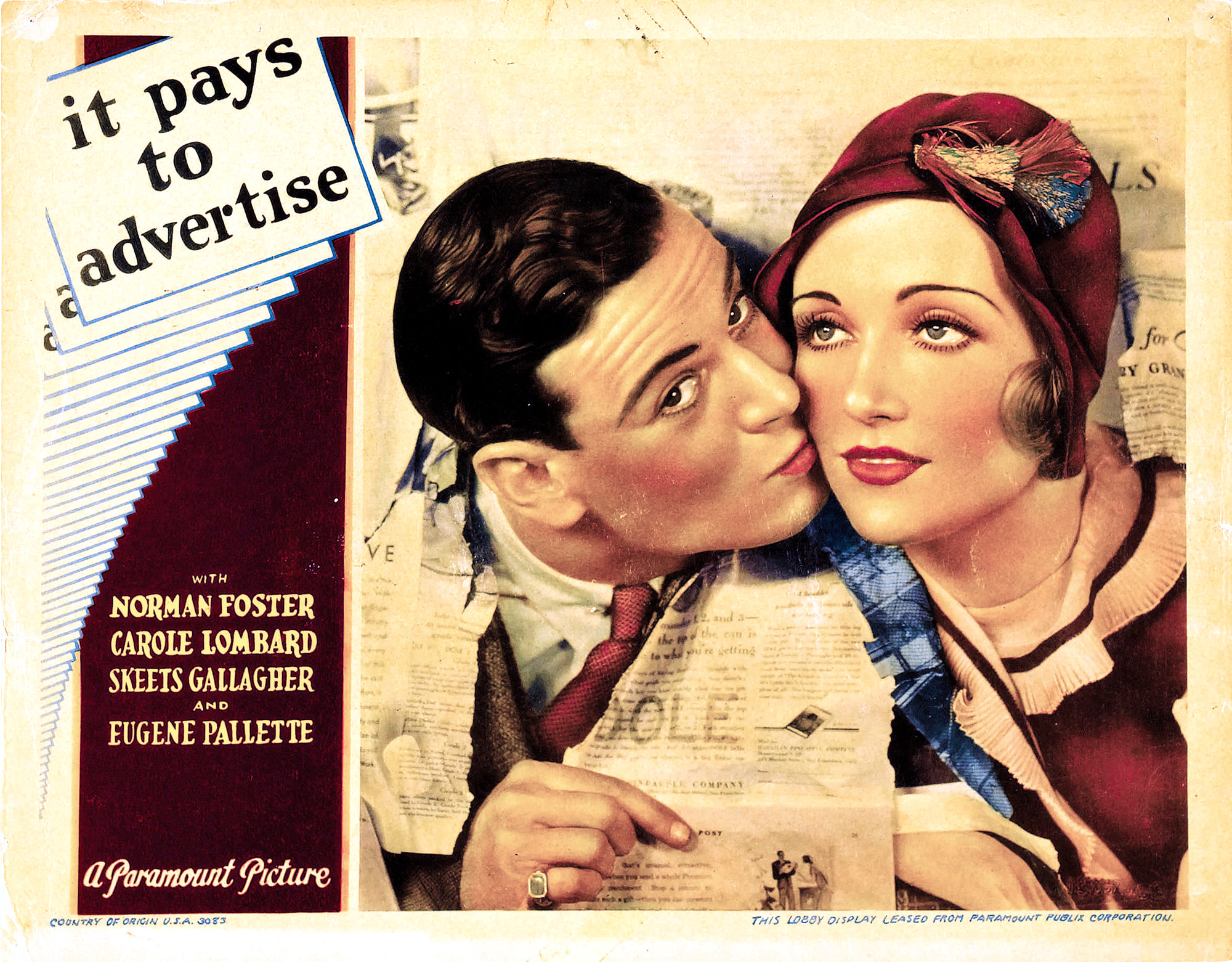
Lobby card for the 1931 film adaptation It Pays to Advertise

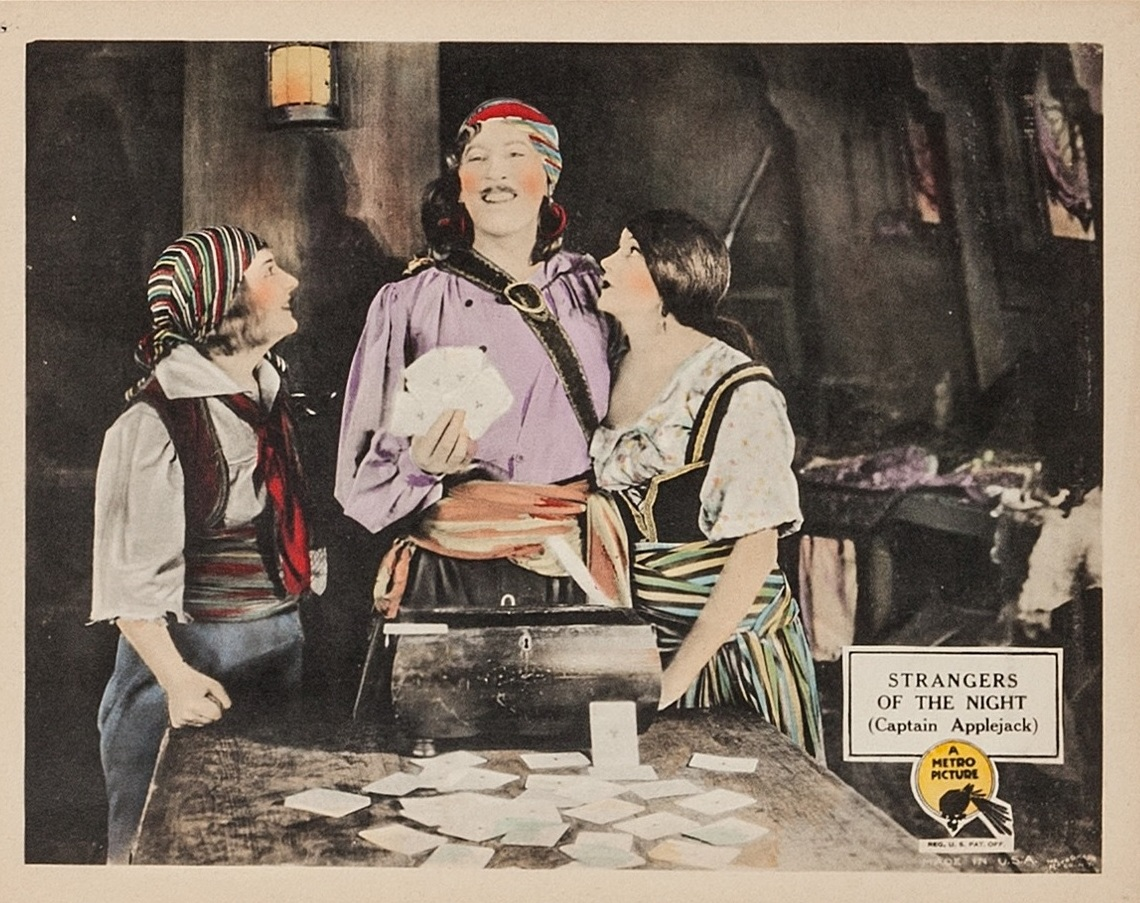
Lobby card for the American comedy film Strangers of the Night based on Hackett's Captain Applejack

Play	Playwright(s)	Film	Film director	Ref.
Jessie's Jack and Jerry (1901)	Francis Livingston; Walter Hackett	—N/a	—N/a	
The Way to Win a Husband (1901)	Francis Livingston; Walter Hackett	—N/a	—N/a	
The Prince of Dreams (1902)	Walter Hackett	—N/a	—N/a	
The Invader (1908)	Robert Hobart Davis; Walter Hackett	—N/a	—N/a	
The Regeneration (1908, original title My Mamie Rose)	Walter Hackett; Owen Kildare	The Regeneration (1915)	Raoul Walsh	
The White Sister (1909)	Francis Marion Crawford; Walter Hackett	The White Sister (1915)	Fred E. Wright	
The White Sister (1909)	Francis Marion Crawford; Walter Hackett	The White Sister (1923)	Henry King	
The White Sister (1909)	Francis Marion Crawford; Walter Hackett	The White Sister (1933)	Victor Fleming	
The White Sister (1909)	Francis Marion Crawford; Walter Hackett	The White Sister (1960)	Tito Davison	
In the Mountains (1910)	Walter Hackett	—N/a	—N/a	
Get Busy With Emily (1910)	Stanislaus Stange; Walter Hackett	—N/a	—N/a	
The Simple Life (1910)	Walter Hackett; Ren Shields; P. D. DeCoster	—N/a	—N/a	
C.O.D. (1910, adapted into Fine Feathers by Eugene Walter)	Walter Hackett	—N/a	—N/a	
Our World (1911)	Walter Hackett	—N/a	—N/a	
A Certain Party (1911)	Walter Hackett	—N/a	—N/a	
Honest Jim Blunt (1912)	Walter Hackett	—N/a	—N/a	
To Die Like a Man (1913)	Walter Hackett	—N/a	—N/a	
Don't Weaken (1913)	Walter Hackett	—N/a	—N/a	
9 to 11 (1914)	Walter Hackett	—N/a	—N/a	
It Pays to Advertise (1914)	Roi Cooper Megrue; Walter Hackett	It Pays to Advertise (1919)	Donald Crisp	
It Pays to Advertise (1914)	Roi Cooper Megrue; Walter Hackett	It Pays to Advertise (1931)	Frank Tuttle	
It Pays to Advertise (1914)	Roi Cooper Megrue; Walter Hackett	Criez-le sur les toits (1932)	Karl Anton	
It Pays to Advertise (1914)	Roi Cooper Megrue; Walter Hackett	It Pays to Advertise (1936)	Anders Henrikson	
He Didn't Want to Do It (1915)	Walter Hackett	—N/a	—N/a	
Mr. and Mrs. Ponsonby (1915)	Walter Hackett	—N/a	—N/a	
The Barton Mystery (1916)	Walter Hackett	The Barton Mystery (1920)	Harry T. Roberts	
The Barton Mystery (1916)	Walter Hackett	The Barton Mystery (1932)	Henry Edwards	
The Barton Mystery (1916)	Walter Hackett	The Barton Mystery (1949)	Charles Spaak	
Mr. Jubilee Drax (1916)	Horace Annesley Vachell; Walter Hackett	—N/a	—N/a	
Taken from Life (1916)	W. Taylor; Walter Hackett	—N/a	—N/a	
£150 (1917)	Walter Hackett	—N/a	—N/a	
The Invisible Foe (1917)	Walter Hackett	Whispering Shadows(1921)	Émile Chautard	
The Freedom of the Seas (1918)	Walter Hackett	Freedom of the Seas (1934)	Marcel Varnel	
Mr. Todd's Experiment (1920)	Walter Hackett	—N/a	—N/a	
Captain Applejack (1921, also known as Ambrose Applejohn's Adventure)	Walter Hackett	Strangers of the Night (1923)	Fred Niblo	
Captain Applejack (1921, also known as Ambrose Applejohn's Adventure)	Walter Hackett	Captain Applejack (1931)	Hobart Henley	
Pansy's Arabian Nights (1924)	Walter Hackett	—N/a	—N/a	
The Wicked Earl (1927)	Walter Hackett	—N/a	—N/a	
Other Men's Wives (1928)	Walter Hackett	Sweethearts and Wives (1930)	Clarence G. Badger	
77 Park Lane (1928)	Walter Hackett	77 Park Lane (1931)	Albert de Courville	
77 Park Lane (1928)	Walter Hackett	77 Rue Chalgrin (1931)	Albert de Courville	
77 Park Lane (1928)	Walter Hackett	Between Night and Day (1932)	Albert de Courville; Fernando Gomis	
Sorry You've Been Troubled (1929)	Walter Hackett	Life Goes On (1932)	Jack Raymond	
Sorry You've Been Troubled (1929)	Walter Hackett	One New York Night (1935)	Jack Conway	
The Way to Treat a Woman (1930)	Walter Hackett	—N/a	—N/a	
Good Losers (1931)	Walter Hackett; Michael Arlen	—N/a	—N/a	
Take a Chance (1931)	Walter Hackett	Take a Chance (1937)	Sinclair Hill	
The Gay Adventure (1931)	Walter Hackett	The Gay Adventure (1936)	Sinclair Hill	
Road House (1932)	Walter Hackett	Road House (1934)	Maurice Elvey	
Afterwards (1933)	Walter Hackett	Their Big Moment (1934)	James Cruze	
Hyde Park Corner (1934)	Walter Hackett	Hyde Park Corner (1935)	Sinclair Hill	
Espionage (1935)	Walter Hackett	Espionage (film) (1937)	Kurt Neumann	
The Fugitives (1936)	Walter Hackett	Love Under Fire (1937)	George Marshall	
London After Dark (1937)	Walter Hackett	—N/a	—N/a	
Toss of a Coin (1938)	Walter Hackett	—N/a	—N/a	
