= Espionage (1937 film) =

1937 film by Kurt Neumann

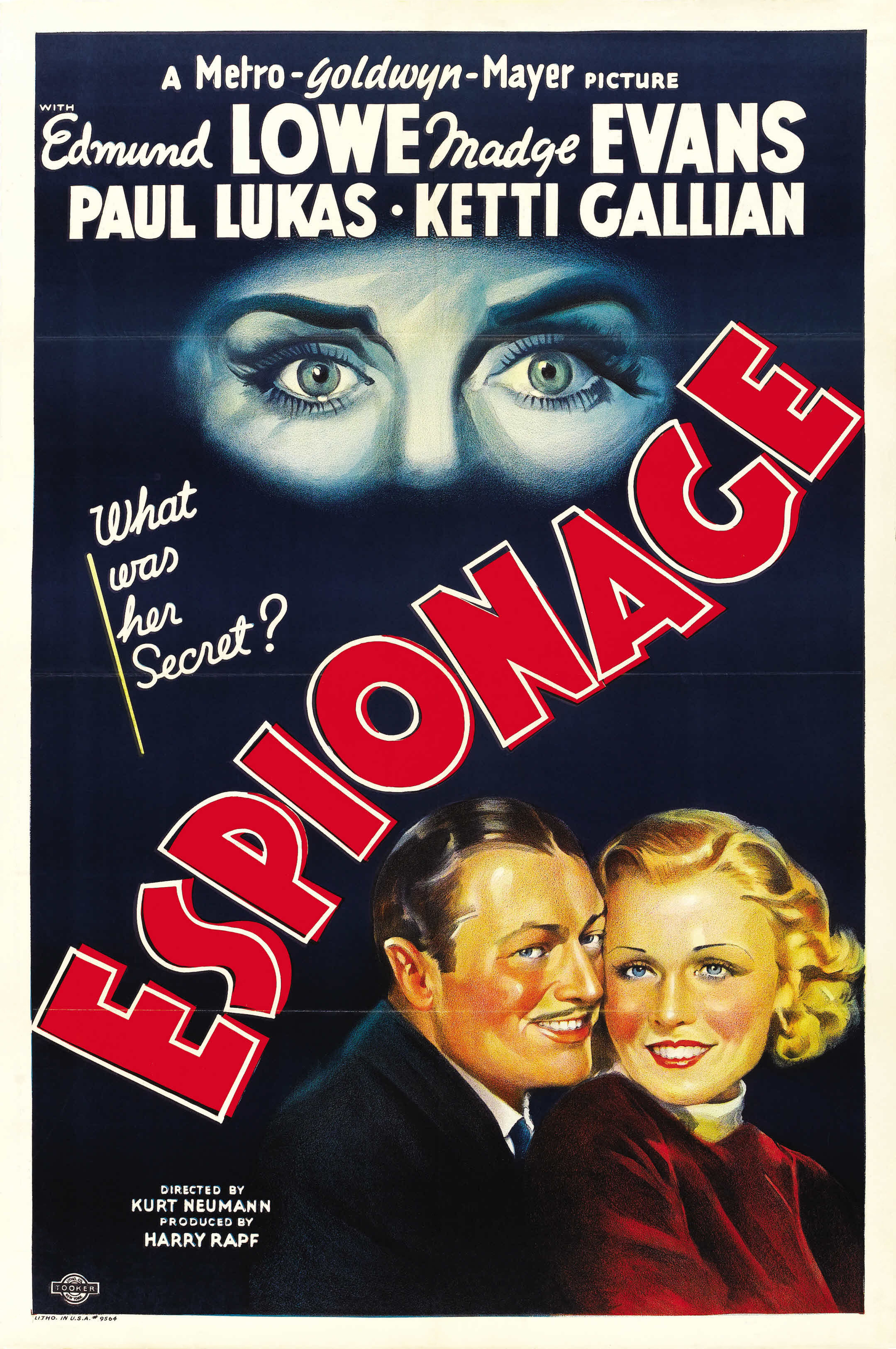
- Theatrical release poster
- Directed by: Kurt Neumann
- Screenplay by: Leonard Lee; Ainsworth Morgan; Manuel Seff
- Based on: Espionage by Walter Hackett
- Produced by: Harry Rapf
- Starring: Edmund Lowe; Madge Evans; Paul Lukas; Ketti Gallian; Richard "Skeets" Gallagher; Frank Reicher
- Cinematography: Ray June
- Edited by: W. Donn Hayes
- Music by: William Axt
- Production company: Metro-Goldwyn-Mayer
- Distributed by: Loew's Inc.
- Release date: February 26, 1937
- Running time: 67 minutes
- Country: United States
- Language: English

Espionage is a 1937 American Proto-Noir, spy-film, adventure, drama, romance, comedy thriller film directed by Kurt Neumann and written by Leonard Lee, Ainsworth Morgan and Manuel Seff, based on the 1935 West End play Espionage by Walter Hackett. The film stars Edmund Lowe, Madge Evans, Paul Lukas, Ketti Gallian, Richard "Skeets" Gallagher, and Frank Reicher. The film was released February 26, 1937, by Metro-Goldwyn-Mayer.

== Plot ==
A smart-aleck mystery novelist agrees to board the Orient Express to get the goods on an arms dealer for a newspaper editor pal. But when his passport is lifted by a pickpocket, he finds himself forced to pose as the husband of passenger Booth, unaware that she's a reporter who's also on Kronsky's trail.

== Cast ==
- Edmund Lowe as Kenneth Stevens
- Madge Evans as Patricia Booth
- Paul Lukas as Anton Kronsky
- Ketti Gallian as Sonia Yaloniv
- Richard "Skeets" Gallagher as Jimmy Brown
- Frank Reicher as Von Cram
- Billy Gilbert as Turk (billed as William Gilbert)
- Robert Graves as Duval
- Leonid Kinskey as Maxie Burgos
- Mitchell Lewis as Sondheim
- Charles Trowbridge as Doyle
- Barnett Parker as Bill Cordell
- Nita Pike as Fleurette
- Juan Torena as South American
- George Sorel as Maitre d'Hotel
- Gaston Glass as La Forge
- Egon Brecher as Chief of Police
- Leo White as Barber (uncredited)
- Russell Hicks as Alfred Hartrix (uncredited)
- Gino Corrado as Bandleader (uncredited)
- Ann Rutherford as Train Passenger (uncredited)
