= Mr. Todd's Experiment =

Play by Walter C. Hackett

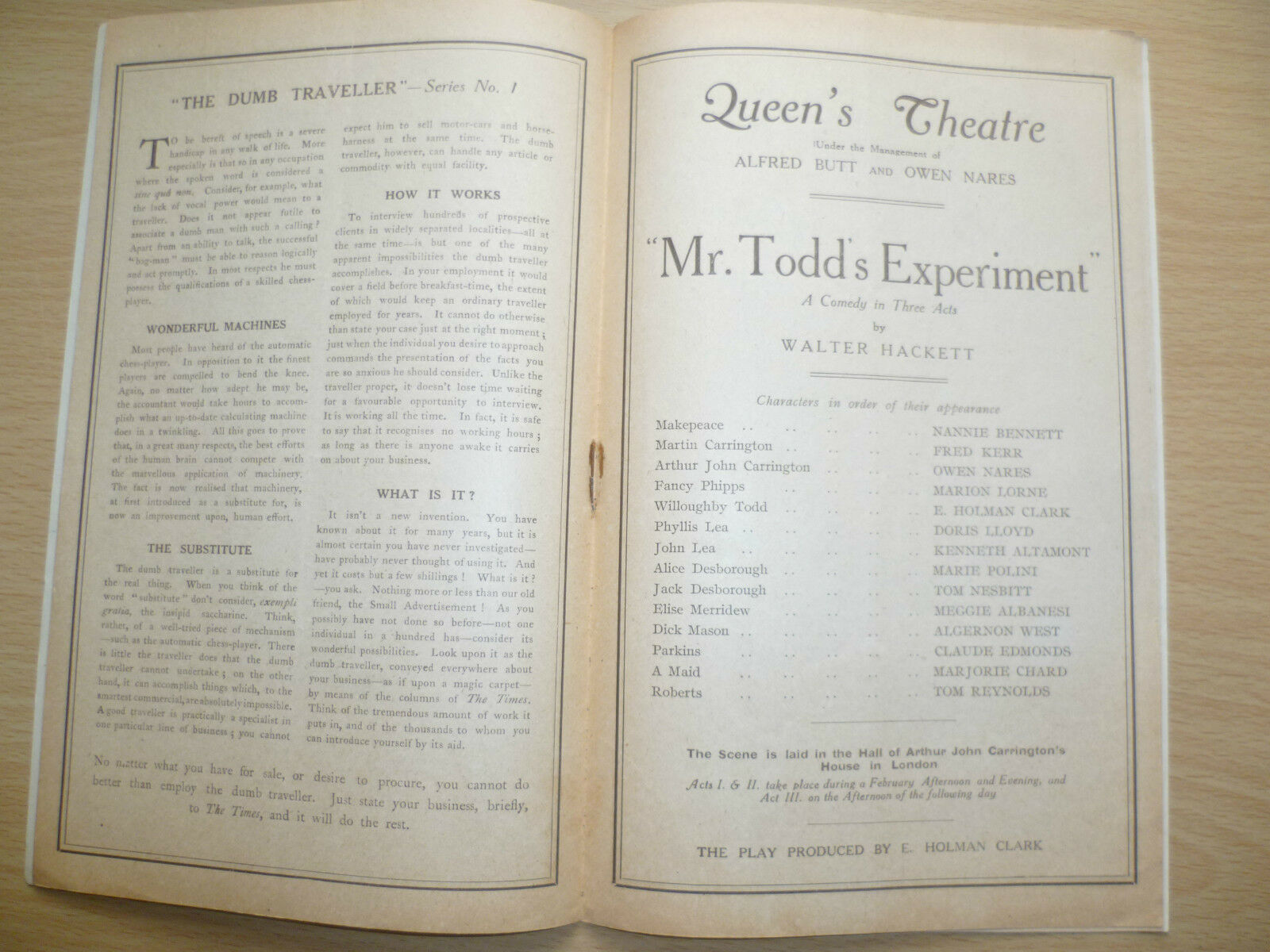
- Written by: Walter Hackett
- Original language: English
- Genre: Comedy

Premiere
- Date premiered: 30 January 1920
- Place premiered: Queen's Theatre, London

Mr. Todd's Experiment is a 1920 comedy play by Walter Hackett.

It ran for 67 performances at the Queen's Theatre in London's West End. The original cast included Owen Nares, Fred Kerr, Meggie Albanesi, Doris Lloyd, Marion Lorne, E. Holman Clark and Tom Reynolds.

== Bibliography ==
- Wearing, J.P. The London Stage 1920–1929: A Calendar of Productions, Performers, and Personnel. Rowman & Littlefield, 2014.
