= Afterwards (play) =

Play by Walter Hackett

- Written by: Walter Hackett
- Original language: English
- Genre: Mystery

Premiere
- Date premiered: 7 November 1933
- Place premiered: Whitehall Theatre

Afterwards is a 1933 mystery play by the British-American writer Walter Hackett revolving around a psychic medium.

It enjoyed a West End run of 208 performances at the Whitehall Theatre between 7 November 1933 and 12 June 1934. The original London cast included Gordon Harker, Henry Daniell, Ronald Shiner, Jeanne Stuart and Marion Lorne.

== Adaptation ==
It was adapted into the 1934 Hollywood film Their Big Moment directed by James Cruze and starring Zasu Pitts.

== Bibliography ==
- Goble, Alan. The Complete Index to Literary Sources in Film. Walter de Gruyter, 1999.
- Wearing, J.P. The London Stage 1930-1939: A Calendar of Productions, Performers, and Personnel. Rowman & Littlefield, 2014.
