= Take a Chance (play) =

Play by Walter Hackett

- Original language: English
- Written by: Walter Hackett
- Genre: Comedy

Premiere
- Date: 28 July 1931
- Place: Whitehall Theatre

Take a Chance is a comedy play by the British-American writer Walter Hackett, with a plot revolving around gambling on a horseracing.

It was performed at the Whitehall Theatre, running for 93 performances between 28 July and 17 October 1931. It followed closely on the heels of another of Hackett's plays at the theatre Good Losers. The original cast of Take a Chance included Ian Hunter, Ronald Shiner, Charles Quatermaine, Anthony Holles, Francis Lister, Hugh Wakefield, Barbara Hoffe and Marion Lorne.

== Adaptation ==
It provided the basis for a loose adaptation into the 1937 film of the same title directed by Sinclair Hill and starring Claude Hulbert and Binnie Hale.

== Bibliography ==
- Goble, Alan. The Complete Index to Literary Sources in Film. Walter de Gruyter, 1999.
- Wearing, J.P. The London Stage 1930-1939: A Calendar of Productions, Performers, and Personnel. Rowman & Littlefield, 2014.
