= Their Big Moment =

1934 American film directed by James Cruze

- Directed by: James Cruze; Charles Kerr (assistant)
- Screenplay by: Arthur Caesar; Marion Dix
- Based on: Afterwards; 1933 play by Walter Hackett
- Produced by: Pandro S. Berman; Cliff Reid
- Starring: ZaSu Pitts; Slim Summerville; Kay Johnson
- Cinematography: Harold Wenstrom
- Edited by: William Hamilton
- Music by: Max Steiner
- Production company: RKO Radio Pictures
- Distributed by: RKO Radio Pictures
- Release date: August 17, 1934 (US)
- Running time: 68 minutes
- Country: United States
- Language: English

Their Big Moment is a 1934 American mystery film directed by James Cruze, from a screenplay by Arthur Caesar and Marion Dix. The film starred ZaSu Pitts and Slim Summerville. It is based on the 1933 West End play Afterwards by Walter Hackett which had run for more than two hundred performances in London. While most of the Pitts-Summerville teamings were comedies, this was a serious drama in which they merely played comic-relief characters; their star billing was thus misleading.

== Plot ==
Tillie Whim, a timid stage assistant to The Great La Salle in a small mentalist act playing a Vaudeville theater, is harassed, bullied, and undermined by the act's co-star, primadonna Lottie. When Lottie finally attempts to fire Tillie after a performance, La Salle fires Lottie instead.

The remaining troupe are then hired backstage by an audience member to debunk another mentalist, whom he accuses of exploiting his friend, a grief-stricken woman who has recently lost her husband in a plane crash. Tillie is promoted to Lottie's old role as medium, but unexpectedly deviates from the script when the spirit of the departed tells her that the plane crash was murder.

== Cast ==
- Zasu Pitts as Tillie Whim
- Slim Summerville as Bill Ambrose
- William Gaxton as The Great La Salle
- Bruce Cabot as Lane Franklyn
- Kay Johnson as Eve Farrington
- Julie Haydon as Fay Harley
- Ralph Morgan as Dr. Portman
- Huntley Gordon as John Farrington
- Tamara Geva as Lottie
