= The Gay Adventure =

1936 film

- Feature on the film from Picture Show (14 November 1936)
- Directed by: Sinclair Hill
- Written by: D.B. Wyndham-Lewis
- Based on: The Gay Adventure by Walter Hackett
- Produced by: Harcourt Templeman
- Starring: Yvonne Arnaud; Barry Jones; Nora Swinburne; Finlay Currie
- Cinematography: Cyril Bristow
- Edited by: Max Brenner
- Production company: Grosvenor Films
- Distributed by: Pathé Pictures International
- Release date: 20 July 1936
- Running time: 74 minutes
- Country: United Kingdom
- Language: English

The Gay Adventure is a 1936 British comedy film directed by Sinclair Hill and starring Yvonne Arnaud, Barry Jones and Nora Swinburne. It was written by D.B. Wyndham-Lewis based on the 1931 play of the same name by Walter Hackett, and was made at Welwyn Studios by the independent company Grosvenor Films.

== Synopsis ==
American confidence trickster Porter convinces timid Mr. Darnton that he is descended from Alexandre Dumas's hero D'Artagnan, leading to farcial swashbuckling adventures.

== Cast ==
- Yvonne Arnaud as Julie
- Barry Jones as Darnton
- Nora Swinburne as Fay d'Allary
- Betty Worth as Baby
- Sybil Grove as Miss Darnton
- Finlay Currie as Porter
- Guy Middleton as Aram
- Robert Holmes as d'Allary
- Anthony Holles as Charles
- Kenneth Warrington as Mickey Blane
- Ralph Truman as Buck
- Percy Parsons as Pete
- Andreas Malandrinos as hotel manager

== Reception ==
The Daily Film Renter wrote: "The plot is a fairly tangled one, but the chief entertainment values derive from the piquant performance of Yvonne Arnaud, whose delightful accent is always a joy. ... Barry Jones is pleasant as the heroic Darnton, even though his crass stupidity does seem a trifle far-fetched, even for farce."

Picture Show wrote: "Yvonne Arnaud is amusing as the French girl with whom the little man falls in love, and Barry Jones as the hero is a delight. The opening sequences are a little confusing, but once the comedy gets into its stride it provides good fun."
