= Lillian Burkhart Goldsmith =

Vaudeville performer, clubwoman, and businesswoman

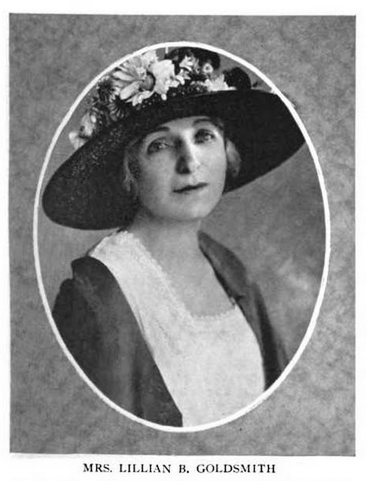
- Lillian Burkhart Goldsmith, in a 1922 publication
- Born: February 8, 1871; Allegheny, Pennsylvania
- Died: February 25, 1958 (aged 87)
- Occupation(s): Vaudeville performer, clubwoman, and businesswoman
- Spouses: Charles Dickson (m. 1891); George Goldsmith (m. 1903, d. 1928)
- Children: Rosalie Faith Goldsmith

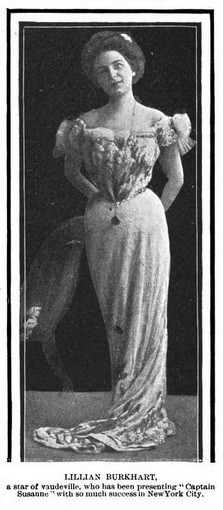
Lillian Burkhart, from a 1901 publication.

Lillian Burkhart Goldsmith (February 8, 1871 – February 25, 1958) was an American vaudeville performer, clubwoman, and businesswoman, based in Los Angeles.

== Early life ==
Lillian Burkhart was born in Allegheny, Pennsylvania, the daughter of Adolph Burkhart and Rosalie Cirker Burkhart. Her parents were both Jewish immigrants: her father was born in Russia, and her mother was born in Germany. Lillian trained as a teacher in the Pittsburgh area.

== Career ==
In her early years, Lillian Burkhart produced and performed in more than two dozen one-act sketches, and was remembered as "the foremost comedienne in vaudeville". After she married her second husband and moved to California, she continued giving recitations and dramatic readings, often for community groups, and she produced "municipal pageants" and theatrical events, including a benefit show for the victims of the 1906 San Francisco earthquake, and the Los Angeles pageant marking Shakespeare's tercentenary.

In Los Angeles she was an officer of the Ebell Club, the founder and first president of the Philanthropy and Civics Club (beginning in 1919), and the president of the Los Angeles chapter of the National Council of Jewish Women (from 1924 to 1930). She developed a successful career of buying and improving property in the growing city, and funded the building of clubhouses for several of philanthropic organizations. She established the first Girl Scout Council in Los Angeles, and was its first commissioner. She began and funded the Lillian Burkhart Fund, which supported college scholarships for disadvantaged students.

Lillian Burkhart Goldsmith lectured against prohibition. She was monitored and questioned by the U. S. Justice Department during World War I, because her mother was German and because she gave a lecture, "What the World is Thinking and Feeling", which was perceived as possibly influencing clubwomen against the American war effort.

== Personal life ==
Lillian Burkhart was married to a fellow vaudeville performer, Charles Dickson, in 1891; the couple appeared in shows together. She married George Goldsmith in 1903. They had a daughter, Rosalie Faith Goldsmith, born in 1904. Lillian was widowed in 1928, and died in 1958, aged 87 years.
