= Hyde Park Corner (shopping centre) =

Shopping centre in Johannesburg, South Africa

- Location: Johannesburg, South Africa
- Coordinates: 26.125°S 28.0333°E
- Opened: November 1969
- Architect: Murray & Roberts Construction
- Website: www.hydeparkshopping.co.za

Hyde Park Corner is a shopping centre in Johannesburg, South Africa.

It is located in Hyde Park at the major intersection of Jan Smuts Avenue and William Nicol Drive. It was completed in November 1969 and built by Murray & Roberts Construction, now renamed Concor.
