= Hyde Park Corner (film) =

1935 film

- Directed by: Sinclair Hill
- Written by: D. B. Wyndham-Lewis; Selwyn Jepson
- Based on: Hyde Park Corner by Walter Hackett
- Produced by: Harcourt Templeman
- Starring: Gordon Harker; Binnie Hale; Eric Portman; Gibb McLaughlin
- Cinematography: Cyril Bristow
- Edited by: Michael Hankinson
- Music by: Louis Levy
- Production company: Grosvenor Films
- Distributed by: Pathé Pictures International
- Release date: 22 November 1935
- Running time: 85 minutes
- Country: United Kingdom
- Language: English

Hyde Park Corner is a 1935 British comedy crime film, directed by Sinclair Hill and starring Gordon Harker, Binnie Hale and Eric Portman. It was written by D. B. Wyndham-Lewis and Selwyn Jepson based on the 1934 play Hyde Park Corner by Walter Hackett. The film was made at Welwyn Studios.

Harker portrays a policeman investigating a crime in 1930s London, which proves to have its origins in the 1780s. The film takes its name from Hyde Park Corner in Central London where the events of the film occur.

== Plot ==
In the 1780s, after an evening of illegal gambling, two of the participants fight a duel in which the wronged party is killed by a villain, who has just cheated to win a newly built house at Hyde Park Corner from him. Officer Cheatle of the Bow Street Runners is able to arrest those present for gambling, but is unable to prove that a murder has occurred.

A hundred and fifty years later, the Officer's great-grandson, Constable Cheatle, is intrigued by reports of another murder at the same house at Hyde Park Corner. Cheatle sees this as a way of fulfilling his ambition to join the plainclothes detective branch. His attempts to solve the case are initially interrupted by Sophie, a petty criminal whom he arrests while she is shoplifting in a department store. Eventually, with her help, he is able to uncover the true culprit of the crime that has its roots in the fatal evening in the eighteenth century.

== Cast ==
- Gordon Harker as Constable Cheatle / Officer Cheatle
- Binnie Hale as Sophie
- Eric Portman as Edward Chester
- Gibb McLaughlin as Sir Arthur Gannett
- Harry Tate as taxi driver
- Robert Holmes as Concannon
- Eileen Peel as Barbara Ainsworth
- Donald Wolfit as Howard

== Reception ==
The Monthly Film Bulletin wrote: "The direction is uneven, very good in some parts and much less so in others. The first part, which is noteworthy for beautiful settings and charming costumes, is inclined to drag. ... The acting is, on the whole, colourless; the exceptions are Gordon Harker and Binnie Hale. The former is inimitable, thoroughly amusing at times and the cause of frequent laughter. It is a pity that his part is conceived entirely as a caricature with no allowance for more subtle characterisation. Binnie Hale works hard, is vivacious, and looks charming, but she has inadequate scope."

Kine Weekly wrote: "The story, which good theatre, wraps the conventional in the picturesque and has in its two phases, the period and the present day, continuity of purpose that strikes an original note. The comedy angle is effectively put over by Gordon Harker and Binnie Hale, a first-rate team, while the thrills even if not quite so clearly emphasised, provide effective contrast and equable balance. The film, which gets out of the rut without losing the common touch, combines good general entertainment with attractive star and title values."

The Daily Film Renter wrote: "It is all very involved, while indifferent continuity does not help matters. Direction is undistinguished, photography mediocre, and dialogue poor. ... The picture stands or falls by the work of Gordon Harker, who plays both Cheatle and his forebear, a Bow Street Runner. The comedian struggles hard to infuse life into a basically unconvincing role."
