= Sally (1957 TV series) =

- Genre: Situation comedy
- Starring: Joan Caulfield; Marion Lorne; Gale Gordon; Arte Johnson; Johnny Desmond
- Country of origin: United States
- Original language: English
- No. of seasons: 1
- No. of episodes: 26

Production
- Producer: Frank Ross
- Running time: 22–24 mins.
- Production company: Caulross/Paramount Television

Original release
- Network: NBC
- Release: September 15, 1957 – March 30, 1958

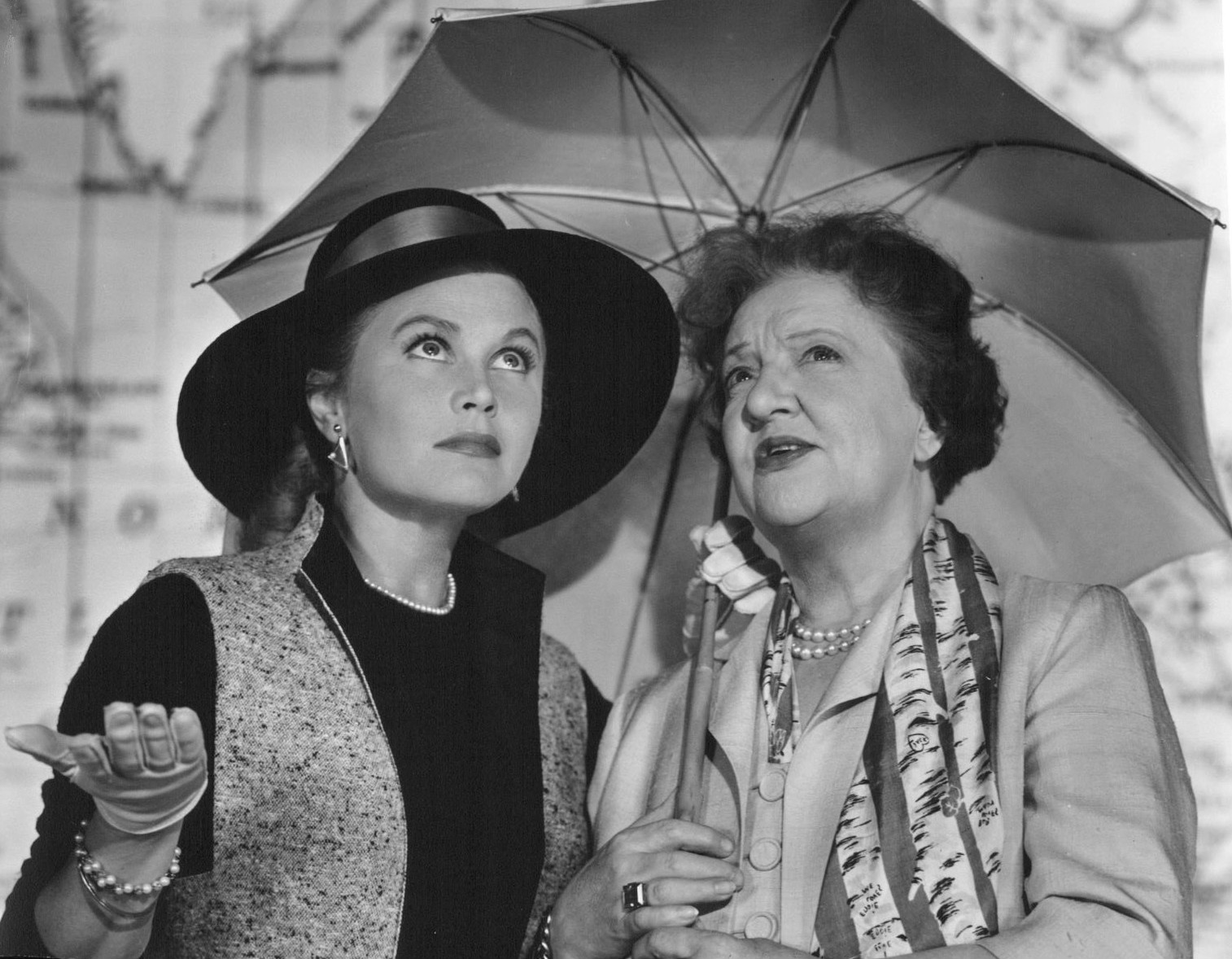
Joan Caulfield (left) as Sally Truesdale and Marion Lorne as Myrtle Banford in Sally.

Sally is an American sitcom that aired on NBC during the 1957–58 television season. The series stars Joan Caulfield as Sally Truesdale, a young saleswoman at a department store who tours Europe with a widow who is the store's wealthy and scatter-brained owner. After the trip is over, Sally returns to work at the store.

== Synopsis ==
Sally Truesdale is a young salesclerk at the Banford & Bleacher Department Store and eligible bachelorette who is reassigned to serve as the traveling companion of the store's wealthy co-owner, the matronly widow Myrtle Banford, during a lengthy trip to Europe. They expect a normal vacation, but Mrs. Banford is eccentric and can be a little daffy, and as the two women travel from city to city, she tends to get into various kinds of trouble, while the fun-loving Sally also is prone to having exciting adventures.

In mid-February 1958, the two women return home, and Sally resumes work as a salesclerk at the Banford & Bleacher Department Store, located in an unidentified large city somewhere in the United States. Working with her at the store in addition to Mrs. Banford are store manager and part-owner Bascomb Bleacher, Sr., his lovable but incompetent son Bascomb Bleacher, Jr., and Jim Kendall, an artist who works in the store's advertising department and becomes Sally's boyfriend.

== Cast ==
- Joan Caulfield as Sally Truesdale
- Marion Lorne as Mrs. Myrtle Banford
- Gale Gordon as Bascomb Bleacher, Sr. (1958)
- Arte Johnson as Bascomb Bleacher, Jr. (1958)
- Johnny Desmond as Jim Kendall (1958)

== Production ==
A Caulross/Paramount Television production, Sally was the first filmed series produced by Paramount Television. Joan Caulfield's husband, movie producer Frank Ross, served as producer for the series; it was his first television production. The series included a laugh track.

== Reception ==
After the September 15, 1957, premiere of Sally, Ann Wardell Saunders wrote that the first episode was "too contrived and unrealistic for an adult audience, unless it were given a mid-Victorian setting." As episodes aired over the next two months, it became apparent that viewers found the plots of Sally's and Mrs. Banford's adventures in Europe far-fetched and the constant presence of Caulfield and Marion Lorne without other regular cast members monotonous. Moreover, few American viewers could identify with the wealth, glamorous wardrobes, globe-trotting travel, and international situations depicted in the series. Hollywood reporter Bob Thomas wrote in an October 19, 1957 article, "Judging from last week's program [the "Only in Paris" episode of October 13, 1957], it [Sally] appears to be one of the brighter spots in an otherwise dismal season. It had crisp writing, bright direction and sharp acting by Marion Lorne...and other accomplished actors." However, critics often expressed negative opinions of Sally.

Caulfield at first struck a defiant tone toward criticism and low viewership, saying in mid-October 1957, "If people don't like our show, they just don't have taste. I'm a tough audience. I've done some shows that make me cringe. But some of the Sally shows have made me real proud." Faced with stiff competition from Maverick on ABC and The Jack Benny Program on CBS, however, Sally continued to draw low ratings, to Caulfield's surprise; she told the press, "And to think, we picked the 7:30 time spot ourselves, thinking it'd be a cinch to lick a little old western. Maybe we should have looked into a crystal ball." By the end of November 1957, she was promising changes, with Sally returning to the United States to work in a department store, wearing plainer clothes, and having a steady romantic interest. She also said that scripts would change to reflect broad comedy, and a man would be introduced into Mrs. Banford's life.

Due to Sally′s low ratings, NBC was considering its cancellation by mid-December 1957. On February 8, 1958, an article by Bob de Piante in the Oneonta Star described Sally as "one of the most miserable flops of the current TV season." However, in describing the cast and premise changes Caulfield had promised, which were to roll out in the upcoming February 16 episode, he gave the revamped show a qualified endorsement, writing that Sally′s future was uncertain and that "if NBC is planning the new format just to satisfy a disgruntled sponsor, then the show will end up by the wayside," but adding: "If, however, the network is trying to make an honest change, Sally has the potential of being a top half-hour of entertainment."

NBC promoted the February 16, 1958, broadcast of the first episode of Sally with its new premise and cast it as a "premiere" of the revamped show. However, the changes did not save Sally. In The Philadelphia Inquirer on February 20, 1958, features writer Harry Harris described the overhaul of the show as "frantic but not very amusing" and said that Sally "seems certain to go down the drain." The show lasted only seven episodes with its new premise and cast.

Despite Sally′s failure, Marion Lorne was nominated in 1958 for the Primetime Emmy Award for Outstanding Supporting Actress in a Comedy Series for her portrayal of Myrtle Banford. She lost to Ann B. Davis, who received the award for her work on The Bob Cummings Show.

Caulfield separated from Ross in 1959 and divorced him in 1960. She blamed the end of their marriage on the stress of working together on Sally.

== Broadcast history ==
Sally premiered on NBC on September 15, 1957. It lasted only a single season, and its last episode aired on March 30, 1958. It was broadcast at 7:30 p.m. Eastern Time on Sundays throughout its 26-episode run.

== Episodes ==
No.	Title	Directed by	Written by	Original release date
1	"Sally"	William Asher	Phil Shuken	September 15, 1957
Sally meets Mrs. Banford in the series pilot for Sally. While working as a salesclerk at the Banford & Bleacher Department Store, Sally Truesdale mistakes the scatter-brained Myrtle Banford for a penniless shoplifter. Eventually, Sally learns that Mrs. Banford is a rich widow and the co-owner of the store, and that she is looking for a travelling companion for a trip to Europe. Sally agrees to accompany her, and two women set off on their European travels.
2	"Sally Tries to Say No"	Unknown	Unknown	September 22, 1957
While Sally and Mrs. Banford are aboard an ocean liner, Sally meets an attractive man. She dislikes him at first — but warms up to him during the voyage.
3	"To Myrtle With Love"	William Asher	Phillip Shuken	September 29, 1957
Alternative title "Mrs. Banford's Birthday." Sally and Mrs. Banford are visiting Paris on Mrs. Banford's birthday, and as a present Sally hires a dashing French gigolo, Messeur Coucheau, to escort Mrs. Banford for a night, thinking that it will make her feel young again. When he keeps reappearing to court Mrs. Banford, however, Sally realizes that he actually is not interested in Mrs. Banford — he wants romance with Sally. Guest stars: Francis Lederer, Alphonse Martell, Fred Cavens, and Maurice Marsac.
4	"Free Thinkers"	Unknown	Unknown	October 6, 1957
Sally and Mrs. Banford visit a phony existentialist den to rescue a rich young American from its clutches.
5	"Only in Paris"	William Asher	Phil Shuken	October 13, 1957
In Paris, Sally and Mrs. Banford meet a shy, bumbling man named George and try to build up his confidence. Guest star: Robert Sweeney
6	"Monte Carlo"	Unknown	Unknown	October 20, 1957
While visiting Monte Carlo, Sally pretends to be an incurable gambler as a way of meeting a handsome psychiatrist who she thinks can get her an invitation to a gala ball for Prince Rainier and Princess Grace of Monaco.
7	"Sally Meets Humberto"	Unknown	Unknown	October 27, 1957
In Italy, eight-year-old Humberto kidnaps Sally and Mrs. Banford because he wants them to hire him as their guide. Guest stars: Barry Gordon, Henry Corden, and Hope Summers.
8	"When in Rome"	Unknown	Unknown	November 3, 1957
Sally and Mrs. Banford discover an abandoned infant at their hotel room door in Rome.
9	"Sally Meets the Grand Duke"	Unknown	Unknown	November 10, 1957
While on the Riviera, Sally meets an elegant-looking man who claims to be a plumber, but she suspects that he is more than just an ordinary plumber. She turns out to be right: He is a grand duke. Guest star: John Abbott
10	"Sally vs. the Prince"	William Asher	Phil Shuken	November 17, 1957
Aboard an ocean liner, Sally and Mrs. Banford become involved with an arrogant 10-year-old Arabian prince whose life is threatened.
11	"Sally and the Sheikh"	William Asher	Phil Shuken	December 1, 1957
A sheikh kidnaps Sally because he wants her for his harem.
12	"Sally and Lady Wingate"	Unknown	Unknown	December 8, 1957
Sally acts as a maid and Mrs. Banford as a cook to help their friend Lady Wingate sell her ancestral castle.
13	"Presenting Miss Truesdale"	Unknown	Unknown	December 22, 1957
Mrs. Banford makes sacrifices so that Sally can be presented at Buckingham Palace.
14	"The Winning of the Green"	Unknown	Unknown	December 29, 1957
While visiting Ireland, Mrs. Banford tries to make peace between two of her relatives who are enemies of one another.
15	"Sally and the Actor"	Unknown	Unknown	January 5, 1958
Sally's plans to help a stranded actor hit a snag.
16	"Sally vs. Feudalism"	Unknown	Unknown	January 12, 1958
A waiter takes a tip meant for a busboy.
17	"Look Hans, No Sally"	Unknown	Unknown	January 19, 1958
After Sally and Mrs. Banford check into a Swiss chalet owned by the parents of a former college exchange student friend, Sally becomes the key figure in a romantic triangle.
18	"Operation Intrigue"	William Asher	Irving Elinson & Robert O'Brien	January 26, 1958
While traveling in West Germany along the border with East Germany, Sally and Mrs. Banford become suspicious of a man they believe is following them. They become convinced that he is a Soviet spy and decide to expose him.
19	"World's Greatest Lover"	Unknown	Unknown	February 2, 1958
While visiting Capri, Sally meets a handsome count. He asks her out on a date, but he has a reputation as a playboy, and all her friends advise her not to go. Sally has to decide whether or not to continue her relationship with him — and deflates the ego of the self-proclaimed "world's greatest lover."
20	"Sally Comes Home"	Unknown	Unknown	February 16, 1958
Sally and Mrs. Banford return home from their lengthy European trip, and Sally goes back to her job as a salesclerk at the Banford & Bleacher Department Store.
21	"Coffee Break"	Unknown	Unknown	February 23, 1958
Bascomb Bleacher, Jr., opposes coffee breaks, and Sally loses her job when she institutes a "floating" coffee break at the department store.
22	"Surprise, Surprise"	Unknown	Unknown	March 2, 1958
The department store's staff plans a surprise party for Sally, but Mr. Bleacher thinks the party is for him.
23	"Sally, the Comestician"	William Asher	Irving Elinson & Robet O'Brien	March 9, 1958
Sally decides that the department store would be more profitable if it made its own cosmetics, so she and Mrs. Banford use Sally′s bathtub to make Plum da Vie ("Plum of Life"), a new face cream made out of plums to sell at the store. Sally then works with Jim on an advertising campaign for Plum da Vie, in which Sally pretends to be the actress and singer Judy Holliday on the store's television show. Viewers fall for it, and Plum da Vie is a huge success — until a long line of women appear at the store demanding their money back because Plum da Vie does not work. (When Joan Caulfield in character as Sally provides a sneak peek at next week's show at the end of the episode, the background music is identical to the theme music for The Donna Reed Show, which premiered the following season.)
24	"The Rival"	Unknown	Unknown	March 16, 1958
When a beautiful vamp descends upon the store, Sally tries to get her moved elsewhere.
25	"Sally, the Love Doctor"	William Asher	Alan Lipscott and Robert Fisher	March 23, 1958
Sally discovers that Bascomb Bleacher, Jr., plans to go to Tibet and become a Tibetan monk because he does not have the courage to ask a woman to marry him, so she convinces him to stay and decides to help him become more confident around women. Guest star: Carol Nugent.
26	"Dear Myrtle"	William Asher	Phil Davis & Phil Shuken	March 30, 1958
An orphanage for which Mrs. Banford is a patron is in financial trouble, so as a benefit event for the orphans Sally organizes a musical show put on by the employees of the department store.
