= The Barton Mystery (1932 film) =

1932 British film by Henry Edwards

- Ursula Jeans and Ion Swinley in the film
- Directed by: Henry Edwards
- Based on: The Barton Mystery by Walter Hackett
- Produced by: Herbert Wilcox
- Starring: Ursula Jeans; Ellis Jeffreys; Lyn Harding
- Production company: British and Dominions
- Distributed by: Paramount British Pictures
- Release date: November 1932
- Running time: 76 minutes
- Country: United Kingdom
- Language: English

The Barton Mystery is a 1932 British crime film directed by Henry Edwards and starring Ursula Jeans, Ellis Jeffreys and Lyn Harding. It was written by Walter Hackett based on his 1916 play The Barton Mystery.

== Preservation status ==
The British Film Institute National Archive holds a collection of ephemera and stills but no film or video materials.

== Plot ==
Harry Maitland visits philanderer Gerald Barton, intent on obtaining compromising letters written to him by a woman, but fails. The next day he receives the letters, and a covering note from Barton. Barton is then found murdered, and Maitland is arrested and found guilty. Beverly, a clairvoyant – and charlatan – is employed to use his "psychic powers" to solve the murder, which by luck and bluff he does, and Maitland is reprieved.

== Cast ==
- Ursula Jeans as Ethel Standish
- Ellis Jeffreys as Lady Marshall
- Lyn Harding as Beverly
- Ion Swinley as Richard Standish
- Wendy Barrie as Phyllis Grey
- Joyce Bland as Helen Barton
- Tom Helmore as Harry Maitland
- O. B. Clarence as Sir Everard Marshall
- Franklyn Bellamy as Gerald Barton
- Wilfred Noy as Griffiths

== Production ==
The film was made at British and Dominions Studios, Elstree, as a quota quickie for release by Paramount Pictures.

== Reception ==
Film Weekly wrote: "Thin and unbelievable murder mystery, devoid of the necessary element of suspense and with ridiculous slices of broad farce interpolated. Everybody concerned with The Barton Mystery must take a share of the blame for a poor production. The story is weak in the extreme, and not one of those involved in the unravelling of what plot there is does anything to help by his or her acting, which is without depth of feeling."

Kine Weekly wrote: "The story is ingeniously constructed, but the development is too leisurely for suspense to be built up with full dramatic effect, and the continuity is uneven. However, a strong and amusing performance by Lyn Harding, as a charlatan, helps to hold the loose ends firmly together and make the film a useful supporting attraction."

Picturegoer wrote: "Slow development and rather ragged continuity militate against the effect of an otherwise ingeniously constructed and strongly dramatic story."
