= The Barton Mystery (play) =

1916 play by Walter C. Hackett

The Barton Mystery is a play in three acts and an epilogue by Walter Hackett. The play mixes elements of a whodunit detective mystery with farce.

== Performance history ==
The Barton Mystery was first performed at the Savoy Theatre in London where it opened on March 22, 1916. It ran there for 165 performances. The cast included Henry V. Esmond as parliament member Richard Standish, E. Holman Clark as Sir Everard Marshall, Geoffrey Wilmer as Harry Maitland, Jessie Winter as Ethel Standish, James Lindsay as Dennis O'Meara, Hilda Bayley as Phyllis Grey, Marie Illington as Lady Marshall, Miss Darragh as Helen Barton, Psyche Le Mesurier as the Maid, and Harry Brodribb Irving as Beverley. The character Beverley is a psychic medium, and an article in The Theosophist described the play "as being remarkable, if only for the fact it is the first in which psychic research has been introduced seriously on the English stage."

In 1917 it was staged on Broadway at the Comedy Theatre. Its run in New York was less successful and it closed after just twenty shows.

== Adaptations ==
The Barton Mystery has been turned into three films:

- The Barton Mystery, a 1920 silent British film
- The Barton Mystery, a 1932 British film
- The Barton Mystery, a 1949 French film

== Bibliography ==
- Lachman, Marvin (2014). The Villainous Stage: Crime Plays on Broadway and in the West End. McFarland & Company. ISBN 9780786495344.
- Wearing, John Peter (2014). The London Stage 1910–1919: A Calendar of Productions, Performers, and Personnel. Rowman & Littlefield. ISBN 9780810893009.
