= 1925 in film =

This is an overview of 1925 in film, including significant events, a list of films released and notable births and deaths.

== Top-grossing films (U.S.) ==
The top ten 1925 released films by box office gross in North America are as follows:

Highest-grossing films of 1925
Rank	Title	Distributor	Domestic rentals
1	The Big Parade	MGM	$4,990,000
2	Ben-Hur: A Tale of the Christ	MGM	$4,359,000
3	The Freshman	Pathé Exchange	$2,600,000
4	The Gold Rush	United Artists	$2,150,000
5	The Phantom of the Opera	Universal	$1,550,000
6	Don Q, Son of Zorro	United Artists	$1,500,000
6	Stella Dallas	United Artists	$1,500,000
8	The Lost World	First National	$1,300,000
9	Little Annie Rooney	United Artists	$1,100,000
9	East Lynne	Fox Film	$1,100,000
9	The Merry Widow	MGM	$1,100,000

== Events ==
- June 26: Charlie Chaplin's The Gold Rush premieres. It is voted the best film of the year by critics in The Film Daily annual poll
- September 25: Ufa-Palast am Zoo in Berlin rebuilt as Germany's largest cinema reopens.
- November 5: MGM's war drama film The Big Parade is released. The film was a massive commercial success, surpassing The Birth of a Nation to become the highest-grossing film of all time, up until it was surpassed by Snow White and the Seven Dwarfs in 1938.
- December 30: MGM's biblical epic Ben-Hur: A Tale of the Christ premieres in New York City. It is the most expensive silent film ever made, costing $4 million (around $72 million when adjusted for inflation)
- Hong Shen publishes the film script Mrs. Shentu in the Shanghai magazine Eastern Miscellany. It is never filmed, but is considered a milestone in film history for being the first published film script in China. Hong also directs his first film, Young Master Feng, at Mingxing (Star) Film Company in this year.

== Notable films released in 1925 ==
For the complete list of US film releases for the year, see United States films of 1925

=== A ===
- Ang Pagtitipid, directed by José Nepomuceno – (Philippines)
- Are Parents People?, directed by Malcolm St. Clair, starring Adolphe Menjou

=== B ===
- The Battleship Potemkin (Bronyenosyets Potyomkin), directed by Sergei Eisenstein – (U.S.S.R.)
- The Bells (Le Juif Polonais), directed by and starring Harry Southwell
- Ben-Hur: A Tale of the Christ, directed by Fred Niblo, starring Ramón Novarro, May McAvoy and Francis X. Bushman
- The Big Parade, directed by King Vidor, starring John Gilbert and Renée Adorée
- The Blackguard (Die Prinzessin und der Geiger), directed by Graham Cutts – (GB/Germany)
- Braveheart, directed by Alan Hale Sr., starring Rod La Rocque

=== C ===
- Chess Fever (Shakhmatnaya goryachka), directed by Vsevolod Pudovkin – (U.S.S.R.)
- Chronicles of the Gray House, directed by Arthur von Gerlach, starring Lil Dagover (Germany)
- The Circle, directed by Frank Borzage, starring Eleanor Boardman
- Classified, directed by Alfred Santell, starring Corinne Griffith
- Cobra, directed by Joseph Henabery, starring Rudolph Valentino and Nita Naldi
- Corazón Aymara (Aymara Heart) (lost), directed by Pedro Sambarino – (Bolivia)
- Curses!, directed by William Goodrich (Roscoe "Fatty" Arbuckle) and Grover Jones

=== D ===
- The Dark Angel, directed by George Fitzmaurice, starring Ronald Colman and Vilma Bánky
- Déclassé, directed by Robert G. Vignola, starring Corinne Griffith and Lloyd Hughes
- Dr. Pyckle and Mr. Pryde, directed by Scott Pembroke and Joe Rock, starring Stan Laurel
- Don Q, Son of Zorro, directed by Donald Crisp, starring Douglas Fairbanks and Mary Astor

=== E ===
- The Eagle, directed by Clarence Brown, starring Rudolph Valentino and Vilma Bánky

=== F ===
- The Farmer from Texas (Der Farmer aus Texas), directed by Joe May, starring Lillian Hall-Davis and Willy Fritsch – (Germany)
- Feu Mathias Pascal (The Late Mathias Pascal), directed by Marcel L'Herbier, starring Ivan Mosjoukine – (France)
- Fifty-Fifty (lost), directed by Henri Diamant-Berger, starring Hope Hampton, Lionel Barrymore and Louise Glaum
- The Freshman, directed by Fred C. Newmeyer and Sam Taylor, starring Harold Lloyd

=== G ===
- Go West, starring and directed by Buster Keaton
- The Gold Rush, a Charlie Chaplin film
- The Goose Woman, directed by Clarence Brown, starring Louise Dresser, Jack Pickford and Constance Bennett
- Grass: A Nation's Battle for Life, directed by Merian C. Cooper and Ernest B. Schoedsack
- The Green Archer, a 10-chapter (three chapters exist) serial directed by Spencer Gordon Bennet, starring Allene Ray and Walter Miller, based on the 1923 novel by Edgar Wallace

=== H ===
- The Haunted Honeymoon, directed by Fred Guiol and Ted Wilde, starring Glenn Tryon
- The Heart Breaker, directed by Benjamin Stoloff
- His People, directed by Edward Sloman, starring Rudolph Schildkraut
- His Supreme Moment (lost), directed by George Fitzmaurice, starring Blanche Sweet and Ronald Colman
- El Húsar de la Muerte (The Hussar of Death), starring and directed by Pedro Sienna – (Chile)

=== I ===
- Isn't Life Terrible?, directed by Leo McCarey, starring Charley Chase and Oliver Hardy

=== J ===
- Joyless Street (Die freudlose Gasse), directed by G. W. Pabst, starring Greta Garbo, Werner Krauss and Asta Nielsen – (Germany)

=== K ===
- The King on Main Street, directed by Monta Bell, starring Adolphe Menjou and Bessie Love
- A Kiss For Cinderella, directed by Herbert Brenon, starring Esther Ralston

=== L ===
- The Lady, directed by Frank Borzage, starring Norma Talmadge
- Lady of the Night, directed by Monta Bell, starring Norma Shearer
- Lazybones, directed by Frank Borzage, starring Madge Bellamy, Buck Jones and ZaSu Pitts
- Lady Windermere's Fan, directed by Ernst Lubitsch, starring Ronald Colman and May McAvoy
- Lights of Old Broadway, directed by Monta Bell, starring Marion Davies and Conrad Nagel
- Little Annie Rooney, directed by William Beaudine, starring Mary Pickford and William Haines
- Living Buddhas (Lebende Buddhas) (lost), directed by Paul Wegener, starring Paul Wegener and Asta Nielsen
- The Lost World, directed by Harry O. Hoyt, starring Bessie Love, Lewis Stone and Wallace Beery, based on the 1912 novel by Arthur Conan Doyle
- Lovers in Quarantine, directed by Frank Tuttle, starring Bebe Daniels and Harrison Ford
- The Lucky Horseshoe, directed by John G. Blystone, starring Tom Mix

=== M ===
- Maciste in Hell (Maciste all'inferno), directed by Guido Brignone – (Italy)
- Madame Behave (lost), directed by Scott Sidney, starring Julian Eltinge and Ann Pennington
- Madame Sans-Gêne (lost), directed by Léonce Perret, starring Gloria Swanson
- The Marriage of the Bear (Medvezhya Svadba), directed by Vladimir Gardin and Konstantin Eggert, based on the 1869 novella Lokis by Prosper Mérimée – (U.S.S.R.)
- Master of the House (Du skal ære din hustru), directed by Carl Theodor Dreyer – (Denmark)
- Men and Women (lost), directed by William C. deMille, starring Richard Dix
- The Merry Widow, directed by Erich von Stroheim, starring Mae Murray and John Gilbert
- Miracles of Love, directed by Vicente Salumbides, starring Dimples Cooper – (Philippines)
- Les Misérables, directed by Henri Fescourt – (France)
- The Monster, directed by Roland West, starring Lon Chaney and Johnny Arthur, based on the 1924 play by Crane Wilbur
- The Mystic, directed by Tod Browning, starring Aileen Pringle and Conway Tearle

=== O ===
- Old Clothes, directed by Edward F. Cline, starring Jackie Coogan and Joan Crawford
- Orochi, directed by Buntarō Futagawa, starring Tsumasaburō Bandō – (Japan)

=== P ===
- Pampered Youth (lost), directed by David Smith
- The Phantom of the Moulin-Rouge (Le fantôme du Moulin-Rouge), written and directed by René Clair – (France)
- The Phantom of the Opera, directed by Rupert Julian, starring Lon Chaney, Norman Kerry and Mary Philbin, based on the 1910 novel by Gaston Leroux
- The Plastic Age – directed by Wesley Ruggles, starring Clara Bow and Gilbert Roland
- The Pleasure Garden, directed by Alfred Hitchcock, starring Virginia Valli and Carmelita Geraghty – (GB)
- Prem Sanyas (Die Leuchte Asiens | The Light of Asia), directed by Franz Osten and Himanshu Rai – (Germany/India)
- Pretty Ladies, directed by Monta Bell, starring ZaSu Pitts
- Proud Flesh, directed by King Vidor, starring Eleanor Boardman and Harrison Ford

=== R ===
- The Rag Man, directed by Edward F. Cline, starring Jackie Coogan
- The Rat, directed by Graham Cutts, starring Ivor Novello, Mae Marsh and Isabel Jeans – (GB)
- The Red Head (Poil de Carotte), directed by Julien Duvivier – (France)
- Red Heels (Das Spielzeug von Paris), directed by Michael Curtiz, starring Lili Damita – (Austria)
- Red Hot Tires, directed by Erle C. Kenton, starring Monte Blue and Patsy Ruth Miller
- The Road to Yesterday, directed by Cecil B. DeMille, starring Joseph Schildkraut and William Boyd

=== S ===
- Sally, Irene and Mary directed by Edmund Goulding, starring Constance Bennett, Joan Crawford, Sally O'Neil and William Haines
- Sally of the Sawdust, directed by D. W. Griffith, starring Carol Dempster and W. C. Fields
- Seven Chances, a Buster Keaton film
- Seven Keys to Baldpate (lost), directed by Fred C. Newmeyer, starring Douglas MacLean, based on the 1913 novel by Earl Derr Biggers
- She, directed by Leander de Cordova and G. B. Samuelson, starring Betty Blythe – (GB/Germany)
- Smouldering Fires, directed by Clarence Brown, starring Pauline Frederick and Laura La Plante
- Spook Ranch, directed by Edward Laemmle, starring Hoot Gibson
- Stella Dallas, directed by Henry King, starring Ronald Colman, Belle Bennett and Douglas Fairbanks Jr.
- The Street of Forgotten Men (lost), directed by Herbert Brenon
- Strike (Stachka), directed by Sergei Eisenstein – (U.S.S.R.)
- The Swan, directed by Dimitri Buchowetzki, starring Frances Howard, Adolphe Menjou and Ricardo Cortez

=== T ===
- The Tailor from Torzhok (Zakroyshchik iz Torzhka), directed by Yakov Protazanov – (U.S.S.R.)
- The Third Round, directed by Sidney Morgan, starring Jack Buchanan – (GB)
- Three Weeks in Paris (lost), directed by Roy Del Ruth, starring Matt Moore
- Too Many Kisses, directed by Paul Sloane, starring Richard Dix and William Powell
- Tumbleweeds, directed by King Baggot, starring William S. Hart

=== U ===
- The Unholy Three, directed by Tod Browning, starring Lon Chaney, Mae Busch, Matt Moore and Victor McLaglen, based on the 1917 novel by Tod Robbins

=== V ===
- Vampires of Warsaw (Wampiry Warszawy) (lost), written and directed by Wiktor Biegański – (Poland)
- Variety (Varieté), directed by Ewald André Dupont, starring Emil Jannings – (Germany)
- Visages d'enfants (Faces of Children), directed by Jacques Feyder – (France)

=== W ===
- The Whirlpool of Fate (La Fille de l'eau), directed by Jean Renoir – (France)
- The White Lily Laments (Shirayuri wa nageku), directed by Kenji Mizoguchi – (Japan)
- The Wizard of Oz, directed by Larry Semon
- Wolf Blood: A Tale of the Forest, directed by George Chesebro and Bruce M. Mitchell
- Womanhandled, directed by Gregory La Cava, starring Richard Dix and Esther Ralston
- A Woman of the World, directed by Mal St. Clair, starring Pola Negri

=== Z ===
- Zander the Great, directed by George W. Hill, starring Marion Davies and Harrison Ford

== Comedy film series ==
- Lupino Lane (1915–1939)
- Our Gang (1922–1944)
- Harry Langdon (1924–1936)

== Animated short film series ==
- Felix the Cat (1919–1936)
- Koko the Clown (1919–1963)
- Aesop's Film Fables (1921–1934)
- Alice Comedies
  - Alice Cans the Cannibals
  - Alice the Toreador
  - Alice Gets Stung
  - Alice Solves the Puzzle
  - Alice's Egg Plant
  - Alice Loses Out
  - Alice is Stage Struck
  - Alice Wins the Derby
  - Alice Picks the Champ
  - Alice's Tin Pony
  - Alice Chops the Suey
  - Alice the Jail Bird
  - Alice Plays Cupid
  - Alice Rattled by Rats
  - Alice in the Jungle
- Koko's Song Car Tunes (1924–1927)
- Krazy Kat (1925–1940)
- Un-Natural History (1925–1927)

== Births ==
- January 1 - Matthew Beard, American actor (died 1981)
- January 6 – Enrique Carreras, Peruvian-born director and producer (died 1995)
- January 9 – Lee Van Cleef, American actor (died 1989)
- January 13
  - Rosemary Murphy, American actress (died 2014)
  - Gwen Verdon, American actress and dancer (died 2000)
- January 15 - Ignacio López Tarso, Mexican actor (died 2023)
- January 21 – Charles Aidman, American actor (died 1993)
- January 24 – Helen Stenborg, American actress (died 2011)
- January 26
  - Joan Leslie, American actress (died 2015)
  - Paul Newman, American actor (died 2008)
- February 2 – Elaine Stritch, American actress (died 2014)
- February 3
  - Shelley Berman, American comedian, actor, and writer (died 2017)
  - John Fiedler, American actor and voice actor (died 2005)
- February 8 – Jack Lemmon, American actor (died 2001)
- February 11 – Kim Stanley, American actress (died 2001)
- February 17
  - Ron Goodwin, English film composer (died 2003)
  - Hal Holbrook, American actor (died 2021)
- February 18 – George Kennedy, American actor (died 2016)
- February 20 – Robert Altman, American director (died 2006)
- February 21 – Sam Peckinpah, American director (died 1984)
- February 25 – Aino Seep, Estonian singer and actress (died 1982)
- February 26 – Selma Archerd, American actress (died 2023)
- March 7 - Richard Vernon, British actor (died 1997)
- March 11 – Peter R. Hunt, British director, editor and producer (died 2002)
- March 13 – Corrado Gaipa, Italian actor (died 1989)
- March 17 - Gabriele Ferzetti, Italian actor (died 2015)
- March 19 - Hilkka Kinnunen, Finnish actress (died 2026)
- March 23 - Thelma Ruby, British actress
- March 29 - Frederick Treves, English actor (died 2012)
- April 14 – Rod Steiger, American actor (died 2002)
- April 18 – Bob Hastings, American actor (died 2014)
- April 19 – Hugh O'Brian, American actor (died 2016)
- April 28 – Bruce Kirby, American character actor (died 2021)
- May 2 – John Neville, English-Canadian actor (died 2011)
- May 14 - Alvin Epstein, American actor and director (died 2018)
- May 25 – Jeanne Crain, American actress (died 2003)
- May 26 – Alec McCowen, English actor (died 2017)
- May 28 – Martha Vickers, American model, actress (died 1971)
- June 3 – Tony Curtis, American actor (died 2010)
- June 4
  - Joe Hale, American animator, layout artist, and producer (died 2025)
  - Gerald Sim, English actor (died 2014)
- June 5 - Henny Orri, Dutch actress (died 2022)
- June 7 – John Biddle, American yachting cinematographer (died 2008)
- June 8 – Charles Tyner, American actor (died 2017)
- June 10 - Diana Maggi, Italian-born Argentine actress (died 2022)
- June 13 – Kristine Miller, American actress (died 2015)
- June 16 – Otto Muehl, Austrian experimental director (died 2013)
- June 20 – Audie Murphy, American soldier, actor, songwriter, rancher (died 1971)
- June 21 – Maureen Stapleton, American actress (died 2006)
- June 25
  - June Lockhart, American actress (died 2025)
  - Virginia Patton, American actress (died 2022)
- June 29
  - John Fujioka, American actor of Japanese descent (died 2018)
  - Cara Williams, American actress (died 2021)
- July 1 – Farley Granger, American actor (died 2011)
- July 6 – Ruth Cracknell, Australian actress (died 2002)
- July 10 – Mildred Kornman, American actress (died 2022)
- July 11 – David Graham, British actor (died 2024)
- July 13 – Huang Zongying, Chinese actress and scriptwriter (died 2020)
- July 14 – Pip Freedman, South African radio comedian and actor (died 2003)
- July 15 – D. A. Pennebaker, American documentary filmmaker (died 2019)
- July 23 – Gloria DeHaven, American actress (died 2016)
- July 24 – Miiko Taka, American actress (died 2023)
- July 25 – Jerry Paris, American actor and director (died 1986)
- August 6 – Barbara Bates, American singer, actress (died 1969)
- August 11 – Arlene Dahl, American actress (died 2021)
- August 13
  - Carlos Balá, Argentine actor (died 2022)
  - Asao Sano, Japanese actor (died 2022)
- August 15 – Mike Connors, American actor (died 2017)
- August 17 – Michael Beint, English actor (died 2026)
- August 22 – Honor Blackman, English actress (died 2020)
- August 23 – Robert Mulligan, American director (died 2008)
- August 27 - Susan Willis, American actress (died 2009)
- August 29 - Dick Cusack, American actor and filmmaker (died 2003)
- August 30 - Frank Ray Perilli, American actor and screenwriter (died 2018)
- September 2 - Ronnie Stevens, English character actor and voice artist (died 2006)
- September 3 - Anne Jackson, American actress (died 2016)
- September 8 – Peter Sellers, English comedian and actor (died 1980)
- September 12
  - James Garbutt, British actor (died 2020)
  - Dickie Moore, American actor (died 2015)
- September 15 - Peggy Webber, American actress and writer (died 2026)
- September 17 - Dorothy Loudon, American actress and singer (died 2003)
- September 18 - Felice Orlandi, Italian-born American actor (died 2003)
- September 21 – Noor Jehan, Indian actress (died 2000)
- September 22 - Virginia Capers, American actress (died 2004)
- September 29 - Steve Forrest, American actor (died 2013)
- October 3 – Gore Vidal, American writer and actor (died 2012)
- October 4 - Edmund Lyndeck, American actor (died 2015)
- October 5 – Gail Davis, American actress (died 1997)
- October 11 – Nancy Guild, American actress (died 1999)
- October 16
  - Angela Lansbury, English-American actress (died 2022)
  - Lenka Peterson, American actress (died 2021)
- October 29
  - Geraldine Brooks, American actress (died 1977)
  - Robert Hardy, English actor (died 2017)
- October 31 – Lee Grant, American actress, documentarian, and director
- November 4 – Doris Roberts, American actress (died 2016)
- November 6 - Michel Bouquet, French actor (died 2022)
- November 10 – Richard Burton, Welsh actor (died 1984)
- November 11 - Jonathan Winters, American comedian, actor, author, television host and artist (died 2013)
- November 17 – Rock Hudson, American actor (died 1985)
- November 22 - Carla Balenda, American actress (died 2024)
- November 25 – June Whitfield, English comic actress (died 2018)
- December 2 – Julie Harris, American Broadway and film actress (died 2013)
- December 3 – Kaljo Kiisk, Estonian actor and director (died 2007)
- December 7 – Sydney Samuelson, English cinematographer (died 2022)
- December 8 – Sammy Davis Jr., American singer, dancer, musician and actor (died 1990)
- December 12 – Anne V. Coates, English film editor (died 2018)
- December 13 – Dick Van Dyke, American actor
- December 18 – Peggy Cummins, Welsh-born Irish actress (died 2017)
- December 23 – Harry Guardino, American actor (died 1995)
- December 28 – Hildegard Knef, German actress, singer and writer (died 2002)

== Deaths ==
- January 24 - Wilton Taylor, American actor (born 1869)
- February 4 - William Haggar, British cinema pioneer (born 1851)
- February 6 - James Kenyon, English businessman and cinema pioneer (born 1850)
- February 7 – Edward Jobson, American actor (born 1860)
- February 25 – Louis Feuillade, French director (born 1873)
- March 13 – Lucille Ricksen, American actress (born 1910)
- April 8 – Thecla Åhlander, Swedish actress (born 1855)
- April 13 – Frederik Buch, Danish actor (born 1875)
- April 16 – David Powell, Scottish actor (born 1883)
- July 29 – Mark Fenton, American actor (born 1866)
- September 28 – Paul Vermoyal, French actor (born 1888)
- October 21 – Orme Caldara, American stage and film actor (born 1875)
- October 31 – Max Linder, French actor (born 1883)
- November 1 – Lester Cuneo American actor (born 1888)
- November 3 – Lucile McVey, American actress (born 1890)
- December 8 – Marguerite Marsh, American actress (born 1888)
- December 9 – Harry Rattenberry, American actor (born 1857)
- December 21 – Lottie Lyell, Australian director/producer (born 1890)
- December 22 – Mary Thurman, American actress (born 1895)
- December 24 - James O. Barrows, American stage and screen actor (born 1855)
- December 31 – J. Gordon Edwards American director (born 1867)

== Film debuts ==
- Barbara Barondess – A Kiss for Cinderella
- Walter Brennan – Webs of Steel
- Iron Eyes Cody – The Road to Yesterday
- Gary Cooper – Dick Turpin
- Harry Cording – The Shock Punch
- Joan Crawford – Lady of the Night
- Yola d'Avril – The Dressmaker from Paris
- Dolores del Río – Joanna
- Wild Bill Elliott – The Plastic Age
- Stepin Fetchit – The Mysterious Stranger
- Paul Fix – The Perfect Clown
- Joyzelle Joyner – Ben-Hur
- Jack La Rue – The Lucky Devil
- René Lefèvre – Knock
- Myrna Loy – Pretty Ladies
- Mona Maris – The Apache
- Chris-Pin Martin – The Gold Rush
- Maximilienne – Le Double Amour
- Tim McCoy – The Thundering Herd
- Ida Moore – Lightnin'
- Anita Page – A Kiss for Cinderella
- Bodil Rosing – Pretty Ladies
- Dorothy Sebastian – Sackcloth and Scarlet
- Nicholas Soussanin – The Swan
- Grady Sutton – The Mad Whirl
- Michael Visaroff – The Swan
- Fay Wray – The Coast Patrol

== Bibliography ==
- Block, Alex Ben; Wilson, Lucy Autrey, eds. (2010). George Lucas's Blockbusting: A Decade-by-Decade Survey of Timeless Movies Including Untold Secrets of Their Financial and Cultural Success. HarperCollins. ISBN 978-0-06-177889-6.
