= Green Archer =

Green Archer or The Green Archer may refer to:

- De La Salle Green Archers, the De La Salle University varsity teams
  - De La Salle Green Archers basketball, basketball team
- Green Archers United F.C., association football team in the Philippines
- Green Archer (radar), a British mortar locating radar of the 1960s and 1970s
- The Green Archer (1923 novel), a 1923 novel by Edgar Wallace
  - The Green Archer (1925 serial), a 1925 Pathé film serial directed by Spencer Gordon Bennet
  - The Green Archer (1940 serial), a 1940 Columbia Pictures film serial directed by James W. Horne
  - The Green Archer (1961 film), a 1961 German film directed by Jürgen Roland

== See also ==
- Robin Hood, a heroic outlaw in English folklore who, according to legend, was a highly skilled archer and swordsman
- Green Arrow, a fictional superhero who appears in comic books published by DC Comics
