= List of Soviet films of 1925 =

A list of films produced in the Soviet Union in 1925 (see 1925 in film).

== 1925 ==
Title	Russian title	Director	Cast	Genre	Notes
1925
Aero NT-54	Аэро НТ-54	Nikolai Petrov	Elena Korchagina-Alexandrovskaya	Adventure	
The Case of Tariel Mklavadze	Дело Тариэла Мклавадзе	Ivane Perestiani	Kote Mikaberidze	Horror	
Battleship Potemkin	Броненосец «Потёмкин	Sergei Eisenstein		Drama	
Chess Fever	Шахматная горячка	Vsevolod Pudovkin, Nikolai Shpikovsky	José Raúl Capablanca, Vladimir Fogel	Comedy	
Cross and Mauser	Крест и Маузер	Vladimir Gardin	Yevgeni Chervyakov	Adventure	
The Death Ray	Луч смерти	Lev Kuleshov	Porfiri Podobed, Vsevolod Pudovkin, Vladimir Fogel	Science fiction	Partially lost
Fedka's Truth	Федькина правда	Olga Preobrazhenskaya			
Gold Reserves	Золотй Запас	Vladimir Gardin	Yevgeni Chervyakov	Adventure	
His Call	Его призыв	Yakov Protazanov	Varvara Popova	Drama	
Jewish Luck	Еврейское счастье	Alexis Granowsky	Solomon Mikhoels, Moisei Goldblat, Tamara Adelgeym	Comedy	
Kommunit	Коммунит	Yakov Morin	Lyantse, Banovsky, Vladimir Shakhovsky, V. Arnoldov, Semyon Brümer	Propaganda	Lost film
The Marriage of the Bear	Медвежья свадьба	Vladimir Gardin, Konstantin Eggert	Konstantin Eggert, Vera Malinovskaya	Horror, fantasy, drama	
Mishki versus Yudenich	Мишки против Юденича	Grigori Kozintsev, Leonid Trauberg	Aleksandr Zavyalov	Comedy	Lost film
Namus	Намус	Hamo Beknazarian	Hovhannes Abelian, Hasmik	Drama	
The Stationmaster	Коллежский регистратор	Ivan Moskvin, Yuri Zhelyabuzhsky	Ivan Moskvin, Vera Malinovskaya, Vsevolod Aksyonov	Drama	
Stepan Khalturin	Степан Халтурин	Aleksandr Ivanovsky	Aleksandr Morozov, Angelina Raupenas, Nikolai Shmidtgof	Biopic	
Strike	Стачка	Sergei Eisenstein	Grigori Aleksandrov, Aleksandr Antonov	Historical drama	
The Tailor from Torzhok	Закройщик из Торжка	Yakov Protazanov	Igor Ilyinsky, Vera Maretskaya	Comedy	
You give Radio!	Даёшь радио!	Sergei Yutkevich	Boris Poslavsky, Pyotr Repnin	Comedy, short	Lost film
Who is the Guilty?	Наездник из Вайлд Вест	Alexandre Tsutsunava	Kote Mikaberidze	Western	

== See also ==
- 1925 in the Soviet Union
