= List of British films of 1925 =

A list of British films released in 1925.

== 1925 ==
Title	Director	Cast	Genre	Notes
1925
Afraid of Love	Reginald West	Jameson Thomas, Juliette Compton, Moore Marriott	Drama	
The Apache	Adelqui Migliar	Mona Maris, Adelqui Migliar, Jameson Thomas	Drama	
The Blackguard	Graham Cutts	Jane Novak, Walter Rilla, Bernhard Goetzke	Drama	Co-production with Germany
Bulldog Drummond's Third Round	Sidney Morgan	Jack Buchanan, Betty Faire, Juliette Compton	Crime	
Chu-Chin-Chow	Herbert Wilcox	Betty Blythe, Herbert Langley, Jameson Thomas	Adventure	Filmed in Germany
Confessions	W. P. Kellino	Ian Hunter, Joan Lockton, Moore Marriott	Comedy	
A Daughter of Love	Walter West	Violet Hopson, John Stuart, Jameson Thomas	Drama	
A Girl of London	Henry Edwards	Genevieve Townsend, Ian Hunter, Harvey Braban	Drama	
The Gold Cure	W. P. Kellino	Queenie Thomas, Gladys Hamer, Jameson Thomas	Comedy	
The Happy Ending	George A. Cooper	Fay Compton, Jack Buchanan, Joan Barry	Drama	
King of the Castle	Henry Edwards	Marjorie Hume, Brian Aherne	Drama	
The Lady in Furs	Edwin Greenwood	Miles Mander, Margaret Yarde	Drama	
The Last Witness	Fred Paul	Fred Paul, Isobel Elsom, Stella Arbenina	Crime	
Livingstone	M. A. Wetherell	M. A. Wetherell, Simeon Stuart, Reginald Fox	Biopic	
Money Isn't Everything	Thomas Bentley	Olive Sloane, Lewis Gilbert	Romance	
Mutiny	Floyd Martin Thornton	Nigel Barrie, Walter Tennyson	Adventure	
The Pleasure Garden	Alfred Hitchcock	Virginia Valli, Carmelita Geraghty, Miles Mander	Drama	
The Presumption of Stanley Hay, MP	Sinclair Hill	David Hawthorne, Betty Faire	Drama	
The Prude's Fall	Graham Cutts	Jane Novak, Warwick Ward	Drama	
The Rat	Graham Cutts	Ivor Novello, Mae Marsh, Isabel Jeans	Drama	
A Romance of Mayfair	Thomas Bentley	Betty Faire, Henry Victor	Romance	
Satan's Sister	George Pearson	Betty Balfour, James Carew	Adventure	
The Secret Kingdom	Sinclair Hill	Matheson Lang, Stella Arbenina	Fantasy	
Settled Out of Court	George A. Cooper	Fay Compton, Jack Buchanan	Drama	
She	Leander de Cordova, G. B. Samuelson	Betty Blythe, Carlyle Blackwell	Adventure	Co-production with Germany
Somebody's Darling	George A. Cooper	Betty Balfour, Forrester Harvey	Comedy	
Sons of the Sea	H. Bruce Woolfe	D. C. Kenerdine, Dorothy Barclay	Adventure	
The Squire of Long Hadley	Sinclair Hill	Marjorie Hume, Brian Aherne	Drama	
Trainer and Temptress	Walter West	Juliette Compton, James Knight	Sports	
Venetian Lovers	Walter Niebuhr, Frank A. Tilley	Arlette Marchal, John Stuart	Drama	Filmed in Germany
We Women	W. P. Kellino	John Stuart, Reginald Bach	Comedy	
Ypres	Walter Summers		War	Documentary reconstruction

== See also ==
- 1925 in film
- 1925 in the United Kingdom
