= Boris Gorin-Goryainov =

Boris Anatolyevich Gorin-Goryainov (Russian – Борис Анатольевич Горин-Горяйнов; 6 (19) November 1883, St Petersburg – 15 April 1944, Leningrad) was a Soviet stage and film actor, theatre director and writer. He is notable for his appearances in films such as The Lame Gentleman (1929) and Lieutenant Kijé (1934). In 1935, he was made a People’s Artist of the RSFSR. He refused to join the evacuation of Leningrad during World War II and died in 1944 in the ensuing siege.
