= Man from the Restaurant =

1927 film by Yakov Protazanov

- Directed by: Yakov Protazanov
- Written by: Yakov Protazanov; Oleg Leonidov; Ivan Shmelyov (story)
- Starring: Michael Chekhov; Vera Malinovskaya; Ivan Koval-Samborsky
- Cinematography: Anatoli Golovnya; Konstantin Vents
- Production company: Mezhrabpomfilm
- Release dates: 12 June 1927 (USSR); 4 January 1930 (USA)
- Running time: 62 minutes
- Country: Soviet Union
- Language: Silent film (Russian intertitles)

Man from the Restaurant (Russian: Человек из ресторана, romanized: Chelovek iz restorana) is a 1927 Soviet drama film directed by Yakov Protazanov based on the story by Ivan Shmelyov. The main role was written for Ivan Moskvin, but he was changed for Chekhov because of illness.

== Plot ==
After the death of his son at the front, and his wife's demise, widower waiter Skorohodov rents his room to Sokolin, a young man who works as a messenger in one of the offices. The lodger and Skorohodov's daughter fall in love with each other, but an unexpected contender has appeared to the modest young man in the guise of Karasyov, a constant patron of the restaurant, a factory owner who decides to seduce the woman who he has taken a liking to.

== Cast ==
- Michael Chekhov
- Vera Malinovskaya
- Ivan Koval-Samborsky
- Mikhail Narokov
- Mikhail Klimov
- Andrey Petrovsky
- K. Alekseyeva
- Mikhail Zharov
- Raisa Karelina-Raich
- Sofya Yakovleva
- Stepan Kuznetsov
- Mark Prudkin
