= The Lame Gentleman =

- German poster
- Directed by: Konstantin Eggert
- Written by: Georgiy Grebner; Aleksey Nikolayevich Tolstoy
- Cinematography: Louis Forestier
- Production company: Mezhrabpomfilm
- Release date: 5 February 1929
- Country: Soviet Union
- Languages: Silent; Russian intertitles

The Lame Gentleman (Russian: Хромой барин) is a 1929 Soviet silent film directed by Konstantin Eggert.

The film's art direction was by Vladimir Yegorov.

== Plot ==
Based on the short story of the same name by Aleksey Nikolayevich Tolstoy.

Prince Krasnopolski seduces a peasant girl named Sasha. Soon, the aristocrat becomes infatuated with the daughter of the landowner Volkov and abandons Sasha. In despair, the girl throws herself into the river.

The happiness built upon the girl's demise proves to be fragile. Eventually, the prince meets his end at the hands of Sasha's sister.

== Cast ==
- Mikhail Klimov as Volkov
- Nikolai Alexandrov
- L. Cherkes
- Konstantin Eggert
- Lev Fenin
- Boris Gorin-Goryainov
- Georgy Kovrov
- Olga Lenskaya
- Yelena Maksimova
- Vera Malinovskaya
- F. Trubetskoy
- Vladimir Vladislavskiy
- Daniil Vvedenskiy
- Konstantin Zubov

== Bibliography ==
- Christie, Ian & Taylor, Richard. The Film Factory: Russian and Soviet Cinema in Documents 1896-1939. Routledge, 2012.
