= Konstantin Zubov =

- Born: Konstantin Aleksandrovich Zubov; September 20, 1888; Bazarny Syzgan, Karsunsky Uyezd, Simbirsk Governorate, Russian Empire
- Died: November 22, 1956 (aged 68); Moscow, Soviet Union
- Occupations: Actor, film and theater director, theater pedagogue
- Years active: 1917–1956
- Awards: Stalin Prize first degree (1948, 1951). Stalin Prize second degree (1946, 1947)

Konstantin Aleksandrovich Zubov (Russian: Константин Александрович Зубов; 20 September 1888 – 22 November 1956) was a Soviet and Russian actor, film and theater director and pedagogue. People's Artist of the USSR (1949). He was a four-time recipient of the Stalin Prize (1946, 1947, 1948, 1951).

== Biography ==
Konstantin Zubov was born in the village of Bazarny Syzgan (now an urban-type settlement in Ulyanovsk Oblast, Russia), although other sources give Vyatka as his birthplace, and his passport listed Leningrad, into the family of Aleksandr Vasilyevich Zubov, a feldfebel, and Aleksandra Semyonovna Zubova.

In 1895, the Zubov family moved from Simbirsk Governorate to Vyatka Governorate, where his father obtained a position as a teacher at a boys' gymnasium.

Zubov developed an interest in theatre at an early age, but his parents did not share it. After graduating from gymnasium in 1904, they sent him to study at a technical school in Nancy, France, where he was expected to train as an engineer. A year later, he changed institutions and enrolled in the Faculty of History and Philology at the University of Paris. In 1906, he returned to Russia and continued his studies at the same faculty of Saint Petersburg University, while also attending the Dramatic Courses of the Saint Petersburg Imperial Theatre School (now the Russian State Institute of Performing Arts), where he studied acting under Vladimir Davydov and graduated in 1910.

In 1908, he began his professional stage career in Vladimir Davydov's summer touring troupe; his first role was Alyosha in The Children of Vanyushin by Sergey Naydyonov. He later studied at the School of Stage Art run by Aleksandr Sanin and Aleksandr Petrovsky. From 1910 to 1915, apart from the 1913–1914 season, when he worked at the Samara Drama Theatre, he performed in Nikolai Sinelnikov's company in Kharkiv and Kyiv. From 1915 to 1917, he acted at the Korsh Theatre in Moscow.

From 1917 to 1918, he headed the Actors' Association of the Irkutsk Drama Theatre, where he first worked as a director. From 1918 to 1919, he was an actor and director at M. A. Smolensky's theatre in Harbin; from 1919 to 1921, at Y. M. Dolin's theatre in Vladivostok; from 1921 to 1924, he was an actor, artistic director, and chief director of the First State Far Eastern Military-Revolutionary Theatre in Khabarovsk, Vladivostok, and Harbin; from 1924 to 1925, chief director of the Chita State Theatre; from 1925 to 1931, actor, director, and troupe manager at the Moscow Theatre of Revolution; from 1931 to 1933, actor at the Moscow Theatre of the Moscow Council of Trade Unions (now the Mossovet Theatre); and from 1932 to 1938, artistic director of the Moscow Lensoviet Theatre, which was later merged with the Theatre of Revolution.

From 1936, he was an actor and director at the Maly Theatre, and from 1947 its chief director.

His work was noted for its intellectual quality, vivid theatricality, and psychological depth. He was regarded as a master of dialogue.

He also appeared in films.

From 1920 onward, he was engaged in teaching, lecturing at the theatre school attached to the Maly Theatre (now the Mikhail Shchepkin Higher Theatre School); in 1946, he became a professor. His students included Tatyana Pankova, Pavel Luspekayev, Eduard Martsevich, and Igor Kirillov.

He was a deputy of the Supreme Soviet of the Russian SFSR of the 4th convocation (1955–1956).

Konstantin Zubov died in Moscow on 22 November 1956. He was buried at Novodevichy Cemetery (plot No. 2).

== Selected filmography ==
- 1916 — Nelli Raintseva
- 1917 — The Revolutionary
- 1928 — The Lame Gentleman
- 1933 — Marionettes
- 1940 — Yakov Sverdlov
