= The Desert Hawk (serial) =

- Directed by: B. Reeves Eason
- Written by: Sherman L. Lowe; Leslie Swabacker; Jack Stanley; Leighton Brill
- Produced by: Rudolph C. Flothow
- Starring: Gilbert Roland; Mona Maris; Ben Welden; Kenneth MacDonald; Frank Lackteen; I. Stanford Jolley; Charles Middleton
- Cinematography: James S. Brown Jr.
- Music by: Lee Zahler
- Distributed by: Columbia Pictures
- Release date: July 7, 1944
- Country: United States
- Language: English

The Desert Hawk is a 1944 Columbia film serial. It was the 23rd serial produced by Columbia. Gilbert Roland played a dual role in this serial, that of Kasim, The Desert Hawk and also Hassan, his evil twin brother. Co-stars included serial regulars Charles Middleton, Frank Lackteen and I. Stanford Jolley.

== Plot ==
The sinister Hassan starts plotting against the recently crowned Caliph, his twin brother Kasim. The evil twin engages the help of Faud who sends his man to the palace to kidnap the Caliph and murder him. These henchmen enter the palace and wound Kasim who manages to escape. A beggar named Omar finds him and cares for him until his health is restored. By the time the wounded Kasim recovers, his brother has taken over the throne. Hassan plans to marry Princess Azala, the daughter of the Emir of Telif, who does not know that the current Caliph is an impostor. Kasim decides to fight for the throne and the princess after he finds a suit of chainmail displaying a hawk on the front.

== Cast ==
- Gilbert Roland - Kasim, The Desert Hawk and Hassan, his Evil Twin Brother
- Mona Maris - Princess Azala
- Ben Welden - Omar, the Beggar
- Kenneth MacDonald - Akbar
- Frank Lackteen - Faud, the Chief Chamberlain
- I. Stanford Jolley - Saladin
- Charles Middleton - Koda Bey
- Egon Brecher - Grey Wizard
- Georges Renavent - Emil of Telif (as George Renavent)
- Margia Dean - Wizard's Daughter
- Forrest Taylor - Akrad, the money-lender

== Production ==
The Desert Hawk is a "western" set in the Middle East with swashbuckling elements.

== Critical reception ==
According to reviewer William Cline, Gilbert Roland was "superbly convincing as the dashing Hawk, and made memorable an otherwise routine thriller."

== Chapter titles ==
1. The Twin Brothers
2. The Evil Eye
3. The Mark of the Scimitar
4. A Caliph's Treachery
5. The Secret of the Palace
6. The Feast of the Beggars
7. Double Jeopardy
8. The Slave Traders
9. The Underground River
10. The Fateful Wheel
11. The Mystery of the Mosque
12. The Hand of Vengeance
13. Swords of Fate
14. The Wizard's Story
15. The Triumph of Kasim

_{Source:}

== See also ==
- List of American films of 1944
- List of film serials by year
- List of film serials by studio

Preceded by The Phantom (1943)	Columbia Serial; The Desert Hawk (1944)	Succeeded by Black Arrow (1944)
