= The Favourite of Schonbrunn =

1929 film

- French release poster for the film
- Directed by: Erich Waschneck
- Written by: Ladislaus Vajda
- Produced by: Guido Bagier; Herman Millakowsky; Georg Witt
- Starring: Iván Petrovich; Lil Dagover; Vera Malinovskaya
- Cinematography: Friedl Behn-Grund
- Music by: Giuseppe Becce
- Production company: Greenbaum-Film
- Distributed by: Bavaria Film
- Release date: 16 September 1929
- Running time: 100 minutes
- Country: Germany
- Languages: Silent; German intertitles

The Favourite of Schonbrunn (German: Der Günstling von Schönbrunn) is a 1929 German historical film directed by Erich Waschneck and Max Reichmann and starring Iván Petrovich, Lil Dagover and Vera Malinovskaya. It was a part-talkie, with some sequences in sound and others silent. The film's sets were designed by the art directors Erich Czerwonski and Alfred Junge.

== Cast ==
- Iván Petrovich as Oberst Trenck
- Lil Dagover as Kaiserin Maria Theresia
- Vera Malinovskaya as Gräfin Nostiz
- Henry Stuart as Kaiser Franz
- Kurt Vespermann as Trencks Diener
- John Mylong as Ordonnanz des Kaisers
- Ferdinand von Alten
- Valeria Blanka
- Ludwig Stössel
- Alexander Murski

== See also ==
- Trenck, der Pandur (1940)

== Bibliography ==
- Kosta, Barbara. Willing Seduction: The Blue Angel, Marlene Dietrich, and Mass Culture. Berghahn Books, 2009.
