= Stepan Kuznetsov =

Russian actor

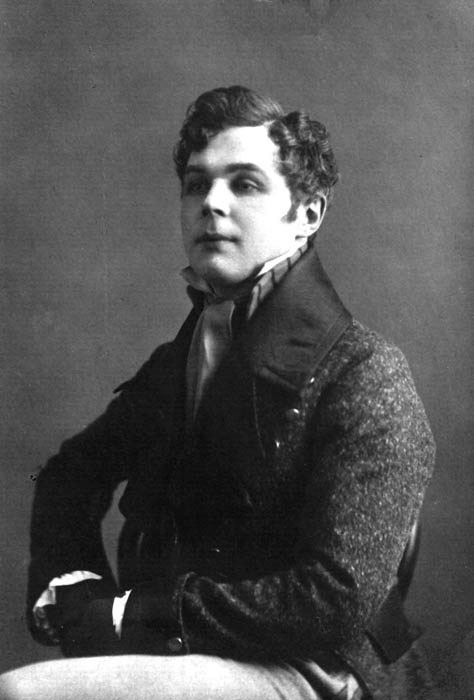
- Stepan Kuznetsov
- Born: Stepan Kuznetsov; 14 April 1879
- Died: 18 April 1932 (aged 53)
- Occupation: Actor
- Years active: 1917–1928

Stepan Kuznetsov (Russian: Степан Кузнецов) was a Soviet male actor. People's Artist of the RSFSR.

== Selected filmography ==
- 1923 — Locksmith and Chancellor
- 1927 — Man from the Restaurant
- 1927 — Solistka ego velichestva
