= The Green Archer (1961 film) =

- German theatrical releaseposter
- Der grüne Bogenschütze
- Directed by: Jürgen Roland
- Written by: Wolfgang Schnitzler; Wolfgang Menge
- Based on: The Green Archer by Edgar Wallace
- Produced by: Horst Wendlandt
- Starring: Gert Fröbe; Karin Dor; Eddi Arent
- Cinematography: Heinz Hölscher
- Edited by: Herbert Taschner
- Music by: Heinz Funk
- Production company: Rialto Film
- Distributed by: Constantin Film
- Release date: 2 February 1961
- Running time: 93 minutes
- Country: West Germany
- Language: German

The Green Archer (German: Der grüne Bogenschütze) is a 1961 West German black and white crime film directed by Jürgen Roland and starring Gert Fröbe, Klausjürgen Wussow, Karin Dor and Eddi Arent. It is based on the 1923 novel The Green Archer by Edgar Wallace.

== Plot ==
During a guided tour of Garre Castle, a man is killed by an arrow after sneaking away from the rest of the group. Shortly thereafter, Mr Howett and his adopted daughter, Valerie, move into Lady's Manor, next door to the castle. Valerie is looking for her mother she has not seen in 20 years. John Wood, a friend of Valerie's brother John Bellamy, who was killed in the war, is also there.

Abel Bellamy, Valerie’s uncle, an American with a murky past in Chicago, and owner of Garre Castle returns to London. At the airport he is questioned by journalists on the death in his home, and reacts aggressively. Spike Holland, a journalist, is asked by a man named Creager to come and see him to learn something of interest. Creager calls Scotland Yard, offering them information on Bellamy but he is shot by the Green Archer. When Holland arrives at Creager's house, Creager is dead. The police investigation turns up that Bellamy has been paying 40 pounds per month to Creager. Bellamy claims it was because Creager saved his life once.

At night, the Green Archer appears in Bellamy's bedroom but Bellamy wakes up and drives him off with his pistol, wounding him in the process. A blood covered handkerchief with the initials "V.H." is found. It turns out that Bellamy keeps Valerie's mother Elaine imprisoned in the basement of his castle. She thinks both her son and daughter are dead. Valerie Howett learns from Bellamy's embezzling secretary Julius Savini, whom she has been paying for information, that Bellamy has contacted one Coldharbour Smith. He lived near her mother when she disappeared and now runs the Shanghai Bar. Valerie visits the bar and a confrontation ensues that is only ended by the arrival of Holland. Valerie next tries to sneak into Garre Castle at night. When she is threatened by Bellamy's dogs, one of them is shot and killed by the Green Archer.

Meanwhile, Inspector Featherstone of Scotland Yard has infiltrated the Bellamy household by hiring on as a member of the staff. His suspicions are aroused and a search of the castle is initiated. Nothing incriminating is found, however.

Valerie is kidnapped and driven to the Shanghai Bar by Lacy, one of Bellamy's men pretending to be a police officer. Savini recognizes the man and follows them. There is a police raid at the bar, but Valerie has already been taken away via a secret exit to a freighter ship called "Calliope". A police search of the ship fails to turn up anything, as Valerie is hidden in a concealed compartment. Savini manages to climb on board the ship, but is captured. Smith is killed by the Archer. Savini and Valerie escape.

Next day, when Bellamy opens the secret door he is overseen by the police. They go into the cellar, but the woman Bellamy held there is gone. The police leave. Bellamy tricks Savini and his wife and locks them into the basement.

Whilst phoning Featherstone, Valerie is kidnapped by the Archer and taken via a secret passage to the dungeon beneath Garre Castle. Featherstone arrives and is captured, too. Bellamy reveals that his brother stole his girlfriend from him. To take revenge, he locked her up and had her son sent to prison where he was tortured by prison guard Creager. Bellamy attempts to drown his prisoners by flooding the cellar.

The police arrive at Garre Castle and a shootout with Bellamy and his henchmen ensues. Bellamy is shot and killed by the Archer. An explosive device used by the police then inadvertently kills the Archer - he is revealed to be "John Wood", who is actually John Bellamy, Valerie's brother. He was on a crusade of revenge against those who were responsible for his incarceration and torture: Bellamy, Smith and Creager. The prisoners are freed. Bellamy's dead butler is discovered to also wear a green suit under his clothes. There were thus two Green Archers, one of them doing Bellamy's bidding, one trying to destroy him. According to Featherstone, Valerie's mother is safe.

== Cast ==
- Gert Fröbe as Abel Bellamy
- Klausjürgen Wussow as Inspector James Lamotte Featherstone
- Karin Dor as Valerie Howett
- Eddi Arent as "Spike" Holland
- Harry Wüstenhagen as Julius Savini
- Wolfgang Völz as Sergeant Higgins
- Heinz Weiss as John Wood
- Stanislav Ledinek as "Coldharbour" Smith
- Hans Epskamp as Mr. Howett
- Georg Lehn as Mr. Lacy
- Edith Teichmann as Fay Savini
- Hela Gruel as Elaine Bellamy
- Helga Feddersen as Janet
- Karl-Heinz Peters as Mr. Creager

== Production ==
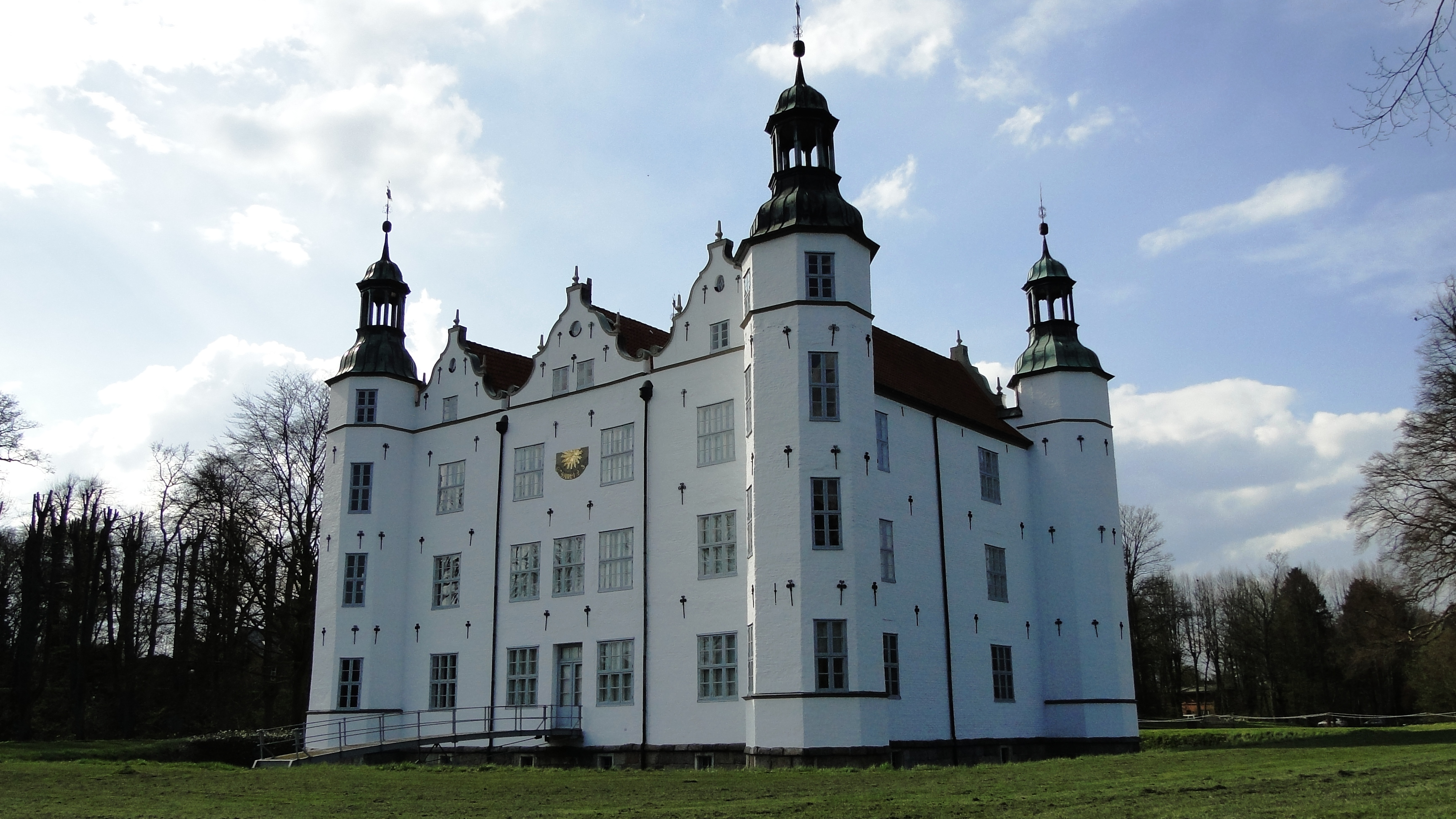
Schloss Ahrensburg, used as "Garre Castle" in the film, in 2012

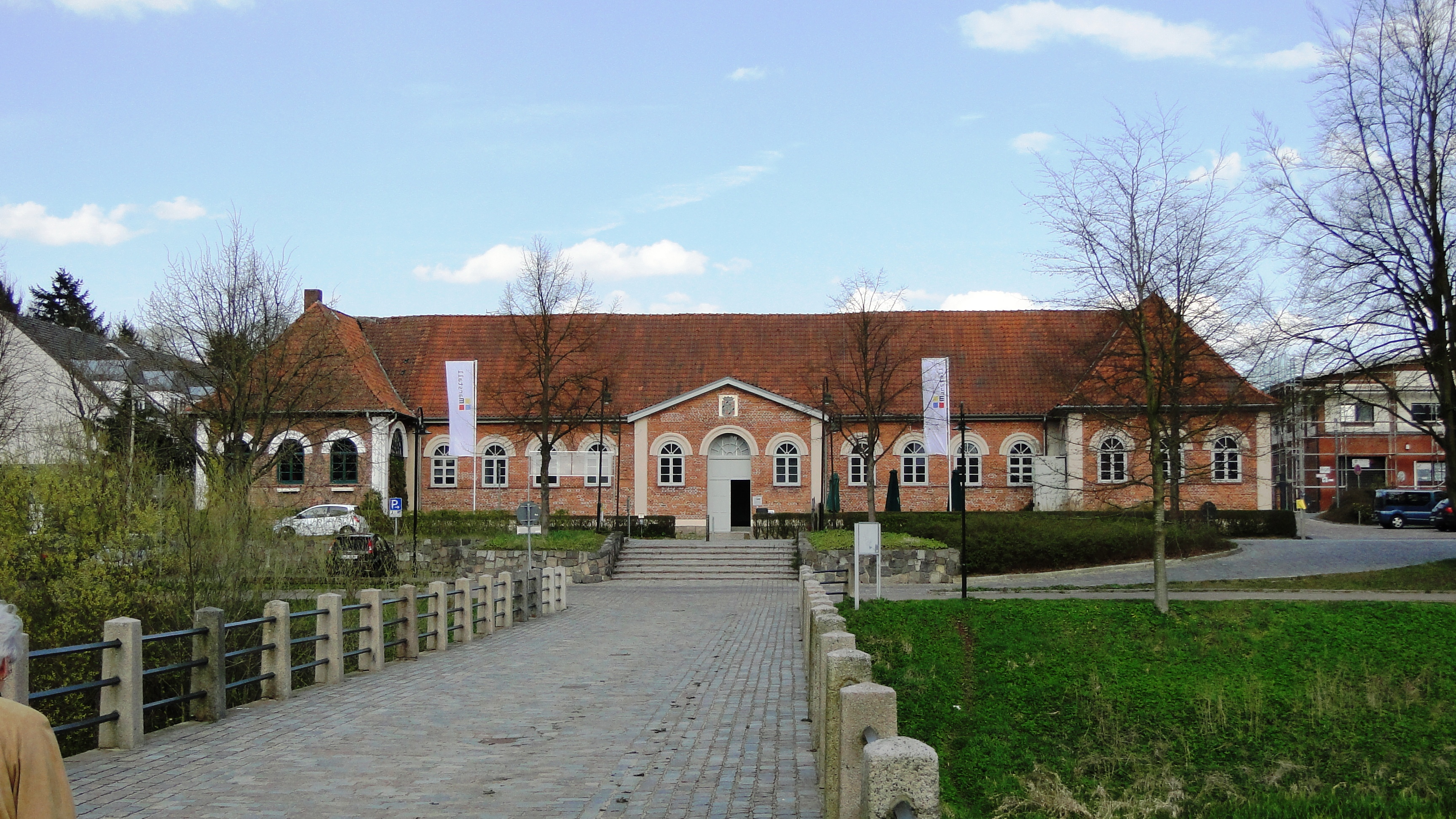
Gutshof of Schloss Ahrensburg, used as "Lady's Manor" in the film, in 2012

Earlier film versions of Wallace's story were produced in the US as serials in 1925 and 1940. The script for the German version was written by Wolfgang Schnitzler (aka Marcel Valmy) with contributions by Wolfgang Menge. This was the first Rialto film produced by Horst Wendlandt who was previously employed by Artur Brauner's CCC Film.

This was Jürgen Roland's second (after The Crimson Circle ) and last film based on a Wallace novel. It was the fourth Wallace film made by Rialto.

Cinematography took place from October 1960 to January 1961. Interiors were filmed at Real Film's Wandsbek Studios in Hamburg, four later films from the series were also shot there. Exteriors were filmed at Hamburg and at Schloss Ahrensburg. The film's sets were designed by the art directors Mathias Matthies and Ellen Schmidt, who frequently collaborated.

== Release ==
The FSK gave the film a rating of 12 years and up, unsuitable for screening on public holidays. It went on mass release on 3 February 1961, but there was no premiere.

=== Critical response ===
Commentary on the acting generally concluded that Fröbe dominated his fellow actors.

The Lexikon des Internationalen Films called the film "nicely spooky-comical, stuffed with clichés of the genre. Foggy streets, mysterious castles, trap doors, masked murderers and avengers, criminal types in dive bars and secret passages. Amusing entertainment."

== See also ==
- The Green Archer (1925, film serial)
- The Green Archer (1940, film serial)
