= The Green Archer (1940 serial) =

1940 film by James W. Horne

- Directed by: James W. Horne
- Screenplay by: Morgan Cox (as Morgan B. Cox); John Cutting; Jesse Duffy (as Jesse D. Duffy; James W. Horne
- Based on: The Green Archer by Edgar Wallace
- Produced by: Larry Darmour
- Starring: Victor Jory; Iris Meredith
- Cinematography: James S. Brown Jr.
- Edited by: Dwight Caldwell; Earl Turner
- Music by: Lee Zahler
- Production company: Columbia Pictures
- Distributed by: Columbia Pictures
- Release date: October 25, 1940
- Running time: 285 minutes (15 episodes)
- Country: United States
- Language: English

The Green Archer is the 12th serial released by Columbia Pictures. It was based on Edgar Wallace's 1923 novel The Green Archer, which had previously been adapted into the silent serial of the same name in 1925 by Pathé Exchange.

== Plot ==
The struggle over the Bellamy estate ends with Michael Bellamy accused of murder and killed on the way to prison, while his brother, Abel Bellamy, takes control of the estate for his own nefarious plans. Bellamy is using Garr Castle as a base for his jewelry-theft ring, and he kidnaps his brother's wife to keep things quiet. Insurance investigator Spike Holland enters the case, and Bellamy continually dispatches his resident gang to do away with him. Detective Thompson, representing the law, is seldom of any help. Meanwhile, the estate's fabled "Green Archer", a masked, leotard-clad marksman, steals silently through Garr Castle and the estate grounds, confounding the enemy forces.

This serial is an example of a fifteen-episode production that could have been rented for a twelve-episode run, as three episodes use an entirely self-contained subplot concerning the theft of a synthetic radium formula.

== Cast ==
- Victor Jory as Spike Holland
- Iris Meredith as Valerie Howett
- James Craven as Abel Bellamy
- Robert Fiske as Savini
- Dorothy Fay as Elaine Bellamy
- Forrest Taylor as Parker Howett
- Jack Ingram as Brad - Henchman
- Joseph W. Girard as Inspector Ross
- Fred Kelsey as Capt. Thompson
- Kit Guard as Dinky Stone - Henchman / Radio Man
- Kenne Duncan as Michael Bellamy / Green Archer (uncredited)

== Chapter titles ==
1. Prison Bars Beckon
2. The Face at the Window
3. The Devil's Dictograph
4. Vanishing Jewels
5. The Fatal Spark
6. The Necklace of Treachery
7. The Secret Passage
8. Garr Castle is Robbed
9. Mirror of Treachery
10. The Dagger that Failed
11. The Flaming Arrow
12. The Devil Dogs
13. The Deceiving Microphone
14. End of Hope
15. The Green Archer Exposed

== Production ==
The script was written by Morgan B. Cox, John Cutting, and Jesse A. Duffy. Director James W. Horne also contributed to the script, which often emphasizes tongue-in-cheek comedy. Under Horne's direction, the heroes and villains exaggerate the melodrama — James Craven is enjoyably florid as the villain, and his henchmen also play for laughs, with comedian Fred Kelsey cast as a very dumb detective. In one scene some of the crooks are shown playing tiddlywinks.

The serial was released in the US on October 1, 1940, and in Latin America in March 1941 under the title El Arquero Verde (in English with Spanish subtitles). The Green Archer was one of 1940's best remembered serials.

== See also ==
- List of American films of 1940
- List of film serials by year
- List of film serials by studio
- The Green Archer (1961)

Preceded by Deadwood Dick (1940)	Columbia serial The Green Archer (1940)	Succeeded by White Eagle (1941)
