= Vera Malinovskaya =

Russian actress

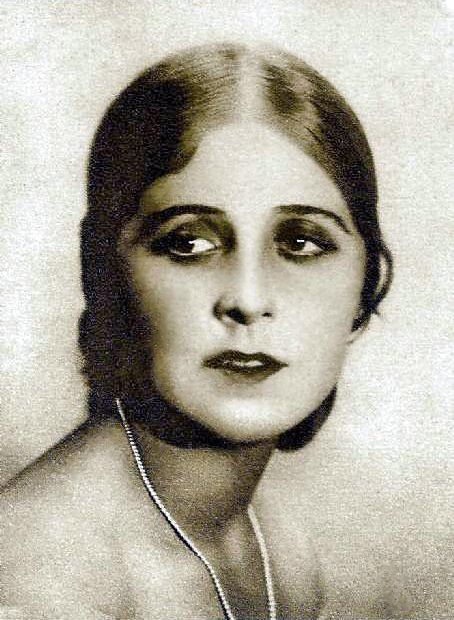
- Born: Vera Stepanovna Malinovskaya; 1900; Kyiv, Russian Empire (now Ukraine)
- Died: 1988 (aged 87–88); Monaco
- Occupation: Actress
- Years active: 1924-1929

Vera Stepanovna Malinovskaya (Russian:Вера Степановна Малиновская) was a Russian silent film actress.

== Filmography ==
- Vsem na radost (1924)
- The Stationmaster (1925) Dunya
- The Marriage of the Bear (1926) as Yulka
- Chuzhaya (1927) as Frosya
- Man from the Restaurant (1927)
- A Kiss from Mary Pickford (1927) as herself (cameo)
- Ledyanoy dom (1928)
- The Lame Gentleman (1928)
- Kaiserjäger (1928)
- Waterloo (1929) as Gräfin Tarnowska
- The Favourite of Schonbrunn (1929) as Gräfin Nostiz
