= Aero NT-54 =

1925 film

- Directed by: Nikolai Petrov
- Written by: Nikolai Surovtsev (script)
- Starring: Elena Korchagina-Alexandrovskaya; Vladimir Voronov; Alexander Orlov
- Cinematography: Albert Kyun
- Production company: SevZapKino
- Release date: 18 August 1925
- Running time: 61 minutes
- Country: Soviet Union
- Languages: Silent film Russian intertitles

Aero NT-54 (Russian: Аэро НТ-54) is a 1925 Soviet black-and-white silent film directed by Nikolai Petrov. Scriptwriter - Nikolai Surovtsev. The film was censored and banned on 1 December 1928 by Glavrepertkom.

== Plot ==
The plot of the film is based around a Soviet engineer who develops a fantastically powerful aircraft engine for airplanes. Too many parties, however, want to own this invention and so passions run high.
