= Konstantin Eggert =

Konstantin Vladimorovich Eggert
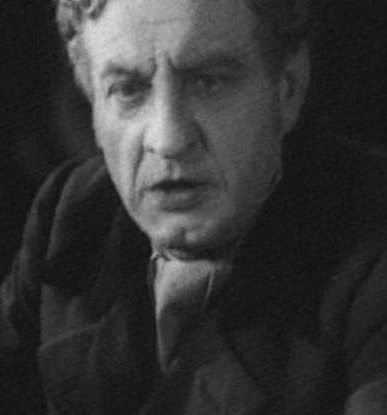
- Konstantin Eggert in Gobseck, 1936
- Born: 9 October 1883; Moscow, Russian Empire
- Died: 24 October 1955 (aged 72); Soviet Union
- Other name: Konstantin Vladimirovich Eggert
- Occupations: Actor, Director
- Years active: 1924-1937 (film)

Konstantin Vladimorovich Eggert (Russian: Константин Владимирович Эггерт; 9 October 1883 – 24 October 1955) was a Russian actor and film director. He co-directed the 1925 film The Marriage of the Bear.

== Selected filmography ==
=== Director ===
- Aelita (1924)
- The Marriage of the Bear (1925)
- The Diplomatic Pouch (1927)
- The Lame Gentleman (1929)
- Black and White (1932)
- Goryachaya krov (1932)
- Nastenka Ustinova (1934)
- Vosstaniye rybakov (1934)
- Gobseck (1937)

== Bibliography ==
- Liz-Anne Bawden (ed.) The Oxford Companion to Film. Oxford University Press, 1976.
