= The Apache (1925 film) =

1925 British silent film by Adelqui Migliar

- Directed by: Adelqui Migliar
- Written by: Michael Allard
- Produced by: Adelqui Migliar; Herbert Thompson
- Starring: Adelqui Migliar; Mona Maris; Jameson Thomas
- Production company: Millar-Thompson
- Distributed by: Napoleon Films
- Release date: August 1925
- Running time: 75 minutes
- Country: United Kingdom
- Languages: Silent; English intertitles

The Apache is a 1925 British silent drama film directed by and starring Adelqui Migliar. It also features Mona Maris and Jameson Thomas. It is a Paris-set melodrama. The title refers to the Apache dance popularly associated with the city during the era.

== Cast ==
- Adelqui Migliar as The Panther
- Mona Maris as Lisette Blanchard
- Jameson Thomas as Gaston d'Harcourt
- Jerrold Robertshaw as Albert d'Harcourt
- Roger San Juana as Mario
- James Carrasco as Gaspard
- Doris Mansell as Armande

== Bibliography ==
- Low, Rachael. The History of the British Film 1918-1929. George Allen & Unwin, 1971.
