= The Marriage of the Bear =

1925 film

- Directed by: Vladimir Gardin; Konstantin Eggert
- Written by: Georgiy Grebner; Anatoli Lunacharsky (play); Prosper Mérimée (novel)
- Starring: Konstantin Eggert; Vera Malinovskaya
- Cinematography: Eduard Tisse; Pyotr Yermolov
- Production company: Mezhrabpomfilm
- Release date: 1925
- Country: Soviet Union
- Languages: Silent; Russian intertitles

The Marriage of the Bear (Russian: Медвежья свадьба, romanized: Medvezhya svadba) (aka The Bear's Wedding) is a 1925 Soviet silent horror-fantasy drama film directed by Konstantin Eggert and Vladimir Gardin. It is based on the play with the same name by Anatoli Lunacharsky, which in turn was based on Prosper Mérimée's novella Lokis (Lithuanian for "bear").

Prosper Mérimée wrote many short stories of which Lokis is one. He was also the author of La Venus d'Ille which Italian horror director Mario Bava adapted to film in 1978. The Russian silent film with its lycanthropic theme predates Universal's later werewolf films, such as The Werewolf of London (1935) and The Wolf Man (1941). But with prints of this film almost impossible to view (although it is said to still exist in a couple of archives), it's difficult to determine if the "man-into-beast" scenes of the film refers to a literal shapeshifter, or if it's just a psychological condition that affects the main character's mind. Despite this claim by critic Troy Howarth that the film is possibly lost there is clear evidence the film screened on television in Russia during the VHS era and a recording of one such broadcast is in circulation. Critic Troy Howarth calls it "possibly the first depiction of a man-into-beast scenario (in a horror film)". However, as stated by film critic Kat Ellinger, who has seen the film, no such transition occurs. The Count's potential status as a lycanthrope is suggested through surreal dream sequences and third party story telling. The film's climax where the bride is killed, is shown only in the aftermath and it is ambiguous as to whether the Count was in bear form when he murdered her. This interpretation is in line with the original Mérimée text, which is also ambiguous.

Mérimée's novella has two other adaptations on film that are known so far: 1971 as Lokis by Polish director Janusz Majewski, and again in 1975 as The Beast by Polish auteur Walerian Borowczyk.

== Plot ==
The Marriage of the Bear (1925)

When a pregnant Russian countess is frightened by a bear, she later gives birth to a male child who acts in some ways like an animal. As the boys matures, he takes to stalking young women in the forest while wearing the skin of a bear. When he becomes an adult, the boy marries a young girl and appears to be normal. But on their honeymoon, he turns into a bear and murders his wife, drinking her blood. But it's not clear whether the transformation is real, or if the young man just believes he is a bear and is acting like one.

== Cast ==
- Konstantin Eggert
- Vera Malinovskaya as Yulka
- B. Afonin
- Varvara Alyokhina as Old Adelina
- Alexander Geirot
- Aleksandra Kartseva as Adelina Shemet
- Galina Kravchenko
- Olga Lenskaya
- Natalya Rozenel
- M. Rozenstein
- N. Stal
- Nikolai Vitovtov
- Vladimir Vladislavskiy
- Ye. Volkonskaya
- Yuri Zavadsky as Olgert

== Bibliography ==
- Liz-Anne Bawden. The Oxford companion to film. Oxford University Press, 1976.
