= Mona Maris =

Argentine actress

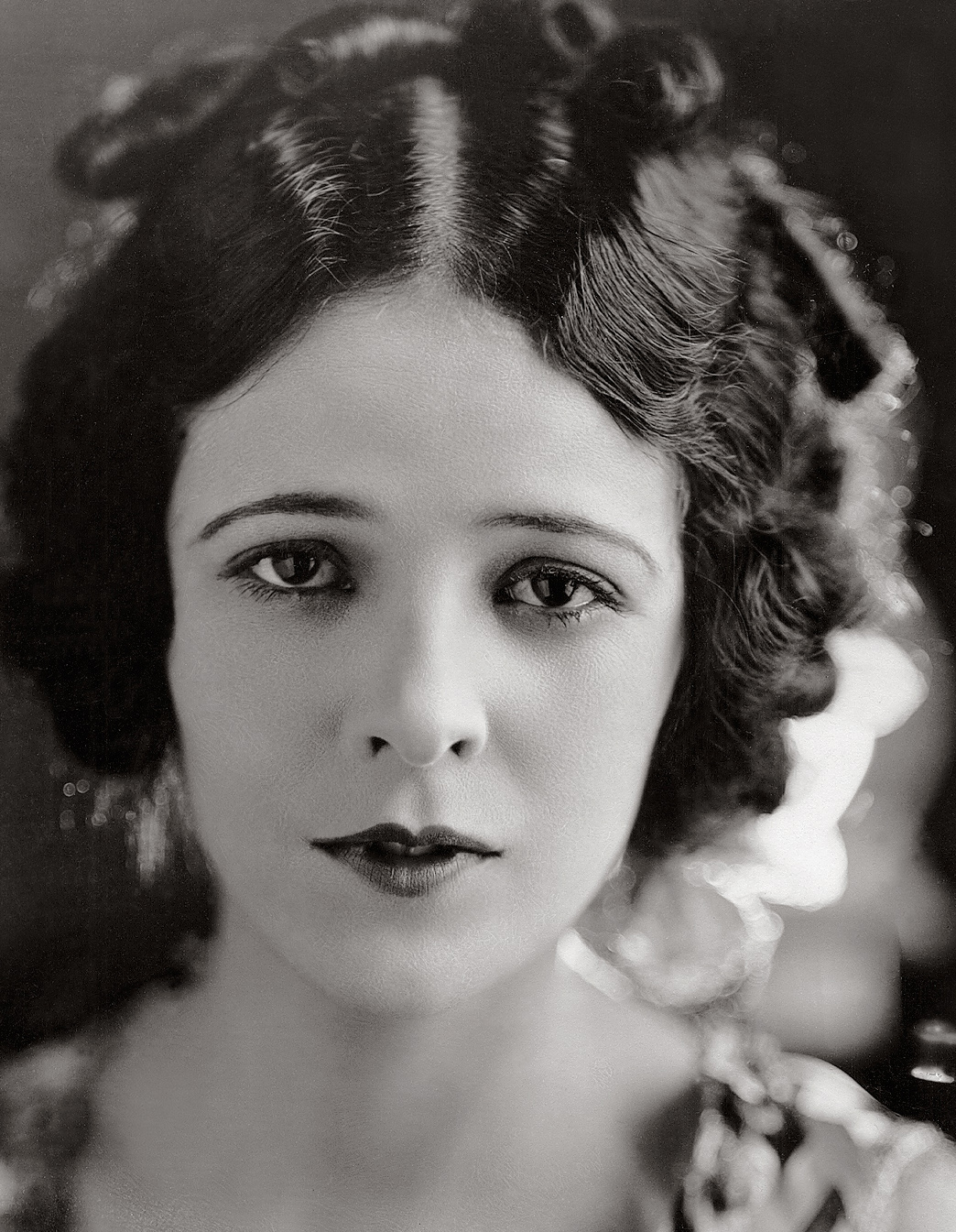
- Born: Mona María Emita Capdevielle or María Rosa Amita Capdevielle; November 7, 1903; Buenos Aires, Argentina
- Died: March 23, 1991 (aged 87); Buenos Aires, Argentina
- Resting place: La Chacarita Cemetery
- Occupation: Actress
- Years active: 1925–1984
- Spouse: Herman Rick (m. 1960; div. 1969)

Mona Maris (born Mona María Emita Capdevielle or María Rosa Amita Capdevielle; November 7, 1903 – March 23, 1991) was an Argentine film actress. Some sources give her full birth name as Rosa Emma Mona María Marta Capdevielle.

== Early life ==
Mona Maris was believed to have been born either as Mona María Emita Capdeville or María Rosa Amita Capdeville (or Cap de Vielle), or María Rosa Amita Capdeville (or Cap de Vielle) Some sources give her full birth name as Rosa Emma Mona María Marta Capdevielle. Her mother was of Basque ancestry and her father was of Catalan ancestry. Orphaned when she was four years old, she lived with her grandmother in France and was educated at a convent there, as well as in England and Germany. By the age of 19, she spoke four languages — French, German, English and Spanish.

In the April 1930 issue of Picture Play magazine, William H. McKegg wrote that Maris "has assimilated much from each country [in which she has lived]—cynical frankness of the French, the simplicity of the Germans—the romanticism of the Italians, and the independence of the English."

== Film career ==
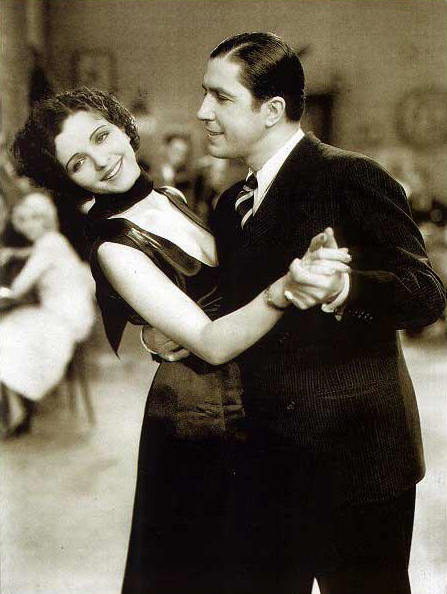
With Carlos Gardel, 1934

Maris' ambition to become an actress originated during World War I, when she was a student in Luders, France. She and her classmates wrote, directed, and presented short plays to entertain soldiers billeted near the school. After graduation Maris begged to go to England and her mother finally relented. In England she found a woman was given much more freedom than in either Spain or South America. She traveled to England under the indirect chaperonage of an Argentine family.

Her stay was intended to last only six months, but was extended another two years. The Argentine ambassador in Berlin received a letter which led to Maris being introduced to the President of the United Film Association. Soon she journeyed to Germany, where she participated in Universum Film AG productions. She was given a screen test during which the camera was not loaded with film. A prominent director noticed Maris and offered her a five-year contract. She counseled with her grandmother, who reluctantly allowed her to accept.

Maris' screen debut was in the German film Los Esclavos del Volga, directed by Richard Eichberg. (The book Hollywood—Se Habla Español says, "Maris' film career began with the 1925 silent movie The Apache", while a 1985 Associated Press newspaper article wrote "She first appeared in the British-made movie, The Little People in 1924.") Jorge Finkielman wrote about her performance in his book, The Film Industry in Argentina: An Illustrated Cultural History: "Her portrayal of the character Tatiana showed that she was an actress who could be expected to turn out noteworthy performances."

Joseph Schenck, president of United Artists, granted her the prospect of a Hollywood career. At the time she had completed just four films in Germany. Her Hollywood film career began with the 1925 movie The Apache.

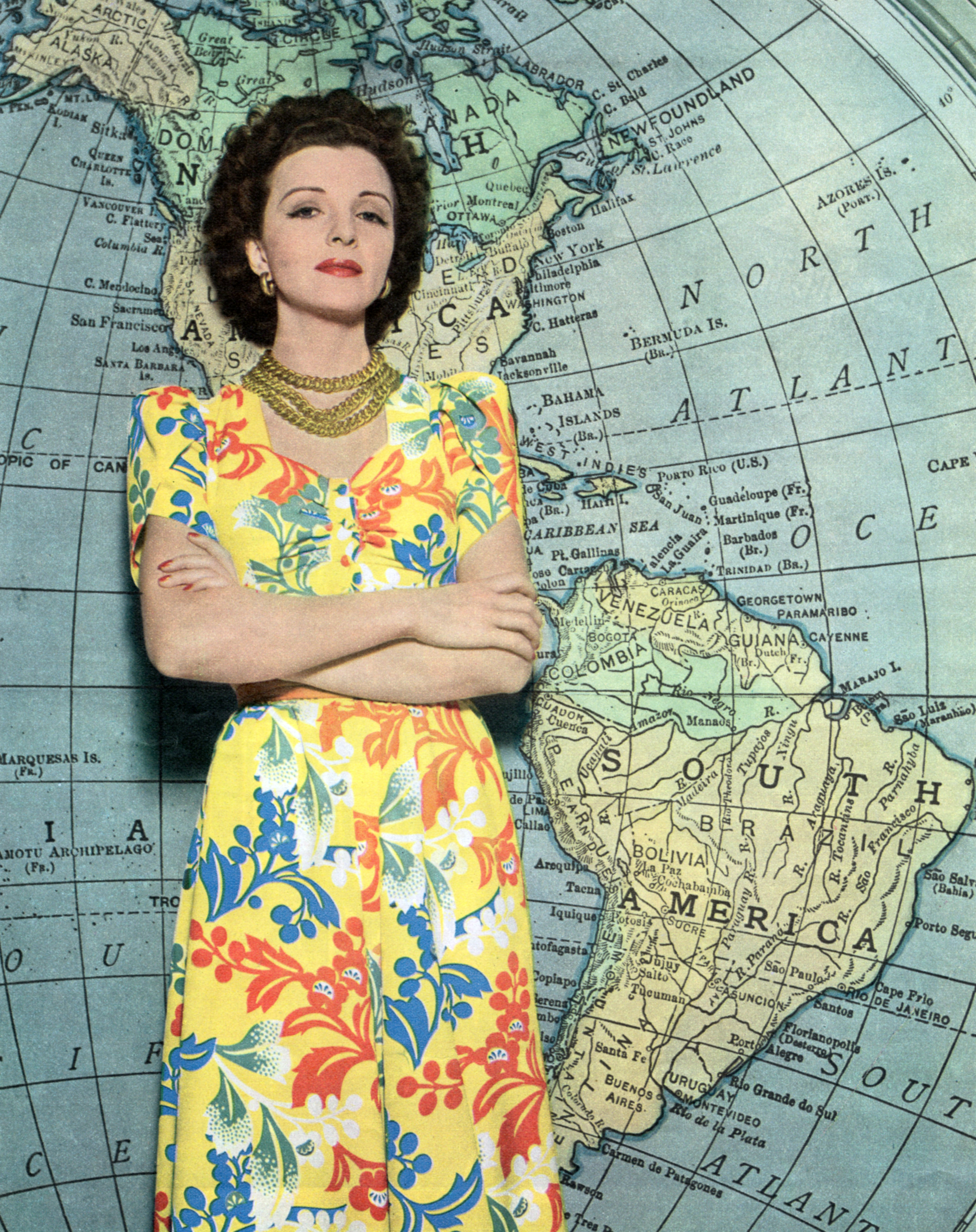
Described by Life as "a living testament to the Good Neighbor Policy", Maris resumed her Hollywood career in 1941 with the film Flight from Destiny, and she informally advised studios on authenticity in films marketed to South America.

Spanish, French, and German came easily for her, but in the early years of sounds films, her English was almost unintelligible. (Note: However, the 1930 article about her in Picture Play magazine contains the comment, "Her English is excellent, although she speaks with an accent.")

From 1931 to 1941, she starred in 19 Spanish-language versions of successful American pictures, which were produced by the Fox Film Company. Maris also appeared in seven English dialogue motion pictures for three studios.

In 1985, Maris described her image as an actress. "They used to hiss whenever I was on screen," she said. "I was always playing the heavy. Here (in Argentina) when they need a heavy, they get an English girl. There (in the United States), when they needed a heavy, it was the Spanish girl."

Maris remained active at age 81, in the role of French aristocrat Marie Anne Périchon de Vandeuil, "a disturbed, broken-hearted grandmother" in the film Camila (1984), which was described as "the most successful Argentine film in decades."

== Personal life ==
She was married twice. Her first marriage took place while she was working in Europe and dissolved before she traveled to the United States. She married Herman Rijck Gelderman in 1960; they divorced in 1969.

She began an affair with Clarence Brown in 1931, and he reportedly proposed to her. Despite multiple sources listing them as being married, they were not, and the affair ended shortly after the proposal, with Maris later saying she ended the relationship because she had her "own ideas of marriage then."

Maris had no children.

== Partial filmography ==
- The Apache (1925) – Lisette Blanchard
- The Prince of Pappenheim (1927) – Prinzessin Antoinette
- The Little People (1927) – Lucia Morelli
- The Prince of Pappenheim (1927) – Prinzessin Antoinette
- The Serfs (1928) – Leibeigene Tatjana, eine Waise
- Spy of Madame Pompadour (1928) – Die Zarin
- Whirl of Youth (1928)
- The Three Women of Urban Hell (1928) – May Lyssenhop
- Romance of the Rio Grande (1929) – Manuelita
- Under a Texas Moon (1930) – Lolita Roberto
- The Arizona Kid (1930) – Lorita
- One Mad Kiss (1930) – Rosario
- El precio de un beso (1930) – Rosario Montes
- Del mismo barro (1930) – Elena Neal
- A Devil with Women (1930) – Rosita Fernandez
- Cuando el amor ríe (1930) – Elvira Alvarado
- Seas Beneath (1931) – Fraulein Lolita
- The Passionate Plumber (1932) – Nina Estrados
- South of the Rio Grande (1932) – Consuela Delgado
- The Man Called Back (1932) – Lilaya
- Once in a Lifetime (1932) – Phyllis Fontaine (uncredited)
- El caballero de la noche (1932) – Lady Elena
- The Death Kiss (1932) – Mrs. Agnes Avery (uncredited)
- Le plombier amoureux (1932)
- Secrets (1933) – Señora Lolita Martinez
- Una viuda romántica (1933) – Estrella Polar
- Forbidden Melody (1933) – Peggy
- No dejes la puerta abierta (1933) – Sra. Lucrecia Delfi
- Yo, tú y ella (1933) – Laura
- White Heat (1934) – Leilani
- Kiss and Make-Up (1934) – Countess Rita
- Downward Slope (1934) – Raquel
- Un capitan de Cosacos (1934) – Olga Nicolaievna
- Tres Amores (1934) – Lola Duval
- The Singer of Naples (1935) – Teresa
- Asegure a su mujer (1935) – Rita Martin
- The Eternal Jew (1940) – Herself
- Flight from Destiny (1941) – Ketti Moret
- Underground (1941) – Fräulein Gessner
- Law of the Tropics (1941) – Rita
- A Date with the Falcon (1942) – Rita Mara
- My Gal Sal (1942) – Countess Mariana Rossini
- Pacific Rendezvous (1942) – Olivia Kerlov
- I Married an Angel (1942) – Marika
- Berlin Correspondent (1942) – Carla
- Tampico (1944) – Dolores Garcia
- The Desert Hawk (1944, Serial) – Princess Azala
- The Falcon in Mexico (1944) – Raquel
- Heartbeat (1946) – Ambassador's Wife
- Monsieur Beaucaire (1946) – Marquisa Velasquez (uncredited)
- The Avengers (1950) – Yvonne
- The Lady of the Camellias (1953)
- Camila (1984) – La Perichona (final film role)

== Sources ==
- Frederick Post, Hollywood, Tuesday Morning, August 26, 1941, p. 4
- Los Angeles Times, "Argentine Film Actress Given Welcome Here", January 1, 1929, p. A1
- Los Angeles Times, "Mona Maris Gives Recipe for Foreign Actress to Get By Successfully in Hollywood", December 29, 1929, p. B11
