= The Green Archer (novel) =

1923 novel by Edgar Wallace

- Author: Edgar Wallace
- Language: English
- Genre: Thriller
- Publisher: Hodder & Stoughton
- Publication date: 1923
- Publication place: United Kingdom
- Media type: Print

The Green Archer is a 1923 thriller novel by the British writer Edgar Wallace. The novel was serialized in The Detective Magazine, Amalgamated Press, London, July 20, 1923-Oct 1, 1924, in 14 parts. The first UK book edition was published by Hodder & Stoughton in London in 1923. The first US book editions were by Small, Maynard & Co, New York, 1924 and by A.L. Burt Co., New York, 1924. Hodder & Stoughton reprinted the book in 1940 and in 1953.

== Plot summary ==
The novel begins with The Daily Globe receiving news that the Green Archer of Garre Castle, hanged in 1487, is back again haunting the castle. The castle’s owner, Abe Bellamy, who had resided in Chicago and was a known criminal, seeks to prevent any investigations of the mysterious return.

Bellamy has never spent a night away from the castle since he purchased it. Valerie seeks to find the identity of her long lost mother.

The first victim of the Green Archer is killed by an arrow in his waistcoat. He had recently had a dispute with Bellamy. The corpse is discovered by Spike Holland, an American reporter who is working for The Daily Globe: “Spike knelt down at the dead man’s side and sought for some sign of life.”

Spike turns over to the police a second green arrow that he finds at the scene of the crime.

James Lamotte Featherstone is a captain from Scotland Yard who investigates Bellamy. He becomes involved in the events after he is hired by a millionaire to keep an eye on his daughter.

== Film adaptation ==
In the United States a silent film serial was released in 1925.

A second serial was produced in 1940 by Columbia Pictures.

In 1961 it was adapted into a West German film The Green Archer, part of a long-running series of Wallace adaptations.

== Bibliography ==
- Goble, Alan. The Complete Index to Literary Sources in Film. Walter de Gruyter, 1999.
