= The Green Archer (1925 serial) =

1925 film

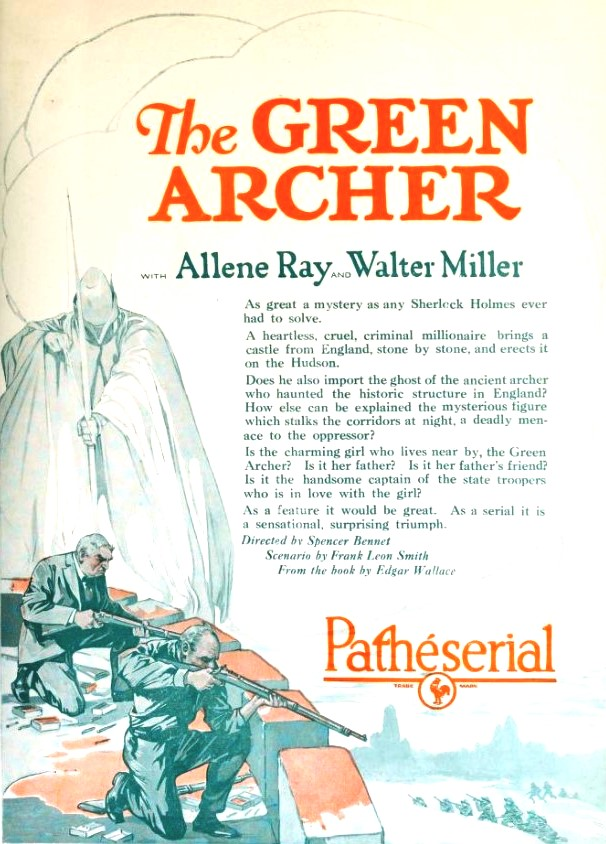
- Film Daily Ad
- Directed by: Spencer Gordon Bennet
- Written by: Frank Leon Smith
- Based on: The Green Archer by Edgar Wallace
- Starring: Allene Ray; Walter Miller
- Cinematography: Linwood G. Dunn
- Distributed by: Pathé Exchange
- Release date: December 6, 1925
- Running time: 10 episodes
- Country: United States
- Language: Silent (English intertitles)

The Green Archer is a ten part 1925 American mystery film serial directed by Spencer Gordon Bennet. It is based on Edgar Wallace's bestselling 1923 novel of the same name. The filmmakers moved the setting of the novel from England to the United States. The story was remade in the sound era as another serial The Green Archer by Columbia Pictures.

The first episode is titled "The Ghost of Bellamy Castle" (released in the U.S. December 6, 1925), and the final one is "The Smoke Clears Away" (released in the U.S. February 27, 1926). The serial was released in the United Kingdom by Pathé Pictures International beginning on October 4, 1926.

Cinematographer Stanley Cortez had one of his earliest jobs as assistant cameraman on the serial. Actress Allene Ray went on to star in a number of other serials such as The Terrible People (1928), Hawk of the Hills (1929) and The Indians Are Coming (1930). Director Bennett also went on to direct many sound serials over the next several decades.

The poster had the tagline "The foreboding shadow of the grim Archer - the twang of the bow - and green feathered Death speeds to its mark!"

Most of the books of Edgar Wallace have been adapted into films many times over the years in both England in the 1930s, and in Germany in the 1960s in a series known as the crimis (see Films based on works by Edgar Wallace).

== Plot ==
As described in a film magazine review, a young woman who believes Abel Bellamy, a recluse millionaire, has kidnaped and for eighteen years has held prisoner another young woman, tries to prove her suspicion by searching the grounds of a medieval castle on the millionaire's estate. The mansion had been moved stone by stone from its original location in England to the United States. Her quest leads her into numerous hazardous adventures and into a romance with a young officer of the state troops. During the hunt several persons are killed by a mysterious archer, whose identity is not learned until the millionaire's castle is finally besieged. The young woman's romance leads to her marriage with the troop officer.

== Cast ==
- Allene Ray as Valerie Howett
- Walter Miller as Jim Featherstone
- Burr McIntosh as Abel Bellamy
- Frank Lackteen as Julius Savini
- Dorothy King as Gay Savini
- Stephen Grattan as Walter Howett
- William R. Randall as John Wood
- Walter P. Lewis as Cold Harbor Smith
- Wally Oettel as Spike Holland
- Tom Cameron as Butler
- Jack Tanner as Creager

== Preservation ==
The film no longer exists in complete form. Only the third, fourth and fifth chapters still exist of the original ten-part serial, preserved in the UCLA Film & Television Archive.

== Chapter titles ==
1. The Ghost of Bellamy Castle
2. The Midnight Warning
3. In the Enemy's Stronghold
4. On the Storm King Road
5. The Affair at the River
6. The Mystery Ship
7. Bellamy Baits a Trap
8. The Cottage in the Woods
9. The Battle Starts
10. The Smoke Clears Away

== See also ==
- List of film serials
- List of film serials by studio
- The Green Archer (1961)
