= List of Paramount British films =

List of films produced in the United Kingdom by the British subsidiary of Paramount Pictures. Initially founded at Islington Studios in the early 1920s, it was later revived following the passage of the 1927 Films Act allowing the company to produce films that qualified for British nationality and were eligible for a quota. During the 1930s the company produced or distributed a mixture of quota quickies and higher budget films.

== 1920s ==
Title	Release date	Director	Notes
The Great Day	November 1920	Hugh Ford	
Appearances	June 1921	Donald Crisp	
The Mystery Road	July 1921	Paul Powell	
The Princess of New York	August 1921	Donald Crisp	
Dangerous Lies	September 1921	Paul Powell	
The Bonnie Brier Bush	November 1921	Donald Crisp	
Three Live Ghosts	January 1922	George Fitzmaurice	
Love's Boomerang	February 1922	John S. Robertson	
The Spanish Jade	April 1922	John S. Robertson	
The Man from Home	April 1922	George Fitzmaurice	
Tell Your Children	September 1922	Donald Crisp	
Madame Pompadour	July 1927	Herbert Wilcox	
Huntingtower	December 1927	George Pearson	
Love's Option	September 1928	George Pearson	Quota quickie
Yellow Stockings	October 1928	Theodore Komisarjevsky	
Spangles	December 1928	George Banfield	
Auld Lang Syne	April 1929	George Pearson	
Power Over Men	April 1929	George Banfield	
The Lady from the Sea	May 1929	Castleton Knight	Quota quickie
The Silver King	May 1929	T. Hayes Hunter	
The Broken Melody	October 1929	Fred Paul	

== 1930s ==
Title	Release date	Director	Notes
Sleeping Partners	March 1930	Seymour Hicks	
The Road to Fortune	August 1930	Arthur Varney	Quota quickie
Cross Roads	August 1930	Reginald Fogwell	Quota quickie
The School for Scandal	September 1930	Maurice Elvey	
Beyond the Cities	September 1930	Carlyle Blackwell	Quota quickie
Guilt	January 1931	Reginald Fogwell	Quota quickie
The Eternal Feminine	February 1931	Arthur Varney	
Contraband Love	April 1931	Sidney Morgan	
The Officers' Mess	May 1931	Manning Haynes	Quota quickie
These Charming People	July 1931	Louis Mercanton	
Her Reputation	July 1931	Sidney Morgan	Quota quickie
A Man of Mayfair	December 1931	Louis Mercanton	
Service for Ladies	January 1932	Alexander Korda	
Ebb Tide	February 1932	Arthur Rosson	Quota quickie
Aren't We All?	March 1932	Harry Lachman	
Life Goes On	March 1932	Jack Raymond	Quota quickie
Women Who Play	March 1932	Arthur Rosson	
Lily Christine	April 1932	Paul L. Stein	
Stamboul	May 1932	Dimitri Buchowetzki	
Down Our Street	June 1932	Harry Lachman	Quota quickie
Insult	July 1932	Harry Lachman	
That Night in London	August 1932	Rowland V. Lee	
Money Means Nothing	September 1932	Herbert Wilcox	Quota quickie
Men of Tomorrow	October 1932	Zoltan Korda, Leontine Sagan	
The Barton Mystery	November 1932	Henry Edwards	Quota quickie
Strange Evidence	January 1933	Robert Milton	Quota quickie
Discord	January 1933	Henry Edwards	
One Precious Year	February 1933	Henry Edwards	
Counsel's Opinion	March 1933	Allan Dwan	
The Crime at Blossoms	March 1933	Maclean Rogers	Quota quickie
Cash	May 1933	Zoltan Korda	
Lord of the Manor	May 1933	Henry Edwards	Quota quickie
Anne One Hundred	June 1933	Henry Edwards	Quota quickie
Purse Strings	July 1933	Henry Edwards	Quota quickie
The Lure	August 1933	Arthur Maude	Quota quickie
A Royal Demand	August 1933	Gustav A. Mindzenti	Quota quickie
Mixed Doubles	September 1933	Sidney Morgan	Quota quickie
The Flaw	October 1933	Norman Walker	Quota quickie
General John Regan	October 1933	Henry Edwards	Quota quickie
The Fear Ship	October 1933	J. Steven Edwards	Quota quickie
The Jewel	October 1933	Reginald Denham	Quota quickie
Chelsea Life	November 1933	Sidney Morgan	Quota quickie
Mrs. Dane's Defence	November 1933	A.V. Bramble	Quota quickie
Ask Beccles	December 1933	Redd Davis	Quota quickie
Faces	January 1934	Sidney Morgan	Quota quickie
Seeing Is Believing	February 1934	Redd Davis	Quota quickie
Lucky Loser	March 1934	Reginald Denham	Quota quickie
Dangerous Ground	May 1934	Norman Walker	Quota quickie
Brides to Be	May 1934	Reginald Denham	Quota quickie
Sometimes Good	June 1934	W.P. Kellino	Quota quickie
The Girl in the Flat	June 1934	Redd Davis	Quota quickie
The Primrose Path	July 1934	Reginald Denham	Quota quickie
To Be a Lady	July 1934	George King	Quota quickie
Get Your Man	August 1934	George King	Quota quickie
Easy Money	August 1934	Redd Davis	Quota quickie
Badger's Green	September 1934	Adrian Brunel	Quota quickie
The Scoop	October 1934	Maclean Rogers	Quota quickie
The Case for the Crown	November 1934	George A. Cooper	Quota quickie
The Way of Youth	November 1934	Norman Walker	Quota quickie
The Price of Wisdom	February 1935	Reginald Denham	Quota quickie
Key to Harmony	March 1935	Norman Walker	Quota quickie
Adventure Ltd.	April 1935	George King	Quota quickie
Gentlemen's Agreement	April 1935	George Pearson	Quota quickie
The Village Squire	April 1935	Reginald Denham	Quota quickie
Once a Thief	June 1935	George Pearson	Quota quickie
Jubilee Window	June 1935	George Pearson	Quota quickie
School for Stars	June 1935	Donovan Pedelty	Quota quickie
Cross Currents	July 1935	Adrian Brunel	Quota quickie
The Mad Hatters	July 1935	Ivar Campbell	Quota quickie
Lucky Days	August 1935	Reginald Denham	Quota quickie
Checkmate	September 1935	George Pearson	Quota quickie
Flame in the Heather	September 1935	Donovan Pedelty	Quota quickie
Expert's Opinion	November 1935	Ivar Campbell	Quota quickie
Ticket of Leave	January 1936	Michael Hankinson	Quota quickie
The Belles of St. Clements	January 1936	Ivar Campbell	Quota quickie
The Secret Voice	February 1936	George Pearson	Quota quickie
Strange Cargo	March 1936	Lawrence Huntington	Quota quickie
Love at Sea	April 1936	Adrian Brunel	Quota quickie
Wednesday's Luck	May 1936	George Pearson	Quota quickie
Two on a Doorstep	May 1936	Lawrence Huntington	Quota quickie
House Broken	June 1936	Michael Hankinson	Quota quickie
Pay Box Adventure	June 1936	W.P. Kellino	Quota quickie
Cafe Mascot	July 1936	Lawrence Huntington	Quota quickie
Murder by Rope	August 1936	George Pearson	Quota quickie
The Early Bird	August 1936	Donovan Pedelty	Quota quickie
Grand Finale	September 1936	Ivar Campbell	Quota quickie
Show Flat	October 1936	Bernard Mainwaring	Quota quickie
Full Speed Ahead	November 1936	Lawrence Huntington	Quota quickie
Irish and Proud of It	November 1936	Donovan Pedelty	Quota quickie
The Scarab Murder Case	November 1936	Michael Hankinson	Quota quickie
Midnight at Madame Tussaud's	December 1936	George Pearson	Quota quickie
Murder at the Cabaret	December 1936	Reginald Fogwell	Quota quickie
Cross My Heart	January 1937	Bernard Mainwaring	Quota quickie
Landslide	January 1937	Donovan Pedelty	Quota quickie
The Elder Brother	February 1937	Frederick Hayward	Quota quickie
Lucky Jade	March 1937	Walter Summers	Quota quickie
The Cavalier of the Streets	March 1937	Harold French	Quota quickie
Holiday's End	March 1937	John Paddy Carstairs	Quota quickie
Behind Your Back	April 1937	Donovan Pedelty	Quota quickie
Museum Mystery	April 1937	Clifford Gulliver	Quota quickie
Double Exposures	May 1937	John Paddy Carstairs	Quota quickie
The Fatal Hour	May 1937	George Pearson	Quota quickie
Night Ride	June 1937	John Paddy Carstairs	Quota quickie
The Last Curtain	July 1937	David MacDonald	Quota quickie
First Night	July 1937	Donovan Pedelty	Quota quickie
Twin Faces	August 1937	Lawrence Huntington	Quota quickie
Under a Cloud	August 1937	George King	Quota quickie
Missing, Believed Married	September 1937	John Paddy Carstairs	Quota quickie
Mr. Smith Carries On	September 1937	Lister Laurance	Quota quickie
False Evidence	October 1937	Donovan Pedelty	Quota quickie
Lancashire Luck	November 1937	Henry Cass	Quota quickie
Incident in Shanghai	January 1938	John Paddy Carstairs	Quota quickie
Silver Top	January 1938	George King	Quota quickie
Murder Tomorrow	February 1938	Donovan Pedelty	Quota quickie
Special Edition	March 1938	Redd Davis	Quota quickie
This Man Is News	September 1938	David MacDonald	
A Royal Divorce	September 1938	Jack Raymond	
Stolen Life	January 1939	Paul Czinner	
The Silent Battle	March 1939	Herbert Mason	
This Man in Paris	July 1939	David MacDonald	
French Without Tears	1939	Anthony Asquith	

== 1940s ==
Title	Release date	Director	Notes
Spy for a Day	April 1940	Mario Zampi	
Quiet Wedding	April 1941	Anthony Asquith	
Hatter's Castle	February 1942	Lance Comfort	
Daughter of Darkness	January 1948	Lance Comfort	
So Evil My Love	March 1948	Lewis Allen	

== 1950s ==
Title	Release date	Director	Notes
Another Time, Another Place	May 1958	Lewis Allen	
Links of Justice	October 1958	Max Varnel	
Three Crooked Men	October 1958	Ernest Morris	
No Safety Ahead	May 1959	Max Varnel	
Web of Suspicion	May 1959	Max Varnel	
Top Floor Girl	May 1959	Max Varnel	
The Man Who Could Cheat Death	November 1959	Terence Fisher	

== 1960s ==
Title	Release date	Director	Notes
Night Train for Inverness	January 1960	Ernest Morris	
Tarzan the Magnificent	July 1960	Robert Day	
The World of Suzie Wong	November 1960	Richard Quine	
Strip Tease Murder	March 1961	Ernest Morris	
Highway to Battle	May 1961	Ernest Morris	
Two Wives at One Wedding	August 1961	Montgomery Tully	
The Durant Affair	May 1962	Godfrey Grayson	
Flight from Singapore	July 1962	Dudley Birch	
Zulu	January 1964	Cy Endfield	
Becket	March 1964	Peter Glenville	
The Amorous Adventures of Moll Flanders	May 1965	Terence Young	
The Spy Who Came in from the Cold	December 1965	Martin Ritt	
Sands of the Kalahari	December 1965	Cy Endfield	
Alfie	March 1966	Lewis Gilbert	
The Psychopath	May 1966	Freddie Francis	
The Spy with a Cold Nose	December 1966	Daniel Petrie	
Funeral in Berlin	December 1966	Guy Hamilton	
The Deadly Bees	December 1966	Freddie Francis	
The Vulture	December 1966	Lawrence Huntington	
Drop Dead Darling	December 1966	Ken Hughes	
Africa: Texas Style	May 1967	Andrew Marton	
Robbery	August 1967	Peter Yates	
The Penthouse	September 1967	Peter Collinson	
The Last Safari	November 1967	Henry Hathaway	
Smashing Time	December 1967	Desmond Davis	
Half a Sixpence	December 1967	George Sidney	
Sebastian	January 1968	David Greene	
Romeo and Juliet	March 1968	Franco Zeffirelli	
The Long Day's Dying	May 1968	Peter Collinson	
Only When I Larf	May 1968	Basil Dearden	
Inadmissible Evidence	June 1968	Anthony Page	
The Strange Affair	July 1968	David Greene	
The Bliss of Mrs. Blossom	September 1968	Joseph McGrath	
Oh! What a Lovely War	March 1969	Richard Attenborough	
Where's Jack?	April 1969	James Clavell	
Monte Carlo or Bust!	June 1969	Ken Annakin	
The Italian Job	June 1969	Peter Collinson	

== 1970s ==
Title	Release date	Director	Notes
Friends	March 1971	Lewis Gilbert	
Unman, Wittering and Zigo	June 1971	John Mackenzie	
Running Scared	May 1972	David Hemmings	

== See also ==
- List of General Film Distributors films
- List of Two Cities Films
- List of British and Dominions films
- List of Gainsborough Pictures films
- List of Ealing Studios films
- List of British Lion films
- List of British National films
- List of Butcher's Film Service films
- List of Stoll Pictures films

== Bibliography ==
- Chibnall, Steve. Quota Quickies: The Birth of the British 'B' Film. British Film Institute, 2007.
- Low, Rachael. Filmmaking in 1930s Britain. George Allen & Unwin, 1985.
- Wood, Linda. British Films, 1927-1939. British Film Institute, 1986.
