= List of British and Dominions films =

This is a list of films released by the British studio British and Dominions Film Corporation between 1928 and 1938. The company was dominated by the producer and director Herbert Wilcox. The company gained a contract to make quota films for release by the British subsidiary of Paramount Pictures and these are also included. All films were made at British and Dominions' Imperial Studios at Elstree unless stated otherwise.

== 1920s ==
| Title | Release date | Director | Notes |
|---|---|---|---|
| Dawn | March 1928 | Herbert Wilcox | Shot at Cricklewood Studios |
| The Triumph of the Scarlet Pimpernel | November 1928 | T. Hayes Hunter | Shot at Cricklewood Studios |
| The Bondman | January 1929 | Herbert Wilcox | Shot at Cricklewood Studios |
| A Peep Behind the Scenes | January 1929 | Jack Raymond | Shot at Cricklewood Studios |
| When Knights Were Bold | February 1929 | Tim Whelan | Shot at Cricklewood Studios |
| Black Waters | April 1929 | Marshall Neilan | Shot in Hollywood in sound |
| The Woman in White | May 1929 | Herbert Wilcox | Shot at Cricklewood Studios |
| Splinters | December 1929 | Jack Raymond | Shot at Blattner Studios and Imperial Studios |

== 1930s ==
| Title | Release date | Director | Notes |
|---|---|---|---|
| Rookery Nook | February 1930 | Tom Walls | Shot at Blattner Studios and Imperial Studios |
| The Loves of Robert Burns | March 1930 | Hebert Wilcox | |
| Wolves | May 1930 | Albert de Courville | Shot at Blattner Studios |
| Warned Off | July 1930 | Walter West | Shot at Cricklewood Studios |
| On Approval | August 1930 | Tom Walls | |
| Canaries Sometimes Sing | 1930 | Tom Walls | |
| Plunder | November 1930 | Tom Walls | |
| Tons of Money | December 1930 | Tom Walls | |
| The Speckled Band | March 1931 | Jack Raymond | |
| The Chance of a Night Time | May 1931 | Herbert Wilcox | |
| Almost a Divorce | August 1931 | Jack Raymond | |
| Carnival | October 1931 | Herbert Wilcox | |
| Mischief | December 1931 | Jack Raymond | |
| Up for the Cup | 1931 | Jack Raymond | |
| The Blue Danube | January 1932 | Herbert Wilcox | |
| A Night Like This | March 1932 | Tom Walls | |
| Aren't We All? | March 1932 | Harry Lachman | |
| Life Goes On | March 1932 | Jack Raymond | |
| Goodnight, Vienna | March 1932 | Herbert Wilcox | |
| The Mayor's Nest | June 1932 | Maclean Rogers | |
| Thark | July 1932 | Tom Walls | |
| The Love Contract | July 1932 | Herbert Selpin | Co-production |
| Money Means Nothing | September 1932 | Herbert Wilcox | |
| Leap Year | October 1932 | Tom Walls | |
| The Flag Lieutenant | October 1932 | Henry Edwards | |
| The Barton Mystery | November 1932 | Henry Edwards | |
| Say It with Music | November 1932 | Jack Raymond | |
| Night of the Garter | 1933 | Jack Raymond | |
| Up to the Neck | 1933 | Jack Raymond | |
| Up for the Derby | 1933 | Maclean Rogers | |
| The King's Cup | January 1933 | Herbert Wilcox | |
| Mixed Doubles | 1933 | Sidney Morgan | |
| Just My Luck | 1933 | Jack Raymond | |
| It's a King | 1933 | Jack Raymond | |
| General John Regan | 1933 | Jack Raymond | |
| Discord | January 1933 | Henry Edwards | |
| Ask Beccles | 1933 | Redd Davis | |
| The Little Damozel | February 1933 | Herbert Wilcox | |
| One Precious Year | February 1933 | Henry Edwards | |
| The Crime at Blossoms | March 1933 | Maclean Rogers | |
| The Blarney Stone | March 1933 | Tom Walls | |
| Bitter Sweet | March 1933 | Herbert Wilcox | |
| Yes, Mr Brown | May 1933 | Jack Buchanan, Herbert Wilcox | |
| Lord of the Manor | May 1933 | Henry Edwards | Shot at British International Pictures Studios |
| Anne One Hundred | June 1933 | Henry Edwards | |
| Summer Lightning | June 1933 | Maclean Rogers | |
| Purse Strings | July 1933 | Henry Edwards | |
| That's a Good Girl | September 1933 | Jack Buchanan | |
| Trouble | November 1933 | Maclean Rogers | |
| Chelsea Life | November 1933 | Sidney Morgan | |
| Sorrell and Son | December 1933 | Jack Raymond | |
| The King of Paris | 1934 | Jack Raymond | |
| Lilies of the Field | 1934 | Norman Walker | |
| Faces | January 1934 | Sidney Morgan | |
| The Queen's Affair | February 1934 | Hebert Wilcox | |
| Seeing Is Believing | February 1934 | Redd Davis | |
| Lucky Loser | March 1934 | Reginald Denham | |
| It's a Cop | March 1934 | Redd Davis | |
| Dangerous Ground | May 1934 | Norman Walker | |
| Brides to Be | May 1934 | Reginald Denham | |
| The Girl in the Flat | June 1934 | Redd Davis | |
| To Be a Lady | July 1934 | George King | |
| Girls, Please! | July 1934 | Jack Raymond | |
| Nell Gwynn | August 1934 | Herbert Wilcox | |
| Get Your Man | August 1934 | George King | |
| Easy Money | August 1934 | Redd Davis | |
| Badger's Green | September 1934 | Adrian Brunel | |
| The Scoop | October 1934 | Maclean Rogers | |
| The Case for the Crown | November 1934 | George A. Cooper | |
| The Way of Youth | November 1934 | Norman Walker | |
| The Primrose Path | 1934 | Reginald Denham | |
| Gentlemen's Agreement | 1935 | George Pearson | |
| Brewster's Millions | January 1935 | Thornton Freeland | |
| The Price of Wisdom | February 1935 | Reginald Denham | |
| Key to Harmony | March 1935 | Norman Walker | |
| Escape Me Never | April 1935 | Paul Czinner | |
| Adventure Limited | April 1935 | George King | |
| The Village Squire | April 1935 | Reginald Denham | |
| Once a Thief | June 1935 | George Pearson | |
| Jubilee Window | June 1935 | George Pearson | |
| School for Stars | June 1935 | Donovan Pedelty | |
| The Mad Hatters | July 1935 | Ivar Campbell | |
| Cross Currents | July 1935 | Adrian Brunel | |
| Where's George? | August 1935 | Jack Raymond | |
| Peg of Old Drury | August 1935 | Herbert Wilcox | |
| Lucky Days | August 1935 | Reginald Denham | |
| While Parents Sleep | September 1935 | Adrian Brunel | |
| Checkmate | September 1935 | George Pearson | |
| Come Out of the Pantry | November 1935 | Jack Raymond | |
| Expert's Opinion | November 1935 | Ivar Campbell | |
| The Belles of St. Clements | January 1936 | Ivar Campbell | |
| Ticket of Leave | January 1936 | Michael Hankinson | |
| The Secret Voice | February 1937 | George Pearson | |
| Strange Cargo | March 1936 | Lawrence Huntington | |
| Two's Company | April 1936 | Tim Whelan | |
| Wednesday's Luck | May 1936 | George Pearson | |
| Two on a Doorstep | May 1936 | Lawrence Huntington | Shot at Rock Studios |
| House Broken | June 1936 | Michael Hankinson | Shot at Rock Studios |
| Pay Box Adventure | June 1936 | W.P. Kellino | Shot at J.H. Studios |
| Murder by Rope | August 1936 | George Pearson | Shot at Shepperton Studios |
| Chick | September 1936 | Michael Hankinson | Shot at J.H. Studios |
| Grand Finale | September 1936 | Ivar Campbell | Shot at Shepperton Studios |
| Show Flat | October 1936 | Bernard Mainwaring | Shot at Shepperton Studios |
| The Scarab Murder Case | November 1936 | Michael Hankinson | Shot at Pinewood Studios |
| Talk of the Devil | December 1936 | Carol Reed | Shot at Pinewood Studios |
| Holiday's End | 1937 | John Paddy Carstairs | Shot at Pinewood Studios |
| Cross My Heart | January 1937 | Bernard Mainwaring | Shot at Pinewood Studios |
| The Cavalier of the Streets | March 1937 | Harold French | Shot at Pinewood Studios |
| Museum Mystery | April 1937 | Clifford Gulliver | Shot at Pinewood Studios |
| The Fatal Hour | May 1937 | George Pearson | Shot at Pinewood Studios |
| Night Ride | June 1937 | John Paddy Carstairs | Shot at Pinewood Studios |
| The Last Curtain | July 1937 | David MacDonald | Shot at Pinewood Studios |
| Missing, Believed Married | September 1937 | John Paddy Carstairs | Shot at Pinewood Studios |
| Mr. Smith Carries On | September 1937 | Lister Laurance | Shot at Pinewood Studios |
| Lancashire Luck | November 1937 | Henry Cass | Shot at Pinewood Studios |
| Incident in Shanghai | January 1938 | John Paddy Carstairs | Shot at Pinewood Studios |

== See also ==
- List of Gainsborough Pictures films
- List of Ealing Studios films
- List of Stoll Pictures films
- List of British Lion films
- List of Two Cities Films
- List of British National films
- List of General Film Distributors films
- List of Paramount British films
- British and Dominions Imperial Studios § Films shot at Imperial Studios

== Bibliography ==
- Low, Rachael. History of the British Film, 1918-1929. George Allen & Unwin, 1971.
- Wood, Linda. British Films, 1927–1939 . British Film Institute, 1986.
