= List of Stoll Pictures films =

This is a list of films released by the British studio Stoll Pictures, one of the largest European studios of the 1920s. It excludes films made in other countries but distributed in the United Kingdom by Stoll.

== 1910s ==
Title	Release date	Director	Notes
Once Upon a Time	May 1918	Thomas Bentley	
All the Sad World Needs	July 1918	Hubert Herrick	
George Robey's Day Off	December 1918	E.P. Kinsella, Kewpie Morgan	
Comradeship	January 1919	Maurice Elvey	
Keeper of the Door	March 1919	Maurice Elvey	
The Rocks of Valpre	June 1919	Maurice Elvey	
God's Good Man	August 1919	Maurice Elvey	
Mr. Wu	October 1919	Maurice Elvey	
The Swindler	December 1919	Maurice Elvey	
The Garden of Resurrection	December 1919	Arthur Rooke	
The Elusive Pimpernel	December 1919	Maurice Elvey	

== 1920s ==
Title	Release date	Director	Notes
The Lure of Crooning Water	January 1920	Arthur Rooke	
The Barton Mystery	February 1920	Harry T. Roberts	
The Amateur Gentleman	March 1920	Maurice Elvey	
At the Villa Rose	March 1920	Maurice Elvey	
The Iron Stair	May 1920	F. Martin Thornton	
The Hundredth Chance	June 1920	Maurice Elvey	
Duke's Son	June 1920	Franklin Dyall	
The Flame	July 1920	F. Martin Thornton	
The Tidal Wave	August 1920	Sinclair Hill	
A Question of Trust	August 1920	Maurice Elvey	
The Tavern Knight	September 1920	Maurice Elvey	
Testimony	October 1920	Guy Newall	
Bars of Iron	November 1920	F. Martin Thornton	
The Yellow Claw	December 1920	René Plaissetty	
The Town of Crooked Ways	December 1920	Bert Wynne	
The Mirage	December 1920	Arthur Rooke	
Kipps	January 1921	Harold M. Shaw	
My Lord Conceit	February 1921	F. Martin Thornton	
Innocent	March 1921	Maurice Elvey	
The Yellow Face	April 1921	Maurice Elvey	Part of the Sherlock Holmes series
The Tiger of San Pedro	April 1921	Maurice Elvey	Part of the Sherlock Holmes series
The Solitary Cyclist	April 1921	Maurice Elvey	Part of the Sherlock Holmes series
The Resident Patient	April 1921	Maurice Elvey	Part of the Sherlock Holmes series
The Red-Haired League	April 1921	Maurice Elvey	Part of the Sherlock Holmes series
The Priory School	April 1921	Maurice Elvey	Part of the Sherlock Holmes series
The Noble Bachelor	April 1921	Maurice Elvey	Part of the Sherlock Holmes series
The Man with the Twisted Lip	April 1921	Maurice Elvey	Part of the Sherlock Holmes series
The Empty House	April 1921	Maurice Elvey	Part of the Sherlock Holmes series
The Dying Detective	April 1921	Maurice Elvey	Part of the Sherlock Holmes series
The Devil's Foot	April 1921	Maurice Elvey	Part of the Sherlock Holmes series
The Copper Beeches	April 1921	Maurice Elvey	Part of the Sherlock Holmes series
The Beryl Coronet	April 1921	Maurice Elvey	Part of the Sherlock Holmes series
A Scandal in Bohemia	April 1921	Maurice Elvey	Part of the Sherlock Holmes series
A Case of Identity	April 1921	Maurice Elvey	Part of the Sherlock Holmes series
The Four Just Men	May 1921	George Ridgwell	
The Four Feathers	May 1921	René Plaissetty	
The Place of Honour	June 1921	Sinclair Hill	
The Broken Road	June 1921	René Plaissetty	
The Amazing Partnership	June 1921	George Ridgwell	
Greatheart	June 1921	George Ridgwell	
A Gentleman of France	June 1921	Maurice Elvey	
The Woman with the Fan	July 1921	René Plaissetty	
The Woman of His Dream	July 1921	Harold M. Shaw	
The Tragedy of a Comic Song	July 1921	Maurice Elvey	
The Knave of Diamonds	July 1921	René Plaissetty	
Frailty	July 1921	F. Martin Thornton	
A Dear Fool	July 1921	Harold M. Shaw	
The River of Stars	August 1921	F. Martin Thornton	
The Hound of the Baskervilles	August 1921	Maurice Elvey	Feature film based on Sherlock Holmes series
The Bigamist	August 1921	Guy Newall	
The Prey of the Dragon	September 1921	F. Martin Thornton	
The Fruitful Vine	September 1921	Maurice Elvey	
General John Regan	October 1921	Harold M. Shaw	
The Mystery of Mr. Bernard Brown	November 1921	Sinclair Hill	
Gwyneth of the Welsh Hills	November 1921	F. Martin Thornton	
A Romance of Wastdale	November 1921	Maurice Elvey	
Froggy's Little Brother	December 1921	A.E. Coleby	
The Passionate Friends	January 1922	Maurice Elvey	
The Glorious Adventure	January 1922	J. Stuart Blackton	
Lamp in the Desert	January 1922	F. Martin Thornton	
Beauty and the Beast	January 1922	Guy Newall	
The Knight Errant	February 1922	George Ridgwell	
The Stockbroker's Clerk	March 1922	George Ridgwell	Part of the Sherlock Holmes series
The Six Napoleons	March 1922	George Ridgwell	Part of the Sherlock Holmes series
The Second Stain	March 1922	George Ridgwell	Part of the Sherlock Holmes series
The Reigate Squires	March 1922	George Ridgwell	Part of the Sherlock Holmes series
The Red Circle	March 1922	George Ridgwell	Part of the Sherlock Holmes series
The Norwood Builder	March 1922	George Ridgwell	Part of the Sherlock Holmes series
The Naval Treaty	March 1922	George Ridgwell	Part of the Sherlock Holmes series
The Musgrave Ritual	March 1922	George Ridgwell	Part of the Sherlock Holmes series
The Greek Interpreter	March 1922	George Ridgwell	Part of the Sherlock Holmes series
The Golden Pince-Nez	March 1922	George Ridgwell	Part of the Sherlock Holmes series
The Bruce-Partington Plans	March 1922	George Ridgwell	Part of the Sherlock Holmes series
The Boscombe Valley Mystery	March 1922	George Ridgwell	Part of the Sherlock Holmes series
The Abbey Grange	March 1922	George Ridgwell	Part of the Sherlock Holmes series
Charles Augustus Milverton	March 1922	George Ridgwell	Part of the Sherlock Holmes series
Black Peter	March 1922	George Ridgwell	Part of the Sherlock Holmes series
The Recoil	March 1922	Geoffrey H. Malins	
The Peacemaker	March 1922	A.E. Coleby	
False Evidence	March 1922	Harold M. Shaw	
Belonging	March 1922	F. Martin Thornton	
The Persistent Lovers	April 1922	Guy Newall	
Little Brother of God	April 1922	F. Martin Thornton	
Long Odds	May 1922	A.E. Coleby	
Boy Woodburn	May 1922	Guy Newall	
The Wheels of Chance	June 1922	Harold M. Shaw	
The Pointing Finger	June 1922	George Ridgwell	
Melody of Death	June 1922	F. Martin Thornton	
Half a Truth	June 1922	Sinclair Hill	
The Truants	July 1922	Sinclair Hill	
Fox Farm	July 1922	Guy Newall	
Man and His Kingdom	August 1922	Maurice Elvey	
The Experiment	September 1922	Sinclair Hill	
Running Water	September 1922	Maurice Elvey	
Down Under Donovan	September 1922	Harry Lambart	
Dick Turpin's Ride to York	September 1922	Maurice Elvey	
A Lost Leader	September 1922	George Ridgwell	
The Eleventh Hour	October 1922	George Ridgwell	
Expiation	October 1922	Sinclair Hill	
The Nonentity	November 1922	Sinclair Hill	
The Missioner	November 1922	George Ridgwell	
A Maid of the Silver Sea	November 1922	Guy Newall	
The Scourge	December 1922	Geoffrey H. Malins	
Open Country	December 1922	Sinclair Hill	
A Debt of Honour	December 1922	Maurice Elvey	
Petticoat Loose	1922	George Ridgwell	
The West Case	1923	A.E. Coleby	Part of the Fu Manchu series
The Silver Buddha	1923	A.E. Coleby	Part of the Fu Manchu series
The Shrine of the Seven Lamps	1923	A.E. Coleby	Part of the Fu Manchu series
The Scented Envelopes	1923	A.E. Coleby	Part of the Fu Manchu series
The Sacred Order	1923	A.E. Coleby	Part of the Fu Manchu series
The Queen of Hearts	1923	A.E. Coleby	Part of the Fu Manchu series
The Miracle	1923	A.E. Coleby	Part of the Fu Manchu series
Man with the Limp	1923	A.E. Coleby	Part of the Fu Manchu series
The Knocking on the Door	1923	A.E. Coleby	Part of the Fu Manchu series
The Fungi Cellars	1923	A.E. Coleby	Part of the Fu Manchu series
The Fiery Hand	1923	A.E. Coleby	Part of the Fu Manchu series
The Cry of the Night Hawk	1923	A.E. Coleby	Part of the Fu Manchu series
The Clue of the Pigtail	1923	A.E. Coleby	Part of the Fu Manchu series
The Call of Siva	1923	A.E. Coleby	Part of the Fu Manchu series
Aaron's Rod	1923	A.E. Coleby	Part of the Fu Manchu series
The Prodigal Son	February 1923	A.E. Coleby	
The Three Students	March 1923	George Ridgwell	Part of the Sherlock Holmes series
The Stone of Mazarin	March 1923	George Ridgwell	Part of the Sherlock Holmes series
The Speckled Band	March 1923	George Ridgwell	Part of the Sherlock Holmes series
The Mystery of Thor Bridge	March 1923	George Ridgwell	Part of the Sherlock Holmes series
The Mystery of the Dancing Men	March 1923	George Ridgwell	Part of the Sherlock Holmes series
The Missing Three-Quarter	March 1923	George Ridgwell	Part of the Sherlock Holmes series
The Gloria Scott	March 1923	George Ridgwell	Part of the Sherlock Holmes series
The Final Problem	March 1923	George Ridgwell	Part of the Sherlock Holmes series
The Engineer's Thumb	March 1923	George Ridgwell	Part of the Sherlock Holmes series
The Disappearance of Lady Frances Carfax	March 1923	George Ridgwell	Part of the Sherlock Holmes series
The Crooked Man	March 1923	George Ridgwell	Part of the Sherlock Holmes series
The Cardboard Box	March 1923	George Ridgwell	Part of the Sherlock Holmes series
The Blue Carbuncle	March 1923	George Ridgwell	Part of the Sherlock Holmes series
Silver Blaze	March 1923	George Ridgwell	Part of the Sherlock Holmes series
His Last Bow	March 1923	George Ridgwell	Part of the Sherlock Holmes series
The Cause of all the Trouble	May 1923	Edward Dryhurst	
The Wandering Jew	June 1923	Maurice Elvey	
The Sign of Four	June 1923	Maurice Elvey	Feature film based on Sherlock Holmes series
The Starlit Garden	July 1923	Guy Newall	
The Indian Love Lyrics	July 1923	Sinclair Hill	
Guy Fawkes	September 1923	Maurice Elvey	
Young Lochinvar	October 1923	W.P. Kellino	
The Royal Oak	October 1923	Maurice Elvey	
The Rest Cure	October 1923	A.E. Coleby	
Becket	October 1923	George Ridgwell	
Sally Bishop	December 1923	Maurice Elvey	based on the novel Sally Bishop, a Romance by E. Temple Thurston
One Arabian Night	December 1923	Sinclair Hill	
Don Quixote	December 1923	Maurice Elvey	
The Colleen Bawn	January 1924	W.P. Kellino	
The Prehistoric Man	March 1924	A.E. Coleby	
Henry, King of Navarre	March 1924	Maurice Elvey	
Tons of Money	March 1924	Frank Hall Crane	
Slaves of Destiny	April 1924	Maurice Elvey	
The Great Prince Shan	May 1924	A.E. Coleby	
The Conspirators	May 1924	Sinclair Hill	
His Grace Gives Notice	May 1924	W.P. Kellino	
The York Mystery	July 1924	Hugh Croise	Part of the "Old Man in the Corner" series
The Tremarne Case	July 1924	Hugh Croise	Part of the "Old Man in the Corner" series
The Tragedy at Barnsdale Manor	July 1924	Hugh Croise	Part of the "Old Man in the Corner" series
The Regent's Park Mystery	July 1924	Hugh Croise	Part of the "Old Man in the Corner" series
The Northern Mystery	July 1924	Hugh Croise	Part of the "Old Man in the Corner" series
The Mystery of the Khaki Tunic	July 1924	Hugh Croise	Part of the "Old Man in the Corner" series
The Mystery of Dogstooth Cliff	July 1924	Hugh Croise	Part of the "Old Man in the Corner" series
The Mystery of Brudenell Court	July 1924	Hugh Croise	Part of the "Old Man in the Corner" series
The Kensington Mystery	July 1924	Hugh Croise	Part of the "Old Man in the Corner" series
The Hocussing of Cigarette	July 1924	Hugh Croise	Part of the "Old Man in the Corner" series
The Brighton Mystery	July 1924	Hugh Croise	Part of the "Old Man in the Corner" series
The Affair at the Novelty Theatre	July 1924	Hugh Croise	Part of the "Old Man in the Corner" series
The Notorious Mrs. Carrick	July 1924	George Ridgwell	
The Mating of Marcus	July 1924	W.P. Kellino	
Sen Yan's Devotion	July 1924	A.E. Coleby	
The Drum	July 1924	Sinclair Hill	Part of the "Thrilling Stories from the Strand Magazine" series
The Cavern Spider	July 1924	Thomas Bentley	Part of the "Thrilling Stories from the Strand Magazine" series
The Acid Test	July 1924	Sinclair Hill	Part of the "Thrilling Stories from the Strand Magazine" series
Holloway's Treasure	July 1924	Sinclair Hill	Part of the "Thrilling Stories from the Strand Magazine" series
Fighting Snub Reilly	July 1924	Andrew P. Wilson	Part of the "Thrilling Stories from the Strand Magazine" series
After Dark	July 1924	Thomas Bentley	Part of the "Thrilling Stories from the Strand Magazine" series
Chappy: That's All	July 1924	Thomas Bentley	
White Slippers	August 1924	Sinclair Hill	
The Love Story of Aliette Brunton	August 1924	Maurice Elvey	
The Midnight Summons	August 1924	Fred Paul	Part of the Fu Manchu series
The Green Mist	August 1924	Fred Paul	Part of the Fu Manchu series
The Golden Pomegranates	August 1924	Fred Paul	Part of the Fu Manchu series
The Coughing Horror	August 1924	Fred Paul	Part of the Fu Manchu series
The Cafe L'Egypte	August 1924	Fred Paul	Part of the Fu Manchu series
Karamaneh	August 1924	Fred Paul	Part of the Fu Manchu series
Greywater Park	August 1924	Fred Paul	Part of the Fu Manchu series
Cragmire Tower	August 1924	Fred Paul	Part of the Fu Manchu series
The Sins Ye Do	October 1924	Fred LeRoy Granville	
The Clicking of Cuthbert	October 1924	Andrew P. Wilson	Part of "The Clicking of Cuthbert" series
The Magic Plus Fours	October 1924	Andrew P. Wilson	Part of "The Clicking of Cuthbert" series
The Long Hole	October 1924	Andrew P. Wilson	Part of "The Clicking of Cuthbert" series
Rodney Fails to Qualify	October 1924	Andrew P. Wilson	Part of "The Clicking of Cuthbert" series
Ordeal by Golf	October 1924	Andrew P. Wilson	Part of "The Clicking of Cuthbert" series
Chester Forgets Himself	October 1924	Andrew P. Wilson	Part of "The Clicking of Cuthbert" series
Not for Sale	October 1924	W.P. Kellino	
The Flying Fifty-Five	November 1924	A.E. Coleby	
The Perfect Crime	January 1925	Walter Summers	Short film
The Honourable Member for the Outside Left	January 1925	Sinclair Hill	Short film
Ragan in Ruins	January 1925	Fred Paul	Short film
A Madonna of the Cells	January 1925	Fred Paul	Short film
A Dear Liar	January 1925	Fred LeRoy Granville	Short film
We Women	February 1925	W.P. Kellino	
Money Isn't Everything	February 1925	Thomas Bentley	
A Daughter of Love	February 1925	Walter West	
The Presumption of Stanley Hay, MP	April 1925	Sinclair Hill	
A Romance of Mayfair	April 1925	Thomas Bentley	
The Squire of Long Hadley	May 1925	Sinclair Hill	
Confessions	May 1925	W.P. Kellino	
The Secret Kingdom	August 1925	Sinclair Hill	
The Last Witness	August 1925	Fred Paul	
King of the Castle	August 1925	Henry Edwards	
The Gold Cure	October 1925	W.P. Kellino	
A Girl of London	October 1925	Henry Edwards	
The Qualified Adventurer	March 1926	Sinclair Hill	
The Wonderful Wooing	April 1926	Geoffrey H. Malins	
Sahara Love	October 1926	Sinclair Hill	
Safety First	November 1926	Fred Paul	
Pearl of the South Seas	November 1926	Frank Hurley	
One Colombo Night	November 1926	Henry Edwards	
The Chinese Bungalow	November 1926	Sinclair Hill	
The Island of Despair	December 1926	Henry Edwards	
Thou Fool	December 1926	Fred Paul	
Jungle Woman	December 1926	Frank Hurley	
A Woman Redeemed	August 1927	Sinclair Hill	
The King's Highway	October 1927	Sinclair Hill	
The Guns of Loos	February 1928	Sinclair Hill	
The Price of Divorce	October 1928	Sinclair Hill	

== 1930s ==
Title	Release date	Director	Notes
Such Is the Law	November 1930	Sinclair Hill	
The Great Gay Road	October 1931	Sinclair Hill	
Dick Turpin	November 1933	Victor Hanbury, John Stafford	

== See also ==
- List of Two Cities Films
- List of British and Dominions films
- List of Gainsborough Pictures films
- List of Ealing Studios films
- List of British Lion films
- List of British National films
- List of General Film Distributors films
- List of Paramount British films

== Bibliography ==
- Low, Rachael. History of the British Film, 1918-1929. George Allen & Unwin, 1971.
