= Lloyd Pearson =

English actor (1897–1966)

- Pearson's 1939 Spotlight picture (sketch by Kay Stewart)
- Born: Lloyd Mawson Pearson; 13 December 1897; Cleckheaton, Yorkshire, England
- Died: 2 June 1966 (aged 68); London, England
- Occupation(s): Stage and screen actor

Lloyd Mawson Pearson (13 December 1897 – 2 June 1966) was an English actor, who appeared mostly in character roles on stage and screen. He created the roles of Rat in Toad of Toad Hall in 1929 and Alderman Helliwell in the West End production of J. B. Priestley's When We Are Married in 1938, a role he reprised in the film version in 1943.

== Life and career ==
Pearson was born in Cleckheaton, near Batley in the West Riding of Yorkshire, the son of William Edward Pearson and his wife Ada, né Farrar. He was educated at Whitcliffe Mount Grammar School and Owen's College. He then became a clerk in the Midland Bank. After serving in the armed forces in the First World War he studied for the stage at Lady Benson's Dramatic School and made his first appearance on the stage at the Palace Pier, Brighton in 1919 as the Police Officer in Diana of Dobson's. He made his first appearance in London at the St Martin's Theatre on 21 January 1920, as Lentulus in Pompey the Great, with Sir Frank Benson and remained with the Benson company for seven years, eventually playing the leading comedy parts in Shakespeare, Sheridan, Goldsmith and others. He then played a short season with the Birmingham Repertory Company, where he appeared as Launce in The Two Gentlemen of Verona. In 1927 he joined the company of the Playhouse Theatre, Liverpool, under William Armstrong, and remained until 1937, playing leading parts, including the Water Rat in the word premiere of Toad of Toad Hall.

He returned to London in 1937 and appeared as Viscount Pascal in The Switchback, Tubby Pearson in Dodsworth, Harper in Nanny, and at the St Martin's in October 1938 he played Alderman Helliwell in the premiere of When We Are Married. In the later 1930s and 1940s he played mostly in modern comedies, including Arsenic and Old Lace (1944). At the Phoenix Theatre in May 1949 he made a rare excursion into costume drama, playing Gibbet in The Beaux' Stratagem, which ran for over a year. Later West End appearances included Mr Marsland in a revival of The Private Secretary (1954) and the Fire Brigade Captain in The Bald Prima Donna. In 1957 he took over the role of the Tramp in Salad Days for two and a half years.

Pearson died in London on 2 June 1966 aged 68.

=== Films ===
In addition to his stage career, Pearson acted in films from 1938 to 1964:

Year	Title	Role	Notes
1938	Incident in Shanghai		
1938	The Challenge	Seiler	
1938	Penny Paradise		
1940	Let George Do It!	Hotel Manager	Uncredited
1940	Tilly of Bloomsbury		Uncredited
1941	Kipps	Shalford	
1942	Banana Ridge	Mr. Bingley	
1942	The Day Will Dawn	Wettau's Assistant	Uncredited
1942	Uncensored	Cabaret Manager	Uncredited
1942	The Goose Steps Out	Train Passenger	Uncredited
1942	The Young Mr. Pitt	Minor Role	Uncredited
1943	When We Are Married	Joe Helliwell	
1943	Rhythm Serenade	Mr. Simkins	
1943	Schweik's New Adventures	Josef Schweik	
1943	My Learned Friend	Col. Chudleigh	
1944	Time Flies	Publican	Uncredited
1944	The Way Ahead	Thyrtle	
1945	The Agitator	Derek Cunlyffe	
1948	The Three Weird Sisters	Solicitor	
1948	Bond Street	Drunken Client	Uncredited
1948	Mr. Perrin and Mr. Traill	Mr. Dormer	
1949	Passport to Pimlico	Fawcett	
1949	Dear Mr. Prohack	Mr. Bishop	Uncredited
1949	Under Capricorn	Land Agent	Uncredited
1950	Portrait of Clare	Sir Joseph Hingston	
1952	Private Information	Mayor	
1952	Hindle Wakes	Tim Farrer	
1957	The Good Companions	Mr. Tarvin	
1960	The Angry Silence	Howarth	
1964	A Jolly Bad Fellow	Dr. Rossiter	

== Sources ==
- Gaye, Freda, ed. (1967). Who's Who in the Theatre (fourteenth ed.). London: Sir Isaac Pitman and Sons. OCLC 5997224.
