= List of General Film Distributors films =

This is a list of films released by the British distribution company General Film Distributors. GFD was part of the Rank Organisation, and handled films produced by the various companies controlled by or linked to Rank including Gainsborough Pictures, Two Cities Films and Ealing Studios. The list also includes films released by Rank's other distribution outlet Eagle-Lion Films. Foreign films which were handled in Britain by GFD, such as imports from the Hollywood studio Universal Pictures, are not included. In 1955 GFD was abolished and replaced by Rank Film Distributors.

== 1930s ==
Title	Release date	Director	Notes
Koenigsmark	October 1935	Maurice Tourneur	
Moscow Nights	November 1935	Anthony Asquith	
No Monkey Business	November 1935	Marcel Varnel	
The Mystery of the Mary Celeste	November 1935	Denison Clift	
The Improper Duchess	January 1936	Harry Hughes	
Limelight	January 1936	Herbert Wilcox	
When Knights Were Bold	February 1936	Jack Raymond	
Public Nuisance No. 1	February 1936	Marcel Varnel	
King of the Castle	February 1936	Redd Davis	
Fame	March 1936	Leslie S. Hiscott	
Wolf's Clothing	March 1936	Andrew Marton	
The Crimson Circle	March 1936	Reginald Denham	
Debt of Honour	March 1936	Norman Walker	
Birds of a Feather	April 1936	John Baxter	
The Marriage of Corbal	May 1936	Karl Grune	
The Three Maxims	June 1936	Herbert Wilcox	
Dishonour Bright	September 1936	Tom Walls	
Southern Roses	September 1936	Frederic Zelnik	
Secret of Stamboul	October 1936	Andrew Marton	
Land Without Music	October 1936	Walter Forde	
Tropical Trouble	October 1936	Harry Hughes	
This'll Make You Whistle	November 1936	Herbert Wilcox	
You Must Get Married	December 1936	Leslie Pearce	
Splinters in the Air	1937	Alfred J. Goulding	
Sunset in Vienna	1937	Norman Walker	
Millions	1937	Leslie S. Hiscott	
London Melody	February 1937	Herbert Wilcox	
For Valour	March 1937	Tom Walls	
The Frog	March 1937	Jack Raymond	
The Gang Show	April 1937	Alfred J. Goulding	
Our Fighting Navy	April 1937	Norman Walker	
O-Kay for Sound	April 1937	Marcel Varnel	
Take My Tip	May 1937	Herbert Mason	
King Solomon's Mines	June 1937	Robert Stevenson	
The Edge of the World	July 1937	Michael Powell	
Said O'Reilly to McNab	July 1937	William Beaudine	
School for Husbands	August 1937	Andrew Marton	
Command Performance	August 1937	Sinclair Hill	
Gangway	August 1937	Sonnie Hale	
Jericho	August 1937	Thornton Freeland	
Doctor Syn	August 1937	Roy William Neill	
Non-Stop New York	September 1937	Robert Stevenson	
Smash and Grab	September 1937	Tim Whelan	
Oh, Mr Porter!	October 1937	Marcel Varnel	
Young and Innocent	November 1937	Alfred Hitchcock	
The Sky's the Limit	1938	Jack Buchanan	
Sweet Devil	January 1938	René Guissart	
Lightning Conductor	1938	Maurice Elvey	
A Spot of Bother	1938	David MacDonald	
Second Best Bed	January 1938	Tom Walls	
Sailing Along	January 1938	Sonnie Hale	
Owd Bob	January 1938	Robert Stevenson	
Bank Holiday	January 1938	Carol Reed	
Pygmalion	March 1938	Anthony Asquith, Leslie Howard	
Kicking the Moon Around	March 1938	Walter Forde	
Break the News	April 1938	René Clair	
Strange Boarders	May 1938	Herbert Mason	
Convict 99	June 1938	Marcel Varnel	
Alf's Button Afloat	July 1938	Marcel Varnel	
Kate Plus Ten	August 1938	Reginald Denham	
Crackerjack	October 1938	Albert de Courville	
Hey! Hey! USA	October 1938	Marcel Varnel	
Old Bones of the River	December 1938	Marcel Varnel	
The Mikado	January 1939	Victor Schertzinger	
A Girl Must Live	April 1939	Carol Reed	
On the Night of the Fire	October 1939	Brian Desmond Hurst	
The Frozen Limits	November 1939	Marcel Varnel	
The Arsenal Stadium Mystery	November 1939	Thorold Dickinson	

== 1940s ==
Title	Release date	Director	Notes
Band Waggon	March 1940	Marcel Varnel	
The Spider	April 1940	Maurice Elvey	
For Freedom	May 1940	Maurice Elvey	
A Window in London	June 1940	Herbert Mason	
Charley's (Big-Hearted) Aunt	August 1940	Walter Forde	
Neutral Port	December 1940	Marcel Varnel	
Gasbags	February 1941	Walter Forde, Marcel Varnel	
Old Bill and Son	March 1941	Ian Dalrymple	
The Ghost Train	May 1941	Walter Forde	
The Man at the Gate	July 1941	Norman Walker	
Major Barbara	August 1941	Gabriel Pascal	
Jeannie	September 1941	Harold French	
Cottage to Let	September 1941	Anthony Asquith	
He Found a Star	September 1941	John Paddy Carstairs	
49th Parallel	October 1941	Michael Powell	
I Thank You	October 1941	Marcel Varnel	
Hi Gang!	December 1941	Marcel Varnel	
Back-Room Boy	April 1942	Herbert Mason	
Hard Steel	May 1942	Norman Walker	
The Day Will Dawn	June 1942	Harold French	
Uncensored	August 1942	Anthony Asquith	
The First of the Few	September 1942	Leslie Howard	
Secret Mission	October 1942	Harold French	
The Great Mr. Handel	November 1942	Norman Walker	
King Arthur Was a Gentleman	December 1942	Marcel Varnel	
The Silver Fleet	March 1943	Vernon Sewell	
It's That Man Again	March 1943	Walter Forde	
We Dive at Dawn	April 1943	Anthony Asquith	
The Gentle Sex	April 1943	Leslie Howard	
The Life and Death of Colonel Blimp	June 1943	Michael Powell	
Miss London Ltd.	June 1943	Val Guest	
The Man in Grey	August 1943	Leslie Arliss	
The Flemish Farm	September 1943	Jeffrey Dell	
Dear Octopus	September 1943	Harold French	
Millions Like Us	November 1943	Sidney Gilliat, Frank Launder	
They Met in the Dark	November 1943	Karel Lamac	
The Lamp Still Burns	November 1943	Maurice Elvey	
The Demi-Paradise	December 1943	Anthony Asquith	
On Approval	February 1944	Clive Brook	
Bees in Paradise	March 1944	Val Guest	
Tawny Pipit	April 1944	Bernard Miles	
Time Flies	May 1944	Walter Forde	
Fanny by Gaslight	May 1944	Anthony Asquith	
The Way Ahead	June 1944	Carol Reed	
This Happy Breed	June 1944	David Lean	
English Without Tears	July 1944	Harold French	
Give Us the Moon	July 1944	Val Guest	
A Canterbury Tale	August 1944	Michael Powell	
Mr. Emmanuel	October 1944	Harold French	
Henry V	November 1944	Laurence Olivier	
Love Story	November 1944	Leslie Arliss	
Don't Take It to Heart	November 1944	Jeffrey Dell	
Two Thousand Women	November 1944	Frank Launder	
Madonna of the Seven Moons	January 1945	Arthur Crabtree	
Waterloo Road	February 1945	Sidney Gilliat	
Blithe Spirit	April 1945	David Lean	
A Place of One's Own	May 1945	Bernard Knowles	
The Way to the Stars	June 1945	Anthony Asquith	
They Were Sisters	July 1945	Arthur Crabtree	
I'll Be Your Sweetheart	July 1945	Val Guest	
Dead of Night	September 1945	Alberto Cavalcanti, Charles Crichton; Robert Hamer, Basil Dearden	
Johnny Frenchman	October 1945	Charles Frend	
The Seventh Veil	October 1945	Compton Bennett	
I Know Where I'm Going!	November 1945	Michael Powell	
Brief Encounter	November 1945	David Lean	
The Wicked Lady	November 1945	Leslie Arliss	
The Rake's Progress	December 1945	Sidney Gilliat	
Caesar and Cleopatra	December 1945	Gabriel Pascal	
Pink String and Sealing Wax	December 1945	Robert Hamer	
They Knew Mr. Knight	March 1946	Norman Walker	
The Years Between	April 1946	Compton Bennett	
The Captive Heart	April 1946	Basil Dearden	
Bedelia	May 1946	Lance Comfort	
Caravan	June 1946	Arthur Crabtree	
Here Comes the Sun	June 1946	John Baxter	
Beware of Pity	July 1946	Maurice Elvey	
I See a Dark Stranger	July 1946	Frank Launder	
Theirs Is the Glory	August 1946	Brian Desmond Hurst	
Men of Two Worlds	September 1946	Thorold Dickinson	
The Magic Bow	September 1946	Bernard Knowles	
London Town	September 1946	Wesley Ruggles	
Tehran	October 1946	William Freshman, Giacomo Gentilomo	
The Overlanders	October 1946	Harry Watt	
A Matter of Life and Death	November 1946	Michael Powell	
School for Secrets	November 1946	Peter Ustinov	
Carnival	December 1946	Stanley Haynes	
Great Expectations	December 1946	David Lean	
Green for Danger	December 1946	Sidney Gilliat	
Hungry Hill	January 1947	Brian Desmond Hurst	
Odd Man Out	January 1947	Carol Reed	
Hue and Cry	February 1947	Charles Crichton	
The Root of All Evil	February 1947	Brock Williams	
Nicholas Nickleby	March 1947	Alberto Cavalcanti	
The Man Within	April 1947	Bernard Knowles	
Black Narcissus	May 1947	Michael Powell	
Dear Murderer	May 1947	Arthur Crabtree	
Take My Life	May 1947	Ronald Neame	
Frieda	June 1947	Basil Dearden	
The Loves of Joanna Godden	June 1947	Charles Frend	
The Upturned Glass	June 1947	Lawrence Huntington	
The Brothers	July 1947	David MacDonald	
So Well Remembered	July 1947	Edward Dmytryk	
Holiday Camp	August 1947	Ken Annakin	
Jassy	August 1947	Bernard Knowles	
The October Man	August 1947	Roy Ward Baker	
Fame Is the Spur	September 1947	Boulting Brothers	
Master of Bankdam	September 1947	Walter Forde	
Uncle Silas	October 1947	Charles Frank	
The Woman in the Hall	October 1947	Jack Lee	
The White Unicorn	October 1947	Bernard Knowles	
It Always Rains on Sunday	November 1947	Robert Hamer	
When the Bough Breaks	November 1947	Lawrence Huntington	
The End of the River	December 1947	Derek Twist	
The Mark of Cain	December 1947	Brian Desmond Hurst	
Vice Versa	January 1948	Peter Ustinov	
Easy Money	January 1948	Bernard Knowles	
Against the Wind	February 1948	Charles Crichton	
Blanche Fury	February 1948	Marc Allégret	
Corridor of Mirrors	March 1948	Terence Young	
Broken Journey	April 1948	Ken Annakin	
Good-Time Girl	April 1948	David MacDonald	
Miranda	April 1948	Ken Annakin	
One Night with You	April 1948	Terence Young	
The Calendar	May 1948	Arthur Crabtree	
Hamlet	May 1948	Laurence Olivier	
Daybreak	May 1948	Compton Bennett	
Snowbound	May 1948	David MacDonald	
My Sister and I	June 1948	Harold Huth	
A Song for Tomorrow	June 1948	Terence Fisher	
Penny and the Pownall Case	July 1948	Slim Hand	
My Brother's Keeper	August 1948	Alfred Roome	
London Belongs to Me	August 1948	Sidney Gilliat	
Mr. Perrin and Mr. Traill	August 1948	Lawrence Huntington	
The Blind Goddess	September 1948	Harold French	
Esther Waters	September 1948	Ian Dalrymple	
The Weaker Sex	September 1948	Roy Ward Baker	
Colonel Bogey	September 1948	Terence Fisher	
The Red Shoes	September 1948	Michael Powell	
Love in Waiting	October 1948	Douglas Pierce	
Woman Hater	October 1948	Terence Young	
Oliver Twist	October 1948	David Lean	
Quartet	October 1948	Various	
Saraband for Dead Lovers	October 1948	Basil Dearden	
Sleeping Car to Trieste	October 1948	John Paddy Carstairs	
Here Come the Huggetts	November 1948	Ken Annakin	
A Piece of Cake	November 1948	John Irwin	
Trouble in the Air	November 1948	Charles Saunders	
It's Hard to Be Good	November 1948	Jeffrey Dell	
Scott of the Antarctic	November 1948	Charles Frend	
Another Shore	December 1948	Charles Crichton	
Look Before You Love	December 1948	Harold Huth	
Portrait from Life	December 1948	Terence Fisher	
Third Time Lucky	January 1949	Gordon Parry	
Eureka Stockade	January 1949	Harry Watt	
Warning to Wantons	January 1949	Donald Wilson	
Once a Jolly Swagman	January 1949	Jack Lee	
The Passionate Friends	January 1949	David Lean	
Vote for Huggett	February 1949	Ken Annakin	
Badger's Green	February 1949	John Irwin	
Once Upon a Dream	February 1949	Ralph Thomas	
All Over the Town	March 1949	Derek Twist	
Cardboard Cavalier	March 1949	Walter Forde	
Floodtide	March 1949	Frederick Wilson	
The History of Mr. Polly	March 1949	Anthony Pelissier	
The Bad Lord Byron	April 1949	David MacDonald	
Passport to Pimlico	April 1949	Henry Cornelius	
It's Not Cricket	April 1949	Alfred Roome	
The Perfect Woman	May 1949	Bernard Knowles	
The Huggetts Abroad	May 1949	Ken Annakin	
Adam and Evelyne	May 1949	Harold French	
Fools Rush In	May 1949	John Paddy Carstairs	
A Boy, a Girl and a Bike	May 1949	Ralph Smart	
Kind Hearts and Coronets	June 1949	Robert Hamer	
Marry Me!	June 1949	Terence Fisher	
Stop Press Girl	June 1949	Michael Barry	
Whisky Galore!	June 1949	Alexander Mackendrick	
Don't Ever Leave Me	July 1949	Arthur Crabtree	
Poet's Pub	July 1949	Frederick Wilson	
Helter Skelter	July 1949	Ralph Thomas	
Train of Events	August 1949	Various	
The Lost People	August 1949	Muriel Box, Bernard Knowles	
Madness of the Heart	August 1949	Charles Bennett	
Trottie True	August 1949	Brian Desmond Hurst	
Obsession	August 1949	Edward Dmytryk	
Dear Mr. Prohack	September 1949	Thornton Freeland	
Diamond City	September 1949	David MacDonald	
The Chiltern Hundreds	September 1949	John Paddy Carstairs	
Christopher Columbus	October 1949	David MacDonald	
The Blue Lagoon	October 1949	Frank Launder	
The Rocking Horse Winner	November 1949	Anthony Pelissier	
The Romantic Age	November 1949	Edmond T. Gréville	
A Run for Your Money	November 1949	Charles Frend	
The Spider and the Fly	December 1949	Robert Hamer	
Boys in Brown	December 1949	Montgomery Tully	

== 1950s ==
Title	Release date	Director	Notes
The Blue Lamp	January 1950	Basil Dearden	
Golden Salamander	February 1950	Ronald Neame	
The Astonished Heart	February 1950	Terence Fisher	
Madeleine	February 1950	David Lean	
Morning Departure	February 1950	Roy Ward Baker	
They Were Not Divided	March 1950	Terence Young	
The Reluctant Widow	May 1950	Bernard Knowles	
Prelude to Fame	May 1950	Fergus McDonell	
So Long at the Fair	May 1950	Terence Fisher	
Tony Draws a Horse	June 1950	John Paddy Carstairs	
Waterfront	July 1950	Michael Anderson	
Bitter Springs	July 1950	Ralph Smart	
Trio	August 1950	Ken Annakin, Harold French	
The Woman in Question	October 1950	Anthony Asquith	
Cage of Gold	October 1950	Basil Dearden	
The Magnet	October 1950	Charles Frend	
The Clouded Yellow	November 1950	Ralph Thomas	
Highly Dangerous	December 1950	Roy Ward Baker	
Traveller's Joy	December 1950	Ralph Thomas	
The Dark Man	January 1951	Jeffrey Dell	
Blackmailed	January 1951	Marc Allégret	
Pool of London	February 1951	Basil Dearden	
The Adventurers	March 1951	David MacDonald	
The Browning Version	March 1951	Anthony Asquith	
Night Without Stars	April 1951	Anthony Pelissier	
White Corridors	June 1951	Pat Jackson	
The Lavender Hill Mob	June 1951	Charles Crichton	
Hotel Sahara	July 1951	Ken Annakin	
The Man in the White Suit	August 1951	Alexander Mackendrick	
Valley of Eagles	September 1951	Terence Young	
Appointment with Venus	October 1951	Ralph Thomas	
Where No Vultures Fly	November 1951	Harry Watt	
High Treason	November 1951	Roy Boulting	
Encore	November 1951	Pat Jackson, Anthony Pelissier; Harold French	
His Excellency	January 1952	Robert Hamer	
Secret People	February 1952	Thorold Dickinson	
The Card	February 1952	Ronald Neame	
I Believe in You	March 1952	Basil Dearden	
Hunted	March 1952	Charles Crichton	
Curtain Up	May 1952	Ralph Smart	
The Importance of Being Earnest	June 1952	Anthony Asquith	
Something Money Can't Buy	July 1952	Pat Jackson	
Mandy	July 1952	Alexander Mackendrick	
Penny Princess	August 1952	Val Guest	
Meet Me Tonight	September 1952	Anthony Pelissier	
The Planter's Wife	September 1952	Ken Annakin	
The Gentle Gunman	October 1952	Basil Dearden	
It Started in Paradise	October 1952	Compton Bennett	
Venetian Bird	October 1952	Ralph Thomas	
Made in Heaven	November 1952	John Paddy Carstairs	
The Long Memory	January 1953	Robert Hamer	
The Net	February 1953	Anthony Asquith	
Top of the Form	February 1953	John Paddy Carstairs	
Black Orchid	February 1953	Charles Saunders	
Street Corner	March 1953	Muriel Box	
Desperate Moment	March 1953	Compton Bennett	
The Cruel Sea	March 1953	Charles Frend	
The Titfield Thunderbolt	March 1953	Michael Truman	
Deadly Nightshade	March 1953	John Gilling	
Genevieve	April 1953	Henry Cornelius	
Turn the Key Softly	April 1953	Jack Lee	
A Queen Is Crowned	June 1953	Michael Waldman	Documentary of Coronation of Elizabeth II
Malta Story	June 1953	Brian Desmond Hurst	
The Square Ring	July 1953	Basil Dearden	
Wheel of Fate	July 1953	Francis Searle	
Always a Bride	August 1953	Ralph Smart	
The Final Test	August 1953	Anthony Asquith	
Personal Affair	October 1953	Anthony Pelissier	
A Day to Remember	November 1953	Ralph Thomas	
Meet Mr. Lucifer	November 1953	Anthony Pelissier	
Trouble in Store	December 1953	John Paddy Carstairs	
The Kidnappers	December 1953	Philip Leacock	
Small Town Story	December 1953	Montgomery Tully	
The Love Lottery	January 1954	Charles Crichton	
The Million Pound Note	January 1954	Ronald Neame	
You Know What Sailors Are	February 1954	Ken Annakin	
The Maggie	February 1954	Alexander Mackendrick	
Star of My Night	February 1954	Paul Dickson	
Fast and Loose	February 1954	Gordon Parry	
Doctor in the House	March 1954	Ralph Thomas	
West of Zanzibar	March 1954	Harry Watt	
Double Exposure	March 1954	John Gilling	
Forbidden Cargo	May 1954	Harold French	
The Rainbow Jacket	May 1954	Basil Dearden	
The Seekers	June 1954	Ken Annakin	
The Embezzler	July 1954	John Gilling	
Delayed Action	July 1954	John Harlow	
Up to His Neck	August 1954	John Paddy Carstairs	
The Beachcomber	August 1954	Muriel Box	
The Young Lovers	August 1954	Anthony Asquith	
Romeo and Juliet	September 1954	Renato Castellani	
The Purple Plain	September 1954	Robert Parrish	
Lease of Life	October 1954	Charles Frend	
The Divided Heart	November 1954	Charles Chrichton	
Mad About Men	November 1954	Ralph Thomas	
One Good Turn	January 1955	John Paddy Carstairs	
To Paris with Love	January 1955	Robert Hamer	
Simba	January 1955	Brian Desmond Hurst	
Out of the Clouds	February 1955	Basil Dearden	
One Jump Ahead	March 1955	Charles Saunders	
As Long as They're Happy	March 1955	J. Lee Thompson	
The Night My Number Came Up	March 1955	Leslie Norman	
Above Us the Waves	March 1955	Ralph Thomas	
The Ship That Died of Shame	April 1955	Basil Dearden	
Passage Home	April 1955	Roy Ward Baker	
The Hornet's Nest	May 1955	Charles Saunders	

== Rank Film Distributors ==
Title	Release date	Director	Notes
Doctor at Sea	July 1955	Ralph Thomas	
Value for Money	August 1955	Ken Annakin	
The Woman for Joe	August 1955	George More O'Ferrall	
One Way Out	September 1955	Francis Searle	
Touch and Go	October 1955	Michael Truman	
Man of the Moment	November 1955	John Paddy Carstairs	
Simon and Laura	November 1955	Muriel Box	
All for Mary	December 1955	Wendy Toye	
An Alligator Named Daisy	December 1955	J. Lee Thompson	
The Ladykillers	December 1955	Alexander Mackendrick	
Lost	January 1956	Guy Green	
Jumping for Joy	February 1956	John Paddy Carstairs	
On Such a Night	February 1956	Anthony Asquith	Short film about Glyndebourne Opera House
A Town Like Alice	March 1956	Jack Lee	
The Feminine Touch	March 1956	Pat Jackson	
The Black Tent	March 1956	Brian Desmond Hurst	
Who Done It?	March 1956	Basil Dearden	
Jacqueline	June 1956	Roy Ward Baker	
The Long Arm	June 1956	Charles Frend	
Behind the Headlines	July 1956	Charles Saunders	
Reach for the Sky	July 1956	Lewis Gilbert	
Eyewitness	August 1956	Muriel Box	
The Battle of the River Plate	October 1956	Michael Powell	
Find the Lady	October 1956	Charles Saunders	
House of Secrets	October 1956	Guy Green	
Tiger in the Smoke	November 1956	Roy Ward Baker	
Checkpoint	December 1956	Ralph Thomas	
The Hideout	December 1956	Peter Graham Scott	
The Spanish Gardener	December 1956	Philip Leacock	
Up in the World	December 1956	John Paddy Carstairs	
Ill Met by Moonlight	January 1957	Michael Powell	
Suspended Alibi	February 1957	Alfred Shaughnessy	
The Secret Place	February 1957	Clive Donner	
True as a Turtle	February 1957	Wendy Toye	
There's Always a Thursday	March 1957	Charles Saunders	
The Crooked Sky	April 1957	Henry Cass	
Doctor at Large	April 1957	Ralph Thomas	
High Tide at Noon	April 1957	Philip Leacock	
The Heart Within	July 1957	David Eady	
Miracle in Soho	August 1957	Julian Amyes	
Account Rendered	August 1957	Peter Graham Scott	
Across the Bridge	August 1957	Ken Annakin	
Hell Drivers	August 1957	Cy Endfield	
Campbell's Kingdom	September 1957	Ralph Thomas	
Seven Thunders	September 1957	Hugo Fregonese	
The Big Chance	September 1957	Peter Graham Scott	
Robbery Under Arms	October 1957	Jack Lee	
Strangers' Meeting	October 1957	Robert Day	
Just My Luck	November 1957	John Paddy Carstairs	
The One That Got Away	November 1957	Roy Ward Baker	
Dangerous Exile	December 1957	Brian Desmond Hurst	
Windom's Way	December 1957	Ronald Neame	
The Gypsy and the Gentleman	January 1958	Joseph Losey	
The Naked Truth	January 1958	Mario Zampi	
Violent Playground	January 1958	Basil Dearden	
Carve Her Name with Pride	February 1958	Lewis Gilbert	
The Diplomatic Corpse	February 1958	Montgomery Tully	
A Tale of Two Cities	February 1958	Ralph Thomas	
Innocent Sinners	March 1958	Philip Leacock	
Rooney	March 1958	George Pollock	
Heart of a Child	April 1958	Clive Donner	
Dracula	May 1958	Terence Fisher	
The Big Money	June 1958	John Paddy Carstairs	
The Wind Cannot Read	June 1958	Ralph Thomas	
A Night to Remember	July 1958	Roy Ward Baker	
Nor the Moon by Night	August 1958	Ken Annakin	
Sea Fury	August 1958	Cy Endfield	
Passionate Summer	September 1958	Rudolph Cartier	
The Bank Raiders	October 1958	Maxwell Munden	
Dublin Nightmare	October 1958	John Pomeroy	
Rockets Galore	October 1958	Michael Relph	
Floods of Fear	November 1958	Charles Crichton	
Sea of Sand	November 1958	Guy Green	
Bachelor of Hearts	December 1958	Wolf Rilla	
The Square Peg	December 1958	John Paddy Carstairs	
The Captain's Table	January 1959	Jack Lee	
The Man Who Liked Funerals	January 1959	David Eady	
Hidden Homicide	January 1959	Tony Young	
Operation Amsterdam	January 1959	Michael McCarthy	
Too Many Crooks	March 1959	Mario Zampi	
The 39 Steps	March 1959	Ralph Thomas	
Whirlpool	March 1959	Lewis Allen	
Tiger Bay	March 1959	J. Lee Thompson	
Sapphire	April 1959	Basil Dearden	
Ferry to Hong Kong	July 1959	Lewis Gilbert	
The Heart of a Man	July 1959	Herbert Wilcox	
Blind Date	August 1959	Joseph Losey	
Upstairs and Downstairs	August 1959	Ralph Thomas	
The Mummy	September 1959	Terence Fisher	
The Night We Dropped a Clanger	October 1959	Darcy Conyers	
SOS Pacific	October 1959	Guy Green	
North West Frontier	October 1959	J. Lee Thompson	
Strictly Confidential	November 1959	Charles Saunders	
Desert Mice	December 1959	Michael Relph	
Devil's Bait	December 1959	Peter Graham Scott	
Follow a Star	December 1959	Robert Asher	
Witness in the Dark	December 1959	Wolf Rilla	
The Shakedown	January 1960	John Lemont	
Conspiracy of Hearts	February 1960	Ralph Thomas	
Too Young to Love	March 1960	Muriel Box	
Your Money or Your Wife	March 1960	Anthony Simmons	
The League of Gentlemen	April 1960	Basil Dearden	
And Women Shall Weep	April 1960	John Lemont	
Operation Cupid	April 1960	Charles Saunders	
The Challenge	May 1960	John Gilling	
Never Let Go	June 1960	John Guillermin	
The Savage Innocents	June 1960	Nicholas Ray	
The Brides of Dracula	July 1960	Terence Fisher	
Doctor in Love	July 1960	Ralph Thomas	
Make Mine Mink	July 1960	Robert Asher	
Snowball	August 1960	Pat Jackson	
Piccadilly Third Stop	September 1960	Wolf Rilla	
October Moth	September 1960	John Kruse	
Man in the Moon	October 1960	Basil Dearden	
Faces in the Dark	November 1960	David Eady	
The Bulldog Breed	December 1960	Robert Asher	
The Singer Not the Song	January 1961	Roy Ward Baker	
No Love for Johnnie	February 1961	Ralph Thomas	
Echo of Barbara	March 1961	Sidney Hayers	
The Grass Is Greener	March 1961	Stanley Donen	
Very Important Person	April 1961	Ken Annakin	
The Curse of the Werewolf	May 1961	Terence Fisher	
The Shadow of the Cat	May 1961	John Gilling	
Flame in the Streets	June 1961	Roy Ward Baker	
The Long Shadow	July 1961	Peter Maxwell	
Whistle Down the Wind	July 1961	Bryan Forbes	
Victim	August 1961	Basil Dearden	
Information Received	August 1961	Robert Lynn	
No, My Darling Daughter	August 1961	Ralph Thomas	
Over the Odds	November 1961	Michael Forlong	
In the Doghouse	December 1961	Darcy Conyers	
Hair of the Dog	January 1962	Terry Bishop	
All Night Long	February 1962	Basil Dearden	
The Golden Rabbit	February 1962	David MacDonald	
A Pair of Briefs	March 1962	Ralph Thomas	
Waltz of the Toreadors	April 1962	John Guillermin	
The Traitors	May 1962	Robert Tronson	
Captain Clegg	June 1962	Peter Graham Scott	
The Phantom of the Opera	June 1962	Terence Fisher	
Tiara Tahiti	July 1962	Ted Kotcheff	
Band of Thieves	August 1962	Peter Bezencenet	
Life for Ruth	August 1962	Basil Dearden	
Billy Budd	September 1962	Peter Ustinov	
The Primitives	October 1962	Alfred Travers	
The Wild and the Willing	October 1962	Ralph Thomas	
The Fur Collar	December 1962	Lawrence Huntington	
The Fast Lady	December 1962	Ken Annakin	
On the Beat	December 1962	Robert Asher	
This Sporting Life	February 1963	Lindsay Anderson	
Stranglehold	February 1963	Lawrence Huntington	
Call Me Bwana	April 1963	Gordon Douglas	
The Day of the Triffids	April 1963	Steve Sekely	
The Switch	May 1963	Peter Maxwell	
Lancelot and Guinevere	June 1963	Cornel Wilde	
Doctor in Distress	July 1963	Ralph Thomas	
80,000 Suspects	August 1963	Val Guest	
Bomb in the High Street	September 1963	Terry Bishop	
Bitter Harvest	October 1963	Peter Graham Scott	
The Informers	November 1963	Ken Annakin	
Farewell Performance	November 1963	Robert Tronson	
Live It Up!	November 1963	Lance Comfort	
The Eyes of Annie Jones	November 1963	Reginald LeBorg	
A Stitch in Time	December 1963	Robert Asher	
Kiss of the Vampire	January 1964	Don Sharp	
Paranoiac	January 1964	Freddie Francis	
Father Came Too!	February 1964	Peter Graham Scott	
Hot Enough for June	March 1964	Ralph Thomas	
Strictly for the Birds	March 1964	Vernon Sewell	
Nightmare	April 1964	Freddie Francis	
The Chalk Garden	April 1964	Ronald Neame	
The Evil of Frankenstein	May 1964	Freddie Francis	
The Beauty Jungle	June 1964	Val Guest	
Seance on a Wet Afternoon	June 1964	Bryan Forbes	
The High Bright Sun	March 1965	Ralph Thomas	
The Ipcress File	March 1965	Sidney J. Furie	
The Truth About Spring	June 1965	Richard Thorpe	
The Secret of Blood Island	June 1965	Quentin Lawrence	
Be My Guest	April 1965	Lance Comfort	
The Intelligence Men	April 1965	Robert Asher	
Dateline Diamonds	September 1965	Jeremy Summers	
The Early Bird	November 1965	Robert Asher	
The Heroes of Telemark	November 1965	Anthony Mann	
Sky West and Crooked	January 1966	John Mills	
Doctor in Clover	March 1966	Ralph Thomas	
That Riviera Touch	March 1966	Cliff Owen	
I Was Happy Here	July 1966	Desmond Davis	
The Sandwich Man	July 1966	Robert Hartford-Davis	
Fahrenheit 451	September 1966	François Truffaut	
The Trap	September 1966	Sidney Hayers	
They're a Weird Mob	October 1966	Michael Powell	
Press for Time	December 1966	Robert Asher	
A Countess from Hong Kong	January 1967	Charlie Chaplin	
The Quiller Memorandum	January 1967	Michael Anderson	
Deadlier Than the Male	February 1967	Ralph Thomas	
Privilege	February 1967	Peter Watkins	
Don't Lose Your Head	March 1967	Gerald Thomas	
Maroc 7	March 1967	Gerry O'Hara	
The Trygon Factor	May 1967	Cyril Frankel	
Stranger in the House	May 1967	Pierre Rouve	
The Jokers	June 1967	Michael Winner	
The Long Duel	July 1967	Ken Annakin	
The Magnificent Two	July 1967	Cliff Owen	
Pretty Polly	September 1967	Guy Green	
Two Weeks in September	October 1967	Serge Bourguignon	Co-production with France
Carry On Doctor	December 1967	Gerald Thomas	
The Plank	December 1967	Eric Sykes	Short film
Follow That Camel	December 1967	Gerald Thomas	
I'll Never Forget What's'isname	December 1967	Michael Winner	
Hell Is Empty	December 1967	Bernard Knowles	
Oedipus the King	June 1968	Philip Saville	
Don't Look Now... We're Being Shot At!	May 1968	Gérard Oury	Co-production with France
Work Is a Four-Letter Word	June 1968	Peter Hall	
Nobody Runs Forever	August 1968	Ralph Thomas	
Charlie Bubbles	September 1968	Albert Finney	
Boom!	October 1968	Joseph Losey	
Carry On Up the Khyber	November 1968	Gerald Thomas	
Subterfuge	December 1968	Peter Graham Scott	
Some Girls Do	January 1969	Ralph Thomas	
Isadora	March 1969	Karel Reisz	
Ring of Bright Water	April 1969	Jack Couffer	
Carry on Camping	May 1969	Gerald Thomas	
Secret Ceremony	June 1969	Joseph Losey	
Three Into Two Won't Go	July 1969	Peter Hall	
Doppelgänger	October 1969	Robert Parrish	
The Royal Hunt of the Sun	October 1969	Irving Lerner	
Emma Hamilton	November 1969	Christian-Jaque	
In Search of Gregory	November 1969	Peter Wood	
Carry on Again Doctor	December 1969	Gerald Thomas	
Twinky	January 1970	Richard Donner	
Carry on Up the Jungle	March 1970	Gerald Thomas	
Doctor in Trouble	June 1970	Ralph Thomas	
The World at Their Feet	June 1970	Alberto Isaac	Documentary about the 1970 World Cup
Toomorrow	August 1970	Val Guest	
Carry on Loving	November 1970	Gerald Thomas	
Countess Dracula	January 1971	Peter Sasdy	
Assault	February 1971	Sidney Hayers	
Carry On Henry	February 1971	Gerald Thomas	
When Eight Bells Toll	March 1971	Étienne Périer	
The Firechasers	June 1971	Sidney Hayers	
Revenge	August 1971	Sidney Hayers	
Quest for Love	September 1971	Ralph Thomas	
Please Sir!	September 1971	Mark Stuart	
Catch Me a Spy	September 1971	Dick Clement	
Hands of the Ripper	October 1971	Peter Sasdy	
Twins of Evil	October 1971	John Hough	
Carry on at Your Convenience	December 1971	Gerald Thomas	
Under Milk Wood	January 1972	Andrew Sinclair	
Antony and Cleopatra	March 1972	Charlton Heston	
Vampire Circus	April 1972	Robert Young	
Carry On Matron	May 1972	Gerald Thomas	
All Coppers Are...	June 1972	Sidney Hayers	
Rentadick	June 1972	Jim Clark	
Bless This House	September 1972	Gerald Thomas	
Alice's Adventures in Wonderland	December 1972	William Sterling	
Carry on Abroad	December 1972	Gerald Thomas	
Death Line	December 1972	Gary Sherman	
Go for a Take	December 1972	Harry Booth	
That's Your Funeral	December 1972	John Robins	
Nothing but the Night	January 1973	Peter Sasdy	
Don't Just Lie There, Say Something!	April 1973	Bob Kellett	
Father, Dear Father	May 1973	William G. Stewart	
The Belstone Fox	July 1973	James Hill	
Carry on Girls	November 1973	Gerald Thomas	
Soft Beds, Hard Battles	January 1974	Roy Boulting	
The Three Musketeers	March 1974	Richard Lester	
Zardoz	March 1974	John Boorman	
Carry on Dick	July 1974	Gerald Thomas	
Caravan to Vaccarès	August 1974	Geoffrey Reeve	
The Four Musketeers	March 1975	Richard Lester	
Deadly Strangers	April 1975	Sidney Hayers	
Legend of the Werewolf	April 1975	Freddie Francis	
What Changed Charley Farthing?	April 1975	Sidney Hayers	
Paper Tiger	May 1975	Ken Annakin	
The Romantic Englishwoman	May 1975	Joseph Losey	
Three for All	May 1975	Martin Campbell	
I Don't Want to Be Born	June 1975	Peter Sasdy	
The Ghoul	June 1975	Freddie Francis	
That Lucky Touch	August 1975	Christopher Miles	
Carry on Behind	December 1975	Gerald Thomas	
Russian Roulette	May 1976	Lou Lombardo	
The Swordsman	June 1976	Lindsay Shonteff	
Bugsy Malone	July 1976	Alan Parker	
Carry On England	October 1976	Gerald Thomas	
Age of Innocence	April 1977	Alan Bridges	
Voyage of the Damned	November 1977	Stuart Rosenberg	
That's Carry On!	November 1977	Gerald Thomas	Compilation
Tomorrow Never Comes	March 1978	Peter Collinson	
The Uncanny	April 1978	Denis Héroux	
The Shout	June 1978	Jerzy Skolimowski	
The Wild Geese	July 1978	Andrew V. McLaglen	
Carry On Emmannuelle	November 1978	Gerald Thomas	
Power Play	November 1978	Martyn Burke	
The Thirty Nine Steps	November 1978	Don Sharp	
Wombling Free	December 1978	Lionel Jeffries	
Tarka the Otter	January 1979	David Cobham	
The Riddle of the Sands	March 1979	Tony Maylam	
The Lady Vanishes	May 1979	Anthony Page	
Eagle's Wing	November 1979	Anthony Harvey	
The Human Factor	December 1979	Otto Preminger	
Bad Timing	April 1980	Nicolas Roeg	
Silver Dream Racer	April 1980	David Wickes	
The Sea Wolves	July 1980	Andrew V. McLaglen	
Nutcracker	December 1982	Anwar Kawadri	
Educating Rita	June 1983	Lewis Gilbert	
The Honorary Consul	December 1983	John Mackenzie	
The Chain	May 1984	Jack Gold	
Secret Places	May 1984	Zelda Barron	
Water	January 1985	Dick Clement	
Not Quite Paradise	March 1985	Lewis Gilbert	
Turtle Diary	November 1985	John Irvin	
Defence of the Realm	November 1985	David Drury	
Half Moon Street	August 1986	Bob Swaim	
Foreign Body	October 1986	Ronald Neame	
The Whistle Blower	December 1986	Simon Langton	
The Fourth Protocol	August 1987	John Mackenzie	
Stealing Heaven	May 1988	Clive Donner	
Return from the River Kwai	April 1989	Andrew V. McLaglen	
Dealers	September 1989	Colin Bucksey	
Welcome Home	September 1989	Franklin Schaffner	
Under Suspicion	September 1991	Simon Moore	

== Bibliography ==
- Macnab, Geoffrey. J. Arthur Rank and the British Film Industry. Routledge, 1994.
- Wood, Linda. British Films, 1927–1939. British Film Institute, 1986.

== See also ==
- List of Gainsborough Pictures films
- List of Ealing Studios films
- List of Stoll Pictures films
- List of British Lion films
- List of British National films
- List of British and Dominions films
- List of Two Cities Films
- List of Paramount British films
