= List of Ealing Studios films =

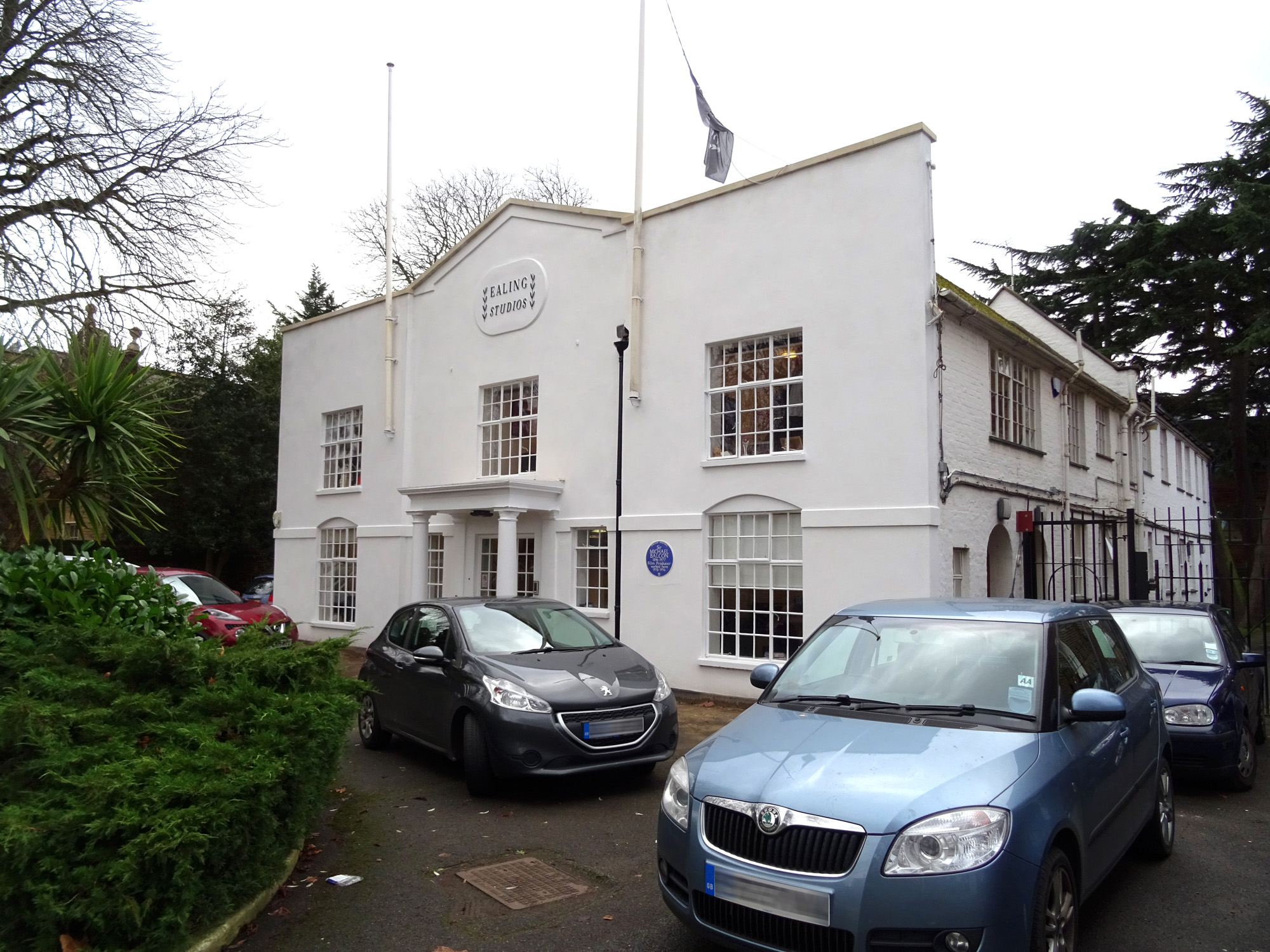
Ealing Film Studios in London

This is a list of films made by the British production company Ealing Studios and its predecessor Associated Talking Pictures. Prior to 1932 and after 1956, the company's films were made at studios other than Ealing. This list does not include films made at Ealing Studios by other companies.

== 1930s ==
Title	Release date	Director
Escape!	September 1930	Basil Dean
Birds of Prey	November 1930	Basil Dean
Sally in Our Alley	July 1931	Maurice Elvey
A Honeymoon Adventure	September 1931	Maurice Elvey
The Water Gipsies	March 1932	Maurice Elvey
Nine till Six	March 1932	Basil Dean
The Sign of Four	May 1932	Rowland V. Lee/Graham Cutts
The Impassive Footman	June 1932	Basil Dean
Love on the Spot	July 1932	Graham Cutts
Looking on the Bright Side	September 1932	Basil Dean/Graham Cutts
Three Men in a Boat	May 1933	Graham Cutts
Loyalties	May 1933	Basil Dean
Autumn Crocus	February 1934	Basil Dean
Love, Life and Laughter	March 1934	Maurice Elvey
Java Head	August 1934	J. Walter Ruben
Sing As We Go	September 1934	Basil Dean
Lorna Doone	January 1935	Basil Dean
Look Up and Laugh	June 1935	Basil Dean
Midshipman Easy	October 1935	Carol Reed
No Limit	November 1935	Monty Banks
Whom the Gods Love	February 1936	Basil Dean
Queen of Hearts	February 1936	Monty Banks
Laburnum Grove	May 1936	Carol Reed
Lonely Road	September 1936	James Flood
Keep Your Seats, Please	September 1936	Monty Banks
Feather Your Nest	March 1937	William Beaudine
The Show Goes On	April 1937	Basil Dean
Keep Fit	August 1937	Anthony Kimmins
I See Ice	February 1938	Anthony Kimmins
Penny Paradise	October 1938	Carol Reed
It's in the Air	November 1938	Anthony Kimmins
The Gaunt Stranger	November 1938	Walter Forde
The Ware Case	December 1938	Robert Stevenson
Trouble Brewing	March 1939	Anthony Kimmins
Let's Be Famous	March 1939	Walter Forde
The Four Just Men	June 1939	Walter Forde
There Ain't No Justice	June 1939	Pen Tennyson
Young Man's Fancy	August 1939	Robert Stevenson
Cheer Boys Cheer	August 1939	Walter Forde
Come On George!	November 1939	Anthony Kimmins

== 1940s ==
Title	Release date	Director
Return to Yesterday	January 1940	Robert Stevenson
The Proud Valley	March 1940	Pen Tennyson
Let George Do It!	July 1940	Marcel Varnel
Convoy	July 1940	Pen Tennyson
Saloon Bar	October 1940	Walter Forde
Sailors Three	December 1940	Walter Forde
Spare a Copper	December 1940	John Paddy Carstairs
The Ghost of St. Michael's	April 1941	Marcel Varnel
Turned Out Nice Again	August 1941	Marcel Varnel
Ships with Wings	November 1941	Sergei Nolbandov
The Black Sheep of Whitehall	January 1942	Basil Dearden/Will Hay
The Big Blockade	January 1942	Charles Frend
The Foreman Went to France	April 1942	Charles Frend
The Next of Kin	May 1942	Thorold Dickinson
The Goose Steps Out	August 1942	Basil Dearden/Will Hay
Nine Men	January 1943	Harry Watt
The Bells Go Down	April 1943	Basil Dearden
My Learned Friend	June 1943	Basil Dearden/Will Hay
Undercover	July 1943	Sergei Nolbandov
Went the Day Well?	October 1943	Alberto Cavalcanti
San Demetrio London	December 1943	Charles Frend
The Halfway House	April 1944	Basil Dearden
For Those in Peril	June 1944	Charles Crichton
They Came to a City	August 1944	Basil Dearden
Champagne Charlie	August 1944	Alberto Cavalcanti
Fiddlers Three	October 1944	Harry Watt
Johnny Frenchman	July 1945	Charles Frend
Dead of Night	September 1945	Alberto Cavalcanti (as Cavalcanti); Charles Crichton; Basil Dearden; Robert Hamer
Painted Boats	October 1945	Charles Crichton
Pink String and Sealing Wax	November 1945	Robert Hamer
The Captive Heart	March 1946	Basil Dearden
The Overlanders	October 1946	Harry Watt
Hue and Cry	February 1947	Charles Crichton
The Life and Adventures of Nicholas Nickleby	March 1947	Alberto Cavalcanti
Frieda	June 1947	Basil Dearden
The Loves of Joanna Godden	July 1947	Charles Frend
It Always Rains on Sunday	November 1947	Robert Hamer
Against the Wind	March 1948	Charles Crichton
Saraband for Dead Lovers	September 1948	Basil Dearden
Another Shore	November 1948	Charles Crichton
Scott of the Antarctic	December 1948	Charles Frend
Eureka Stockade	January 1949	Harry Watt
Passport to Pimlico	April 1949	Henry Cornelius
Whisky Galore!	June 1949	Alexander MacKendrick
Kind Hearts and Coronets	June 1949	Robert Hamer
Train of Events	August 1949	Sidney Cole/Charles Crichton/Basil Dearden
A Run for Your Money	November 1949	Charles Frend

== 1950s ==
Release date	Title	Director	Budget	Gross	Notes
20 January 1950	The Blue Lamp	Basil Dearden	£142,304	£246,000	Inspiration for Dixon of Dock Green
8 June 1950	Dance Hall	Charles Crichton	£167,749	£89,000	
24 June 1950	Bitter Springs	Ralph Smart	£100,000	£114,000	Filmed in Australia
October 1950	Cage of Gold	Basil Dearden	£192,000		
October 1950	The Magnet	Charles Frend		£75,000	children's film
February 1951	Pool of London	Basil Dearden	£130,000		
June 1951	The Lavender Hill Mob	Charles Crichton			comedy
August 1951	The Man in the White Suit	Alexander Mackendrick		$500,000(US)	comedy
December 1951	Where No Vultures Fly	Harry Watt		£152,000	Shot in Kenya
10 January 1952	His Excellency	Robert Hamer		£109,000	
8 February 1952	Secret People	Thorold Dickinson		£60,000	
March 1952	I Believe in You	Basil Dearden		£89,000	
29 July 1952	Mandy	Alexander Mackendrick			
October 1952	The Gentle Gunman	Basil Dearden			IRA subject mater
March 1953	The Titfield Thunderbolt	Charles Crichton			comedy
March 1953	The Cruel Sea	Charles Frend		$840,000 (UK) $600,000 (US)	World War Two film
13 July 1953	The Square Ring	Basil Dearden			boxing drama
26 November 1953	Meet Mr Lucifer	Anthony Pelissier			
28 January 1954	The Love Lottery	Charles Crichton			comedy
25 February 1954	The Maggie	Alexander Mackendrick			comedy
24 March 1954	West of Zanzibar	Harry Watt			Filmed in Africa
27 May 1954	The Rainbow Jacket	Basil Dearden			
19 October 1954	Lease of Life	Charles Frend			
9 November 1954	The Divided Heart	Charles Crichton			war film
14 February 1955	Out of the Clouds	Basil Dearden			
22 March 1955	The Night My Number Came Up	Leslie Norman			
19 April 1955	The Ship That Died of Shame	Basil Dearden			
September 1955	Touch and Go	Michael Truman			
December 1955	The Ladykillers	Alexander Mackendrick			comedy
18 March 1956	Who Done It?	Basil Dearden			comedy
27 March 1956	The Feminine Touch	Pat Jackson			drama
June 1956	The Long Arm	Charles Frend			Last film made for Rank

=== Ealing-MGM ===
Title	Release date	Director	Budget	Gross	Notes
January 1957	The Man in the Sky	Charles Crichton	$486,000	$500,000	
11 July 1957	The Shiralee	Leslie Norman	$597,000	$920,000	Shot in Australia
2 December 1957	Barnacle Bill	Charles Frend	$659,000	$950,000	
December 1957	Davy	Michael Relph	$458,000	$305,000	musical-drama
March 1958	Dunkirk	Leslie Norman	$1,025,000	$2,060,000	war film
December 1958	Nowhere to Go	Seth Holt	$468,000	$460,000	thriller

=== Ealing-Associated British ===
Title	Release date	Director	Budget	Gross	Notes
August 1959	The Siege of Pinchgut	Harry Watt	over £200,000		Shot in Australia

== See also ==
- List of Stoll Pictures films
- List of Gainsborough Pictures films
- List of British and Dominions films
- List of British Lion films
- List of British National films
- List of Two Cities Films
- List of General Film Distributors films
- List of Paramount British films

== Bibliography ==
- Perry, George. Forever Ealing. Pavilion Books, 1994.
