= Gordon Hopkirk =

British actor (1884–1966)

- Born: Hubert Gordon Hopkirk; 20 April 1884; Jena, Germany
- Died: 1966 (aged 72); Thailand
- Occupation: British actor

Hubert Gordon Hopkirk (20 April 1884 – 1966) was a British actor of the silent era. He was born in Jena, Germany to British parents and began his film career in the late 1910s. After a series of films in Britain, he went to the United States to appear in Hollywood films before returning to Britain. Hopkirk never married. Later in life he converted to Buddhism and resided in Bangkok, Thailand. He died in a car accident at the age of 72.

== Selected filmography ==
- Sybil (1921)
- The Skipper's Wooing (1922)
- The Wandering Jew (1923)
- Love, Life and Laughter (1923)
- White Slippers (1924)
- The Notorious Mrs. Carrick (1924)
- The Island of Despair (1926)
- A Woman Redeemed (1927)
