= Frederick Peisley =

British actor (1904–1975)

Frederick Peisley

Frederick Walter James Peisley (6 December 1904 – 22 March 1975) was a British stage, film and television actor and theatre director whose career spanned five decades. He is known for The Secret of the Loch (1934), Gentlemen's Agreement (1935) and Murder at the Cabaret (1936). His later career was mostly in television.

Fred Peisley was born in Finchley in London in 1904, the son of Annie Emily and Walter John Peisley, a baker.

== Theatre ==
Early stage appearances included The Mental Athletes at the Lyric Theatre in Hammersmith (1922); Jim Hawkins in matinee performances of Treasure Island at the Strand Theatre (1923), and A Midsummer Night's Dream at the Theatre Royal, Drury Lane (1924). In 1925 he appeared in "a dull and stodgy production" of Dryden's The Assignation at the Aldwych Theatre, in the same year touring in the musical romance Derby Day. In 1927 he appeared alongside John Gielgud in The Great God Brown at the Strand Theatre, while in 1928 he played Taya in Contraband at the Q Theatre. In 1936 he appeared in Ivor Novello's Careless Rapture at the Theatre Royal, Drury Lane, and in 1938 he acted in Heaven and Charing Cross at the St Martin's Theatre and in The Ascent of F6 at The Old Vic.

In 1940 he directed a production of The Dominant Sex for the Dundee Repertory Theatre Company, featuring an early performance by Patrick Cargill. In 1947 Peisley joined the touring company of Donald Wolfit with whom he appeared as Puck in A Midsummer Night's Dream on Broadway and in Canada. Billboard said of Peisley's performance, "Frederick Peisley as Puck is adequate only, much of the wit of Shakespeare's lines being lost in the excessive bounce and speed Peisley puts into the chore."

The year 1949 saw Peisley portraying "a remarkably lifelike Swinburne" at the Royal Opera House in a controversial production of Salome, directed by Peter Brook and with costumes and sets designed by Salvador Dalí. In 1951 Peisley directed productions of High Temperature and Arsenic and Old Lace at the Chesterfield Theatre.

In 1953 he appeared as Cribb in The Drunkard at the Irving Theatre in London; at the Salisbury Playhouse he played Man Friday in the pantomime Robinson Crusoe (1955); John of Gaunt in Richard II (1955), with Gerald Flood in the title role; Mr Charles Dumby in Lady Windermere's Fan (1956); in Book of the Month (1956) with Leonard Rossiter, and General Mackenzie in Agatha Christie's Ten Little Niggers (1957). He appeared in Flowering Cherry by Robert Bolt at the Bristol Hippodrome (1958).

== Film roles ==
Film appearances included Peter Farrar in Frail Women (1932), Kenneth Bailey in The Scotland Yard Mystery (1934), Jimmy Andrews in The Secret of the Loch (1934), Jackson in Freedom of the Seas (1934), Guy Carfax in Gentlemen's Agreement (1935), Jimmie in Murder at the Cabaret (1936), Fred Coggins in Lonely Road (1936), Michael Elwood in Full Speed Ahead (1936), 2nd Soldier in The Gentle Sex (1943), Lewis in The Angry Silence (1960), Mossie in The Marked One (1963), Cottrell in Hide and Seek (1964) and Tramp in Subterfuge (1968).

== Television appearances ==
Television roles included John Pepys in The Diary of Samuel Pepys (1958), Tell It to the Marines (1959), Edward Cathcart in Emergency – Ward 10 (1960), Albert Fisher in Harpers West One (1961), Herbert Keene in Our House (1960–1962), Arthur Berry in Comedy Playhouse (1963), Richard Marsham in The Plane Makers (1964), Major Harris/Ferapona/Jack Tubbs in ITV Play of the Week (1959–64), Brailsford in Love Story (1964), Henry Farthing in Dixon of Dock Green (1964), Mr. Clayton in Thursday Theatre (1965), Town Clerk in The Newcomers (1965), Dr. Winter in Danger Man (1965), Ryan/Fenton/Potty Smith/Tabby Marlowe/Alf Water in No Hiding Place (1962–65), Tiny Bray in Gideon's Way (1966), Mr. Loder in All Gas and Gaiters (1969), Grunner in The Avengers (1969), Johnson in Softly, Softly (1969), Earl of Shaftesbury in The First Churchills (1969), Beckett/Fred Copley/Mr. Stansfield in Z-Cars (1962–70).

Other television appearances included Prof. Ekdorf in Ace of Wands (1970), The Duke in Here Come the Double Deckers! (1970), Clerk of the Council in Menace (1970), Rupert in Paul Temple (1971), Professor Dawson in Freewheelers (1971), Capitani in Casanova (1971), Millard in Spyder's Web (1972), Petitbois in Clochemerle (1972), Mr. Thomas in Doctor in Charge (1972), Jimmy in Villains (1972), Cyril in Emmerdale Farm (1972), Mr. Chumley in The Fenn Street Gang (1973), Doctor in On the Buses (1973), Doctor in The Lotus Eaters (1973), Mr. Willis in The Onedin Line (1973), Hotel Porter/Charlie in Play for Today (1973), Paolo Morleiter in The Protectors (1973), Mr. Williams in Doctor at Sea (1974), and Lord Towers in Sykes (1974).

Frederick Peisley died at Warminster in Wiltshire in March 1975 aged 70.
