= Derek Gorst =

British actor (1903–1981)

Derek Gorst (1903–1981) was a British actor.

== Selected filmography ==
- Once a Thief (1935)
- Lucky Days (1935)
- Lucky Jade (1937)
- The Fatal Hour (1937)
- The Singing Cop (1938)
- The Gables Mystery (1938)
- Incident in Shanghai (1938)
- His Lordship Regrets (1938)
- The Mind of Mr. Reeder (1939)
- Read All About It (1945)
- Beware of Pity (1946)
