= List of Gainsborough Pictures films =

The following films were made by the British production company Gainsborough Pictures and its parent company Gaumont British between 1924 and 1950. The Gainsborough brand was first used in 1924, although several films had previously been made by the company's founders under a different name. Gaumont British, which took control of Gainsborough in the late 1920s, had also made films prior to 1924. After the merger, the companies released a single slate of films each year.

Following a financial crisis at the company in 1936, Gaumont British ceased production and concentrated on distribution. Despite this, films continued to be released under the Gainsborough banner. In its later years the company was part of the Rank Organisation; it was shut down by the Rank management in 1950 as part of an economy drive.

During the 1920s and 1930s the company took part in several co-productions with Continental companies, notably the German firm UFA. Other films were made by Gainsborough under contract for 20th Century-Fox. Also included are films made by Sydney Box's Triton Films.

== 1920s ==
Title	Release date	Director
Claude Duval	April 1924	George A. Cooper
The Prude's Fall	May 1924	Graham Cutts
The Passionate Adventure	July 1924	Graham Cutts
The Eleventh Commandment	July 1924	George A. Cooper
The Happy Ending	January 1925	George A. Cooper
The Blackguard	March 1925	Graham Cutts
The Rat	August 1925	Graham Cutts
Settled Out of Court	October 1925	George A. Cooper
Somebody's Darling	November 1925	George A. Cooper
The Sea Urchin	January 1926	Graham Cutts
The Pleasure Garden	May 1926	Alfred Hitchcock
London Love	July 1926	Manning Haynes
The Triumph of the Rat	September 1926	Graham Cutts
The Lodger	September 1926	Alfred Hitchcock
The Mountain Eagle	September 1926	Alfred Hitchcock
Mademoiselle from Armentieres	September 1926	Maurice Elvey
Hindle Wakes	February 1927	Maurice Elvey
Blighty	March 1927	Norman Walker
The Queen Was in the Parlour	April 1927	Graham Cutts
Roses of Picardy	April 1927	Maurice Elvey
Downhill	May 1927	Alfred Hitchcock
The Rolling Road	May 1927	Graham Cutts
The Glad Eye	June 1927	Maurice Elvey
Easy Virtue	July 1927	Alfred Hitchcock
Ghost Train	July 1927	Géza von Bolváry
The Vortex	September 1927	Adrian Brunel
A Sister to Assist 'Er	September 1927	George Dewhurst
The Flight Commander	September 1927	Maurice Elvey
A Woman in Pawn	October 1927	Edwin Greenwood
The Arcadians	October 1927	Victor Saville
One of the Best	November 1927	Hayes Hunter
Quinneys	December 1927	Maurice Elvey
Sailors Don't Care	January 1928	William Kellino
The Constant Nymph	February 1928	Adrian Brunel
The Physician	May 1928	George Jacoby
Mademoiselle Parley Voo	June 1928	Maurice Elvey
What Money Can Buy	July 1928	Edwin Greenwood
A South Sea Bubble	July 1928	Hayes Hunter
Palais de danse	July 1928	Maurice Elvey
Smashing Through	October 1928	William Kellino
The Gallant Hussar	October 1928	Géza von Bolváry
The First Born	October 1928	Miles Mander
You Know What Sailors Are	November 1928	Maurice Elvey
The Wrecker	December 1928	Géza von Bolváry
A Light Woman	December 1928	Adrian Brunel
The Lady of the Lake	December 1928	James A. Fitzpatrick
Number Seventeen	December 1928	Géza von Bolváry
Balaclava	December 1928	Maurice Elvey, Milton Rosmer
The Return of the Rat	May 1929	Graham Cutts
The Crooked Billet	May 1929	Adrian Brunel
City of Play	July 1929	Denison Clift
Taxi for Two	July 1929	Denison Clift, Alexander Esway
High Treason	August 1929	Maurice Elvey
The Devil's Maze	August 1929	Gareth Gundrey
Woman to Woman	November 1929	Victor Saville

== 1930s ==
Title	Release date	Director
Just for a Song	March 1930	Gareth Gundrey
Alf's Button	March 1930	William Kellino
The Night Porter	March 1930	Sewell Collins
Journey's End	April 1930	James Whale
Greek Street	May 1930	Sinclair Hill
Symphony in Two Flats	July 1930	Gareth Gundrey
The Great Game	September 1930	Jack Raymond
A Warm Corner	September 1930	Victor Saville
Bed and Breakfast	December 1930	Walter Forde
P.C. Josser	January 1931	Milton Rosmer
Bracelets	February 1931	Sewell Collins
Third Time Lucky	February 1931	Walter Forde
The Stronger Sex	February 1931	Gareth Gundrey
The Sport of Kings	February 1931	Victor Saville
No Lady	May 1931	Lupino Lane
Down River	May 1931	Peter Godfrey
The Ringer	May 1931	Walter Forde
A Night in Montmartre	July 1931	Leslie Hiscott
The Hound of the Baskervilles	July 1931	Gareth Gundrey
The Man They Couldn't Arrest	August 1931	Hayes Hunter
The Ghost Train	September 1931	Walter Forde
The Happy Ending	October 1931	Millard Webb
Hindle Wakes	October 1931	Victor Saville
Michael and Mary	October 1931	Victor Saville
The Calendar	October 1931	Hayes Hunter
Sunshine Susie	December 1931	Victor Saville
A Gentleman of Paris	December 1931	Sinclair Hill
Congress Dances	December 1931	Erik Charell
Lord Babs	February 1932	Walter Forde
The Frightened Lady	March 1932	Hayes Hunter
The Faithful Heart	May 1932	Victor Saville
White Face	May 1932	Hayes Hunter
Jack's the Boy	June 1932	Walter Forde
Love on Wheels	July 1932	Victor Saville
Marry Me	October 1932	Wilhelm Thiele
Baroud	October 1932	Rex Ingram
Happy Ever After	October 1932	Paul Martin, Robert Stevenson
Tell Me Tonight	October 1932	Anatole Litvak
There Goes the Bride	October 1932	Albert de Courville
Rome Express	November 1932	Walter Forde
After the Ball	December 1932	Milton Rosmer
The Midshipmaid	December 1932	Albert de Courville
The Man from Toronto	January 1933	Sinclair Hill
The Good Companions	March 1933	George Pearson
Soldiers of the King	March 1933	Maurice Elvey
King of the Ritz	March 1933	Carmine Gallone
F.P.1	April 1933	Karl Hartl
The Only Girl	May 1933	Friedrich Hollaender
Sleeping Car	June 1933	Anatole Litvak
Waltz Time	June 1933	William Thiele
The Lucky Number	June 1933	Anthony Asquith
It's a Boy	July 1933	Tim Whelan
Falling for You	July 1933	Jack Hulbert, Robert Stevenson
Britannia of Billingsgate	July 1933	Sinclair Hill
Orders Is Orders	July 1933	Walter Forde
Early to Bed	July 1933	Ludwig Berger
The Ghoul	August 1933	Hayes Hunter
I Was a Spy	August 1933	Victor Saville
The Fire Raisers	September 1933	Michael Powell
Just Smith	September 1933	Tom Walls
Channel Crossing	October 1933	Milton Rosmer
A Cuckoo in the Nest	October 1933	Tom Walls
Friday the Thirteenth	November 1933	Victor Saville
The Constant Nymph	December 1933	Basil Dean
Aunt Sally	December 1933	Tim Whelan
Turkey Time	December 1933	Tom Walls
Jack Ahoy	February 1934	Walter Forde
The Night of the Party	February 1934	Michael Powell
Red Ensign	February 1934	Michael Powell
Waltzes from Vienna	February 1934	Alfred Hitchcock
Unfinished Symphony	March 1934	Willi Forst
The Battle	March 1934	Nicholas Farkas
Princess Charming	April 1934	Maurice Elvey
Evergreen	April 1934	Victor Saville
A Cup of Kindness	May 1934	Tom Walls
Wild Boy	May 1934	Albert de Courville
Chu Chin Chow	July 1934	Walter Forde
My Song for You	August 1934	Maurice Elvey
Little Friend	August 1934	Berthold Viertel
Evensong	October 1934	Victor Saville
My Old Dutch	October 1934	Sinclair Hill
The Camels Are Coming	October 1934	Tim Whelan
Jew Süss	October 1934	Lothar Mendes
My Heart Is Calling	December 1934	Carmine Gallone
Lady in Danger	December 1934	Tom Walls
Road House	December 1934	Maurice Elvey
The Man Who Knew Too Much	December 1934	Alfred Hitchcock
Dirty Work	December 1934	Tom Walls
Temptation	December 1934	Max Neufeld
The Iron Duke	January 1935	Victor Saville
Things Are Looking Up	January 1935	Albert de Courville
The Phantom Light	January 1935	Michael Powell
Oh, Daddy!	February 1935	Graham Cutts
Fighting Stock	March 1935	Tom Walls
Heat Wave	May 1935	Maurice Elvey
Bulldog Jack	May 1935	Walter Forde
Forever England	May 1935	Walter Forde
The 39 Steps	June 1935	Alfred Hitchcock
The Divine Spark	June 1935	Carmine Gallone
The Clairvoyant	August 1935	Maurice Elvey
Me and Marlborough	August 1935	Victor Saville
Stormy Weather	August 1935	Tom Walls
Boys Will Be Boys	August 1935	William Beaudine
Car of Dreams	September 1935	Graham Cutts
The Passing of the Third Floor Back	September 1935	Berthold Viertel
The Guv'nor	October 1935	Milton Rosmer
First a Girl	November 1935	Victor Saville
The Tunnel	November 1935	Maurice Elvey
Foreign Affaires	December 1935	Tom Walls
King of the Damned	January 1935	Walter Forde
Jack of All Trades	February 1936	Jack Hulbert, Robert Stevenson
First Offence	March 1936	Herbert Mason
Rhodes of Africa	March 1936	Berthold Viertel
Pot Luck	April 1936	Tom Walls
Tudor Rose	May 1936	Robert Stevenson
It's Love Again	May 1936	Victor Saville
Secret Agent	May 1936	Alfred Hitchcock
Where There's a Will	June 1936	William Beaudine
Seven Sinners	July 1936	Albert de Courville
Everything Is Thunder	August 1936	Milton Rosmer
East Meets West	September 1936	Herbert Mason
The Man Who Changed His Mind	September 1936	Robert Stevenson
Everybody Dance	October 1936	Charles Reisner
His Lordship	November 1936	Herbert Mason
All In	November 1936	Marcel Varnel
Strangers on Honeymoon	November 1936	Albert de Courville
Sabotage	December 1936	Alfred Hitchcock
Windbag the Sailor	December 1936	William Beaudine
The Flying Doctor	December 1936	Miles Mander
OHMS	January 1937	Raoul Walsh
Good Morning, Boys	February 1937	Marcel Varnel
Head Over Heels	February 1937	Sonnie Hale
The Great Barrier	February 1937	Milton Rosmer
O-Kay for Sound	April 1937	Marcel Varnel
Take My Tip	May 1937	Herbert Mason
King Solomon's Mines	July 1937	Robert Stevenson
Said O'Reilly to McNab	July 1937	William Beaudine
Gangway	August 1937	Sonnie Hale
Doctor Syn	August 1937	Roy William Neill
Non-Stop New York	September 1937	Robert Stevenson
Oh, Mr Porter!	October 1937	Marcel Varnel
Young and Innocent	November 1937	Alfred Hitchcock
Owd Bob	January 1938	Robert Stevenson
Bank Holiday	January 1938	Carol Reed
Sailing Along	February 1938	Sonnie Hale
Strange Boarders	June 1938	Herbert Mason
Convict 99	June 1938	Marcel Varnel
Alf's Button Afloat	July 1938	Marcel Varnel
The Lady Vanishes	September 1938	Alfred Hitchcock
Hey! Hey! USA	October 1938	Marcel Varnel
Crackerjack	October 1938	Albert de Courville
Climbing High	December 1938	Carol Reed
Old Bones of the River	December 1938	Marcel Varnel
Ask a Policeman	May 1939	Marcel Varnel
A Girl Must Live	May 1939	Carol Reed
Where's That Fire?	August 1939	Marcel Varnel
The Frozen Limits	November 1939	Marcel Varnel
Inspector Hornleigh on Holiday	November 1939	Walter Forde

== 1940s ==
Title	Release date	Director
Band Waggon	January 1940	Marcel Varnel
They Came by Night	February 1940	Harry Lachman
For Freedom	April 1940	Maurice Elvey
Charley's (Big-Hearted) Aunt	April 1940	Walter Forde
Night Train to Munich	May 1940	Carol Reed
Girl in the News	August 1940	Carol Reed
Gasbags	November 1940	Marcel Varnel
Neutral Port	November 1940	Marcel Varnel
The Ghost Train	March 1941	Walter Forde
Inspector Hornleigh Goes To It	March 1941	Walter Forde
Kipps	March 1941	Carol Reed
Once a Crook	June 1941	Herbert Mason
Cottage to Let	August 1941	Anthony Asquith
I Thank You	September 1941	Marcel Varnel
Hi Gang!	December 1941	Marcel Varnel
Back-Room Boy	April 1942	Herbert Mason
The Young Mr. Pitt	June 1942	Carol Reed
Uncensored	July 1942	Anthony Asquith
King Arthur Was a Gentleman	December 1942	Marcel Varnel
It's That Man Again	February 1943	Walter Forde
We Dive at Dawn	April 1943	Anthony Asquith
Miss London Ltd.	May 1943	Val Guest
The Man in Grey	July 1943	Leslie Arliss
Dear Octopus	August 1943	Harold French
Millions Like Us	September 1943	Sidney Gilliat, Frank Launder
Time Flies	February 1944	Walter Forde
Victory Wedding	1944	Jessie Matthews
Bees in Paradise	March 1944	Val Guest
Fanny by Gaslight	May 1944	Anthony Asquith
Give Us the Moon	July 1944	Val Guest
Two Thousand Women	August 1944	Fran Launder
Love Story	October 1944	Leslie Arliss
Madonna of the Seven Moons	December 1944	Arthur Crabtree
Waterloo Road	January 1945	Sidney Gilliat
A Place of One's Own	March 1945	Bernard Knowles
They Were Sisters	April 1945	Arthur Crabtree
I'll Be Your Sweetheart	June 1945	Val Guest
The Wicked Lady	December 1945	Leslie Arliss
Caravan	April 1946	Arthur Crabtree
The Magic Bow	October 1946	Bernard Knowles
The Root of All Evil	February 1947	Brock Williams
The Man Within	April 1947	Bernard Knowles
The Brothers	May 1947	David MacDonald
Dear Murderer	June 1947	Arthur Crabtree
The Upturned Glass	June 1947	Lawrence Huntington
Holiday Camp	August 1947	Ken Annakin
Jassy	August 1947	Bernard Knowles
When the Bough Breaks	November 1947	Lawrence Huntington
Easy Money	January 1948	Bernard Knowles
Snowbound	March 1948	David MacDonald
Miranda	April 1948	Ken Annakin
Broken Journey	April 1948	Ken Annakin
Good-Time Girl	May 1948	David MacDonald
The Calendar	June 1948	Arthur Crabtree
My Brother's Keeper	July 1948	Alfred Roome
The Blind Goddess	September 1948	Harold French
Quartet	October 1948	Ken Annakin, Arthur Crabtree; Harold French, Ralph Smart
Here Come the Huggetts	November 1948	Ken Annakin
Portrait from Life	December 1948	Terence Fisher
Vote for Huggett	February 1949	Ken Annakin
The Bad Lord Byron	March 1949	David MacDonald
It's Not Cricket	April 1949	Alfred Roome
A Boy, a Girl and a Bike	April 1949	Ralph Smart
The Huggetts Abroad	May 1949	Ken Annakin
Marry Me!	June 1949	Terence Fisher
Christopher Columbus	June 1949	David MacDonald
Helter Skelter	July 1949	Ralph Thomas
Don't Ever Leave Me	July 1949	Arthur Crabtree
The Lost People	July 1949	Bernard Knowles, Muriel Box
Diamond City	October 1949	David MacDonald
Boys in Brown	December 1949	Montgomery Tully
Traveller's Joy	December 1949	Ralph Thomas

== 1950s ==
Title	Release date	Director
The Astonished Heart	March 1950	Terence Fisher
So Long at the Fair	May 1950	Terence Fisher
Trio	July 1950	Ken Annakin, Harold French

== See also ==
- List of Stoll Pictures films
- List of Ealing Studios films
- List of British and Dominions films
- List of British Lion films
- List of British National films
- List of Two Cities Films
- List of General Film Distributors films
- List of Paramount British films

== Bibliography ==
- Cook, Pam. Gainsborough Pictures. Cassell, 1997.
