= Julien Mitchell =

English actor (1888–1954)

Mitchell (right) with James Mason in Hotel Reserve (1944)

Julien Mitchell (13 November 1888 – 4 November 1954) was an English actor, in films from the mid-1930s. Mitchell supported comedians George Formby and Will Hay, and appeared in some Hollywood films in the early war years, but is perhaps best remembered for his role as a mad train driver in the quota quickie The Last Journey, made at the start of his film career in 1936.

Mitchell was born in Glossop, Derbyshire. His parents were Julien Mitchell, a dentist, born in Haworth, West Riding of Yorkshire, and Ellen Kitchen, born in Bolton (in the Moor), Lancashire. His siblings born in Bolton were Martha Elizabeth, Josephine Mariner, Ada and Gertrude, while Mary Hannah and Hilda were born in Glossop.

Mitchell died in London in 1954, aged 65.

== Partial filmography ==
- Rhodes of Africa (1936) - Minor Role (uncredited)
- The Last Journey (1936) - Bob Holt
- Educated Evans (1936) - Arthur Hackitt
- The Frog (1937) - John Maitland
- Double Exposures (1937) - Hector Rodman
- Mr. Smith Carries On (1937) - Mr. Minox
- Quiet Please (1938) - Holloway
- The Drum (1938) - Sergeant
- It's in the Air (1938) - Sergeant Major
- Lucky to Me (1939) - Butterworth (uncredited)
- Vigil in the Night (1940) - Matthew Bowley
- The Sea Hawk (1940) - Oliver Scott
- The Goose Steps Out (1942) - Gen. Von Goltz
- Rhythm Serenade (1943) - Mr. Jimson
- Schweik's New Adventures (1943) - Gestapo Chief
- Hotel Reserve (1944) - Michel Beghin, intelligence chief
- The Echo Murders (1945) - James Duncan
- Bedelia (1946) - Dr. McAfee
- Bonnie Prince Charlie (1948) - Gen. Cope (uncredited)
- A Boy, a Girl and a Bike (1949) - Mr. Howarth
- Chance of a Lifetime (1950) - Morris
- The Magnet (1950) - The Mayor
- The Galloping Major (1951) - Sergeant Adair
- High Treason (1951) - Mr. Philips - Union Rep (uncredited)
- Hobson's Choice (1954) - Sam Minns
- John Wesley (1954) - Tom Dekkar (final film role)
