= Schweik's New Adventures =

1943 British film by Karel Lamač

- Trade show advertisement
- Directed by: Karel Lamač
- Written by: Karel Lamac; Con West
- Produced by: Walter Sors; Edward G. Whiting
- Starring: Lloyd Pearson; Maggie Rennie; Richard Attenborough; Julien Mitchell
- Cinematography: Robert LaPresle; Billie Williams
- Music by: Clifton Parker
- Production company: Eden Films
- Distributed by: Coronel Pictures
- Release date: 18 October 1943
- Running time: 84 minutes
- Country: United Kingdom
- Language: English

Schweik's New Adventures (also known as Good Schweik v. The Gestapo and It Started at Midnight) is a 1943 British comedy film, directed by Karel Lamač and starring Lloyd Pearson, Maggie Rennie, Richard Attenborough and Julien Mitchell. It was written by Lamač and Con West, adapted from the 1921 novel Good Soldier Švejk by Jaroslav Hašek. The music was by Clifton Parker, his first film score. It was shot at the Merton Park Studios in London.

== Plot ==
Czech humorist Josef Schweikand out-wits the Nazis during the a series of adventures. He is arrested, released, then employed as butler to the chief of the Gestapo; he fiinds secret plans, assists on a sabotage mission, and is mistaken for a Russian parachutist.

== Cast ==
- Lloyd Pearson as Josef Schweik
- Maggie Rennie as Madame Lidia Karová
- Richard Attenborough as railway worker
- Julien Mitchell as Gestapo Chief
- George Carney as Gendarme
- Muriel George as Mrs. Millerová
- Anthony Holles as opera manager
- Eliot Makeham as Professor Jan Borski
- Jan Masaryk as narrator

== Reception ==
The Monthly Film Bulletin wrote: "There is a good idea in the film story which is handled in a woefully ham-handed fashion. All the time the film is trying to burst its bonds but never succeeds. The direction is slow, the editing uneven and Lloyd Pearson as Schweik is never able to make the most of his role."

Kine Weekly wrote: "There is nothing pretentious about the production. It is simple, naive humour put over at the expense of the Germans, but now and then the tragic position of the Czechs is stressed. Actually, it is a plea for the nation to be of good heart and trick the aggressors as often as possible. That was the idea of the book which was published secretly in Czecho Slovakia. Schweik was a character in World War No. 1, when Hasek's book, Good Soldier Schweik, became a bestseller. The main criticism is that there are too many English colloquialisms and the picture runs rather to length."

== Bibliography ==
- Murphy, Robert. British Cinema and the Second World War. A&C Black, 2005.
