= List of Two Cities Films =

This is a list of films released by the British company Two Cities Films. From 1944 it became part of the Rank Organisation, but continued to maintain a separate brand.

| Title | Release date | Director |
|---|---|---|
| 13 Men and a Gun | June 1938 | Mario Zampi |
| French Without Tears | 1939 | Anthony Asquith |
| Spy for a Day | April 1940 | Mario Zampi |
| Freedom Radio | February 1941 | Anthony Asquith |
| Unpublished Story | August 1942 | Harold French |
| In Which We Serve | September 1942 | Noël Coward, David Lean |
| The Gentle Sex | April 1943 | Leslie Howard |
| The Flemish Farm | September 1943 | Jeffrey Dell |
| The Demi-Paradise | November 1943 | Anthony Asquith |
| The Lamp Still Burns | November 1943 | Maurice Elvey |
| This Happy Breed | April 1944 | David Lean |
| Tawny Pipit | April 1944 | Bernard Miles, Charles Saunders |
| The Way Ahead | June 1944 | Carol Reed |
| English Without Tears | July 1944 | Harold French |
| Mr. Emmanuel | October 1944 | Harold French |
| Don't Take It to Heart | November 1944 | Jeffrey Dell |
| Henry V | November 1944 | Laurence Olivier |
| Blithe Spirit | May 1945 | David Lean |
| The Way to the Stars | June 1945 | Anthony Asquith |
| Beware of Pity | July 1946 | Maurice Elvey |
| Men of Two Worlds | September 1946 | Thorold Dickinson |
| School for Secrets | November 1946 | Peter Ustinov |
| Carnival | December 1946 | Stanley Haynes |
| Hungry Hill | January 1947 | Brian Desmond Hurst |
| Odd Man Out | February 1947 | Carol Reed |
| The October Man | August 1947 | Roy Ward Baker |
| Fame Is the Spur | September 1947 | Roy Boulting |
| Uncle Silas | October 1947 | Charles Frank |
| The Mark of Cain | December 1947 | Brian Desmond Hurst |
| Vice Versa | January 1948 | Peter Ustinov |
| One Night with You | April 1948 | Terence Young |
| Hamlet | May 1948 | Laurence Olivier |
| Mr. Perrin and Mr. Traill | August 1948 | Lawrence Huntington |
| The Weaker Sex | September 1948 | Roy Ward Baker |
| Sleeping Car to Trieste | October 1948 | John Paddy Carstairs |
| Woman Hater | October 1948 | Terence Young |
| It's Hard to Be Good | November 1948 | Jeffrey Dell |
| The History of Mr. Polly | February 1949 | Anthony Pelissier |
| Cardboard Cavalier | March 1949 | Walter Forde |
| The Perfect Woman | May 1949 | Bernard Knowles |
| Adam and Evelyne | May 1949 | Harold French |
| Trottie True | August 1949 | Brian Desmond Hurst |
| Madness of the Heart | August 1949 | Charles Bennett |
| The Chiltern Hundreds | September 1949 | John Paddy Carstairs |
| The Rocking Horse Winner | November 1949 | Anthony Pelissier |
| They Were Not Divided | March 1950 | Terence Young |
| The Reluctant Widow | May 1950 | Bernard Knowles |
| Prelude to Fame | May 1950 | Fergus McDonell |
| Highly Dangerous | December 1950 | Roy Ward Baker |
| Encore | November 1951 | Pat Jackson, Anthony Pelissier, Harold French |
| The Net | February 1953 | Anthony Asquith |
| Personal Affair | December 1953 | Anthony Pelissier |
| Trouble in Store | December 1953 | John Paddy Carstairs |
| The Purple Plain | September 1954 | Robert Parrish |
| One Good Turn | January 1955 | John Paddy Carstairs |
| To Paris with Love | January 1955 | Robert Hamer |

== See also ==
- List of Stoll Pictures films
- List of Gainsborough Pictures films
- List of British and Dominions films
- List of British Lion films
- List of Ealing Studios films
- List of British National films
- List of General Film Distributors films
- List of Paramount British films

== Bibliography ==
- Macnab, Geoffrey. J. Arthur Rank and the British Film Industry. Routledge, 1994.
