= Murder at the Cabaret =

- Directed by: Reginald Fogwell
- Screenplay by: Reginald Fogwell
- Story by: Reginald Fogwell; Percy Robinson
- Produced by: Nell Emerald; Reginald Fogwell
- Starring: Phyllis Robins; Freddie Forbes; James Carew; Frederick Peisley; Kenneth Warrington; Peggy Crawford
- Cinematography: Roy Fogwell
- Production company: MB Productions Ltd.
- Distributed by: Paramount British Pictures
- Release date: December 1936
- Running time: 67 minutes

Murder at the Cabaret (also known as Cabaret Murder) is a 1936 British crime film directed by Reginald Fogwell and starring Phyllis Robins, Freddie Forbes, James Carew and Frederick Peisley. It was written by Fogwell and Percy Robinson, and produced as a quota quickie.

== Premise ==
Toni is an unpleasant philandering nightclub singer, loved by fellow-entertainer Jean, but he prefers Tasha, the dancer wife of the club's compere. Stage manager Jimmy is in love with Jean, and resents Toni's poor treatment of her. During a show, Toni is murdered. Jean, Jimmy, the compere, and a jealous husband of one of Toni's many conquests, are all suspects. The investigating detective is, however, able to identify the culprit.

== Cast ==
- Phyllis Robins as Jean
- Freddie Forbes as Freddie
- James Carew as the husband
- Frederick Peisley as Jimmy
- Kenneth Warrington as Toni
- Peggy Crawford as the wife
- Miska as Tasha

== Reception ==
The Monthly Film Bulletin wrote: "The production is weak throughout, with no proper sustaining of film sequence; cutting is bad and the settings are mediocre. Whether or not the scenario is to blame, none of the artists give good performances."

Kine Weekly wrote: "'This picture is nothing but a cheap pot-boiler. Neither ingenuity nor imagination figures in the fashioning of the plot ... The Americans are so hot at putting over this type of musical crime play – many illustrations can be found in Paramount's own output – that the crudity of this production is all the more pointed. The story is really childish, the direction weakly imitative, the acting feeble, and the musical divertissement amateurish. In fact, apart from the quota ticket there is no earthly angle of recommendation."

Film Weekly wrote: "This picture screams aloud the fact that it is a British quota quickie... None of players scores at all, and direction is uninspired and slow."
