= The Island of Despair =

1926 film

- Directed by: Henry Edwards
- Written by: Margot Neville
- Starring: Matheson Lang; Marjorie Hume; Gordon Hopkirk; Cyril McLaglen
- Production company: Stoll Pictures
- Distributed by: Stoll Pictures
- Release date: 27 December 1926
- Country: United Kingdom
- Languages: Silent; English intertitles

Margot Neville

The Island of Despair is a 1926 British drama film directed by Henry Edwards and starring Matheson Lang, Marjorie Hume and Gordon Hopkirk. It was based on a novel by Margot Neville.

== Cast ==
- Matheson Lang - Stephen Rhodes
- Marjorie Hume - Christine Vereker
- Gordon Hopkirk - Don Felipe Trevaras
- Jean Bradin - Colin Vereker
- Cyril McLaglen - Mate
- J. Fisher White - Doctor Blake
