= The Notorious Mrs. Carrick =

1924 film

- Directed by: George Ridgwell
- Based on: Pools of the Past by Charles Proctor
- Starring: Cameron Carr; A.B. Imeson; Gordon Hopkirk
- Production company: Stoll Pictures
- Distributed by: Stoll Pictures
- Release date: July 1924
- Running time: 73 minutes
- Country: United Kingdom
- Languages: Silent; English intertitles

The Notorious Mrs. Carrick is a 1924 British silent crime film directed by George Ridgwell and starring Cameron Carr, A.B. Imeson and Gordon Hopkirk. It was an adaptation of the novel Pools of the Past by Charles Proctor. The film was made by Britain's largest film company of the era Stoll Pictures.

== Cast ==
- Cameron Carr as David Carrick
- A.B. Imeson as Tony Tregarthen
- Gordon Hopkirk as Gerald Rosario
- Sydney Folker as David Arman
- Jack Denton as Allen Richards
- Disa as Sybil Tregarthen
- Peggy Lynn as Honor Tregarthen
- Basil Saunders as Inspector Samson
- Arthur Lumley as Owen Lawson
