= White Slippers =

1924 film

- Directed by: Sinclair Hill
- Written by: Charles Edholm (novel); Sinclair Hill
- Starring: Matheson Lang; Joan Lockton; Gordon Hopkirk
- Production company: Stoll Pictures
- Distributed by: Stoll Pictures
- Release date: August 1924
- Country: United Kingdom
- Languages: Silent; English intertitles

White Slippers is a 1924 British silent adventure film directed by Sinclair Hill and starring Matheson Lang, Joan Lockton and Gordon Hopkirk. It was based on a novel by Charles Edholm. It is set in Mexico and is known by the alternative title The Port of Lost Souls.

== Cast ==
- Matheson Lang as Lionel Hazard
- Joan Lockton as Alice
- Gordon Hopkirk as Ramon Guitterez
- Arthur McLaglen as Lorenzo
- Nelson Ramsey as Hairy Joe
- Irene Tripod as Dona Pilar
- Jack McEwen as Mexican Rat
- Adeline Hayden Coffin as Mother

== Bibliography ==
- Low, Rachael. History of the British Film, 1918-1929. George Allen & Unwin, 1971.
