= Lucky Jade =

1937 film directed by Walter Summers

- Directed by: Walter Summers
- Written by: Jane Browne; Walter Summers
- Produced by: Fred Browett
- Starring: Betty Ann Davies; John Warwick; Syd Crossley
- Cinematography: Horace Wheddon
- Edited by: Ted Richards
- Production company: Welwyn Productions
- Distributed by: Paramount British Pictures
- Release date: 19 July 1937
- Running time: 69 minutes
- Country: United Kingdom
- Language: English

Lucky Jade is a 1937 British comedy crime film directed by Walter Summers and starring Betty Ann Davies, John Warwick and Syd Crossley. It was written by Jane Browne and Summers, and shot at Welwyn Studios with sets designed by the art director Duncan Sutherland. It was a quota quickie released by the British subsidiary of Paramount Pictures.

== Plot ==
A collector of jade has an accident leading to the theft of his valuable collection, with a maid posing as an actress wrongly suspected of the crime.

== Cast ==
- Betty Ann Davies as Betsy Bunn
- John Warwick as John Marsden
- Claire Arnold as Mrs Sparsely
- Syd Crossley as Rickets
- Derek Gorst as Bob Grant
- Gordon Court as Ricky Rickhart
- Richard Littledale as Dingbat Eisan
- Tony Wylde as Whitebait

== Reception ==
The Monthly Film Bulletin wrote: "The direction is fast and humorous and the excitement is well sustained. The dialogue is crisp and the acting good. The photography is competent."

Kine Weekly wrote: "This picture has not a great deal to recommend it. The complexities of the plot are out of proportion to the amount of entertainment it promotes, and matters are not helped by the players, most of whom have no great sense of character. The director, too, finds it difficult to marshal his forces. Scrappy and somewhat childish, the film is just another quota booking for the not too sophisticated."

Picture Show wrote: "Betty Ann Davies does her best with poor material."

Film Weekly wrote: "This picture has 'quota' written all over it. It is completely lacking in any fine points. ... Betty Ann Davies strives hard to give conviction to the role of the parlourmaid, but falls to do so, and very few members of the cast succeed in doing anything with their parts. Nor does the direction lift the picture from its mediocre level."
