= The Mad Hatters =

- Press sheet
- Directed by: Ivar Campbell
- Written by: Christine Jope-Slade
- Produced by: Anthony Havelock-Allan
- Production company: British & Dominions Film Corporation
- Distributed by: Paramount British Pictures
- Release date: July 1935
- Running time: 70 minutes
- Country: United Kingdom
- Language: English

The Mad Hatters (also known as The Mad Hatter) is a 1935 British comedy film directed by Ivar Campbell and starring Chili Bouchier, Sydney King and Evelyn Foster. It was written by Christine Jope-Slade, and was made as a quota quickie by British & Dominions Film Corporation.

== Preservation status ==
The British Film Institute National Archive holds a collection of ephemera but no film or video materials.

== Plot ==
After opening a hat shop together, two men fall in love with a French woman living next door.

== Cast ==
- Chili Bouchier as Vicki
- Sydney King as Tim Stanhope
- Evelyn Foster as Ruth Stanhope
- Kim Peacock as Joe
- Grace Lane as Mrs. Stanhope
- Bellenden Clarke as General Stanhope
- Tosca von Bissing as Duchess
- Vera Bogetti as Lady Felicity

== Reception ==
Kine Weekly wrote: "Fimsy comedy of impoverished society youths' venture into business as proprietors of fashionable hat shop, which, while not exactly hilarious, may be a useful second feature proposition. ... Film is technically quite good, though wordy, and dialogue is reasonably bright."

The Daily Film Renter wrote: "Well staged subject has been unimaginatively directed, and suffers from paucity of narrative. Quota support for not too critical. ...This nebulous story has been directed with little imagination, but it must be admitted it could have offered little in the way of worthwhile material."
