= Faces (1934 film) =

- Advertisement
- Directed by: Sidney Morgan
- Written by: Patrick Ludlow (play); Joan Morgan; Walter Sondes (play)
- Produced by: Herbert Wilcox
- Starring: Anna Lee; Harold French; Walter Sondes
- Production company: British and Dominions
- Distributed by: Paramount British
- Release date: 26 January 1934
- Running time: 68 minutes
- Country: United Kingdom
- Language: English

Faces is a 1934 British comedy-drama film directed by Sidney Morgan and starring Anna Lee, Harold French and Walter Sondes. It was written by Joan Morgan, and Sondes and Patrick Ludlow based on their 1932 play.

== Plot ==
Madeleine Pelham is an assistant in a fashionable West End beauty parlour. Tired of her boring life she is tempted to become the mistress of wealthy businessman Dick Morris. Realising that Morris's wife is the parlour's best client, she soon realises her dalliance is a mistake, and returns to her fiancée Ted.

== Cast ==
- Anna Lee as Madeleine Pelham
- Harold French as Ted
- Walter Sondes as Dick Morris
- Moore Marriott as Robert Pelham
- Kate Saxon as Mrs. Pelham
- Beryl de Querton as Amy Amor
- Noel Shannon as Alphonse
- Olive Sloane as Lady Wallingford

== Reception ==
The Daily Film Renter wrote: "Drama, interspersed with comedy, around assistant and patrons in West End beauty parlour. Light touches provided by sequences of suburban home life and ambitious titled women who desire rejuvenation. Excellent performance by Anna Lee in leading role; reasonable support from remainder of cast. Competent direction and authentic settings provide useful booking for popular halls, with appeal for women patrons."

Kine Weekly wrote: "The situations are rather obvious in construction but the individual acting is competent and introduces emotional as well as feminine interest. Fair average two-feature programe booking for the masses."
