= Incident in Shanghai =

- Directed by: John Paddy Carstairs
- Written by: A. R. Rawlinson
- Based on: an original story by John Paddy Carstairs
- Produced by: Anthony Havelock-Allan
- Starring: Margaret Vyner; Patrick Barr; Derek Gorst
- Cinematography: Francis Carver
- Edited by: Lister Laurance
- Production company: British & Dominions Film Corporation
- Distributed by: Paramount British Pictures (UK)
- Release date: 25 January 1938 (London)
- Running time: 67 minutes
- Country: United Kingdom
- Language: English

Incident in Shanghai is a 1938 British drama film directed by John Paddy Carstairs and starring Margaret Vyner, Patrick Barr, Ralph Roberts and Derek Gorst. It was made at Pinewood Studios as a quota quickie for release by Paramount Pictures. It was shot in eleven days on a budget of £7,000.

It was considered to have topical interest for audiences due to the ongoing Second Sino-Japanese War.

== Plot ==
In Shanghai, Madeleine Linden is an unhappy wife who falls in love with wounded pilot Pat Avon, upon whom her husband Brian, the head of the Red Cross, must operate.

== Cast ==
- Margaret Vyner as Madeleine Linden
- Patrick Barr as Pat Avon
- Ralph Roberts as Robert Barlow
- Derek Gorst as Brian Linden
- John Deverell as Weepie
- George Courtney as Mel Purdue
- Lotus Fragrance as Butterfly Ku
- Rita Davies as Ada Newell

== Critical reception ==
TV Guide called it a "...plodding romantic drama."

== Bibliography ==
- Chibnall, Steve. Quota Quickies: The Birth of the British 'B' Film. British Film Institute, 2007.
