= Mr. Smith Carries On =

- Scene from the film, from Press Book
- Directed by: Lister Laurance
- Written by: Stephen Clarkson; John Cousins; Ronald Gow
- Produced by: Anthony Havelock-Allan
- Starring: Edward Rigby; Julien Mitchell; H. F. Maltby; Franklyn Bellamy
- Cinematography: Francis Carver
- Edited by: Lister Laurance
- Production companies: British & Dominions Film Corporation
- Distributed by: Paramount British Pictures
- Release date: September 1937
- Running time: 68 minutes
- Country: United Kingdom
- Language: English

Mr. Smith Carries On is a 1937 British crime film directed by Lister Laurance and starring Edward Rigby, Julien Mitchell and H. F. Maltby. It was written by Stephen Clarkson, John Cousins and Ronald Gow, and was made at Pinewood Studios as a quota quickie for release by Paramount Pictures. The screenplay concerns a secretary who accidentally shoots a business tycoon.

== Preservation status ==
The British Film Institute National Archive holds a collection of ephemera and stills but no film or video materials.

== Plot ==
Minos, a financier, is negotiating a big deal and aks his clerk, Mr. Smith, to help him urgently obtain the money he needs. Because what Minos is asking is unlawful, Smith refuses to help. When Minos threatens to kill himself the two men clash, and Minos is accidentally killed by the revolver he is holding. Smith realises that if Minos's death becomes known the deal is off, and thousands of small investors will face ruin. He decides to conceal the body, obtain the money and conclude the deal. Although subsequently accused of murder, the truth comes out and he is released.

== Cast ==
- Edward Rigby as Mr. Smith
- Julien Mitchell as Mr. Minos
- H. F. Maltby as Sir Felix
- Dorothy Oldfield as Hilary Smith
- Basil Langton as Jerry Stone
- Franklyn Bellamy as Mr. Williams
- Margaret Emden as Mrs. Smith
- Frederick Culley as Mr. Fane
- Dorothy Dewhurst
- Joe Monkhouse
- John Singer as boy

== Reception ==
The Monthly Film Bulletin wrote: "This unpretentious story has real dramatic value, and human interest. It is well worked out, and suspense is maintained up to the climax. Much of its success is due to the excellent acting of Edward Rigby who gives an admirable performance as the quiet, devoted, hard-working clerk ... The rest of the cast work hard and give adequate support."

The Daily Film Renter wrote: "While it must be admitted the business of High Finance as exemplified here seems ridiculously easy, the story manages to achieve a good deal of conviction, thanks mainly to the sterling work of Edward Rigby, as Mr. Smith. Here is an actor of the old school, who gets right under the skin of his characterisations, his portrayals invariably being of a polished type. Prominent in support is Dorothy Oldfield, who caters for the feminine element with charm."
