= Gentlemen's Agreement (film) =

1935 film by George Pearson

- Directed by: George Pearson
- Written by: Jennifer Howard; Basil Mason
- Produced by: Anthony Havelock-Allan
- Starring: Frederick Peisley; Vivien Leigh; Anthony Holles
- Cinematography: M. A. Andersen
- Edited by: Roland Reed
- Music by: Lee Zahler
- Production company: British & Dominions Film Corporation
- Distributed by: Paramount British Pictures
- Release date: April 1935
- Running time: 71 minutes
- Countries: United Kingdom; United States
- Language: English

Gentlemen's Agreement is a 1935 British black-and-white adventure film directed by George Pearson and starring Frederick Peisley and Vivien Leigh. It was written by Jennifer Howard and Basil Mason, and produced by British & Dominions Film Corporation and Paramount British Pictures.

== Preservation status ==
The British Film Institute's National Archive holds a pressbook for the film, but no stills, film or video materials.

== Synopsis ==
An educated rogue exchanges places with a down-and-out.

== Cast ==
- Frederick Peisley as Guy Carfax
- Vivien Leigh as Phil Stanley
- Anthony Holles as Bill Bentley
- David Horne as Sir Charles Lysle
- Vera Bogetti as Dora Deleamere
- Victor Stanley as Williams
- Ronald Shiner as Jim Ferrin
- Kate Saxon as Mrs. Ferrin

== Reception ==
Kine Weekly wrote: "Sociological romantic comedy. Too transparent in its plot to entertain other than the unsophisticated."

Picturegoer wrote: "Aimless and crudely planned story of a down-and-out and a spendthrift who change places, the former being suspected of business acumen in consequence and the latter finding romance with an out-of-work typist. The pace is very slow, and it is all so obvious and artificial that it fails to entertain very successfully."
