= Wednesday's Luck =

1936 film by George Pearson

- Lobby card
- Directed by: George Pearson
- Screenplay by: Edythe Pryce
- Produced by: Anthony Havelock-Allan
- Starring: Linden Travers; Patrick Barr; Wilson Coleman
- Cinematography: Francis Carver
- Production company: British and Dominions Film Corporation
- Release date: 1936
- Running time: 68 minutes
- Country: United Kingdom
- Language: English

Wednesday's Luck is a 1936 British crime film directed by George Pearson and starring Wilson Coleman, Susan Bligh, Patrick Barr and Moore Marriott. It was written by Edythe Pryce.

== Plot ==
A detective goes undercover to infiltrate a gang of criminals.

== Cast ==
- Wilson Coleman as Stevens
- Susan Bligh as Sheila
- Patrick Barr as Jim Carfax
- Moore Marriott as Nobby
- Paul Neville as Waddington
- Linden Travers as Mimi
- George Dewhurst as Wood

== Reception ==
Kine Weekly wrote: "If most of the dialogue had been rubbed out of the first half of this picture and had Susan Bligh's activities been considerably curbed, it would have stood an excellent chance of making the grade, for there is no denying that the story is written to deceive, and in deceiving, thrill. What might have been, however, is no concern of the public; what is, lacks that kick essential to mass appeal."

Picturegoer wrote: "A crime drama of the 'can-you-guess-the-end?' variety which contains plenty of ingenuity. It fails, however, to score a bull on the target of success and, being unable to register more than an 'outer,' cannot be considered anything approaching a winner."
