= Lister Laurance =

British film editor (1912–1977)

- Born: 13 February 1912; London, United Kingdom
- Died: 1977 (aged 64–65); London, United Kingdom
- Other name: Lister Montague Laurance
- Occupations: Film Editor, Director
- Years active: 1932–1950 (film)

Lister Laurance (1912–1977) was a British film editor. He edited over a dozen films from 1932 to 1950 and directed one film, Mr. Smith Carries On (1937).

== Selected filmography ==
=== Editor ===
- Frail Women (1932)
- In a Monastery Garden (1932)
- The Black Abbot (1934)
- Whispering Tongues (1934)
- The Admiral's Secret (1934)
- Music Hall (1934)
- Flood Tide (1934)
- D'Ye Ken John Peel? (1935)
- Night Ride (1937)
- Mr. Smith Carries On (1937)
- The Last Curtain (1937)
- Missing, Believed Married (1937)
- A Spot of Bother (1938)
- The Lambeth Walk (1939)
- An Englishman's Home (1940)
- The Glass Mountain (1949)
- The Girl Who Couldn't Quite (1950)
- Once a Sinner (1950)
- Lilli Marlene (1950)

=== Director ===
- Mr. Smith Carries On (1937)
