= List of British films of 1928 =

A list of British films released in 1928.

== 1928 ==
Title	Director	Cast	Genre	Notes
1928
Adam's Apple	Tim Whelan	Monty Banks, Lena Halliday	Comedy	
Adventurous Youth	Edward Godal	Derrick De Marney, Dino Galvani	Adventure	
Afterwards	Lawson Butt	Marjorie Hume, Julie Suedo	Drama	
Angst	Hans Steinhoff	Gustav Fröhlich, Henry Edwards	Drama	Co-production with Germany
Balaclava	Maurice Elvey, Milton Rosmer	Cyril McLaglen, Benita Hume	War	
The Blue Peter	Arthur Rooke	Matheson Lang, Gladys Frazin	Adventure	
Boadicea	Sinclair Hill	Phyllis Neilson-Terry, Lillian Hall-Davis, Clifford McLaglen	Historical	
Bolibar	Walter Summers	Elissa Landi, Michael Hogan	Adventure	
Champagne	Alfred Hitchcock	Betty Balfour, Gordon Harker, Jean Bradin, Fanny Wright	Comedy	
Chick	A. V. Bramble	Bramwell Fletcher, Trilby Clark	Drama	
The City of Youth	E. H. Calvert	Betty Faire, Lilian Oldland	Drama	
Cocktails	Monty Banks	Harald Madsen, Enid Stamp-Taylor	Comedy	
The Constant Nymph	Adrian Brunel	Ivor Novello, Mabel Poulton	Drama	
A Daughter in Revolt	Harry Hughes	Mabel Poulton, Edward O'Neill	Comedy	
Dawn	Herbert Wilcox	Sybil Thorndike, Gordon Craig	Drama	
Easy Virtue	Alfred Hitchcock	Isabel Jeans, Frank Elliott, Franklin Dyall	Drama	
The Farmer's Wife	Alfred Hitchcock	Jameson Thomas, Lillian Hall-Davis, Gordon Harker	Romantic comedy	
The First Born	Miles Mander	Madeleine Carroll, Miles Mander	Drama	
For Valour	G. B. Samuelson	Dallas Cairns, Roy Travers	War	
The Forger	G. B. Samuelson	Nigel Barrie, Lillian Rich	Crime	
The Gallant Hussar	Géza von Bolváry	Ivor Novello, Evelyn Holt	Romance	Co-production with Germany
God's Clay	Graham Cutts	Anny Ondra, Trilby Clark	Drama	
The Guns of Loos	Sinclair Hill	Henry Victor, Madeleine Carroll	War/drama	
The Hellcat	Harry Hughes	Mabel Poulton, Eric Bransby Williams	Romance/drama	
His House in Order	Randle Ayrton	Tallulah Bankhead, Ian Hunter	Drama	
Houp La!	Frank Miller	George Bellamy, Frank Stanmore	Comedy	
The Infamous Lady	Geoffrey Barkas, Michael Barringer	Arthur Wontner, Walter Tennyson	Drama	
A Knight in London	Lupu Pick	Lilian Harvey, Ivy Duke	Drama	
The Lady of the Lake	James A. FitzPatrick	Percy Marmont, Benita Hume	Romance	
Life	Adelqui Migliar	Adelqui Migliar, Marie Ault	Drama	
A Light Woman	Adrian Brunel	Benita Hume, Gerald Ames	Romance	
A Little Bit of Fluff	Wheeler Dryden	Syd Chaplin, Betty Balfour	Comedy	
Love's Option	George Pearson	Dorothy Boyd, Patrick Aherne	Adventure	
Mademoiselle Parley Voo	Maurice Elvey	Estelle Brody, John Stuart	Drama	
The Man Who Changed His Name	A. V. Bramble	Stewart Rome, Betty Faire	Thriller	
Maria Marten	Walter West	Trilby Clark, Warwick Ward	Melodrama	
Moulin Rouge	Ewald André Dupont	Olga Chekhova, Eve Gray	Drama	
Not Quite a Lady	Thomas Bentley	Blanche Sweet, Haddon Mason	Mystery	
Number 17	Géza von Bolváry	Guy Newall, Lien Deyers	Crime	Co-production with Germany
Palais de danse	Maurice Elvey	Mabel Poulton, John Longden	Drama	
Paradise	Denison Clift	Betty Balfour, Alexander D'Arcy	Drama	
The Passing of Mr. Quinn	Julius Hagen, Leslie S. Hiscott	Stewart Rome, Trilby Clark	Mystery	
The Physician	Georg Jacoby	Miles Mander, Elga Brink	Drama	
The Price of Divorce	Sinclair Hill	Wyndham Standing, Frances Day	Drama	
A Reckless Gamble	Widgey R. Newman	Wally Patch, Simeon Stuart	Sports	
The Ringer	Arthur Maude	Leslie Faber, Annette Benson	Crime	
The Rising Generation	Harley Knoles, George Dewhurst	Alice Joyce, Jameson Thomas	Comedy	
S.O.S.	Leslie S. Hiscott	Robert Loraine, Bramwell Fletcher	Adventure	
Sailors Don't Care	W. P. Kellino	Estelle Brody, John Stuart	Comedy	
The Second Mate	J. Steven Edwards	David Dunbar, Cecil Barry	Adventure	
Shiraz	Franz Osten	Himansu Rai, Enakshi Rama Rao	Drama	Co-production with Germany and India
Sir or Madam	Carl Boese	Percy Marmont, Ossi Oswalda	Comedy	Co-production with Germany
A South Sea Bubble	T. Hayes Hunter	Ivor Novello, Benita Hume, Alma Taylor	Comedy	
Spangles	George Banfield	Fern Andra, Forrester Harvey	Drama	
Sweeney Todd	Walter West	Moore Marriott, Judd Green	Crime	
Tesha	Victor Saville, Edwin Greenwood	María Corda, Jameson Thomas	Drama	
The Thoroughbred	Sidney Morgan	Ian Hunter, Louise Prussing	Sports	
Tommy Atkins	Norman Walker	Lillian Hall-Davis, Henry Victor	Drama	
Toni	Arthur Maude	Jack Buchanan, Dorothy Boyd	Thriller	
The Triumph of the Scarlet Pimpernel	T. Hayes Hunter	Matheson Lang, Juliette Compton	Drama	
Troublesome Wives	Harry Hughes	Eric Bransby Williams, Mabel Poulton	Comedy	
Two Little Drummer Boys	G. B. Samuelson	Alma Taylor, Derrick De Marney	Comedy	
Underground	Anthony Asquith	Brian Aherne, Elissa Landi	Drama	
The Valley of Ghosts	G. B. Samuelson	Miriam Seegar, Ian Hunter	Crime	
Victory	M. A. Wetherell	Moore Marriott, Walter Byron	War	
Virginia's Husband	Harry Hughes	Mabel Poulton, Lilian Oldland	Comedy	
The Vortex	Adrian Brunel	Ivor Novello, Willette Kershaw	Drama	
The Ware Case	Manning Haynes	Stewart Rome, Betty Carter	Drama	
The Warning	Reginald Fogwell	Percy Marmont, Fern Andra	Drama	
Weekend Wives	Harry Lachman	Monty Banks, Jameson Thomas	Comedy	
What Money Can Buy	Edwin Greenwood	Madeleine Carroll, Humberston Wright	Drama	
What Next?	Walter Forde	Pauline Johnson, Frank Stanmore	Comedy	
Whirl of Youth	Richard Eichberg	Fee Malten, Heinrich George	Drama	Co-production with Germany
The White Sheik	Harley Knoles	Lillian Hall-Davis, Jameson Thomas	Adventure	
Widecombe Fair	Norman Walker	William Freshman, Marguerite Allan	Comedy	
A Window in Piccadilly	Sidney Morgan	Joan Morgan, John F. Hamilton	Romance	
Yellow Stockings	Theodore Komisarjevsky	Percy Marmont, Enid Stamp-Taylor	Drama	
You Know What Sailors Are	Maurice Elvey	Alf Goddard, Chili Bouchier	Comedy	
Young Woodley	Thomas Bentley	Marjorie Hume, Sam Livesey	Drama	Never fully released; remade as a sound film in 1931
Zero	Jack Raymond	Stewart Rome, Fay Compton	Drama	

== See also ==
- 1928 in British music
- 1928 in British television
- 1928 in film
- 1928 in the United Kingdom
