= Andrew Mazzei =

British art director (1887–1975)

- Born: 2 August 1887; Le Havre, Seine-Maritime, Upper Normandy; France
- Died: 6 August 1975 (aged 88); Cornwall, England; United Kingdom
- Other name: André Jean Louis Mazzei
- Occupation: Art director
- Years active: 1926–1952 (film)

Andrew Mazzei 1931

Andrew Mazzei (1887–1975) was a French-born British art director who designed the sets for more than sixty films during his career. Mazzei began his career in the late 1920s during the silent era including on the futuristic High Treason. By the 1930s he was working for Gainsborough Pictures, designing backdrops for the critically acclaimed train-set thriller Rome Express in 1932.

His 1940s work includes Gainsborough melodramas such as Madonna of the Seven Moons and The Magic Bow as well as the film noirs The Upturned Glass and They Made Me a Fugitive. In 1947 he was employed on the Technicolor film The Man Within. Most of his final films during the early 1950s were lower budget crime thrillers.

== Early life ==
Andrew Mazzei was born André Jean Louis Mazzei in Le Havre, France on 2 August 1887 to Italian / French parentage.

His father, Giovanni Mazzei (born 1 August 1852 in Colognora di Val di Roggio, Pescaglia, Lucca, Tuscany, Italy – died 26 November 1930 in Lucca Hospital, Tuscany, Italy) was an Italian 'Plaster Figure Maker' who had moved to France to ply his trade. He married Andrew's mother, Evarestine Marie Lemen (born 29th Oct 1852 in Beauvoir, Vendée, France – died 28 June 1912 in Holborn, London, England) on 15 August 1881 in Nantes, France.

The family moved to London, England in 1891, where they stayed until Andrew was nine years of age when his father took him to Italy for 12 months. On returning, the family lived for a short time in Brighton and Manchester, and by 1901 they had settled in Blackpool. It was during this time that Andrew's father had contributed ornate plasterwork to the Tower Ballroom designed by Frank Matcham.

According to the 1911 census, Andrew had contributed decorative plasterwork to the Coronation Exhibition of George V.

Andrew married Alice Fairclough (1887–1973) on 7 October 1912 at South Shore, Fylde, Lancashire. They had no children.

During the First World War, Andrew was employed on the reconstruction of the late Lord Kitchener's house at Broome Park, Knowlton, Kent, where he was engaged on special modelling work. Andrew then went to work for a year for Messrs. Jordans, Brixton Hill, making artificial limbs for mutilated soldiers. On 14 March 1918, Andrew volunteered for the British Army and was graded 2. Messrs. Jordans pointed out to Andrew that the work he was engaged on was a necessity and applied for his exemption which was granted.

After the war, Andrew then worked for Messrs. J. Panichelli & sons, Hammersmith, on architectural and plasterwork until 1921 when he found employment with the film company, the "Famous Players–Lasky British Producers Limited."

== Selected filmography ==
- Mademoiselle from Armentieres (1926)
- The Flag Lieutenant (1926)
- Hindle Wakes (1927)
- Quinneys (1927)
- Roses of Picardy (1927)
- The Arcadians (1927)
- The Glad Eye (1927)
- Mademoiselle Parley Voo (1928)
- Palais de Danse (1928)
- The Flight Commander (1928)
- The Physician (1928)
- What Money Can Buy (1928)
- Gibbs Advert (1929)
- High Treason (1929)
- The Devil's Maze (1929)
- Alf's Button (1930)
- Greek Street (1930)
- The Great Game (1930)
- The Night Porter (1930)
- Thread O'Scarlet (1930)
- A Gentleman of Paris (1931)
- Bed and Breakfast (1931)
- Bracelets (1931)
- Down River (1931)
- The Happy Ending (1931)
- Hindle Wakes (1931)
- No Lady (1931)
- Rome Express (1932)
- Night of the Garter (1933)
- Prince of Arcadia (1933)
- The Blarney Stone (1933) (costumes)
- Two Hearts in Waltz Time (1934)
- In Town Tonight (1935)
- No Monkey Business (1935)
- Ten Minute Alibi (1935)
- The Case of Gabriel Perry (1935)
- The Deputy Drummer (1935)
- Turn of the Tide (1935)
- A Woman Alone (1936)
- Dusty Ermine (1936)
- The Luck of the Irish (1936)
- Spy of Napoleon (1936)
- The Man Behind the Mask (1936)
- The Man in the Mirror (1936)
- Clothes and the Woman (1937)
- The Missing Million (1942)
- Front Line Kids (1942)
- Gert and Daisy Clean Up (1942)
- Rose of Tralee (1942)
- Love Story (1944) (associate art director)
- I'll Be Your Sweetheart (1945)
- Madonna of the Seven Moons (1945)
- The Magic Bow (1946)
- Dancing with Crime (1947)
- Just William's Luck (1947)
- The Man Within (1947)
- The Upturned Glass (1947)
- They Made Me a Fugitive (1947)
- Daughter of Darkness (1948)
- The Small Voice (1948)
- This Was a Woman (1948)
- The Romantic Age (1950) (credited as Anthony Mazzei)
- 13 East Street (1952)
- Hindle Wakes (1952)
- The Frightened Man (1952)
- The Last Page (1952)
- The Lost Hours (1952)
- Wings of Danger (1952)

== Bibliography ==
- Spicer, Andrew. Sydney Box. Manchester University Press, 2006.
- Ede, Laurie N. British Film Design: A History. I.B.Tauris, 2010.
