= Kitty (1929 film) =

1929 film by Victor Saville

- Directed by: Victor Saville
- Written by: Benn Levy; Violet E. Powell; Marjorie Young; Warwick Deeping
- Produced by: Victor Saville
- Starring: Estelle Brody; John Stuart
- Cinematography: Jack E. Cox
- Edited by: Karl Puth
- Music by: W.L. Trytel (MD) Hubert Bath (uncredited)
- Distributed by: British International Pictures; Sono Art-World Wide Pictures
- Release date: May 1929
- Running time: 92 minutes
- Country: United Kingdom
- Languages: Sound (Part-Talkie); English Intertitles

Kitty is a 1929 sound part-talkie British drama film directed by Victor Saville and starring Estelle Brody and John Stuart. Due to the popularity of sound films, the American film company Sono Art-World Wide Pictures collaborated with B.I.P. to produce a sound version of the film for cinemas wired for sound. They recorded the soundtrack using the RCA Photophone sound system. In addition to sequences with audible dialogue or talking sequences, the film features a synchronized musical score and sound effects along with English intertitles. The film was adapted from the 1927 novel of the same name by Warwick Deeping and marked the third co-star billing of Brody and Stuart, who had previously proved a very popular screen pairing in Mademoiselle from Armentieres (1926) and Hindle Wakes (1927).

Kitty was initially planned and filmed as a silent, but after its original release Saville decided to reshoot the latter part with sound. As no suitable facilities were yet available in Britain, Saville, Brody and Stuart travelled to New York to shoot the new sequences at RKO Studios. The film was released in the form of a part-talkie and features a prologue with dialogue while the feature itself features a synchronized musical score with a singing sequence in which Estelle Brody sings the theme song of the film.

== Plot ==
In pre-World War I London, handsome young aviator Alex St. George (Stuart) meets and falls in love with shopgirl Kitty Greenwood (Brody). He asks her to marry him, to the horror of his snobbish, class-bound mother (Dorothy Cumming), who is appalled by the notion of her son marrying into a family who run a tobacconists shop. Before the wedding can take place, war breaks out and Alex is called up to serve as a pilot.

Seeing her opportunity to sabotage the relationship, Mrs. St. George sets about trying to poison Alex's mind against Kitty by feeding him via letter a string of malicious and false tales about Kitty's behaviour, alleging that in his absence she is frequently to be seen around town flirting and behaving in an improper manner with other young men. Alex becomes so unnerved and distraught about his mother's stories that his concentration is affected and he crashes his plane, suffering not only critical injuries which leave him in danger of paralysis, but also amnesia.

Alex is repatriated to England for treatment and faces a long and painful physical rehabilitation and the struggle to regain his memory, while at the same time a battle of wills is being waged by his mother and Kitty, both trying to convince him that the other is lying. Eventually Kitty succeeds in rekindling his love for her, and Mrs. St. George is crushed.

== Cast ==
- Estelle Brody as Kitty Greenwood
- John Stuart as Alex St. George
- Dorothy Cumming as Mrs. St. George
- Marie Ault as Sarah Greenwood
- Winter Hall as John Furnival
- Olaf Hytten as Leaper
- Charles O'Shaugnessy as Reuben
- Elwood Fleet Bostwick as Dr. Dazely
- Gibb McLaughlin as Electrician
- Rex Maurice as Dr. Drake
- Moore Marriott as Workman

== Music ==
The film featured a theme song entitled "How Can We Go On Parted" with lyrics composed by Raymond Wallace and music composed by Jimmy Campbell and Reg Connelly. The song is sung by Estelle Brody in the film and is also played instrumentally several times throughout the film.

== Historical significance ==
Kitty, released in May 1929, is sometimes cited as the first British sound film as it was released in cinemas before Alfred Hitchcock's Blackmail, the other candidate for the honour. But that date only actually applies to its first silent version; the film was soon withdrawn from exhibition and retooled as a part-talkie, following the release of Blackmail. Furthermore, opponents of its claim point out that the sound portion of Kitty was filmed in the US, whereas Blackmail was filmed entirely in the UK. Drawing the distinction between "first British film with sound" and "first sound film made in Britain", this view holds that the latter is the true definition of the term and the distinction therefore goes to Blackmail.

== See also ==
- List of early sound feature films (1926–1929)
