= A Sister to Assist 'Er (1927 film) =

1927 film

- Directed by: George Dewhurst
- Written by: George Dewhurst; John le Breton
- Based on: A Sister to Assist 'Er by John le Breton
- Produced by: Maurice Elvey; Gareth Gundrey; Victor Saville
- Starring: Mary Brough; Polly Emery; Humberston Wright; A. Bromley Davenport
- Cinematography: Percy Strong
- Production company: Gaumont British Picture Corporation
- Distributed by: Gaumont British Distributors
- Release date: 27 September 1927
- Running time: 6,000 feet
- Country: United Kingdom
- Language: English

A Sister to Assist 'Er is a 1927 British silent comedy film directed by George Dewhurst and starring Mary Brough, Polly Emery and Humberston Wright. It was based on the play A Sister to Assist 'Er by John le Breton.

== Cast ==
- Mary Brough as Mrs. May
- Polly Emery as Mrs. Mull
- Humberston Wright as Mr. Mull
- A. Bromley Davenport as Jim Harris
- Alf Goddard as Sailor
- Jack Harris as Alf

== Bibliography ==
- Low, Rachael. History of the British Film, 1918-1929. George Allen & Unwin, 1971.
