= Hindle Wakes (1931 film) =

1931 film

- Theatrical release poster
- Directed by: Victor Saville
- Written by: Victor Saville; Angus MacPhail; Stanley Houghton
- Produced by: Michael Balcon
- Starring: Belle Chrystall; John Stuart; Norman McKinnel
- Cinematography: Mutz Greenbaum
- Edited by: R. E. Dearing
- Music by: William Trytel
- Production company: Gainsborough Pictures
- Distributed by: Gaumont British Distributors
- Release date: 4 October 1931
- Running time: 79 minutes
- Country: United Kingdom
- Language: English

Hindle Wakes is a 1931 British drama film directed by Victor Saville for Gainsborough Pictures and starring Belle Chrystall and John Stuart. It was written by Saville and Angus MacPhail, adapted from Stanley Houghton's 1912 stage play of the same name, which had previously been filmed twice as a silent in 1918 and 1927. Saville had been the producer on the 1927 version directed by Maurice Elvey. Both Stuart and Norman McKinnel returned in 1931 to reprise their roles from the 1927 film.

== Plot ==
Lancashire mill-girls Jenny Hawthorne and Mary Hollins go on holiday to Blackpool during the annual wakes week in their hometown of Hindle. They run into Alan Jeffcote, the son of the owner of the mill in which they work, who has also traveled to Blackpool with a group of friends while his fiancée is detained on business in London. Jenny and Alan hit it off immediately, and he persuades her to leave Blackpool to spend the week with him at Llandudno in North Wales. To cover her tracks, Jenny leaves a postcard with Mary, asking her to send it to her parents later in the week. She and Alan leave their friends and set off for Wales.

Shortly afterwards, Mary is involved in a serious road accident and is killed. Her possessions are returned to Hindle and the unmailed postcard is found in her luggage. Jenny's parents are already suspicious and concerned by the fact that Jenny has not returned to Hindle as they would have expected in view of such a tragic turn to her holiday, and the discovery of the postcard increases their fears. Jenny returns at the end of the week. Her parents ask about her holiday, and allow her to dig a hole for herself as her fictitious account shows she is unaware of Mary's death and has clearly not spent the week in Blackpool. When confronted with the truth, Jenny admits to where she has been, and with whom, and defiantly refuses to be made to feel guilty or immoral.

The Hawthornes decide that they will have to confront the Jeffcotes with their son's unacceptable behaviour. Mrs. Hawthorne's anger is tempered by the fact that she believes the situation may be turned to financial advantage. Hawthorne feels some trepidation, as he and Jeffcote have been friends since childhood and have remained on good terms despite Jeffcote's rise to social prominence. To the surprise of the Hawthornes, Jeffcote agrees that in the circumstances Alan must be made to marry Jenny to prevent a scandal. Mrs. Jeffcote is less convinced, anticipating the ruin of Alan's reputation and business prospects. A meeting is convened between all the interested parties. Jenny and Alan remain silent while their parents try to thrash out suitable arrangements, and Mrs. Hawthorne and Mrs. Jeffcote become involved in an undignified shouting match. Jenny and Alan leave to talk alone. She tells him that she has no designs on his money and has no interest in marrying him. She then announces her decision to the incredulous parents, adding that Alan was no more to blame than she was, for both of them it was just a "little fling" about which neither need feel guilty, and that a woman has just as much right as a man to enjoy a brief sexual flirtation with no strings attached. Alan returns to his fiancée, while Jenny confidently leaves home and her mother's fury for an independent life without interference.

== Cast ==
- Belle Chrystall as Jenny Hawthorne
- John Stuart as Alan Jeffcote
- Norman McKinnel as Nathaniel Jeffcote
- Mary Clare as Mrs. Jeffcote
- Sybil Thorndike as Mrs. Hawthorne
- Edmund Gwenn as Chris Hawthorne
- A.G. Poulton as Sir Timothy Farrar
- Muriel Angelus as Beatrice Farrar
- Ruth Peterson as Mary Hollins
- John Longden as boyfriend

== Production ==
The film was shot at the Lime Grove Studios in Shepherd's Bush with sets designed by the art director Andrew Mazzei. Location shooting took place in Preston, Blackpool and North Wales.

Saville kept the plot faithful to its source material, making the film essentially a sound retread of the earlier silent versions, with only a small number of minor cosmetic adjustments; for example, the name of the lead character is changed from Fanny to Jenny, and the fatal accident here results from a bus crash rather than a drowning.

== Reception ==
Film Weekly wrote: "Victor Baville has handled the film with a sensitive touch and a feeling for drama. The straightforward methods he employs here are admirably suited to the simplicity of the story. Hindle Wakes is a British film to challenge America's best."

Kine Weekly wrote: "A modern screen adaptation of Stanley Houghton's famous play which, in mirroring life as it is lived in Lancashire without embellishment and trimmings, provides arresting and entertaining drama and is none the worse for not pointing a moral. The character delineation is exceptionally good, and every player represents a living type. The direction, too, shows experience and a keen sense of the dramatic, and results in the story, slight as it is, never losing its grip on the audience."
