= Two flats =

Two flats may refer to:

- B-flat major, a major musical key with two flats
- G minor, a minor musical key with two flats
- Symphony in Two Flats, a 1930 British drama
- Duplex (building), a house plan with two living units ("flats")
