= Kitty (novel) =

1927 novel by Warwick Deeping

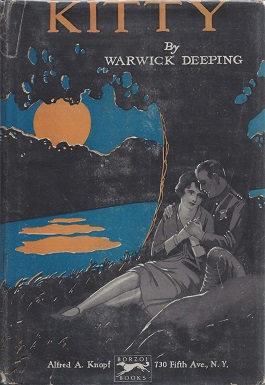
- First edition (US)
- Author: Warwick Deeping
- Language: English
- Publisher: Cassell (UK); Knopf (US)
- Publication date: 1927
- Publication place: United Kingdom
- Media type: Print

Kitty is a 1927 novel by the British writer Warwick Deeping. Like his earlier Sorrell and Son it was a bestseller.

== Adaptation ==
In 1929 it was turned into a film Kitty directed by Victor Saville. Shot partly as a silent and partly with sound it was one of the earliest British talkies to be released.

== Bibliography ==
- Mary Grover. The Ordeal of Warwick Deeping: Middlebrow Authorship and Cultural Embarrassment. Associated University Presse, 2009.
