= Sailors Don't Care =

Sailors Don't Care may refer to:

- Sailors Don't Care (1928 film), a British comedy film directed by W.P. Kellino
- Sailors Don't Care (1940 film), a British comedy film directed by Oswald Mitchell
