= You Know What Sailors Are =

You Know What Sailors Are may refer to:

- You Know What Sailors Are (1928 film), a 1928 British silent comedy drama film
- You Know What Sailors Are (1954 film), a 1954 British comedy film
