= The Stronger Sex =

1931 film by Gareth Gundrey

- Colin Clive in the film.
- Directed by: Gareth Gundrey
- Written by: J. Valentine (play); Gareth Gundrey
- Produced by: Michael Balcon
- Starring: Colin Clive; Adrianne Allen; Gordon Harker
- Cinematography: William Shenton
- Music by: Louis Levy
- Production company: Gainsborough Pictures
- Distributed by: Ideal Films
- Release date: 24 August 1931
- Running time: 85 minutes
- Country: United Kingdom
- Language: English

The Stronger Sex is a 1931 British drama film directed by Gareth Gundrey and starring Colin Clive, Adrianne Allen and Gordon Harker. It was written by Gundrey based on a play by J. Valentine, and made by Gainsborough Pictures at the company's Islington Studios in London.

== Synopsis ==
Warren Barrington is in debt, and marries wealthy colliery owner Mary Thorpe for her money. When he accidentally admits his motivation to her, they remain married, but only for appearance. Barrington tries to obtain Mary's forgiveness by working in the colliery, but when he finds out that she loves the mine's manager John Brent, his work becomes slip-shod and he causes a serious accident. When he joins the rescue effort he is entombed underground along with Brent. With only one respirator for the two men, Warren sacrifices himself so that Brent can live, for Mary's sake.

== Cast ==
- Colin Clive as Warren Barrington
- Adrianne Allen as Mary Thorpe
- Gordon Harker as Parker
- Martin Lewis as John Brent
- Renee Clama as Joan Merivale
- Elsa Lanchester as Thompson

== Production ==
Film Weekly reported: "The company went on location to Wolverhampton for the mining scenes. They occupied the Baggeridge Colliery, which was lent by the Earl of Dudley for the occasion. Scenes were taken at the pithead under the supervision of the general managers of the colliery. The miner's concert was given by men employed in this colliery who volunteered for the work."

== Reception ==
Kine Weekly wrote: "Artificial social drama, with interesting authentic colliery backgrounds and a thin story; somewhat lacking in life and strong human appeal. The characters are uninteresting and do not really elicit sympathy, while the direction is lacking in imagination and seldom succeeds in eliminating the obvious."

Film Weekly wrote: "Dramatic in story and effective in presentation, this British film, without being at all outstanding, is sound entertainment. ... Colin Clive is outstanding. It is his performance which gives The Stronger Sex much of its strength."

The Daily Film Renter wrote: "Rather uninspired and slow in development until pit disaster sequence, which is remarkably realistic piece of work, and worth waiting for. ... One of the best coal pit dramas seen on the talkie screen is marred by a rather silly introductory triangle drama, built on very conventional lines."
