= White Heat (1926 film) =

1926 film directed by Thomas Bentley

- Directed by: Thomas Bentley
- Written by: Eliot Stannard
- Starring: Juliette Compton; Wyndham Standing; George Bellamy; Vesta Sylva
- Production company: Graham-Wilcox Productions
- Distributed by: Graham-Wilcox Productions
- Release date: 1 September 1926
- Country: United Kingdom
- Language: English

White Heat is a 1926 British drama film directed by Thomas Bentley and starring Juliette Compton, Wyndham Standing and George Bellamy. The screenplay concerns a dancer who becomes romantically involved with a producer.

== Cast ==
- Juliette Compton – Helen
- Wyndham Standing – Gilbert Gillman
- Vesta Sylva – Eve Storer
- Walter Butler – Julian Jefferson
- Bertram Burleigh – Phil Storer
- George Bellamy – Mr. Storey
- Wellington Briggs – Hall
- Estelle Brody – Ninon
- Alf Goddard – Apache
