= Marie Ault =

British actress (1870–1951)

- Born: Emily Cragg; 2 September 1870; Wigan, Lancashire, England
- Died: 9 May 1951 (aged 80); Chelsea, London, England
- Years active: 1891-1951
- Spouse: James Alexander Paterson (m. 1893)

Marie Ault (2 September 1870 – 9 May 1951) was a British character actress of stage and film.

== Biography ==
Born Emily Cragg, in Wigan, Lancashire, the daughter of Jane Ann (née Ault) and Thomas Cragg, a plumber by trade. She made her first stage appearance in Babes in the Wood at Lincoln in 1891, touring the provinces for many years in various different productions. She made her debut on the London stage in 1906. Her later theatre work included the original production of Love on the Dole in 1935, as well as the 1941 film version. She married James Alexander Paterson in Dudley, Staffordshire in 1893.

Ault was a star in many British films of the silent era but is most remembered for her role as Daisy Bunting's mother in The Lodger: A Story of the London Fog (1927) directed by Alfred Hitchcock. She also played small but significant roles in three Ivor Norvello movies. The Rat, The Triumph Of The Rat and The Return Of The Rat released from 1925 to 1929.

Ault played characters of various nationalities, including Scottish, Irish, Italian, French, and English. In an interview with Pictures and the Picturegoer, Ault said her favorite role was the Amah from the play East of Suez. She wanted to play the role in the film version. However, the 1925 film cast Mrs. Wong Wing.

Other notable film work includes the role of Rummy Mitchens in the film of Bernard Shaw's Major Barbara (1941).

She also had bit parts in films such as Jamaica Inn (1939) and Caesar and Cleopatra (1945).

She died in a nursing home in Chelsea on 9 May 1951.

== Selected filmography ==
- Class and No Class (1921) - Liza Ann
- Wee MacGregor's Sweetheart (1922) - Miss Todd
- A Prince of Lovers (1922) - Nannie
- If Four Walls Told (1922) - Minor Role
- The Grass Orphan (1922) - Landlady
- Paddy the Next Best Thing (1923) - Mrs. Adair
- The Monkey's Paw (1923) - Mrs. White
- The Starlit Garden (1923) - Old Prue
- Woman to Woman (1923) - Henrietta
- The Colleen Bawn (1924) - Sheelah
- The Rat (1925) - Mere Colline
- The Prude's Fall (1925) - Mrs. Masters
- The Triumph of the Rat (1926) - Mère Colline / The Landlady
- The Lodger: A Story of the London Fog (1927) - The Landlady
- A Daughter in Revolt (1927) - Mrs. Dale
- Mademoiselle from Armentieres (1927) - Aunt
- Roses of Picardy (1927) - Baroness d'Archeville
- Madame Pompadour (1927) - Belotte
- Hindle Wakes (1927) - Mrs. Hawthorn
- The Rolling Road (1927) - Grannie
- The Silver Lining (1927) - Mrs. Hurst
- Dawn (1928) - Mme. Rappard
- Victory (1928) - Mother
- Virginia's Husband (1928) - Aunt Janet
- God's Clay (1928) - Hannah
- Yellow Stockings (1928) - Countess
- Life (1928) - Isidora
- Troublesome Wives (1928)
- Little Miss London (1929)
- The Alley Cat (1929) - Ma
- The Return of the Rat (1929) - Mère Colline
- Kitty (1929) - Sarah Greenwood
- Downstream (1929) - Martha Jaikes
- Third Time Lucky (1931) - Mrs. Midge
- The Speckled Band (1931) - Mrs. Hudson (uncredited)
- Contraband Love (1931) - Sarah Sterling
- Hobson's Choice (1931)
- Money for Speed (1933) - Ma
- Daughters of Today (1933) - Mrs. Tring
- Maid Happy (1933) - Miss Woods
- Their Night Out (1933) - Cook (uncredited)
- Little Fella (1933) - Mrs. Turner
- Song at Eventide (1934)
- Swinging the Lead (1934) - Mrs. Swid
- Windfall (1935) - Maggie Spooner
- Lend Me Your Wife (1935) - Aunt Jane
- Tropical Trouble (1936) - Nonnie
- Little Miss Somebody (1937) - Martha Gribble
- Owd Bob (1938) - Mrs. Sanderson (uncredited)
- Jamaica Inn (1939) - Coach Passenger (uncredited)
- Freedom Radio (1941) - Woman Customer
- You Will Remember (1941) - Minor Role (uncredited)
- Major Barbara (1941) - Rummy Mitchens
- Love on the Dole (1941) - Mrs. Jike
- The Missing Million (1942) - Mrs. Tweedle
- We Dive at Dawn (1943) - Mrs. Metcalfe (uncredited)
- The Demi-Paradise (1943) - Mrs. Jones (uncredited)
- It Happened One Sunday (1944) - Madame
- Twilight Hour (1945) - Liz (uncredited)
- Blithe Spirit (1945) - Cook (uncredited)
- The Man from Morocco (1945) - Hotelière
- Waltz Time (1945) - Cenci's Maid
- Caesar and Cleopatra (1945) - Egyptian Lady (uncredited)
- They Knew Mr. Knight (1946) - Grandma Blake
- Wanted for Murder (1946) - Flower Seller (uncredited)
- I See a Dark Stranger (1946) - Mrs. O'Mara
- Carnival (1946) - Mrs. Dale
- Blanche Fury (1948) - Old Gypsy
- The Three Weird Sisters (1948) - Beattie
- No Room at the Inn (1948) - Vicar's Maid (uncredited)
- Madness of the Heart (1949) - Nun
- Cheer the Brave (1951) - Mother-in-Law (final film role)
