= The Wickham Mystery =

1931 film

- Theatrical release poster
- Directed by: G.B. Samuelson
- Story by: John McNally
- Produced by: E. Gordon Craig
- Starring: Eve Gray; John Longden; Lester Matthews
- Production company: Majestic Film Company
- Distributed by: United Artists
- Release date: 19 October 1931
- Running time: 83 minutes
- Country: United Kingdom
- Language: English

The Wickham Mystery is a 1931 British mystery film directed by G. B. Samuelson and starring Eve Gray, John Longden and Lester Matthews. It was based on a play by John McNally. It was shot at Isleworth Studios in London and distributed by United Artists.

== Cast ==
- Eve Gray as Joan Hamilton
- John Longden as Harry Crawford
- Lester Matthews as Charles Wickham
- Wallace Bosco as Edward Hamilton
- Sam Livesey as Inspector Cobb
- John Turnbull as Howard Clayton
- Doris Clemence as Mrs Wickham
- Walter Piers as George Beverley

== Reception ==
The Daily Film Renter wrote: "Crude quota offering. Story values quite good, but acting and dialogue amateurish, and some of the incident belongs to prewar silent days. Humorous relief fair where intentional, excellent where unrehearsed. For indulgent audiences. This Samuelson production is in many ways a typical example of the less ambitious type of British film, in which the ship of story is spoiled by the fact that the tar of treatment has had rather less than the conventional ha'porth of attention."

Picture Show wrote: "Slow development, uninspired acting, although the matefial considerable handicaps the players, and mediocre direction."

Picturegoer wrote: "It is a pity that quite an ingenious mystery crook story has been presented in a manner which fails to do its ingenuity justice. The dialogue is banal and the acting, generally speaking, is not a strong point. The exceptions are Eve Gray, as the heroine, and Walter Piers, as a man who poses as a 'silly ass' to gain his ends."

Film Weekly wrote: "About the only thing that is consistent in this so-called 'mystery melodrama' is the recording, and as filmgoers accept this technicality to be as a matter of course there is really nothing to recommend. The story of a struggle for a valuable helicopter is a poor one at the start, and its mediocrity is not helped by disjointed development, undistinguished direction, and indifferent acting. Even an attempt to sketch in comedy relief is ineffective, while the climax is absurdly melodramatic. Altogether, the film gets lost in its own obscurity. Poor stuff."
