= Estelle Brody =

American actress (1900–1995)

- Promotional photograph
- Born: 15 August 1900; New York City, U.S.
- Died: 3 June 1995 (aged 94); Valletta, Malta
- Occupation: Actress
- Years active: 1926 – 1980
- Spouse: Robert Fenn
- Father: Joseph Brody

Estelle Brody (15 August 1900 – 3 June 1995) was an American actress who became one of the biggest female stars of British silent film in the latter half of the 1920s. Her career was then derailed by a series of ill-advised decisions and she disappeared from sight for many years before re-emerging between the late 1940s and the 1960s in smaller supporting film and television roles.

== Early life ==
Brody was born in New York City, and began her career as a dancer in vaudeville. Her father Joseph Brody was a composer of Jewish music who had been born in Russia.

After working for some time as part of a touring troupe travelling round the U.S., she moved to England in the 1920s, finding work in West End theatres.

== Stardom in Britain ==
Although Brody had no previous acting experience, her vivaciousness was spotted by film director Thomas Bentley, who offered her a supporting role in his 1926 film White Heat. She then immediately landed the lead role for Maurice Elvey in Mademoiselle from Armentieres, set in France during World War I. This turned out to be a huge popular success, running in British cinemas for several months and becoming reportedly the highest-grossing British-made film of 1926. To Brody's great surprise, she found herself acclaimed as a new star by the British media. At the time there was a general feeling, both from critics and audiences, of dissatisfaction with what was seen as excessive American influence on British film-making. To pre-empt this, publicity material falsely claimed Brody to be a Canadian citizen. This was accepted as fact, and the misapprehension would persist throughout her career.

Brody spent the remainder of the 1920s starring in a number of high-profile productions which earned her critical and popular acclaim as a natural in front of the camera. Reflecting on this period in later life, Brody commented: "Apparently my work went over well. Beyond my wildest dreams". Her most enduring performance is generally considered to be in 1927's Hindle Wakes, again for Elvey. This was the second silent version of the famous, and controversial in its time, stage play by Stanley Houghton, and received an appropriate budget for a prestige production. Extensive location filming took place in Manchester and Blackpool, giving the film a documentary realism feel very unusual in British silent cinema, which is now regarded as a valuable socio-historical portrait of 1920s Lancashire.

In 1929, Brody had just finished work on the silent film Kitty, when director Victor Saville decided to reshoot the second half of the film with sound. As the British studio lacked the necessary facilities, Brody and co-star John Stuart were despatched to New York where the scenes were shot at RKO Studios, with Brody in the odd situation of being in the city of her birth but having to disguise her native accent in order to sound like a London girl.

In the late 1920s, Brody met aspiring army soldier Ray Milland and played a decisive role in his decision to pursue an acting career instead.

== Career decline and later life ==
Returning from New York, Brody found the British film industry in a state of flux and uncertainty on the cusp of the transition from silents to talkies. Her voice was not considered desirable by British producers at the time, which heightened her anxiety about the situation. When no new film offers were immediately forthcoming, she made the decision to try her luck in Hollywood. She later acknowledged that this had been a major mistake; not only did she at a stroke alienate a large number of her British fans who accused her of betrayal, but once in Hollywood she found that her status in Britain counted for nothing with American directors. The few offers made were not the kind of roles she wished to play, and ultimately she would only appear as support in two films in which her characters were billed as "Girl from Kokomo" and "Prisoner".

Disillusioned with her Hollywood experiences, Brody returned to England in the mid-1930s but did not seek to resurrect her British career. She married Robert Fenn, an agent representing actors and film composers, and settled into private life out of the spotlight. She finally returned to the screen in 1949 with a minor role in I Was a Male War Bride and for the next decade made sporadic film appearances, with her last film credit coming in Never Take Sweets from a Stranger in 1960. She also appeared occasionally in TV productions in the 1950s and early 1960s.

In 1969, Brody and Fenn relocated to Malta, where they spent the remainder of their lives. Brody died in Valletta on 3 June 1995, aged 94.

== Filmography ==
Year	Title	Role	Notes
1926	Mademoiselle from Armentieres	Mademoiselle	Lost film
1926	White Heat	Ninon	
1927	The Glad Eye	Kiki	
1927	Hindle Wakes	Fanny Hawthorn	
1927	The Flight Commander	Mary	
1927	The Marriage Business	Annette	
1928	Sailors Don't Care	Jenny Melrose	
1928	Mademoiselle Parley Voo	Mademoiselle	
1929	Weekend Wives	Madame le Grand	
1929	Kitty	Kitty Greenwood	
1929	The Plaything	Joyce Bennett	
1931	A Broadway Romeo	Girl from Kokomo	
1933	Ann Vickers	Prisoner	Uncredited
1949	I Was a Male War Bride	WAC Announcer Officer	Uncredited
1950	They Were Not Divided	War Correspondent	
1950	Lilli Marlene	Estelle	
1953	Finishing School	Mrs. Whitmore	
1956	Safari	Aunty May	
1957	The Story of Esther Costello	Tammy	
1959	Breakout	Maureen O'Quinn	
1960	Never Take Sweets from a Stranger	Eunice Kalliduke	

== See also ==
- Cinema of the United States
- American silent film actresses
- American film actresses
- American silent films
- British silent films
- British silent film actresses
