= Three Sundays to Live =

1957 British film by Ernest Morris

- British campaign book cover
- Directed by: Ernest Morris
- Written by: Brian Clemens
- Produced by: Edward J. Danziger; Harry Lee Danziger
- Starring: Kieron Moore; Jane Griffiths
- Cinematography: James Wilson
- Edited by: Sidney Stone
- Music by: Edwin Astley; Albert Elms
- Production company: Danziger Productions
- Distributed by: United Artists Corporation (UK)
- Release date: 1957
- Running time: 71 minutes
- Country: United Kingdom
- Language: English

Three Sundays to Live is a low budget 1957 second feature ('B') film noir British film directed by Ernest Morris and starring Kieron Moore and Jane Griffiths. It was written by Brian Clemens and produced by The Danzigers.

The title refers to the law of the period, which required that after a death sentence had been passed, three Sundays must elapse before the execution.

== Plot ==
Young dance band leader, Frank Martin, is condemned to death for a murder he did not commit. Desperate to prove his innocence, Frank escapes from jail and, with his girlfriend Judy, embarks upon the search for a blonde singer who was used to frame him for the killing. Using a contact who owes Frank a favour, they trace the singer, but the real killer shoots her through a window after she agrees to help them. However, Martin manages to trick the murderer into believing he has killed the wrong woman. When the killer returns to try again, Frank is waiting.

== Cast ==
- Kieron Moore as Frank Martin
- Jane Griffiths as Judy Allen
- Basil Dignam as Davitt
- Sandra Dorne as Ruth Chapman
- Harold Ayer as Al Murray
- John Stone as detective
- Norman Mitchell as police sergeant
- John Longden as warder
- Ferdy Mayne as Davis
- John Stuart as the judge (uncredited)
- Bill Fraser as prison warder (uncredited)
- George Roderick as second officer (uncredited)

== Reception ==
The Monthly Film Bulletin wrote: "This sad and stereotyped crime story has no redeeming feature. The situations are implausible, the treatment sluggish, the acting unpersuasive. It is particularly unflattering to Scotland Yard, whose detectives, apparently, are quite incapable of recognising a blatant frame-up."

Kine Weekly wrote: "The players work hard, but uneven direction prevents them from ironing typical quota earmarks out of its script. ... The picture tries to thrill at the expense of the Law, but fails. Kieron Moore leaves nothing to chance as Frank, Jane Griffiths meets emotional demands as Judy, and Basil Dignam puts on a bold front as the well-meaning if unethical Davitt, but its conscientious cast is wasted on cheap pulp fiction. It'll leave the majority cold and incredulous."

Picturegoer wrote: "The strain on the onlooker's credulity reaches breaking point some time before the end. Ropey, to say the least."

The Daily Film Renter wrote: "Economically made, this product tells its story straightforwardly and keeps the pace moving so that it holds the attention. Performances are reasonably convincing throughout, if at times, the circumstances seem unlikely! A useful and reliable booking for program-building in not-too-sophisticated situations."

Chibnall and McFarlane wrote that the film "makes good use of varied settings. ... The courtroom scene is quite inventively done with music and dissolves from face to face but no spoken words."

In British Sound Films: The Studio Years 1928–1959 David Quinlan rated the film as "poor", calling it "dreary and ridiculous."
