= Gaetano di Ventimiglia =

Italian cinematographer

Baron Gaetano Ventimiglia (1888–1973) was an Italian cinematographer who worked in the Italian and British film industries during the silent era. di Ventimiglia collaborated three times with Alfred Hitchcock. He was a descendant of the House of Ventimiglia.

== Selected filmography ==
- Theodora, the Slave Princess (1921)
- The Pleasure Garden (1925)
- Venetian Lovers (1925)
- The City of Temptation (1925)
- The Mountain Eagle (1926)
- The Lodger (1927)
- A Woman in Pawn (1927)
- The Physician (1928)
- Sailors Don't Care (1928)
- Smashing Through (1929)

== Bibliography ==
- Mcgilligan, Patrick. Alfred Hitchcock: A Life in Darkness and Light. HarperCollins, 2004.
- Gottlieb, Sidney & Brookhouse, Christopher. Framing Hitchcock: Selected Essays from the Hitchock Annual. Wayne State University Press, 2002.
