= The Arcadians (film) =

1927 British film by Victor Saville

- Directed by: Victor Saville
- Written by: Mark Ambient (play); Alex Thompson (play); Victor Saville
- Produced by: Maurice Elvey; Gareth Gundrey; Victor Saville
- Starring: Ben Blue; Jeanne de Casalis; Vesta Sylva; John Longden
- Production company: Gaumont British Picture Corporation
- Distributed by: Gaumont British Distributors
- Release date: November 1927
- Running time: 84 minutes
- Country: United Kingdom
- Language: English

The Arcadians is a 1927 British comedy film directed by Victor Saville (his directorial debut), and starring Ben Blue, Jeanne de Casalis and Vesta Sylva. It is a silent adaptation of the musical The Arcadians. It is on the BFI 75 Most Wanted list of missing films, but the British Film Institute has reported that an "incomplete and deteriorating nitrate print ... was apparently viewed prior to July 2008". It was made at the Lime Grove Studios in Shepherd's Bush.

== Cast ==
- Ben Blue as Simplicitas Smith
- Jeanne de Casalis as Mrs. Smith
- Vesta Sylva as Eileen Cavanaugh
- John Longden as Jack Meadows
- Gibb McLaughlin as Peter Doody
- Humberston Wright as Sir George Paddock
- Cyril McLaglen as The Crook
- Doris Bransgrove as Sombra
- Nancy Rigg as Chrysea
- Phyllis Calvert as Young girl

== Bibliography ==
- Low, Rachael. History of the British Film, 1918-1929. George Allen & Unwin, 1971.
