= Humberston Wright =

British actor (1876–1953)

- Born: 27 September 1876; London, United Kingdom
- Died: 1953 (aged 76–77); Babbacombe, Devon, United Kingdom
- Other names: Humberstone Wright, Humberston H. Wright,
- Occupation: Actor
- Years active: 1916–1953 (film)

Humberston Wright (27 September 1876 – 1953), sometimes credited as Humberstone Wright or Humberston H. Wright, was a British film actor.

== Filmography ==
- Trapped by the London Sharks (1916)
- Thelma (1918)
- The Secret Woman (1918)
- The Romance of Lady Hamilton (1919)
- The Rocks of Valpre (1919)
- The Double Life of Mr. Alfred Burton (1919)
- God's Clay (1919)
- The Garden of Resurrection (1919)
- The Little Welsh Girl (1920)
- Walls of Prejudice (1920)
- The Way of the World (1920)
- Uncle Dick's Darling (1920)
- The English Rose (1920)
- The Fifth Form at St. Dominic's (1921)
- The Glorious Adventure (1922)
- The Peacemaker (1922)
- A Sporting Double (1922)
- Creation (1922)
- Fu Manchu (1923)
- The Sign of Four (1923)
- Sally Bishop (1924)
- In the Blood (1923)
- Henry, King of Navarre (1924)
- Slaves of Destiny (1924)
- The Gay Corinthian (1924)
- The Love Story of Aliette Brunton (1924)
- The Squire of Long Hadley (1925)
- The Flag Lieutenant (1926)
- London Love (1926)
- Safety First (1926)
- Mademoiselle from Armentieres (1926)
- Hindle Wakes (1927)
- Roses of Picardy (1927)
- A Sister to Assist 'Er (1927)
- The Flight Commander (1927)
- The Arcadians (1927)
- The Glad Eye (1927)
- The Physician (1928)
- Boadicea (1928)
- What Money Can Buy (1928)
- Mademoiselle Parley Voo (1928)
- Sailors Don't Care (1928)
- Master and Man (1929)
- High Treason (1929)
- Waterloo (1929)
- White Cargo (1929)
- Alf's Button (1930)
- Down River (1931)
- The Marriage Bond (1932)
- Lloyd of the C.I.D. (1932)
- Congress Dances (1932)
- In a Monastery Garden (1932)
- Commissionaire (1933)
- The House of Trent (1933)
- Strictly Illegal (1935)
- Young and Innocent (1937)
- Escape Dangerous (1947)
