= John Stuart (actor) =

Scottish actor (1898–1979)

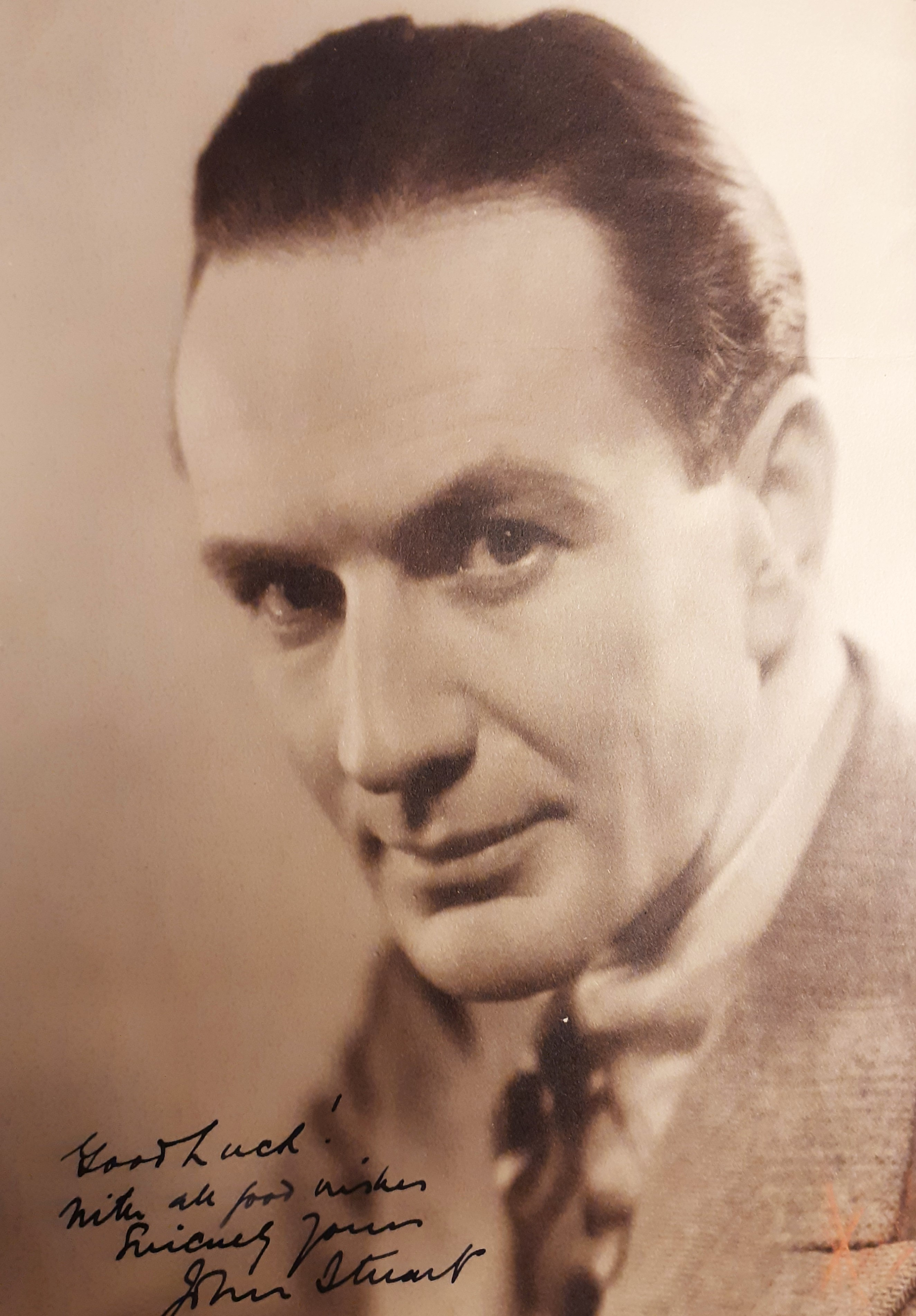
- Autographed publicity photo from 1934
- Born: John Alfred Louden Croall; 18 July 1898; Edinburgh, Midlothian, Scotland
- Died: 17 October 1979 (aged 81); London, England
- Occupation: Actor
- Years active: 1920–1979
- Spouse(s): Jeanne Irene V. Lagrene (m. 1924–?); Muriel E S M Findlay (m. 1933–1940); Eunice Barbara Francis (m. 1943–1979)

John Stuart (John Alfred Louden Croall; 18 July 1898 – 17 October 1979) was a Scottish actor, and was a very popular leading man in British silent films in the 1920s. He successfully made the transition to talking pictures in the 1930s and his film career went on to span almost six decades. He appeared in 172 films (including shorts), 123 stage plays, and 103 television plays and series.

== Early life ==
John Croall – later John Stuart – was born in Edinburgh on 18 July 1898. He came from a wealthy family whose company John Croall & Sons, run by his grandfather, made chassis for luxury cars such as Rolls-Royce. When he was seven the family moved to London, living in a house in Hampstead. His parents separated the following year, and John lived with his mother and two brothers in St John's Wood. He attended Dunstable Grammar School as a boarder, and at thirteen moved to Eastbourne College: 'Scholastically I was pretty hopeless. I loved games, particularly rugger and fives'. An early ambition was to become a naval doctor, but he then decided to join the army. Initially rejected because he was under age, at nineteen he was accepted and joined the Black Watch regiment as a private. He was then posted as a Second Lieutenant in the 2nd Battalion of the Seaforth Highlanders, with which he saw active service in the Arras sector of the Western Front. He was invalided out with trench fever in September 1918, and hospitalised in London, being released on Armistice Day. Whilst waiting in Scotland to be demobilised he became the battalion’s entertainment officer, organising concert parties for charity.

== Breaking into films ==
After a brief spell working in the family firm’s London office, against his family’s wishes he decided to try a career as an actor, using the stage name John Stuart. Despite having no acting training, he made his stage debut as an extra in a 1919 production of The Trojan Women at the Old Vic theatre, then appeared as the juvenile lead in a six-month tour of The Chinese Puzzle. The film producer and director Walter West, who thought he had ‘a film face’, asked him to play a small role in his 1920 silent film Her Son, for which he was paid three guineas a day. The film was shot at Broadwest Company's studio in Walthamstow. This led to him being cast that year in two other films for West The Great Gay Road and The Lights of Home, after which he decided to concentrate on a film career. He was then cast as the famous Welsh violinist David Morgan, the lead role in Land of My Fathers. Having received good notices, he went on in 1922 to play the romantic lead in Sinister Street, A Sporting Double and If Four Walls Told, while 1923 found him appearing in This Freedom, The School for Scandal and The Loves of Mary, Queen of Scots. During a slump in the British film industry he returned to the stage, making his debut in the West End as Lord Bleane in Our Betters, Somerset Maugham's withering attack on contemporary society, which ran for 548 performances. During this period he worked in the film studios during the day and at the theatre in the evenings.

== A star of the silent screen ==
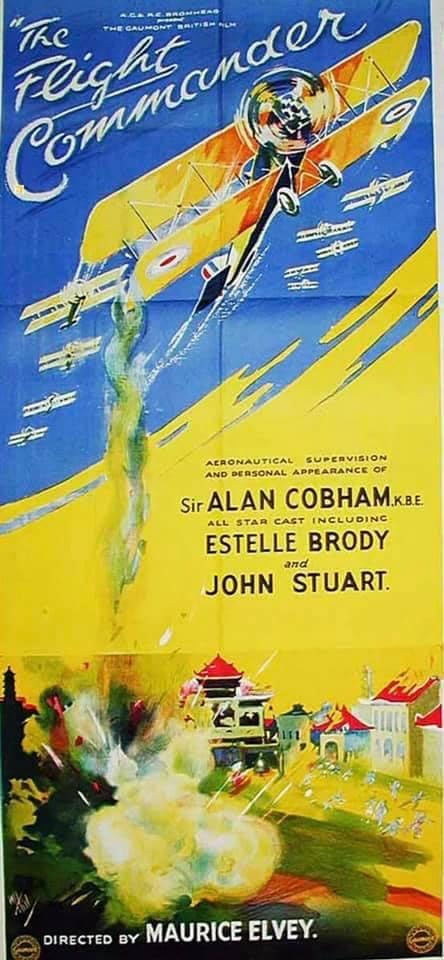
Poster for 'The Flight Commander', 1927

In 1924 he married Jeanne Lagrene, a young French woman from Amiens. During the 1920s he starred in 35 silent feature films (and 20 short films) most of which are now lost. Two of his better-known films from this period were Alfred Hitchcock's debut as a director The Pleasure Garden (1925) and Hindle Wakes (1927), directed by Maurice Elvey from Stanley Houghton’s controversial play.

He became especially popular among cinema-goers with three war films directed by Elvey: Mademoiselle from Armentieres (1926) and The Flight Commander (1927) in which he played opposite the American actress Estelle Brody, and Roses of Picardy, where his co-star was Lilian Hall-Davis. These films were widely praised, with the Daily Chronicle stating that 'John Stuart is easily the best leading man in British pictures.' His popularity was such that a fan club, named the John Stuart Friendship Club, was set up in 1927 and attracted a large number of members. But his fame came at a price, for he was frequently mobbed by female fans. When he opened the new Clapham Pavilion cinema, he had to be given police protection from cheering fans. After visiting the Film Artists Fair in Bloomsbury he was surrounded by two hundred screaming young women, who clasped him around the neck and seized his arms. 'My hat, handkerchief and tie were snatched away, my pockets ripped off and my coat torn, all apparently for souvenirs' he explained the next morning.'

== The talkies ==
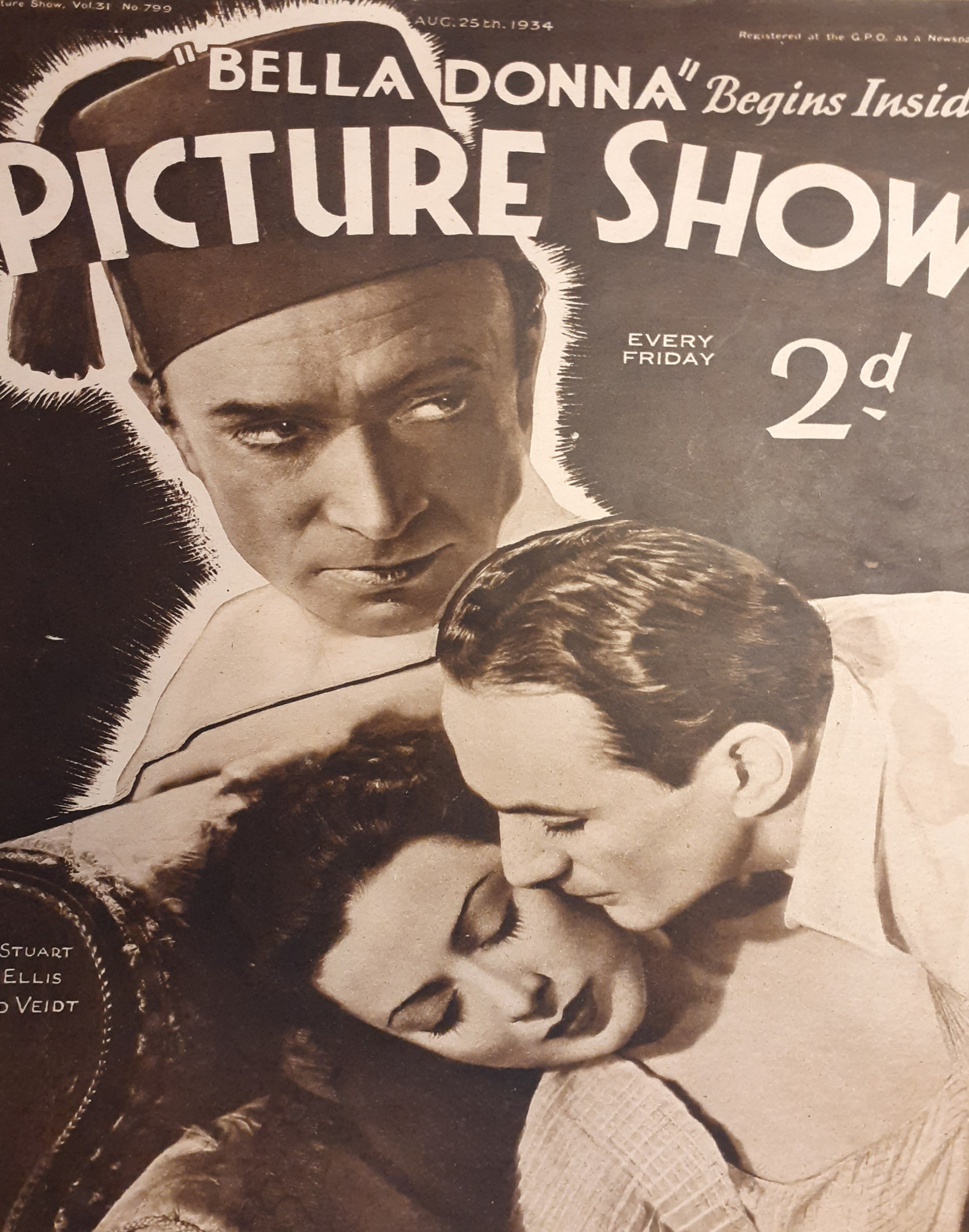
Cover of 'Picture Show' magazine 25 August 1934 featuring 'Bella Donna' and showing Conrad Veidt (top), Mary Ellis and John Stuart

In 1929 he and Estelle Brody were reunited in Kitty, directed by Victor Saville – one of the first British 'talkies'. The film featured a synchronised music score with sound effects and sequences of dialogue, recorded in New York as sound recording equipment wasn't available in Britain. Unlike several silent stars he made an easy transition to talking pictures. Now divorced from his first wife, in 1928 he met Muriel Angelus (born Muriel Findlay to Scottish parents in London) on the set of Sailors Don't Care. In 1931 she was cast as his fiancée in the sound re-make of Hindle Wakes, and in 1933 they were married.

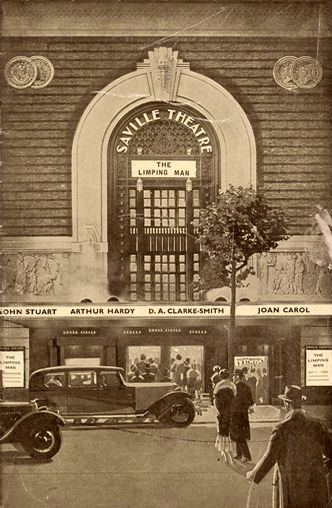
Illustration from theatre programme of 1936 based on a photo of the Saville Theatre, featuring the play 'The Limping Man'

In 1932 he played three contrasting roles: he had the lead as a detective in his second film directed by Alfred Hitchcock, the thriller Number Seventeen (some sources erroneously claim he also has an uncredited role in Elstree Calling, co-directed by Hitchcock); he was an aggressive and ambitious foreman in a steel works in Men of Steel, which also featured Franklin Dyall, Benita Hume and Heather Angel; and he starred as the soldier hero who succumbs to the charms of Brigitte Helm in L'Atlantide (also known as 'The Mistress of Atlantis'), directed by the eminent G. W. Pabst, who shot many scenes in the Sahara desert. In Bella Donna (1934) he impressed as Mary Ellis's idealistic and deluded husband, matched well with co-star Conrad Veidt. He also played in two films starring Gracie Fields: as her teacher in This Week of Grace (1933), and as her fiancé in The Show Goes On (1937).

Around this time he started to work more in the theatre. As well as such West End productions as Finished Abroad in 1934 (Savoy), and in 1935 Public Saviour No.1 (Piccadilly), Butterfly on the Wheel (Playhouse) and The Limping Man (Saville), he toured with No Exit (1936) and What We All Want (1937). In 1938 and 1939 he led a repertory company in two seasons at the Sunderland Empire. Meanwhile Muriel Angelus had been a success in the stage musical Balalaika in the West End, and was offered a Hollywood contract with Paramount Studios. The couple separated when she moved to America.

== The second world war ==
At the outbreak of war he attempted to rejoin his old regiment, but was deemed unfit on account of his previous disease, trench fever. In spring 1940 he undertook another repertory season in Sunderland, this time at the King’s theatre. Back in films, he appeared in two low-budget comedy films with Arthur Lucan and Kitty McShane: Old Mother Riley in Society (1940) and Old Mother Riley's Ghosts (1941), and starred with Wilfred Lawson and Betty Stockfeld in Hard Steel (1942) as a romantic poet and composer. He had smaller roles in propaganda films about the war, including Michael Balcon's Ships with Wings (1941), a tribute to the Fleet Air Arm, starring Leslie Banks, Ann Todd and John Clements; the drama-documentary The Big Blockade (1941), in which many stars played cameo parts; and Flying Fortress (1942), about the arrival of American airmen in Britain. But substantial parts continued: he was convincing as the cynical newspaper editor married to Anne Crawford in the thriller Headline (1943), and as the sympathetic husband of Phyllis Calvert in the Gainsborough melodrama Madonna of the Seven Moons (1945). He continued working in the theatre throughout this time. Having been divorced from Muriel Angelus, in 1943 he married the actress Barbara Francis, who had been his leading lady at Sunderland. They had two sons, Jonathan and Stephen, both born during the war.

== Later work ==
His professionalism and reliability was such that throughout the 1950s he worked constantly, playing minor roles as middle-class professionals such as doctors, police inspectors, detectives, a bank manager, a coroner and a magistrate. He also appeared in three films for Hammer Studios, The Revenge of Frankenstein (1958), Blood of the Vampire (1958) and The Mummy, and featured in two acclaimed comedies, The Naked Truth (1957) and Too Many Crooks (1959).

In the aftermath of television resuming after the war, he acted in Murder in the Cathedral (1947), R.U.R. (1948), Ten Little Niggers (1949), Time and the Conways (1950), and The Railway Children (1951). His many subsequent television roles included appearances in Billy Bunter of Greyfriars School (1952–4), The Railway Children (again,1957-8), the children's science-fiction series The Lost Planet (1954-5), and the popular hospital drama Emergency Ward 10 (1959). Meanwhile in the cinema he played Captain Kerr of H.M.S Hood in Lewis Gilbert’s epic film Sink the Bismarck! (1960), while in the theatre he was cast as Group Captain Wood in Terence Rattigan’s play Ross (Haymarket and tour, 1960), the story of Lawrence of Arabia. In the 1960s he mainly worked in television, but the 1970s brought interesting film appearances in Young Winston (1972) and Superman (1978). He died on 17 October 1979, his acting career having lasted almost sixty years.

== Legacy ==
Publicity photograph, date unknown

His short memoir Caught in the Act was published by The Silent Picture (1971). His son, Jonathan Croall, has written three books about his father: John Stuart: Portrait of an Actor (Blurb Books, 2011); Forgotten Stars: My Father and the British Silent Film World (Fantom, 2013); and From Silent Film Idol to Superman: The Life and Career of John Stuart (McFarland, 2023). The latter includes much previously unpublished personal and professional information. His son has also written two newspaper articles: 'My father, the silent film star' in The Stage, and 'My dad, the silent film star' in The Guardian.

== Filmography ==
This filmography includes feature films only and draws from Jonathan Croall's From Silent Film Idol to Superman: The Life and Career of John Stuart (McFarland, 2023).

- Her Son (1920) as Min Gascoyne
- The Great Gay Road (1920) as Rodney Foster
- The Lights of Home (1920) as Philip Compton
- Land of My Fathers (1921) as David Morgan
- Sinister Street (1922) as Michael Fane
- The Little Mother (1922) as Jack
- A Sporting Double (1922) as Will Blunt
- If Four Walls Told (1922) as Cuthbert
- The Extra Knot (1922) as Teddy Blythe
- This Freedom (1923) as Huggo Occleve
- The Mistletoe Bough (1923) as Lord Lovell
- Little Miss Nobody (1923) as Cheviot
- The School for Scandal (1923) as Charles Surface
- The Loves of Mary, Queen of Scots (1923) as George Douglas
- His Grace Gives Notice (1924) as Joseph Longley
- The Alley of Golden Hearts (1924) as Jack
- Her Redemption (1924) as Jack Latimer
- We Women (1925) as Michael Rivven
- A Daughter of Love (1925) as Dudley Bellairs
- Venetian Lovers (1925) as Bob Goring
- Bachelor Wives (1925) as Leopold Finaisen
- The Pleasure Garden (1925) as Hugh Fielding
- London Love (1926) as Harry Raymond
- Mademoiselle from Armentieres (1926) as Johnny
- Roses of Picardy (1927) as Lieutenant Skene
- The Glad Eye (1927) as Maurice
- Hindle Wakes (1927) as Allan Jeffcote
- The Flight Commander (1927) as John Massey
- A Woman in Pawn (1927) as James Rawdon
- Sailors Don't Care (1928) as Slinger Woods
- Mademoiselle Parley Voo (1928) as John
- Yacht of the Seven Sins (1928) as Kilian Gurlitt
- Smashing Through (1929) as Richard Bristol
- High Seas (1929) as Tiny Bracklethorpe
- Kitty (1929) as Alex St. George
- Taxi for Two (1929) as Jack Devenish
- Atlantic (1929) as Lawrence
- aka The Brat (1930) as Max Nicholson
- No Exit (1930) as Bill Alden
- Kissing Cup's Race (1930) as Lord Jimmy Hilhoxton
- Children of Chance (1930) as Gordon
- Hindle Wakes (1931) as Alan Jeffcote
- The Hound of the Baskervilles (1931) as Sir Henry Baskerville
- In a Monastery Garden (1932) as Michael Ferrier
- Verdict of the Sea (1932) as Gentleman Burton
- Number Seventeen (1932) as Detective Barton
- Men of Steel (1932) as James 'Iron' Harg
- Little Fella (1932) as Major Tony Griffiths
- The Mistress of Atlantis (1932) as Lt. Saint-Avit
- The Lost Chord (1933) as David Graham
- This Week of Grace (1933) as Henry Baring
- Head of the Family (1933) as Bill Stanmore
- Mayfair Girl (1933) as Robert Blair
- Home, Sweet Home (1933) as Richard Pelham
- Enemy of the Police (1933) as John Meakin
- The Wandering Jew (1933) as Pietro Morelli
- The House of Trent (1933) as John Trent
- The Pointing Finger (1933) as Lord Rollestone
- Naughty Cinderella (1933) as Michael Wynard
- Mr. Quincey of Monte Carlo (1933) as Mr. Quincey
- Love's Old Sweet Song (1933) as Paul Kingslake
- Bella Donna (1934) as Nigel Armine
- The Black Abbot (1934) as Frank Brooks
- The Four Masked Men (1934) as Trevor Phillips
- Grand Prix (1934) as Jack Holford
- The Blue Squadron (1934) as Colonel Mario Spada
- The Green Pack (1934) as Larry Dean
- Blind Justice (1934) as John Summers
- D'Ye Ken John Peel? (1935) as Captain Moonlight / Captain Freeman
- Royal Cavalcade (1935) as Explorer in Tent
- Lend Me Your Husband (1935) as Jeff Green
- Once a Thief (1935) as Roger Drummond
- Abdul the Damned (1935) as Capt. Talak-Bey
- The Secret Voice (1936) as Jim Knowles
- Reasonable Doubt (1936) as Noel Hampton
- The Elder Brother (1937) as Ronald Bellairs
- Pearls Bring Tears (1937) as Harry Willshire
- The Show Goes On (1937) as Mack McDonald
- Talking Feet (1937) as Dr. Roger Hood
- The Claydon Treasure Mystery (1938) as Peter Kerrigan
- Old Mother Riley in Society (1940) as Tony Morgan
- The Big Blockade (1940) as Naval Officer
- Old Mother Riley's Ghosts (1941) as John Cartwright
- Ships with Wings (1941) as Commodore Hood
- The Seventh Survivor (1941) as Robert Cooper
- Penn of Pennsylvania (1942) as Bindle
- The Missing Million (1942) as Inspector Dicker
- Banana Ridge (1942) as Chief Police Officer Staples
- Hard Steel (1942) as Alan Saunders
- Flying Fortress (1942) as Captain Harvey (uncredited)
- Women Aren't Angels (1943) as Major Gaunt
- Headline (1944) as L.B. Ellington
- Candles at Nine (1944) as William Gardener
- Madonna of the Seven Moons (1945) as Giuseppe Labardi
- The Phantom Shot (1947) as Inspector Webb
- Mine Own Executioner (1947) as Dr. John Hayling
- Mrs. Fitzherbert (1947) as Duke of Bedford
- House of Darkness (1948) as Crabtree
- Escape from Broadmoor (1948) as Inspector Thornton
- Third Time Lucky (1948) as Inspector
- The Temptress (1949) as Sir Charles Clifford
- The Man from Yesterday (1949) as Gerald Amersley
- Man on the Run (1949) as Detective-Inspector Jim McBane
- The Magic Box (1951) as 2nd Platform Man
- Mr. Denning Drives North (1952) as Wilson
- The Ringer (1952) as Gardener
- Mantrap (A.K.A. Man in Hiding) (1953) as Doctor
- Street Corner (1953) as Magistrate
- Four Sided Triangle (1953) as Solicitor
- Front Page Story (1954) as Counsel for the Prosecution
- The Men of Sherwood Forest (1954) as Moraine
- The Gilded Cage (1955) as Harding
- John and Julie (1955) as Palace Policeman
- Alias John Preston (1955) as Dr. Underwood
- It's a Great Day (1955) as Detective Inspector Marker
- Tons of Trouble (1956) as Doctor
- Johnny, You're Wanted (1956) as Surgeon
- Raiders of the River (1956) as Mr. Hampton
- The Last Man to Hang (1956) as Magistrate
- Eyewitness (1956) as Chief Constable
- Five Clues to Fortune (1957) as Abbot
- Quatermass II (1957) as Commissioner
- The Naked Truth (1957) as Police Inspector
- The Betrayal (1957) as War Crimes Commissioner
- Three Sundays to Live (1957) as The Judge (uncredited)
- The Revenge of Frankenstein (1958) as Inspector
- Blood of the Vampire (1958) as Uncle Phillippe
- Chain of Events (1958) as Bank Manager
- Further Up the Creek (1958) as Admiral
- The Secret Man (1959) as Dr. Warren
- Idol on Parade (1959) as Doctor
- Too Many Crooks (1959) as Inspector Jensen
- The Mummy (1959) as Coroner
- Sink the Bismarck! (1960) as Captain Ralph Kerr (of the Hood)
- Bottoms Up (1960) as Police Officer
- Village of the Damned (1960) as Professor Smith
- Compelled (1960) as Book man
- Pit of Darkness (1961) as Lord Barnsford (uncredited)
- Danger by My Side (1962) as Prison Governor
- Paranoiac (1963) as Williams
- The Scarlet Blade (1964) as Beverley (uncredited)
- Young Winston (1972) as Viscount Peel, Speaker of the House of Commons
- Royal Flash (1975) as English General
- Superman (1978) as 10th Elder on Krypton Council
