= Mixed Doubles (1933 film) =

- Directed by: Sidney Morgan
- Written by: Joan Morgan; Frank Stayton (play)
- Produced by: Herbert Wilcox
- Starring: Jeanne de Casalis; Frederick Lloyd; Cyril Raymond
- Production company: British and Dominions
- Distributed by: Paramount British Pictures
- Release date: September 1933
- Running time: 69 minutes
- Country: United Kingdom
- Language: English

Mixed Doubles is a 1933 British comedy film directed by Sidney Morgan and starring Jeanne de Casalis, Frederick Lloyd and Cyril Rymond. It was written by Joan Morgan, adapted from the 1925 play of the same name by Frank Stayton, and shot at British and Dominions Elstree Studios as a quota quickie for release by Paramount Pictures. The film revolves around "[r]omantic complications in two marriages".

== Cast ==
- Jeanne de Casalis as Betty Irvine
- Frederick Lloyd as Sir John Doyle
- Molly Johnson as Lady Audrey
- Cyril Raymond as Reggie Irving
- Atholl Fleming as Ian MacConochie
- Rani Waller as Rose MacConochie
- Quinton McPherson as Reverend Arthur Escott
- George McLeod as Consul
- George Bellamy as Barrett

== Bibliography ==
- Chibnall, Steve. Quota Quickies: The Birth of the British 'B' Film. British Film Institute, 2007.
- Low, Rachael. Filmmaking in 1930s Britain. George Allen & Unwin, 1985.
- Wood, Linda. British Films, 1927-1939. British Film Institute, 1986.
