= Alias John Preston =

1955 British film by David MacDonald

- Directed by: David MacDonald
- Written by: Paul Tabori
- Produced by: Edward J. Danziger; Harry Lee Danziger; Sidney Stone (as Sid Stone)
- Starring: Betta St. John; Alexander Knox; Christopher Lee
- Cinematography: Jack E. Cox (as Jack Cox)
- Edited by: Jack Baldwin; Cynthia Moody
- Music by: Edwin Astley; Albert Elms
- Production company: Danziger Productions (as Danziger Photoplays)
- Distributed by: British Lion Film Corporation (UK)
- Release date: 14 December 1955
- Running time: 66 minutes
- Country: United Kingdom
- Language: English

Alias John Preston is a 1955 British second feature ('B') thriller film directed by David MacDonald and starring Betta St. John, Alexander Knox and Christopher Lee. It was written by Paul Tabori, and produced by The Danzigers.

== Plot ==
A mysterious and wealthy man moves to a small village where he outwardly appears to be a friendly figure but nurses a dangerous secret. He keeps experiencing dreams wherein he is strangling a woman, and tries to figure out what it all means.

== Cast ==
- Betta St. John as Sally Sandford
- Alexander Knox as Dr Peter Walton
- Christopher Lee as John Preston
- Sandra Dorne as Sylvia (in dream)
- Patrick Holt as Sylvia's husband (in dream) [credited as Pat Holt]
- Betty Ann Davies as Mrs Sandford
- John Stuart as Dr Underwood
- Bill Fraser as Joe Newton
- Gabrielle Gay as Mrs Doran (dressmaker)
- Peter Grant as Bob Newton
- John Longden as Richard Sandford
- Guido Lorraine as restaurant manager
- Dinah Anne Rogers as Phyllis

== Critical reception ==
The Monthly Film Bulletin wrote: "This static and stagey melodrama is unimaginatively handled, finishing with a trick ending which explains remarkably little. Alexander Knox, as the psychiatrist, brings some degree of plausibility to the proceedings, but the playing generally is characterless."

Kine Weekly wrote: "Its players do their best to bring conviction to the mumbo jumbo, but the task is beyond them. Although it opens promisingly, the play borders on the ludicrous as its climax approaches ...The picture creates interest at the start, but the subsequent flashbacks, which introduce foreign characters, are crude and rob the overall of realism and point. Alexander Knox maintains a professional bearing to the bitter end as Walton, but the others are out of their depth as soon as the tale goes schizophrenic.

Picture Show wrote: "Christopher Lee gives an excellent performance."

The Daily Film Renter wrote: "A beautifully studied performance by Christopher Lee as the perspiring, nightmare-haunted psychotic distinguishes this feature from the average. Scripting is competent, and the gimmick of showing half-real dreams on the screen will keep audiences interested."

In The British 'B' Film Chibnall and McFarlane wrote: "It was a pretty botched job, over-played and under-plotted."

Leslie Halliwell said: "Watchable second feature."

In British Sound Films: The Studio Years 1928–1959 David Quinlan rated the film as "poor", writing: "Dreary, turgid drama: seems much longer than it is."

TV Guide called the film "a poorly developed psychological drama."

Allmovie described it as "an average psychological mystery worth watching for the good performances."

In Offbeat: British Cinema's Curiosities, Obscurities and Forgotten Items, Jennifer Wallis wrote: "The Danzingers' high speed production accounts for the short running time. ...In the context of such whistle-stop production, Alias John Preston is an impressive feat, and in no way a bad film per se. Its tightly compacted plot and self-conscious intensity, though, tire the viewer before becoming somewhat infuriating in their transparency."
