= What Money Can Buy =

1928 film

- Directed by: Edwin Greenwood
- Written by: Ben Landeck (play); Arthur Shirley (play); Edwin Greenwood
- Produced by: Maurice Elvey; Gareth Gundrey
- Starring: Madeleine Carroll; Humberston Wright; John Longden; Alf Goddard
- Production company: Gaumont British Picture Corporation
- Distributed by: Gaumont British Distributors
- Release date: July 1928
- Running time: 6,400 feet
- Country: United Kingdom
- Languages: Silent; English intertitles

What Money Can Buy is a 1928 British silent drama film directed by Edwin Greenwood and starring Madeleine Carroll, Humberston Wright and John Longden. The screenplay concerns a man who makes a bet that he can seduce a woman.

== Plot ==
A rake makes a bet that he can seduce a woman if he offers her enough money.

== Cast ==
- Madeleine Carroll as Rhoda Pearson
- Humberston Wright as Reverend Dennis Norton
- John Longden as Ralph Tresham
- Alf Goddard as Alf
- Cecil Barry as James Lorrimer
- Maudie Dunham as Mrs. Lorrimer
- Anita Sharp-Bolster as Cleaner
- Judd Green as Client

== Bibliography ==
- Low, Rachael. History of the British Film, 1918-1929. George Allen & Unwin, 1971.
