= A Woman in Pawn =

1927 film

- Directed by: Edwin Greenwood
- Written by: Frank Stayton (play and screenplay)
- Produced by: Maurice Elvey; Gareth Gundrey; Victor Saville
- Starring: Gladys Jennings; John Stuart; Lauderdale Maitland; Chili Bouchier
- Cinematography: Gaetano di Ventimiglia
- Production company: Gaumont British
- Distributed by: Gaumont British Distributors
- Release date: October 1927
- Running time: 6,845 feet
- Country: United Kingdom
- Language: English

A Woman in Pawn is a 1927 British silent crime film directed by Edwin Greenwood and starring Gladys Jennings, John Stuart and Lauderdale Maitland. It was based on a melodramatic play by Frank Stayton. It was made at the Lime Grove Studios in Shepherd's Bush.

== Plot ==
A ruined stockbroker is blamed for killing the crooked financier who lured his wife.

== Cast ==
- Gladys Jennings as Diana Rawdon
- John Stuart as James Rawdon
- Lauderdale Maitland as George Zarantis
- Chili Bouchier as Elaine
- Tarva Penna as Phipps
- Karen Petersen as Mrs. Phipps
- Desmond Roberts as David Courthill

== Bibliography ==
- Low, Rachael. History of the British Film, 1918-1929. George Allen & Unwin, 1971.
