= The Glad Eye (1927 film) =

1927 film

- Directed by: Maurice Elvey
- Written by: Jose G. Levy (play); Nicolas Nancey (play); Paul Armont (play); Gareth Gundrey; Victor Saville; Maurice Elvey
- Produced by: Victor Saville; Maurice Elvey
- Starring: Estelle Brody; Mabel Poulton; Jeanne de Casalis; Aubrey Fitzgerald
- Cinematography: Percy Strong; Basil Emmott
- Production company: Gaumont British Picture Corporation
- Distributed by: Gaumont British Distributors
- Release date: July 1927
- Running time: 7,700 feet
- Country: United Kingdom
- Language: English

The Glad Eye is a 1927 British silent comedy film directed by Maurice Elvey and starring Estelle Brody, Mabel Poulton and Jeanne de Casalis. It was a remake of The Glad Eye, a 1920 film based on the play Le Zebre by Nicolas Nancey and Paul Armont. It was made at Twickenham Studios.

== Cast ==
- Estelle Brody as Kiki
- Mabel Poulton as Suzanne
- Jeanne de Casalis as Lucienne
- Hal Sherman as Chausette
- Aubrey Fitzgerald as The Footman
- A. Bromley Davenport as Galipau
- John Longden as Floquet
- John Stuart as Maurice
- Humberston Wright as Gaston

== Bibliography ==
- Low, Rachael. History of the British Film, 1918-1929. George Allen & Unwin, 1971.
- Wood, Linda. British Films 1927-1939. British Film Institute, 1986.
