= Smashing Through (1929 film) =

1929 film

- Directed by: W. P. Kellino
- Written by: L'Estrange Fawcett; John Hunter; William Lees
- Produced by: Maurice Elvey; Gareth Gundrey
- Starring: John Stuart; Eve Gray; Hayford Hobbs; Julie Suedo
- Cinematography: Gaetano di Ventimiglia
- Production company: Gaumont British Picture Corporation
- Distributed by: Gaumont British Distributors (UK); UFA (Germany)
- Release date: September 1928
- Running time: 85 minutes
- Country: United Kingdom
- Language: English

Smashing Through is a 1929 British silent adventure film directed by W. P. Kellino and starring John Stuart, Eve Gray and Hayford Hobbs. It was made at Lime Grove Studios in Shepherd's Bush.

== Cast ==
- John Stuart as Richard Bristol
- Eve Gray as Kitty Masters
- Hayford Hobbs as James Masters, her brother
- Julie Suedo as Miss Duprez
- Sandy McKenzie as Mr. Sergius
- Alf Goddard as Alf, a mechanic
- Mike Johnson as His mate
- Gladys Hamer as Ethyl
- Charles Ashton as Westlake
- Harold Saxon-Snell as Driver

== Bibliography ==
- Low, Rachael. History of the British Film, 1918–1929. George Allen & Unwin, 1971.
