= Woman Hater (1948 film) =

- Directed by: Terence Young
- Screenplay by: Nicholas Phipps; Robert Westerby
- Story by: Alec Coppel
- Produced by: William Sistrom
- Starring: Stewart Granger; Edwige Feuillère; Ronald Squire; Jeanne de Casalis; Mary Jerrold
- Cinematography: André Thomas
- Edited by: Vera Campbell
- Music by: Lambert Williamson
- Production company: Two Cities Films
- Distributed by: General Film Distributors
- Release date: 13 October 1948
- Running time: 105 minutes
- Country: United Kingdom
- Language: English

Woman Hater is a 1948 British romantic comedy film directed by Terence Young and starring Stewart Granger, Edwige Feuillère and Ronald Squire. The screenplay was by Nicholas Phipps and Robert Westerby and concerns Lord Datchett, who, as a consequence of a bet with his friends, invites French film star Colette Marly to stay at his house but pretends to be one of his employees while he tries to romance her with the help of his butler Jameson. When she discovers his subterfuge, she decides to turn the tables on him.

== Plot ==
Lord Datchett believes women are vain, trivial and dull. He is irritated when French film star Colette Marly arrives in London and takes the table in a restaurant where he wanted to sit. He is scathing of her claims in the newspaper that she is tired of publicity and of men pursuing her, believing it to be an attempt to get more attention. He predicts that if she were really left alone she would throw herself at the first man she met. After being challenged by a man at his club, Datchett decides to invite her to stay at his house, aiming to stage a "scientific experiment" and prove his theory.

Marly is weary of the demands of her publicity-seeking agent and being besieged by autograph hunters and journalists. When she receives Datchett's invitation to stay at his house, she accepts in the hope of some solitude. Arriving at his country house with her maid Clair, she is greeted by Datchett's butler Jameson and Lord Datchett who pretends to be Henry Dodds, Datchett's estate manager. The other staff have also been informed to help maintain the deception.

Datchett tries to discover more about Marly, but she is initially unforthcoming. Slowly they become friendly, after they go riding and when Datchett contrives for them to get locked in a cellar for several hours and get drunk on brandy. Clair meanwhile flirts with both Jameson and Patrick, the Irish gardener, provoking them into jealousy and rivalry.

When Reverend Meadows arrives at the house with a christening party for whom Datchett had previously agreed to be a godfather, Marly accidentally discovers Datchett's true identity. Her first angry reaction is to prepare to leave, but then she decides to play along with Datchett's pretense, but intending to teach him a lesson. While out boating on a lake, she pretends to be in distress so that he can rescue her, but when he is knocked unconscious, she becomes the rescuer, but makes him believe he did it.

Datchett's elderly mother Lady Datchett arrives, and he persuades her to join in the ploy and she tries, but without much success. Eventually, Datchett admits he is in love with her and Marly triumphantly reveals that she knows who he really is and what she has done. He goes away, crestfallen, but she then realises she is in love with him.

At the suggestion of Clair, Marly stages a drowning for a second time. Datchett, about to return to London after admitting the experiment was a failure, hears her cries for help and goes to rescue her, but once again, she ends up rescuing him. Safely on the bank, they confess their mutual love and embrace.

== Cast ==
- Stewart Granger as Lord Datchett
- Edwige Feuillère as Colette Marly
- Ronald Squire as Jameson
- Jeanne de Casalis as Clair
- Michael Medwin as Harris
- Miles Malleson as Reverend Meadows
- James Hayter as Burrell
- Dandy Nichols as Mrs. Burrell
- Mary Jerrold as Lady Datchett
- David Hutcheson as Robert
- W.A. Kelly as Patrick
- Georgina Cookson as Julia
- Henry Edwards as Major
- Stewart Rome as Colonel Weston
- Valentine Dyall as Spencer
- Graham Moffatt as autograph hunter
- Davy Burnaby as grandfather
- Vi Kaley as grandmother
- Peter Bull as Fletcher
- Irene Handl as Mrs. Fletcher
- Eddie Sutch as Harry Fletcher

== Production ==
In January 1948, it was announced Australian writer Alec Coppel had sold a story to Stewart Granger called Woman Hater. French actress Edwige Feuillère would co star. Granger was one of the biggest stars in British cinema at the time, best known for appearing in melodramas. He said he wanted to make the film as it gave him a chance to appear in a comedy.

Feuillère arrived in London in mid-February. She had been learning English for three months, a process interrupted by appearing on the Paris stage in The Eagle Has Two Heads which had been a huge success. She was one of a number of French actors appearing in British films at the time, others including Mila Parély in Snowbound, Anne Vernon in Warning to Wantons, and Anouk Aimée in The Golden Salamander.

Filming took started in March 1948, mostly taking place at Denham Studios with sets designed by the art director Carmen Dillon. Location work was done in Warwickshire at Compton Wynyates, the home of the Marquis of Northampton. "Comedy is serious business", said Granger. "It is not always easy to get into the spirit of light hearted sophisticated comedy."

The art director (Carmen Dillon), editor (Vera Campbell), set designer and casting director (Maude Spector) on the film were all women.

== Release ==
The film was released in London in October 1948.

== Reception ==
=== Box office ===
The film did not appear on the list of the "most notable attractions" at the British box office in 1948 or 1949.

=== Critical ===
British critics were harsh on Granger's performance.

The Monthly Film Bulletin wrote: "This film moves quickly and has a highly competent script, and, although the story is slight, it is amusing. It is a relief to see Stewart Granger out of period clothes playing a comedy part. As an actress, Edwige Feuillère is wasted, but she is very nice to look at. In small parts Ronald Squire, Mary Jerrold and Jeanne de Casalis are most competent."

Variety said "Normally, farce doesn't call for much in story values, but relies on laughter-raising situations and snappy dialog. With Woman Hater the situations are too obviously contrived and the dialog so patently transparent that many of the frivolous interludes lose much of their value, and only serve to underline the thinness of the plot."

In The Radio Times Guide to Films Robyn Karney gave the film 2/5 stars, writing: "Creaky, tedious and witless, this totally squanders the talents of an excellent cast."

== Media releases ==
VCI Entertainment released the film on Region 1 DVD on 3 July 2012.
