= Jeanne de Casalis =

British actress (1897–1966)

- Picturegoer postcard
- Born: 22 May 1891; Hlotse Heights, Basutoland, currently Leribe, Lesotho
- Died: 19 August 1966 (age 75); London, United Kingdom
- Occupations: Actress & comedian
- Years active: 1925–1953 (film & TV)

Jeanne de Casalis (22 May 1891 – 19 August 1966) was a Basutoland-born British actress of stage, radio, TV and film.

Born in Basutoland as Jeanne Casalis de Pury in 1891, not 1897 as frequently reported (see the Age Fabrication paragraph below), she was educated in France, where her businessman father was the proprietor of one of that country's largest corset retailers, Charneaux. She began her career in music, only later beginning to work onstage in London. She appeared on stage in The Mask of Virtue with Vivien Leigh (1935), and in Agatha Christie's The Hollow (1951). On radio, she created the popular comic character 'Mrs. Feather' and also authored Mrs Feather's Diary (1936) based on her monologues. Her best-known films were Cottage to Let (1941) and Jamaica Inn (1939).

She married English actor Colin Clive, best remembered for Frankenstein (1931), in June 1929, though they were estranged for several years before his death on 25 June 1937 from tuberculosis. Her second husband, whom she married around 1938, was RAF Wing Commander Cowan Douglas Stephenson; they lived at Hunger Hatch near Ashford, Kent. Jeanne de Casalis died on 19 August 1966, aged 69.

== Age fabrication ==
As confirmed by her death record, Jeanne de Casalis forged her real birth date 22 May 1891 as 22 May 1897, losing 6 years in the process. The practice of age fabrication is commonplace in the entertainment industry. This forgery was made easy by the similarity between the French writing of "1", which is very close to the British writing of "7".

== Partial filmography ==
- Settled Out of Court (1925) .... The Wife
- The Glad Eye (1927) .... Lucienne
- The Arcadians (1927) .... Mrs. Smith
- Zero (1928) .... Julia Norton
- Knowing Men (1930) .... Delphine
- Infatuation (1930, Short) .... Georgette
- Nine till Six (1932) .... Yvonne
- Radio Parade (1933) .... Mrs. Feather
- Mixed Doubles (1933) .... Betty Irvine
- Nell Gwynn (1934) .... Duchess of Portsmouth
- Just like a Woman (1938) .... Poppy Mayne
- Jamaica Inn (1939) .... Sir Humphrey's friend
- The Girl Who Forgot (1940) .... Mrs. Barradine
- Charley's (Big-Hearted) Aunt (1940) .... Lady Lucy Blessington-Smythe (Aunt Lucy)
- Sailors Three (1940) .... Mrs Pilkington
- Cottage to Let (1941) .... Mrs. Barrington
- Those Kids from Town (1942) .... Sheila
- They Met in the Dark (1943) .... Lady with Dog
- Medal for the General (1944) .... Lady Frome
- This Man Is Mine (1946) .... Mrs. Ferguson
- The Turners of Prospect Road (1947) .... Mrs. Webster
- Woman Hater (1948) .... Clair
