= A Daughter in Revolt =

1927 British film by Harry Hughes

- Directed by: Harry Hughes
- Written by: Sidney Gowing (novel); Harry Hughes
- Produced by: Archibald Nettlefold
- Starring: Mabel Poulton; Edward O'Neill; Lilian Oldland
- Production company: Nettlefold Films
- Distributed by: Allied Artists
- Release date: January 1927
- Country: United Kingdom
- Languages: Silent; English intertitles

A Daughter in Revolt is a 1927 British silent comedy film directed by Harry Hughes and starring Mabel Poulton, Edward O'Neill and Lilian Oldland.

== Cast ==
- Mabel Poulton as Aimee Scroope
- Edward O'Neill as Lord Scroope
- Patrick Susands as Billy Spencer
- Lilian Oldland as Georgina Berners
- Patrick Aherne as Jackie the Climber
- Hermione Baddeley as Calamity Kate
- Ena Grossmith as Snooks
- Marie Ault as Mrs. Dale
- Daisy Campbell as Lady Scroope
- Neil Curtis as Alexandre Lambe
- Gertrude Sterroll as Lady Erythea Lambe

== Bibliography ==
- Goble, Alan. The Complete Index to Literary Sources in Film. Walter de Gruyter, 1999.
