= Weekend Wives =

1928 film

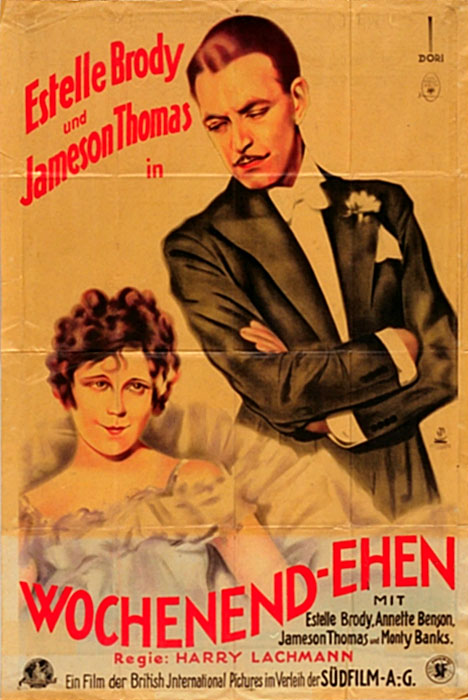
- German poster
- Directed by: Harry Lachman
- Written by: Victor Kendall; Rex Taylor
- Starring: Monty Banks; Jameson Thomas; Estelle Brody; Annette Benson
- Cinematography: Jack E. Cox
- Edited by: Emile de Ruelle
- Production company: British International Pictures
- Distributed by: Wardour Films
- Release date: November 1928
- Running time: 86 minutes
- Country: United Kingdom
- Languages: Silent; English intertitles

Weekend Wives is a 1928 British silent comedy film directed by Harry Lachman and starring Monty Banks, Jameson Thomas and Estelle Brody. It was made at British International Pictures' Elstree Studios. The film is set in Paris and the resort town of Deauville.

One reviewer described it as "beautifully photographed, gowned and set as the average Paramount picture and silly."

== Cast ==
- Monty Banks as Max Ammon
- Jameson Thomas as Henri Monard
- Estelle Brody as Madame le Grand
- Annette Benson as Helene Monard
- George K. Gee as Monsieur le Grand
- Ernest Thesiger as Bertram
- Bebe Brune-Taylor as Yvette
- Koko Arrah as Mickey

== Production ==
Exteriors were filmed in Paris, Biarritz, and Nice.

== Bibliography ==
- Low, Rachael. History of the British Film, 1918-1929. George Allen & Unwin, 1971.
- Wood, Linda. British Films, 1927-1939. British Film Institute, 1986.
