= Sailors Don't Care (1928 film) =

1928 film

- Swedish theatrical release poster
- Directed by: W. P. Kellino
- Written by: Eliot Stannard; "Seamark" (Austin J. Small)
- Produced by: Maurice Elvey; Gareth Gundrey
- Starring: Estelle Brody; John Stuart; Alf Goddard; Humberston Wright
- Cinematography: Gaetano di Ventimiglia; Basil Emmott
- Production company: Gaumont British
- Distributed by: Gaumont British Distributors
- Release date: March 1928
- Running time: 7,500 feet
- Country: United Kingdom
- Language: English

Sailors Don't Care is a 1928 British silent comedy film directed by W. P. Kellino and starring Estelle Brody, John Stuart and Alf Goddard. It was written by Eliot Stannard and Austin J. Small (as "Seamark"), based on a novel by Small.

== Plot ==
Anxious to serve his country. Sir William Graham disguises himself as a sailor and joins his son George's ship, where they help a Q-ship to sink a U-boat.

== Cast ==
- Estelle Brody as Jenny Melrose
- John Stuart as Slinger Woods
- Alf Goddard as Nobby Clark
- Humberston Wright as Sir William Graham
- Gladys Hamer as Rose Bishop
- Mary Brough as Cook
- George Thirlwell as Lieutenant Graham
- Wallace Bosco as Fink
- Vivian Baron as Commander Forrester
- Shayle Gardner as messenger

== Reception ==
Kine Weekly wrote: "Comedy characterisations and war melodrama are not combined with sufficient dramatic skill to make one continuous entertainment. One has to regard the two as separate entities, when ond recognises the ability with which each is handled. Scenes on the lower deck are amusingly done, their effect being heightened by the presence of father and son on the same ship. The encounter between the Q ship and the submarine is very effective, and can be counted on to thrill the average audience. W. P. Kellino has directed each scene well, despite his failure to blend the various types of entertainment in the story. It is all very unpretentious and deliberately 'low-brow,' for which reason it is likely to have the effect on audiences its producers desire."

The Daily Film Renter wrote: "This is a picture which is a certain winner in all kinds of kinemas up and down the country. It starts off with a real swing, and carries on with a sequence of lively lower deck humour, which will make the house ring. Alf Goddard, John Stuart, supported by a splendid lower deck cast, provide heaps of really funny stuff, while Estelle Brody, Gladys Hamer, and Mary Brough keep the fun going on the feminine side. The Q boat stuff is well handled, and is responsible for some excellent dramatic moments with the right sort of thrills. There is not a dull moment from start to finish, and " Sailors Don't Care" is the liveliest naval picture that has come out of a British studio."
