= Yellow Stockings =

1928 film by Theodore Komisarjevsky

- Directed by: Theodore Komisarjevsky
- Written by: Fred Paul; Alicia Ramsey
- Produced by: George Pearson
- Starring: Percy Marmont; Enid Stamp-Taylor; Marie Ault; Georges Galli
- Production company: Welsh-Pearson-Elder
- Distributed by: Paramount Pictures
- Release date: October 1928
- Country: United Kingdom
- Languages: Silent; English intertitles

Yellow Stockings is a 1928 British drama film directed by Theodore Komisarjevsky and starring Percy Marmont, Enid Stamp-Taylor, Marie Ault, and Georges Galli. It was based on a novel by Wilson McArthur and made at Cricklewood Studios.

== Premise ==
After she unexpectedly receives a large inheritance, a young girl is besieged by fortune hunters.

== Cast ==
- Percy Marmont as Gavin Sinclair
- Marjorie Mars as Iris Selton
- Georges Galli as Richard Trevor
- Enid Stamp-Taylor as Nellie Jackson
- Marie Ault as Countess
- Joseph R. Tozer as Tom Jackson
- Franklyn Bellamy as Menelos
- Lydia Sherwood as Erica
- May Calvin as Mona
- Elizabeth Kerr as Mrs Higgins

== Bibliography ==
- Wood, Linda. British Films, 1927-1939. British Film Institute, 1986.
