= Tesha =

1928 British film by Victor Saville and Edwin Greenwood

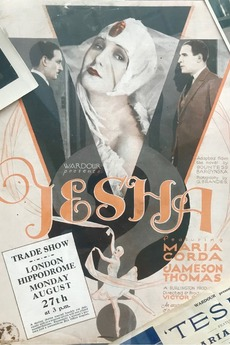
- Directed by: Victor Saville; Edwin Greenwood
- Written by: Countess Barcynska; Walter C. Mycroft; Victor Saville
- Produced by: Victor Saville
- Starring: María Corda; Jameson Thomas; Paul Cavanagh; Mickey Brantford
- Cinematography: Werner Brandes
- Music by: Harry Gordon
- Production companies: British International Pictures; Burlington Films
- Distributed by: Wardour Films
- Release date: 24 August 1928
- Running time: 95 minutes
- Country: United Kingdom
- Languages: Silent Version; Sound Version (Synchronized); English intertitles

Tesha is a 1928 British drama film directed by Victor Saville and Edwin Greenwood and starring María Corda, Jameson Thomas, and Paul Cavanagh. The film was originally shot as a silent film but in 1929 sound was added. While the sound version no audible dialog, it features a synchronized musical score with sound effects. The sound version of the film was released under the title A Woman In The Night in the United States.

== Plot ==
A man's wife has an affair with his best friend and becomes pregnant.

== Cast ==
- María Corda as Tesha
- Jameson Thomas as Robert Dobree
- Paul Cavanagh as Lenane
- Mickey Brantford as Simpson
- Clifford Heatherley as Doctor
- J.J. Espinosa as Dancemaster
- Boris Ranevsky as Tesha's Father
- Daisy Campbell as Mrs Dobree

== Censorship ==
When Tesha was released as A Woman In The Night in the United States, many states and cities in the United States had censor boards that could require cuts or other eliminations before the film could be shown. The Ohio Board of Censors banned the film in its entirety as its theme was considered too immoral.

== Bibliography ==
- Slide, Anthony (1985). Fifty Classic British Films, 1932-1982: A Pictorial Record. Constable and Company. ISBN 978-0486248608.
