= Harry Hughes (director) =

British film director and screenwriter

Harry Hughes was a British screenwriter and film director.

== Selected filmography ==
- The Shadow of Evil (1921)
- A Rogue in Love (1922)
- A Daughter in Revolt (1928)
- The Hellcat (1928)
- Virginia's Husband (1928)
- Troublesome Wives (1928)
- His Wife's Mother (1932)
- Facing the Music (1933)
- A Southern Maid (1933)
- Their Night Out (1933)
- Song at Eventide (1934)
- The Broken Rosary (1934)
- Play Up the Band (1935)
- The Improper Duchess (1936)
- Tropical Trouble (1936)
- The Last Chance (1937)
- The Gables Mystery (1938)
- Mountains O'Mourne (1938)
