= Roses of Picardy (film) =

1927 film

- Directed by: Maurice Elvey
- Written by: R.H. Mottram (novel); Gareth Gundrey; Jack Harris; Fred V. Merrick
- Produced by: Maurice Elvey; M.A. Wetherell; Victor Saville
- Starring: Lillian Hall-Davis; John Stuart; Humberston Wright; Jameson Thomas
- Production company: Gaumont British Picture Corporation
- Distributed by: Gaumont British Distributors
- Release date: April 1927
- Running time: 8,500 feet
- Country: United Kingdom
- Language: English

Roses of Picardy is a 1927 British silent war film directed by Maurice Elvey and starring Lillian Hall-Davis, John Stuart and Humberston Wright. The title is a reference to the popular First World War song Roses of Picardy. It was based on the novels The Spanish Farm (1924) Sixty-Four, Ninety-Four (1925) by R.H. Mottram. It was made at the Cricklewood Studios in London.

== Cast ==
- Lillian Hall-Davis - Madame Vanderlynden
- John Stuart - Lieutenant Skene
- Humberston Wright - Jerome Vanderlynden
- Jameson Thomas - Georges d'Archeville
- Marie Ault - Baroness d'Archeville
- A. Bromley Davenport - Baron d'Archeville
- Clifford Heatherley - Uncle

== Bibliography ==
- Low, Rachel. The History of British Film: Volume IV, 1918–1929. Routledge, 1997.
