= The Flight Commander (film) =

1927 film

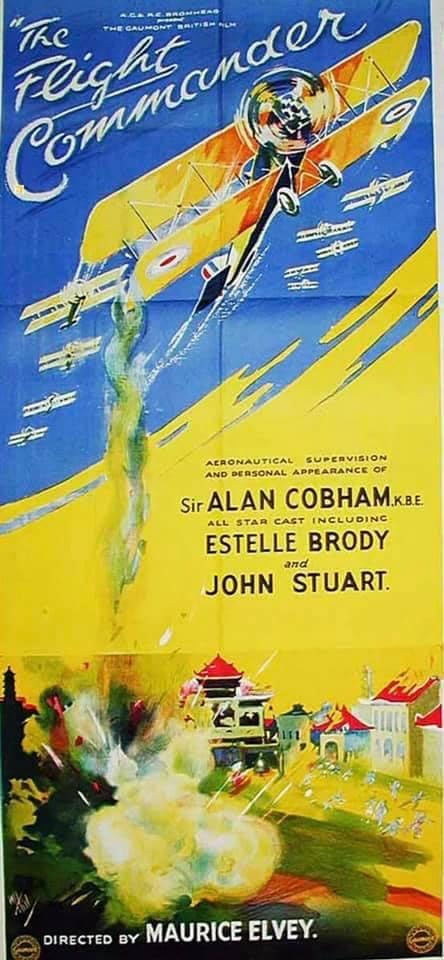
- Directed by: Maurice Elvey
- Written by: Eugene Clifford; John Travers
- Produced by: Maurice Elvey; Gareth Gundrey; Victor Saville
- Starring: Alan Cobham; Estelle Brody; John Stuart; Humberston Wright
- Cinematography: Basil Emmott; Percy Strong
- Production company: Gaumont British Picture Corporation
- Distributed by: Gaumont British Distributors
- Release date: September 1927
- Running time: 8,000 feet
- Country: United Kingdom
- Language: English

The Flight Commander is a 1927 British silent war film directed by Maurice Elvey and starring Alan Cobham, Estelle Brody and John Stuart. It was made by British Gaumont at their Lime Grove Studios in Shepherd's Bush. The celebrated First World War pilot Alan Cobham appeared as himself. It is also known by the alternative title of With Cobham to the Cape.

The film focused on the bombardment of a Chinese town. It was built with great publicity in Hendon.

== Cast ==
- Alan Cobham as himself
- Estelle Brody as Mary
- John Stuart as John Massey
- Humberston Wright as James Mortimer
- Vesta Sylva as Babette
- Alf Goddard as Tommy
- John Longden as Ivan
- Cyril McLaglen as Sammy
- William Pardue as Pierre
- A. Bromley Davenport as Philosopher
- Edward O'Neill as Missionary

== Bibliography ==
- Low, Rachael. History of the British Film, 1918-1929. George Allen & Unwin, 1971.
- Wood, Linda. British Films 1927-1939. British Film Institute, 1986.
