= If Four Walls Told =

1923 film directed by Fred Paul

- Directed by: Fred Paul
- Written by: Edward Percy (play); Walter Summers
- Produced by: G.B. Samuelson
- Starring: Lillian Hall-Davis; Fred Paul; Campbell Gullan; John Stuart
- Production company: British-Super Films
- Distributed by: Jury Films
- Release date: 1923
- Country: United Kingdom
- Language: English

If Four Walls Told is a 1923 British silent drama film directed by Fred Paul and starring Lillian Hall-Davis, Fred Paul and Campbell Gullan. It was based on a play by Edward Percy.

== Cast ==
- Lillian Hall-Davis – Martha Tregoning
- Fred Paul – Jan Rysling / Tom
- Campbell Gullan – David Rysling
- John Stuart – Ned Mason
- Minna Grey – Elizabeth Rysling
- Enid King – Clare Sturgis
- Polly Emery – Mrs. Sturgis
- Somers Bellamy – Toby Crouch

== Bibliography ==
- Low, Rachael. The History of British Film, Volume 4 1918–1929. Routledge, 1997.
