= Quinneys (1927 film) =

1927 British film by Maurice Elvey

- Directed by: Maurice Elvey
- Written by: Horace Annesley Vachell (play); John Longden
- Produced by: Gareth Gundrey
- Starring: John Longden; Alma Taylor; Henry Vibart; Cyril McLaglen
- Edited by: Basil Emmott; Percy Strong
- Production company: Gaumont British Picture Corporation
- Distributed by: Gaumont British Distributors
- Release date: December 1927
- Running time: 8,600 feet
- Country: United Kingdom
- Language: English

Quinneys is a 1927 British romance film directed by Maurice Elvey and starring John Longden, Alma Taylor and Henry Vibart. It is an adaptation of the play Quinneys by Horace Annesley Vachell. David Lean worked on the film as a camera assistant. It was made by Gaumont British at their Lime Grove Studios.

== Plot ==
The screenplay concerns a British furniture salesman who buys some chairs from an American dealer, only to discover that they are fakes.

== Cast ==
- John Longden as Joseph Quinney
- Alma Taylor as Susan Quinney
- Henry Vibart as Lord Melchester
- Cyril McLaglen as Jim Miggott
- Ursula Jeans as Mabel Dredge
- Frances Cuyler as Posy
- Wallace Bosco as Tomlin

== Bibliography ==
- Low, Rachael. History of the British Film, 1918-1929. George Allen & Unwin, 1971.
- Philips, Gene D. Beyond the Epic: The Life & Films of David Lean. University Press of Kentucky, 2006.
