= Balaclava (film) =

1928 British film by Maurice Elvey

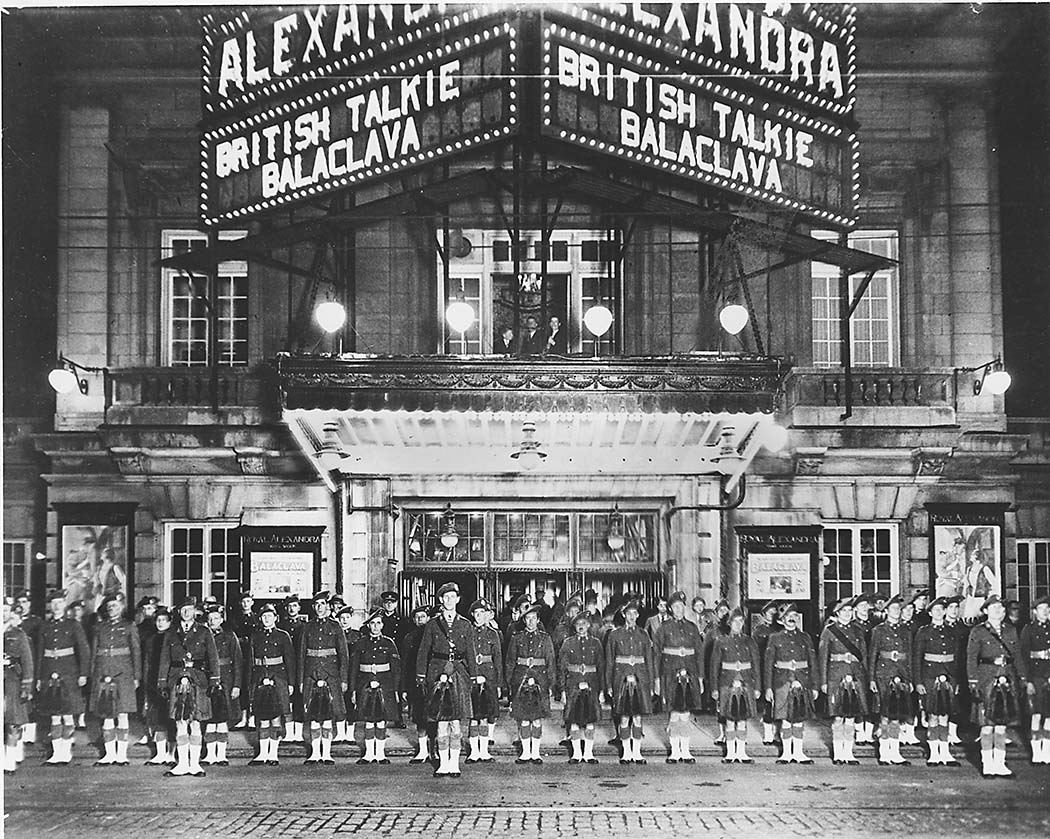
- Balaclava at the Royal Alexandra Theatre in Toronto, Canada, after its release as a talkie
- Directed by: Maurice Elvey; Milton Rosmer
- Written by: Boyd Cable; Gareth Gundrey; W. P. Lipscomb; Angus MacPhail; Milton Rosmer; Robert Stevenson
- Based on: "The Charge of the Light Brigade" by Alfred, Lord Tennyson
- Produced by: Michael Balcon
- Starring: Cyril McLaglen; Benita Hume; Alf Goddard; Miles Mander
- Cinematography: Percy Strong; James Wilson
- Edited by: Ian Dalrymple
- Music by: Louis Levy
- Production company: Gainsborough Pictures
- Distributed by: Woolf & Freedman Film Service
- Release date: 6 June 1928 (UK)
- Country: United Kingdom
- Languages: Silent Version (1928); Sound Version (1930) (English Intertitles)

Balaclava is a 1928 British silent and sound war film directed by Maurice Elvey and Milton Rosmer and starring Cyril McLaglen, Benita Hume, Alf Goddard, Harold Huth, and Wally Patch. It was made by Gainsborough Pictures with David Lean working as a production assistant. The charge sequences were filmed on the Long Valley in Aldershot in Hampshire. Although the sound version had no audible dialogue, it featured a synchronized musical score with sound effects. The sound version was released in the United States under the title Jaws Of Hell.

== Plot ==
A British army officer is cashiered, and re-enlists as a private to take part in the Crimean War. He succeeds in capturing a top Russian spy. The film climaxes with the Charge of the Light Brigade.

== Cast ==
- Cyril McLaglen as John Kennedy
- Benita Hume as Jean McDonald
- Alf Goddard as Nobby
- Miles Mander as Captain Gardner
- J. Fisher White as Lord Raglan
- Henry Mollison as Prisoner's Friend
- Betty Bolton as Natasha
- Robert Holmes as Father Nikolai
- Harold Huth as Captain Nolan, Adjutant
- Wally Patch as Trooper Strang
- H. St. Barbe West as Prosecutor
- Boris Ranevsky as Tsar
- Wallace Bosco as Lord Palmerston
- Marian Drada as Queen Victoria

== Production ==
Portions of Balaclava were reshot under the direction of Milton Rosmer with dialogue written by Robert Stevenson and it was re-released as a sound film which featured a synchronized musical soundtrack with sound effects in April 1930.
