= Troublesome Wives =

1928 film

- Directed by: Harry Hughes
- Written by: Ernest Denny (play); Harry Hughes
- Produced by: Archibald Nettlefold
- Starring: Eric Bransby Williams; Mabel Poulton; Lilian Oldland; Reginald Fox
- Cinematography: Charles Bryce
- Production company: Nettlefold Films
- Distributed by: Butcher's Film Service
- Release date: 21 August 1928
- Running time: 5,870 feet
- Country: United Kingdom
- Language: English

Troublesome Wives is a 1928 British silent comedy film directed by Harry Hughes and starring Eric Bransby Williams, Mabel Poulton and Lilian Oldland. It was based on the play Summer Lightning by Ernest Denny. The screenplay concerns two housewives who become embroiled with a foreign spy network.

== Cast ==
- Eric Bransby Williams - Eric Paget
- Mabel Poulton - Betty Paget
- Lilian Oldland - Norah Cameron
- Roy Russell - Alec Cameron
- Reginald Fox - Maxwell
- Marie Ault - Aunt Mary
