= Symphony in Two Flats =

1930 film

- Cyril Richard and Benita Hume in the film.
- Directed by: Gareth Gundrey
- Written by: Gareth Gundrey; Angus MacPhail
- Based on: Symphony in Two Flats by Ivor Novello
- Produced by: Michael Balcon
- Starring: Ivor Novello; Benita Hume; Jacqueline Logan
- Cinematography: James Wilson
- Edited by: Ian Dalrymple
- Music by: Louis Levy; Eric Coates
- Production company: Gainsborough Pictures
- Distributed by: Gaumont British Distributors
- Release date: 16 July 1930
- Running time: 86 minutes
- Country: United Kingdom
- Language: English

Symphony in Two Flats is a 1930 British drama film directed by Gareth Gundrey and starring Ivor Novello, Benita Hume, Jacqueline Logan and Cyril Ritchard. It was written by Gundrey and Angus MacPhail, adaptated from the successful 1929 West End play of the same title by Novello. It was made at Elstree and Islington Studios with sets designed by Alex Vetchinsky. It was Gainsbrough's first full-length sound film.

Separate versions were made for the United Kingdom and United States releases, with Jacqueline Logan replacing Benita Hume in the American version.

== Plot ==
Musician David Kennard sets out to compose a symphony for a big money prize in a competition run by a record company. Over-work and intense strain on the project cause him to become blind. When his symphony is not accepted, wealthy Leo Chavasse, who is in love with Kennard's wife Lesley, tells David he has won the competition, and gives him a cheque. When David subsequently learns the truth, he rejects Lesley, and they separate. He then uses the symphony as the basis for popular song, which is a huge success.

== Cast ==
- Ivor Novello as David Kennard
- Benita Hume as Lesley Fullerton (UK version)
- Jacqueline Logan as Leslie Fullerton (US version)
- Cyril Ritchard as Leo Chavasse
- Renee Clama as Elsie
- Minnie Rayner as Mabel
- Maidie Andrews as Miss Trebelly
- Clifford Heatherley as Wainwright
- Ernest A. Dagnall as Bradfield
- Alex Scott-Gatty as Doctor Mortimer
- Jack Payne as himself

== Reception ==
Film Weekly wrote: "Ivor Novello's first talkie is a good show with Novello putting up a sincere performance and even giving us really clever acting in emotional scenes."

Kine Weekly wrote: "A modern emotional drama, freely adapted from the popular stage play by Ivor Novello, which is rather slow in development owing to the intrusion of a good deal of idle talk, but is well mounted and carries a certain feminine, if not general, appeal."
