= John Longden =

English actor (1900–1971)

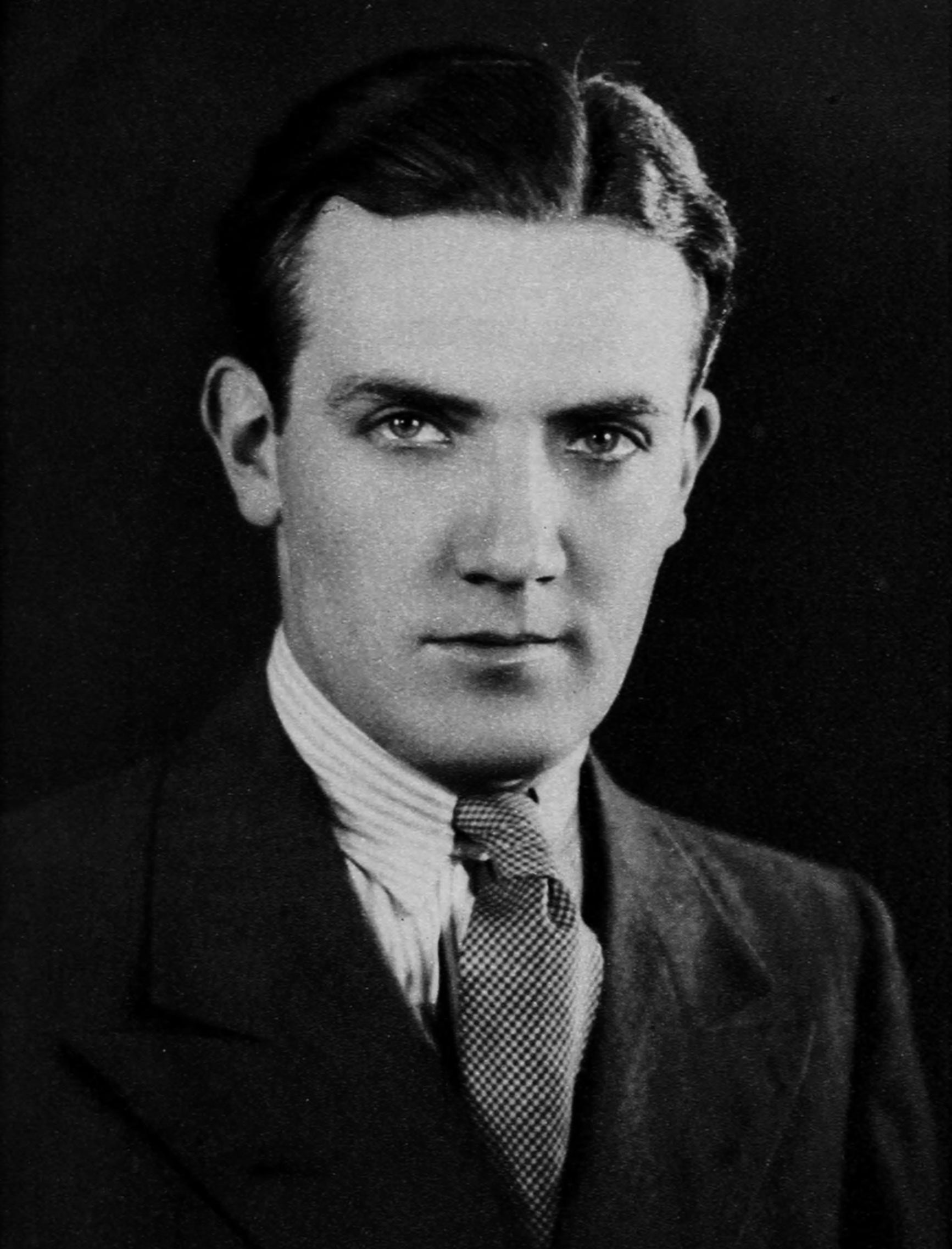
- Longden in 1931
- Born: 11 November 1900; West Indies
- Died: 26 May 1971 (aged 70); Barnstaple Devon, England
- Occupation: Actor
- Years active: 1926–1964
- Spouse: Jean Jay (m. 1926; div)

John Longden (11 November 1900 – 26 May 1971) was a British film actor. He appeared in more than 80 films between 1926 and 1964, including six films directed by Alfred Hitchcock.

== Biography ==
Longden was born in the West Indies, the son of a Methodist missionary, and was educated at Kingswood School, Bath, Somerset. Originally intending to be a mining engineer, he worked for two years in a coal mine in Yorkshire, where he started acting in amateur theatrical companies. An introduction to Seymour Hicks saw him start acting on the legitimate stage, beginning with a walk-on part in Old Bill, MP. He played in My Old Dutch with Albert Chevalier, then spent time with the Liverpool and Birmingham repertory theatres. He also appeared in The Farmer's Wife, produced by Barry Jackson at the Court Theatre in London for two years.

About this time, Longden began to appear in silent films. He signed a contract with Gaumont British Pictures to write and act, earning a notable success with Alfred Hitchcock's Blackmail (1929). He also directed the 1932 quota quickie Come Into My Parlour, which was released by MGM.

=== Australian interlude ===
Longden went to Australia in 1933 to perform in several plays. While there, he appeared in the film The Silence of Dean Maitland (1934) for Cinesound Productions.

The performance was very well received. Longden took on the roles of two more films for the same company, Thoroughbred (1936) and It Isn't Done (1937).

John Longden at the departure of Strathnaver, 1936

In 1934, it was announced that he was going to play the lead in an adaptation of Robbery Under Arms, but this film was never made. The same year, Longden also announced he was going to act in and direct an Australian film called Highway Romance, about an English man and Australian girl travelling from Sydney to Brisbane. A company called Highway Productions was formed with Frederick Ward and a capital of £10,000 but the film was not made.

=== Later career ===
Longden returned to Britain where he continued to work steadily in theatre (including playing Inspector Hornleigh, a popular radio detective of the period, at the Prince's Theatre, Shaftesbury Avenue, in 1938) and film (including An Honourable Murder (1960), an adaptation of Shakespeare's Julius Caesar, in which he played a tycoon named Julian Caesar). He appeared on several episodes of season one of The Adventures of Robin Hood playing various characters, and returned for one episode in season three. He died in Barnstaple on 26 May 1971, aged 70.

== Selected filmography ==
- The Ball of Fortune (1926) - Daltry
- The House of Marney (1927) - Richard
- The Glad Eye (1927) - Floquet
- The Flight Commander (1927) - Ivan
- The Arcadians (1927) - Jack Meadows
- Quinneys (1927) - Joseph Quinney
- Mademoiselle Parley Voo (1928) - Le Beau - Illusionist
- Palais de danse (1928) - No. 1
- What Money Can Buy (1928) - Ralph Tresham
- You Know What Sailors Are (1928) - Minor Role
- The Flying Squad (1929) - Inspector John Bradley
- Piccadilly (1929) - Man from China (uncredited)
- Blackmail (1929) - Detective Frank Webber
- Atlantic (1929) - Lanchester
- The Last Post (1929) - David / Martin
- Elstree Calling (1930)
- The Flame of Love (1930) - Lieutenant Boris Boriskoff
- Juno and the Paycock (1930) - Charles Bentham
- Two Worlds (1930) - Lt. Stanislaus von Zaminsky (British Version)
- Children of Chance (1930) - Jeffrey
- The Skin Game (1931) - Charles Hornblower
- Two Crowded Hours (1931, Short) - Harry Fielding
- The Ringer (1931) - Inspector Wembury
- Hindle Wakes (1931) - Boyfriend (uncredited)
- Murder on the Second Floor (1932) - Warder Jackson
- The Wickham Mystery (1932) - Harry Crawford
- A Lucky Sweep (1932) - Bill Higgins
- Rynox (1932) - Tony Benedik
- Born Lucky (1933) - Frank Dale
- The Silence of Dean Maitland (1934) - Dean Cyril Maitland
- Thoroughbred (1936) - Bill Peel
- It Isn't Done (1937) - Peter Ashton
- French Leave (1937) - Lt. Glennister
- Jennifer Hale (1937) - Police Inspector Merton
- Young and Innocent (1937) - Det. Insp. Kent
- Little Miss Somebody (1937) - Jim Trevor
- Dial 999 (1938) - Bill Waring
- The Gaunt Stranger (1938) - Inspector Bliss
- Bad Boy (1938) - Inspector Thompson
- Q Planes (1939) - Peters
- Jamaica Inn (1939) - Captain Johnson (uncredited)
- Goodbye, Mr. Chips (1939) - Raven (uncredited)
- The Lion Has Wings (1939)
- Contraband (1940) - Passport Officer
- Tower of Terror (1941) - Commandant
- Old Mother Riley's Circus (1941) - Bill
- The Common Touch (1941) - Stuart Gordon
- This Was Paris (1942) - French Officer (uncredited)
- One of Our Aircraft Is Missing (1942) - Ground Officer (uncredited)
- Unpublished Story (1942) - Metcalf (uncredited)
- Rose of Tralee (1942) - Paddy O'Brien
- The Silver Fleet (1943) - Jost Meertens
- Yellow Canary (1943) - Officer (uncredited)
- Death by Design (1943) - Inspector Slade
- A Matter of Life and Death (1946) - Narrator (voice, uncredited)
- Dusty Bates (1947) - Tod Jenkins
- The Ghosts of Berkeley Square (1947) - Mortimer Digby
- Anna Karenina (1948) - Gen. Serpuhousky
- The Last Load (1948) - Mr. Potter
- Bonnie Prince Charlie (1948) - Col. O'Sullivan
- Trapped by the Terror (1949) - Pierre
- Feature Story (1949)
- The Elusive Pimpernel (1949) - The Abbot
- The Lady Craved Excitement (1950) - Inspector James
- The Man Who Disappeared - Sherlock Holmes
- Pool of London (1951) - Det. Insp. Williams
- The Dark Light (1951) - Stephen
- The Magic Box (1951) - Speaker in Connaught Rooms
- Black Widow (1951) - Mr. Kemp
- The Wallet (1952) - Man With Pipe
- Dangerous Cargo (1954) - Worthington
- Meet Mr. Callaghan (1954) - Jeremy Meraulton
- The Ship That Died of Shame (1955) - The Detective
- Alias John Preston (1955) - Richard Sandford
- Count of Twelve (1955) - Simon Graves (episode "The Count of Twelve")
- Raiders of the River (1956) - Professor Dykes
- Quatermass 2 (1957) - Lomax
- Three Sundays to Live (1957) - Warder
- Innocent Sinners (1958) - Admiral (uncredited)
- A Woman's Temptation (1959) - Inspector Syms
- An Honourable Murder (1960) - Julian Caesar
- So Evil, So Young (1961) - Turner
- Lancelot and Guinevere (1963) - King Leodogran (uncredited)
- The Man Who Finally Died (1963) - Munch (uncredited)
- Frozen Alive (1964) - Prof. Hubbard
