= Alf Goddard =

English actor (1897–1981)

- Born: Frank Henry Goddard; 28 November 1897; Brentford, Middlesex, England
- Died: 26 February 1981 (aged 83); Ealing, London, England
- Occupation: Film actor
- Years active: 1925–1953

Frank Henry "Alf" Goddard (28 November 1897 in Brentford, Middlesex – 25 February 1981 in Ealing, London) was an English film actor.

Brother of a famous boxer, Alf Goddard was once a boxer too. He was also a trained athlete and a professional dancer. He served in the army in World War I and when he was invalided out he worked on munitions. He made his stage debut in a musical hall act in 1916. His first appearance in films was as a stunt double where he did a number of risky jobs like jumping off bridges and swimming in rough seas. This led to him being given acting parts. Later he moved on to comedy roles.

== Filmography ==
- Mademoiselle from Armentieres (1926)
- White Heat (1926)
- Every Mother's Son (1926)
- Hindle Wakes (1927)
- Carry On (1927)
- The Flight Commander (1927)
- Second to None (1927)
- A Sister to Assist 'Er (1927)
- Downhill (1927)
- What Money Can Buy (1928)
- Smashing Through (1928)
- Balaclava (1928)
- Mademoiselle Parley Voo (1928)
- Sailors Don't Care (1928)
- You Know What Sailors Are (1928)
- The Last Post (1929)
- Down Channel (1929)
- High Treason (1929)
- Alf's Button (1930)
- The Nipper (1930)
- Bed and Breakfast (1930)
- East Lynne on the Western Front (1931)
- Old Soldiers Never Die (1931)
- The Happy Ending (1931)
- Splinters in the Navy (1931)
- The Third String (1932)
- Enemy of the Police (1933)
- Too Many Wives (1933)
- The Pride of the Force (1933)
- Lost in the Legion (1934)
- It's a Bet (1935)
- Strictly Illegal (1935)
- No Limit (1935)
- The Amazing Quest of Ernest Bliss (1936)
- Song of Freedom (1936)
- The Squeaker (1937)
- Farewell Again (1937)
- King Solomon's Mines (1937)
- Non-Stop New York (1937)
- The Green Cockatoo (1937)
- Owd Bob (1938)
- Convict 99 (1938)
- Luck of the Navy (1938)
- The Ware Case (1938)
- The Drum (1938)
- Bank Holiday (1938)
- Sidewalks of London (1938)
- Night Journey (1938)
- Murder in Soho (1939)
- Let's Be Famous (1939)
- Return to Yesterday (1940)
- Spy for a Day (1940)
- A Window in London (1940)
- Convoy (1940)
- South American George (1941)
- The Young Mr. Pitt (1942)
- Much Too Shy (1942)
- The Saint Meets the Tiger (1943)
- They Met in the Dark (1943)
- The Butler's Dilemma (1943)
- The Way Ahead (1944)
- The Way to the Stars (1945)
- Perfect Strangers (1945)
- I'll Be Your Sweetheart (1945)
- Innocents in Paris (1953)
