= Bed and Breakfast (1930 film) =

1930 British film by Walter Forde

- Trade show advertisement
- Directed by: Walter Forde
- Written by: Sidney Gilliat
- Based on: Bed and Breakfast by Frederick Whitney
- Produced by: L'Estrange Fawcett
- Starring: Jane Baxter; Richard Cooper; Sari Maritza; Alf Goddard
- Cinematography: William Shenton
- Production company: Gaumont British Picture Corporation
- Distributed by: Gaumont British Distributors
- Release date: 22 December 1930
- Running time: 68 minutes
- Country: United Kingdom
- Language: English

Bed and Breakfast is a 1930 British comedy film directed by Walter Forde and starring Jane Baxter, Richard Cooper and Sari Maritza. It was written Sidney Gilliat based on a play by Frederick Whitney.

== Preservation status ==
Thought to have been lost, the film was found as a result of a 1992 British Film Institute campaign to locate missing films.

== Cast ==
- Jane Baxter as Audrey Corteline
- Richard Cooper as Toby Entwhistle
- Sari Maritza as Anne Entwhistle
- Alf Goddard as Alf Dunning
- David Hawthorne as Bernard Corteline
- Cyril McLaglen as Bill
- Ruth Maitland as Mimosa Dunning
- Muriel Aked as Mrs. Boase
- Frederick Volpe as Canon Boase
- Mike Johnson as Henry
- Matthew Boulton as Police Sergeant

== Reception ==
Film Weekly wrote: "Two clever artists play the leading roles, and both of them are young people who should have a future in British productions. The first is Richard Cooper; known on the stage as 'Charley's Aunt' and to filmgoers for his work in The House of the Arrow, and Lord Richard in the Pantry. The second is Jane Baxter, an attractive young stage actress, who has been very successful in Ian Hay-P. G. Wodehouse farces in the West End."

The Daily Film Renter wrote: "Good hearty farce comedy. Many diverting characterisations and a succession of amusingly complicated situations. Directed by Walter Forde so as to bring out all the native humour possible, and a good cast puts it over well. Popular fare; that will draw big publics throughout the country."

Kine Weekly wrote: "A Popular type of farcical comedy which, while it lacks subtlety and piquancy, has a steady vein of broad humour which will undoubtedly appeal to the masses, The methods of Richard Cooper and Alf Goddard contrast effectively, and there is a suggestion of naughtiness which adds the necessary spice to the entertainment. The staging is good, the recording clear, and the support efficient."
