= Cyril McLaglen =

British actor (1899–1987)

- Born: 9 September 1899; London; United Kingdom
- Died: 11 July 1987 (aged 87); Perris, California, United States
- Occupation: Actor
- Years active: 1920–1951

Cyril McLaglen (9 September 1899 – 11 July 1987) was a British actor who appeared in a variety of films between 1920 and 1951. He was born in London in 1899 and made his film debut in the 1920 film The Call of the Road. He was the younger brother of the actor Victor McLaglen.

McLaglen enjoyed success in the late silent era, and was placed under contract to Gainsborough Pictures, appearing in some of the studio's biggest films of the late 1920s. His career started to falter with the arrival of sound and he began to appear in low-budget quota quickies.

In the mid-1930s, he emigrated to the United States, but his roles in Hollywood were even more limited and often consisted of small, often uncredited roles. His screen career had wound down by 1942, but he made one final appearance in the 1951 film Soldiers Three.

== Filmography ==
- The Call of the Road (1920)
- The Island of Despair (1926)
- Madame Pompadour (1927)
- Hindle Wakes (1927)
- Boadicea (1927)
- The Arcadians (1927)
- Quinneys (1927)
- The Flight Commander (1927)
- Tommy Atkins (1928)
- You Know What Sailors Are (1928)
- Balaclava (1928)
- Underground (1928)
- Lost Patrol (1929)
- Alf's Button (1930)
- Suspense (1930)
- Bed and Breakfast (1930)
- No Lady (1931)
- Down River (1931)
- The Brat (1931)
- Josser Joins the Navy (1932)
- Verdict of the Sea (1932)
- The Fear Ship (1933)
- A Royal Demand (1933)
- Money for Speed (1933)
- The Secret of the Loch (1934)
- The Band Plays On (1934)
- Peter Ibbetson (1935)
- Whipsaw (1935)
- A Tale of Two Cities (1935)
- Mary of Scotland (1936)
- The Plough and the Stars (1936)
- Toilers of the Sea (1936)
- Wee Willie Winkie (1937)
- Four Men and a Prayer (1938)
- The Long Voyage Home (1940)
- They Met in Bombay (1941)
- Dr. Jekyll and Mr. Hyde (1941)
- Son of Fury (1942)
- Reap the Wild Wind (1942)
- Random Harvest (1942)
- The Black Swan (1942)
- Soldiers Three (1951)
