= Mademoiselle Parley Voo =

1928 film

- Directed by: Maurice Elvey
- Written by: F.V. Merrick; Jack Harris
- Produced by: Gareth Gundrey
- Starring: Estelle Brody; John Stuart; Alf Goddard; John Longden
- Production company: Gaumont British Picture Corporation
- Distributed by: Gaumont British Picture Corporation
- Release date: June 1928
- Running time: 7,300 feet
- Country: United Kingdom
- Languages: Silent; English intertitles

Mademoiselle Parley Voo is a 1928 British silent drama film directed by Maurice Elvey and starring Estelle Brody, John Stuart and Alf Goddard. It was made as a sequel to Elvey's earlier hit Mademoiselle from Armentieres (1926), and was equally successful. Both films refer to the popular First World War song Mademoiselle from Armentières. It was made at Lime Grove Studios in Shepherd's Bush.

== Cast ==
- Estelle Brody as Mademoiselle
- John Stuart as John
- Alf Goddard as Fred
- John Longden as Le Beau
- John Ashby as Their Son
- Humberstone Wright as The Old Soldier
- Wallace Bosco as Bollinger

== Bibliography ==
- Low, Rachel. The History of British Film: Volume IV, 1918–1929. Routledge, 1997.
