= Palais de danse (film) =

1928 film

- German poster
- Directed by: Maurice Elvey
- Written by: Jean Jay; John Longden
- Produced by: Gareth Gundrey; Maurice Elvey
- Starring: Mabel Poulton; John Longden; Robin Irvine; Hilda Moore
- Cinematography: Percy Strong
- Production company: Gaumont British Picture Corporation
- Distributed by: Gaumont British Distributors; UFA (Germany)
- Release date: July 1928
- Running time: 7,697 feet
- Country: United Kingdom
- Languages: Silent; English intertitles

Palais de danse is a 1928 British silent drama film directed by Maurice Elvey and starring Mabel Poulton, John Longden and Robin Irvine.

== Cast ==
- Mabel Poulton as No. 16
- John Longden as No. 1
- Robin Irvine as Tony King
- Hilda Moore as Lady King
- Chili Bouchier as No. 2
- Jerrold Robertshaw as Sir William King

== Bibliography ==
- Low, Rachel. The History of British Film: Volume IV, 1918–1929. Routledge, 1997.
