= Mademoiselle from Armentieres (film) =

Lost 1926 silent film

- Promotional poster
- Directed by: Maurice Elvey
- Written by: Maurice Elvey; Victor Saville
- Produced by: Victor Saville
- Starring: Estelle Brody; John Stuart
- Cinematography: William Shenton
- Production company: Gaumont British
- Release date: September 1926
- Running time: 55 minutes
- Country: United Kingdom

Mademoiselle from Armentieres is a 1926 British World War I silent drama film directed by Maurice Elvey and starring Estelle Brody, John Stuart and Alf Goddard. The film was Elvey's first collaboration with screenwriter Victor Saville. It was followed by a 1928 sequel Mademoiselle Parley Voo.

== Plot ==
The unnamed Mademoiselle (Brody) helps her aunt to run a restaurant in Armentières. British soldier Johnny (Stuart) has fallen in love with her, and she shows signs of reciprocation. The local liaison officer asks Mademoiselle whether she can find out anything about a customer named Branz, who has aroused suspicion. By working her charms on him to gain his confidence, she discovers that he is a German spy. Mademoiselle has to keep her mission secret to avoid giving away her real motives. However Johnny misinterprets the attention she pays to Brandt, assuming her to be fickle.

Johnny is summoned to the fighting line before Mademoiselle can explain herself. Once she has fulfilled her mission, she goes in search of Johnny to put him in the picture. She finds his regiment in a captured German trench, with Johnny wounded. Then the trench is recaptured by the Germans with Branz in tow. Things look bleak until the British forces counter-attack and once again take the trench, killing Branz in the process. Mademoiselle and Johnny are trapped when the trench wall collapses, but manage to extricate themselves and look forward to their future together.

== Cast ==
- Estelle Brody as Mademoiselle
- John Stuart as Johnny
- Marie Ault as Aunt
- Gabriel Rosca as Branz
- Alf Goddard as Fred
- Clifford Heatherley as Interrogator
- Humberston Wright as Old Soldier
- Boris Ranevsky as Liaison Officer

== Later history ==
The film opened in London in September 1926 and was still playing in cinemas around the country until well into 1927. It was reportedly the most profitable British film of 1926 and made an instant star of Brody.

The British Film Institute holds fragments amounting to around one third of the film in the BFI National Archive, but the remaining two thirds cannot be found and the film as a whole is classed as "missing, believed lost". It is included on the BFI's "75 Most Wanted" list of missing British feature films.
