= You Know What Sailors Are (1928 film) =

1928 film

- Chili Bouchier
- Directed by: Maurice Elvey
- Written by: E.W. Townsend (novel)
- Produced by: A.C. Bromhead and R.C. Bromhead
- Cinematography: Percy Strong
- Production company: Gaumont British Picture Corporation
- Distributed by: Gaumont British Distributors (UK); Universum Film (Germany)
- Release date: December 1928
- Running time: 80 minutes
- Country: United Kingdom
- Language: English

You Know What Sailors Are is a 1928 British silent comedy drama film directed by Maurice Elvey and starring Alf Goddard, Cyril McLaglen and Chili Bouchier. It was made at Lime Grove Studios in Shepherd's Bush, London, UK. The film is based on the novel A Light for his Pipe by E.W. Townsend.

== Premise ==
The crews of British and Spanish ships enter into a bitter rivalry.

== Cast ==
- Alf Goddard as the British Mate
- Cyril McLaglen as the Spanish Mate
- Chili Bouchier as the Spanish Captain's Daughter
- Jerrold Robertshaw as the Spanish Captain
- Mathilde Comont as the British Captain
- Leonard Barry as the British Captain's Husband
- Mike Johnson as Seaman
- Wally Patch as Seaman
