= Gareth Gundrey =

British film director, producer and screenwriter (1893–1965)

Gareth Gundrey (1893–1965) was a British producer, screenwriter and film director.

== Selected filmography ==
Director

- Just for a Song (1930)
- Symphony in Two Flats (1930)
- The Stronger Sex (1931)
- The Hound of the Baskervilles (1932)

Producer

- Quinneys (1927)
- A Woman in Pawn (1927)
- The Flight Commander (1927)
- Mademoiselle Parley Voo (1928)
- Palais de danse (1928)
- Smashing Through (1929)

Screenwriter

- Roses of Picardy (1927)
- Balaclava (1928)
