= Victor Saville =

English film director (1895–1979)

- Victor Saville in 1936
- Born: 25 September 1895; Birmingham, England
- Died: 8 May 1979 (aged 83); London, England
- Occupations: Film director, producer, screenwriter
- Years active: 1923–1962

Victor Saville (25 September 1895 – 8 May 1979) was an English film director, producer, and screenwriter. He directed 39 films between 1927 and 1954. He also produced 36 films between 1923 and 1962.

== Biography ==
Saville produced his first film, Woman to Woman, with Michael Balcon in 1923, and on the back of its success produced pictures for the veteran director Maurice Elvey, including the classic British silent Hindle Wakes (1927). His first picture as director was The Arcadians (1927). In 1929 he and Balcon worked together again on a talkie remake of Woman to Woman for Balcon's company, Gainsborough Pictures. This time, Saville directed it.

From 1931, as Gainsborough Pictures and the Gaumont British Picture Corporation joined forces, Saville produced a string of comedies, musicals and dramas for Gainsborough and Gaumont-British, including the popular Jessie Matthews pictures. In 1937, he left to set up his own production company, Victor Saville Productions, and made three pictures for Alexander Korda's London Films at Denham studios.

As an independent producer he had purchased the film rights to A. J. Cronin's novel The Citadel. He was persuaded to sell them to Metro-Goldwyn-Mayer in return for the chance to produce the film and another big-budget adaptation, Goodbye Mr Chips (1939). Both films starred Robert Donat and were a great success in the US, as well as in Britain, providing Saville with a passport to Hollywood.

When the war broke out in 1939, Saville was in America and was advised to remain there. He produced pictures in support of the war effort, such as The Mortal Storm (1940) and Forever and a Day (1943) (in which he worked for the last time with his former star, Jessie Matthews), and in 1945 Tonight and Every Night, based on the history of the Windmill Theatre in London.

After the war, Saville continued directing films for MGM, but eventually returned to Britain. Saville acquired production rights for Mickey Spillane's Mike Hammer mysteries and produced a few features under the Parklane Pictures banner, though Spillane thought he was interested in doing so only to acquire the money to produce The Silver Chalice. Saville produced two final films in the 1960s, The Greengage Summer (1961), adapted from the novel of the same name, and Mix Me a Person (1962).

== Selected filmography ==
Year	Film	Director	Producer
1927	A Woman in Pawn		Yes
1927	The Glad Eye		Yes
1927	Roses of Picardy		Yes
1927	The Arcadians	Yes	Yes
1927	The Flight Commander		Yes
1928	Tesha	Yes	Yes
1929	Kitty	Yes	
1929	Woman to Woman	Yes	Yes
1930	The W Plan	Yes	Yes
1930	A Warm Corner	Yes	
1931	The Sport of Kings	Yes	Yes
1931	Sunshine Susie	Yes	
1931	Michael and Mary	Yes	
1931	Hindle Wakes	Yes	
1932	Love on Wheels	Yes	
1932	The Faithful Heart	Yes	
1933	The Good Companions	Yes	
1933	I Was a Spy	Yes	
1933	Friday the Thirteenth	Yes	
1934	Evergreen	Yes	
1934	Evensong	Yes	
1934	The Iron Duke	Yes	
1935	First a Girl	Yes	
1935	The Dictator	Yes	
1937	Dark Journey	Yes	Yes
1937	Storm in a Teacup	Yes	Yes
1938	The Citadel		Yes
1938	South Riding	Yes	Yes
1939	Goodbye, Mr. Chips		Yes
1940	Bitter Sweet		Yes
1941	A Woman's Face		Yes
1943	Above Suspicion		Yes
1943	Forever and a Day	Yes	Yes
1945	Tonight and Every Night	Yes	Yes
1946	The Green Years	Yes	
1947	Green Dolphin Street	Yes	
1949	Conspirator	Yes	
1950	Kim	Yes	
1951	Calling Bulldog Drummond	Yes	
1952	24 Hours of a Woman's Life	Yes	
1953	I, the Jury		Yes
1954	The Long Wait	Yes	
1954	The Silver Chalice	Yes	Yes
1955	Kiss Me Deadly		Yes
1957	My Gun Is Quick	Yes	Yes
