= Harold Huth =

British actor and film producer (1892–1967)

- in A Honeymoon Adventure (1931)
- Born: 20 January 1892; Huddersfield, West Riding of Yorkshire, England
- Died: 26 October 1967 (aged 75); London, England
- Years active: 1928–1961

Harold Huth (20 January 1892 – 26 October 1967) was a British actor, film director and producer.

== Biography ==
=== Early life ===
He was born in Huddersfield, Yorkshire, in 1892. He was a nephew of Eva Moore and a cousin of the actor Roland Pertwee.

For the first eighteen years of his professional life, Huth worked in the motor business.

=== Family ===
Huth married Bridget Nickols and they had two daughters, Angela, who became a writer, and Patricia.

=== Actor ===
Huth made his screen debut as an actor in the 1927 film One of the Best, directed by T. Hayes Hunter at Gainsborough Pictures. He got the role in part due to the connections of Pertwee.

Huth followed it up with the role of Captain Nolan in the film Balaclava about the Charge of the Light Brigade.

Huth went on to have roles in A South Sea Bubble (1928) with Ivor Novello, directed by Hunter; The Triumph of the Scarlet Pimpernel (1928) with Matheson Lang, playing Louis Antoine de Saint-Just; and The Silver King (1929), directed by Hunter, with Percy Marmont and Chili Bouchier.

Huth made his stage acting debut aged 36 on stage in The Truth Game with Ivor Novello. Raymond Massey then cast him opposite Fay Compton in Dishonored Lady.

Huth had the male lead in Downstream (1929) opposite Chili Bouchier, directed by Giuseppe Guarino. Huth made a third film with Bouchier, City of Play (1929).

Huth had roles in Leave It to Me (1930); An Obvious Situation (1930), directed by Guarino; Guilt (1931), directed by Reginald Fogwell; and Bracelets (1931).

Huth starred in The Outsider (1930) on stage. Edgar Wallace wrote the play Smoky Cell (1931) for Huth.

He had the lead in The Outsider (1931), alongside Joan Barry, receiving much acclaim.

He had a key support part in Down River (1931) with Charles Laughton.

Huth's first screenplay credit was in Madame Guillotine (1931), starring Madeleine Carroll, and directed by Fogwell.

Huth acted in A Honeymoon Adventure (1931); Adventure (1931); Aren't We All? (1932) with Gertrude Lawrence; and The First Mrs. Fraser (1932).

He had the lead in The Flying Squad (1932); Sally Bishop (1932), directed by Hunter; and The World, the Flesh, the Devil (1932). Huth had support parts in Rome Express (1932); Discord (1932); My Lucky Star (1933), with Florence Desmond; The Ghoul (1933), with Boris Karloff and directed by Hunter; and The Camels Are Coming (1934) with Jack Hulbert.

Huth quit acting to become head of casting for Gaumont British. He returned to acting briefly with a small role in Take My Tip (1937) with Hulbert.

=== Director and Producer ===
Huth directed his first film, Hell's Cargo (1939), for Associated British Picture Corporation. He followed it with Bulldog Sees It Through (1940) starring Jack Buchanan, and East of Piccadilly (1941).

Huth also moved into producing with Busman's Honeymoon (1940), shot in Britain for MGM starring Robert Montgomery.

He worked as producer on "Pimpernel" Smith (1941) for Leslie Howard and over at British Mercury he co-directed Breach of Promise (1942). Huth returned to acting in This Was Paris (1942) and MGM got him to produce another in England, The Adventures of Tartu (1943).

=== Gainsborough Pictures ===
Huth joined Gainsborough Pictures, for whom he produced a melodrama, Love Story (1944), with Margaret Lockwood, Stewart Granger and Patricia Roc; it was a huge commercial success. Also popular were They Were Sisters (1945), with James Mason and Caravan (1946) with Granger. Huth's last film for Gainsborough as producer, The Root of All Evil (1947), with Phyllis Calvert, was less successful.

=== Independent producer ===
Huth's success at Gainsborough saw him receive an offer to set up his own company, Harold Huth Productions with John Corfield. He produced The White Unicorn (1947) with fellow Gainsborough alumni Lockwood and Bernard Knowles and produced and directed Nightbeat (1947).

Huth and Corfeld then helped set up Burnham Productions where Huth produced and directedMy Sister and I (1948), with Sally Ann Howes, and Look Before You Love (1948) with Margaret Lockwood.

=== Later career ===
Huth produced Blackmailed (1951), directed by Marc Allégret, in which he also had a small role. He also appeared in Sing Along with Me (1952).

Huth directed for television, notably Douglas Fairbanks Presents (1953–57). He and Fairbanks produced Police Dog (1955) and The Hostage (1956); Huth directed the latter.

Huth went to work as an associate producer at Warwick Films for Irwin Allen and Albert Broccoli, helping make The Man Inside (1958), Idol on Parade (1959), The Bandit of Zhobe (1959), Jazz Boat (1960), The Trials of Oscar Wilde (1960) and In the Nick (1961). He was credited as a writer on The Hellions (1961). He retired in 1961. He and Peter Finch did discuss making a film about Oliver Cromwell but it was not made.

Huth died in 1967 in London.

== Selected filmography ==
=== Actor ===
- One of the Best (1927) - Adjutant
- Balaclava (1928) - Capt. Nolan, Adjutant
- A South Sea Bubble (1928) - Pirate
- The Triumph of the Scarlet Pimpernel (1928) - St. Just
- Sir or Madam (1928)
- The Silver King (1929) - Geoffrey Ware
- Downstream (1929) - Peter Carras
- City of Play (1929) - Arezzi
- Leave It to Me (1930, Short) - Slade
- An Obvious Situation (1930) - Gustave
- Guilt (1931) - Tony Carleton
- Bracelets (1931) - Maurice Dupont
- The Outsider (1931) - Anton Ragatzy
- Down River (1931) - John Durham
- A Honeymoon Adventure (1931) - Walter Creason
- Adventure (1931)
- Aren't We All? (1932) - Karl Van der Hyde
- The First Mrs. Fraser (1932) - Mario
- The Flying Squad (1932) - Mark McGill
- Sally Bishop (1932) - John Traill
- Rome Express (1932) - George Grant
- The World, the Flesh, the Devil (1932) - Nicholas Brophy
- Discord (1933) - Lord Quilhampton
- My Lucky Star (1933) - Hero
- The Ghoul (1933) - Aga Ben Dragore
- The Camels Are Coming (1934) - Dr. Zhiga
- Take My Tip (1937) - Buchan
- This Was Paris (1942) - Count Raul De La Vague
- Blackmailed (1951) - Hugh Sainsbury
- Sing Along with Me (1952) - (final film role)

=== Director ===
- Hell's Cargo (1939)
- Bulldog Sees It Through (1940)
- East of Piccadilly (1941)
- Breach of Promise (1942)
- They Were Sisters (1945)
- Night Beat (1947)
- My Sister and I (1948)
- Look Before You Love (1948)
- The Hostage (1956)

=== Producer ===
- Busman's Honeymoon (1940)
- "Pimpernel" Smith (1941)
- The Adventures of Tartu (1943)
- Love Story (1944)
- They Were Sisters (1945)
- Caravan (1946)
- The Root of All Evil (1947)
- The White Unicorn (1947)
- Night Beat (1947)
- My Sister and I (1948)
- Look Before You Love (1948)
- Blackmailed (1951)
- Police Dog (1955)
- The Man Inside (1958)
- Idol on Parade (1959)
- The Bandit of Zhobe (1959)
- Jazz Boat (1960)
- The Trials of Oscar Wilde (1960)
- In the Nick (1960)
- The Hellions (1961)

=== Screenwriter ===
- Madame Guillotine (1931)
- The Hellions (1961)
