= Bedrock (1930 film) =

1930 British film by Carlyle Blackwell

- Sunday Wilshin, Carlyle Blackwell and Jane Baxter in the film.
- Directed by: Carlyle Blackwell
- Written by: Noel Shannon; Michael Arabian
- Produced by: Carlyle Blackwell
- Starring: Carlyle Blackwell; Alexander Field; Sunday Wilshin
- Production company: Piccadilly Productions
- Release date: 1930
- Running time: 39 minutes
- Country: United Kingdom
- Language: English

Bedrock is a 1930 British short film directed by Carlyle Blackwell and starring Blackwell, Alexander Field and Sunday Wilshin. It was written by Noel Shannon and Michael Arabian, and made as a quota quickie.

== Preservation status ==
The British Film Institute National Archive holds a collection of ephemera and stills but no film or video materials.

== Plot ==
A man returns to Britain from Canada to seek revenge on the couple who had previously robbed him. He fails, and returns to Canada, sadder and wiser.

== Cast ==
- Carlyle Blackwell as Jim Parke
- Alexander Field as Jonas
- Sunday Wilshin as Bella
- Wilfrid Fletcher as Andrew
- Barbara Gott as proprietress
- Jane Baxter as Rosie

== Reception ==
Film Weekly wrote: "This film unfortunately fails to be convincing. Intended to be a powerful story of intended revenge thwarted by circumstances (in the shape of a baby's garment), it misses fire through over-emphasis and over-acting. The small parts are well played, but in the main this film lacks entertainment value."
