= Blackmailed (1951 film) =

1951 British film by Marc Allégret

- Directed by: Marc Allégret
- Written by: Hugh Mills; Roger Vadim
- Based on: Mrs. Christopher by Elizabeth Myers
- Produced by: Harold Huth; Norman Spencer
- Starring: Mai Zetterling; Dirk Bogarde; Fay Compton; Robert Flemyng
- Cinematography: George Stretton
- Edited by: John Shirley
- Music by: John Wooldridge
- Production company: Harold Huth Productions
- Distributed by: General Film Distributors
- Release date: 30 January 1951
- Running time: 85 minutes
- Country: United Kingdom
- Language: English

Blackmailed is a 1951 British noir thriller film directed by Marc Allégret and starring Mai Zetterling, Dirk Bogarde, Fay Compton and Robert Flemyng. It was adapted by Hugh Mills and Roger Vadim from the 1946 novel Mrs Christopher by Elizabeth Myers.

== Plot ==
When blackmailer Mr Sine is murdered by Mrs Christopher, several people who witnessed the crime agree to keep quiet. However the murder was also seen by a young artist and army deserter, Stephen Mundy, also one of the blackmailer's victims.

== Cast ==
- Mai Zetterling as Carol Edwards
- Dirk Bogarde as Stephen Mundy
- Fay Compton as Mrs Christopher
- Robert Flemyng as Doctor Freeman
- Michael Gough as Maurice Edwards
- James Robertson Justice as Mr Sine
- Joan Rice as Alma
- Harold Huth as Hugh Sainsbury
- Wilfrid Hyde-White as Lord Dearsley
- Nora Gordon as Housekeeper
- Cyril Chamberlain as police constable
- Charles Saynor as police constable
- Derrick Penley as Patrick
- Peter Owen as chief printer
- Dennis Brian as chief printer
- Arthur Hambling as Inspector Canin
- Shirley Wright as Mary
- Bruce Seton as Superintendent Crowe
- Marianne Stone as Maggie
- Helen Goss as matron
- Constance Smith as nurse Anne
- Edie Martin as Mrs. Porritt
- John Horsley as Maggie's doctor
- Ballard Berkeley as Dr. McCormick

== Production ==
The film was shot at Pinewood Studios outside London, with the working title Mrs Christopher. Sets were designed by the art director J. Elder Wills.

== Reception ==
The Monthly Film Bulletin wrote: "The story itself would be quite sufficient for an entertaining minor film, but in this instance the handling has failed. Most of the dialogue is trite and conventional, and the direction does nothing to pull the film together. ... Little care has been taken with the sets, obviously stagey, and the direction is slipshod, essaying the odd trick shot, such as the falling of the body from the roof, in a somewhat crude attempt to brighten the surface."

Picturegoer wrote: "It's a slow and jumbled production in which the main idea – a woman who has committed a murder can't decide whether or not to give herself up because she might involve others – is submerged in a number of trite situations, with unconvincing dialogue and loose direction."

== Bibliography ==
- Grant, John. A Comprehensive Encyclopedia of Film Noir: The Essential Reference Guide. Rowman & Littlefield, 2023.
- Hinxman, Margaret & D'Arcy, Susan. The Films of Dirk Bogarde. Literary Services and Production, 1974
