= The Happy Ending (play) =

- Original language: English
- Written by: Ian Hay
- Genre: Drama

Premiere
- Date: 20 November 1922
- Place: Devonshire Park, Eastbourne

The Happy Ending is a 1922 play by the British writer Ian Hay. A man believed to have died a heroic wartime death returns home alive, and blackmails his wife into supplying him with money. Before the truth is revealed to their children, he redeems himself by a genuinely brave death.

It premiered at Devonshire Park in Eastbourne before beginning its run in the West End. It ran for 43 performances at St James's Theatre between 30 November 1922 and 13 January 1923. The cast included Adele Dixon, Robert Loraine and Jean Cadell, Ethel Irving and Miles Malleson.

== Adaptations ==
The story has been made into films twice. In 1925 Gaumont British adapted it as a silent film The Happy Ending starring Fay Compton and Jack Buchanan. Six years later the same studio remade it as a sound film The Happy Ending with Cyril Raymond and Anne Grey.

== Bibliography ==
- Goble, Alan. The Complete Index to Literary Sources in Film. Walter de Gruyter, 1999.
- Wearing, J. P. The London Stage 1920-1929: A Calendar of Productions, Performers, and Personnel. Rowman & Littlefield, 2014.
