= Helen Goss =

British actress (1903–1985)

- 1936 Spotlight photo
- Born: 15 October 1903; London, England
- Died: 1985 (aged 81–82); Essex, England
- Other name: Helen Margaret Goss
- Occupation: Actress
- Years active: 1928–1970

Helen Goss (15 October 1903 – 1985) was a British stage, television and film actress. She was also a drama teacher and for a period was responsible for admissions to the Rank Charm School.

== Filmography ==
Year	Title	Role	Notes
1932	Bachelor's Baby	Minor Role	Uncredited
1934	Important People	Beryl Cardew	
1936	Hail and Farewell		Uncredited
1937	The Reverse Be My Lot	Helen	
1943	Dear Octopus		Uncredited
1944	Fanny by Gaslight	Polly	Uncredited
1945	A Place of One's Own	Barmaid	
1945	They Were Sisters	Webster	
1945	The Wicked Lady	Mistress Betsy	
1945	Pink String and Sealing Wax	Maudie	
1947	The Mark of Cain	Lizzie Burt	
1948	My Sister and I	Mrs. Pomfret	
1948	The Weaker Sex		Uncredited
1949	Trottie True	Mrs. Bellaire	Uncredited
1950	Stage Fright	Miss Tippett	Uncredited
1950	The Woman in Question	Neighbour	Uncredited
1950	The Clouded Yellow	Woman Shopkeeper	Uncredited
1951	Blackmailed	Matron	
1951	Cheer the Brave		
1951	Honeymoon Deferred	Minor Role	
1951	Appointment with Venus	Provost's Wife	
1952	Something Money Can't Buy	Mrs. Lindstrom	
1952	The Planter's Wife	Eleanor Bushell	Uncredited
1952	The Pickwick Papers		Uncredited
1953	The Sword and the Rose	Princess Claude	
1954	The Stranger's Hand	Minor Role	Uncredited
1954	Dance, Little Lady	Neighbour	
1955	Three Cornered Fate		
1957	Action of the Tiger	Farmer's Wife	
1958	Gideon's Day	Woman Employer	Uncredited
1958	Carry On Sergeant	Mary's Mum	Uncredited
1958	The Solitary Child		
1959	The Hound of the Baskervilles	Mrs. Barrymore	
1960	Moment of Danger	Lady Middleburgh	Uncredited
1960	The Two Faces of Dr. Jekyll	Nanny	Uncredited
1966	The Uncle	Helen	
1966	The Spy with a Cold Nose	Lady In Lift	Uncredited
1967	Half a Sixpence	Dowager	
1970	Jane Eyre	Lady Lynn	TV movie
