= Seamark (disambiguation) =

Seamark is a maritime navigation aid.

It may also refer to:

- Seamark Group, a food processing company
- Seamark (writer), the pen name of a British writer
