= One of the Best =

One of the Best may refer to:

- One of the Best (film), a 1927 British film directed by T. Hayes Hunter
- One of the Best (car), a historic British-made car
