= The Darling of His Concierge =

The Darling of His Concierge may refer to:

- The Darling of His Concierge (1934 film), a French comedy film
- The Darling of His Concierge (1951 film), a French comedy film
