= Accomplice (disambiguation) =

An accomplice is a person who participates in a crime but takes no part in the criminal offense.

Accomplice(s) or The Accomplice(s) may also refer to:

== Film ==
- Accomplice (film), a 1946 American film noir
- The Accomplice (1917 film), an American silent drama film
- The Accomplice (1932 film), a French crime film
- Accomplices (film), a 2009 Franco-Swiss crime thriller

== Television ==
- The Accomplice (TV series), a 2020 Iranian drama series
- "The Accomplice" (The O.C.), a 2005 episode
- "The Accomplice" (The Zeta Project), a 2001 episode

== Other uses ==
- The Accomplices, a 2007 play by Bernard Weintraub
- The Accomplices, a defunct website operated by a partnership including Entropy magazine

== See also ==
- "Complice" ("Accomplice"), a 2008 song by Miodio
