= Arms and the Man (disambiguation) =

Arms and the Man is an 1894 play by George Bernard Shaw.

Arms and the Man may also refer to:

- Arms and the Man (1932 film), adaptation by Cecil Lewis
- Arms and the Man (1958 film), adaptation by Franz Peter Wirth
- Arms and the Man (magazine), title of American Rifleman from 1906 to 1923
