= Sally Bishop (1932 film) =

1932 film

- Harold Huth and Joan Barry in the film
- Directed by: T. Hayes Hunter
- Written by: John Drinkwater; E. Temple Thurston (novel); Gilbert Wakefield
- Produced by: S.W. Smith
- Starring: Joan Barry; Harold Huth; Isabel Jeans; Benita Hume
- Cinematography: Alex Bryce
- Edited by: Arthur Tavares
- Production company: British Lion
- Distributed by: British Lion
- Release date: 18 October 1932
- Running time: 80 minutes
- Country: United Kingdom
- Language: English

Sally Bishop is a 1932 British romantic drama film directed by T. Hayes Hunter and starring Joan Barry, Harold Huth and Isabel Jeans. It was written by John Drinkwater and Gilbert Wakefield, adapted from the 1910 novel Sally Bishop, a Romance by E. Temple Thurston. The novel had twice previously been adapted as a silent film, in 1916 and 1924.

== Preservation status ==
The British Film Institute National Archive holds a collection of ephemera and stills but no film or video materials.

== Plot ==
Typist Sally Bishop meets wealthy John Traill, and decides to live with him despite his avowed intention never to marry. Three years later Traill becomes engaged to a friend of his sister, and leaves Sally. Heartbroken, Sally flees to the countryside where she meets Bart, a farmer, who proposes to her. While she considers his offer, Traill makes a reappearance. He confesses his previous stupidity, and his true love for her, and she accepts his offer of marriage.

== Cast ==
- Joan Barry as Sally Bishop
- Harold Huth as John Traill
- Isabel Jeans as Dolly Durlacher
- Benita Hume as Evelyn Standish
- Kay Hammond as Janet Hallar
- Emlyn Williams as Arthur Montague
- Anthony Bushell as Bart
- Annie Esmond as landlady
- Diana Churchill as typist

== Production ==
The film was made at Beaconsfield Studios.

== Reception ==
Film Weekly wrote: "Good acting, fine settings, and some excellent phetography lavished on an old-fahioned unreal story of a typist's affair with a rich man. Fair entertainment only."

Kine Weekly wrote: "An adaptation of E. Temple Thurston's novel by John Drinkwater has obvious box-office potentialities, especially as the cast is a popular one. Development is, however, very slow, and the plot dealing with a man who marries the woman he has lived with and discarded extremely slight. ... T. Hayes Hunter's direction is workmanlike and polished in technical detail, but on the whole very pedestrian. The story is so slight that it needed crisper action, by-play and dialogue really to capture and hold the attention."

Picturegoer wrote: "Although the technical side of the production is polished this adaptation of a popular novel is very slow and pedantic in treatment. ... It needed crisper dialogue, more subtle by-play, and more incisive characterisation to hold the attention, especially as none of the characters enlist one's sympathy to any extent. The best performance is given by Emlyn Williams in the very small role of a bank clerk."

Picture Show wrote: "Joan Barry is Sally Bishop and Harold Huth, John Traill, the rich lover. Both are splendid and give such fine performances that one forgets certain faults in the way the story is revealed. A very strong supporting cast includes Emlyn Williams, Isabel Jeans and Kay Hammond. The production on the whole is highly satisfactory. A British film that is a credit to all concerned in it."

Variety wrote: "'Without the sounding of any fanfare or undue blowing of trumpets in the form of preliminary advertising or publicity, British Lion has turned out a program feature that any Hollywood studio would be glad to claim for its own. The screen adaptation is the simplest sort of direct film narration, uninterrupted by counter-plots and progressing to its ultimate conclusion with a directness that makes for simplicity. Some in the trade seemed to think there was too much talk and insufficient action. This reviewer believes the scenario was made designedly so. With such a start the director had a relatively easy task to put the 100% cast through the paces necessary for the picturization. This is not to be construed as an uncomplimentary comment on T. Hayes Hunter's workmanlike job as a director. The lighting and recording are all on a par with the other departments that go to make up a high grade talker. Sally Bishop is a long step forward in the proper direction for the making of motion pictures in England."
