= Father and Son (1934 film) =

- Esmond Knight and Daphne Courtney in the film
- Directed by: Monty Banks
- Written by: Randall Faye; Ben Ames Williams (story)
- Produced by: Irving Asher
- Starring: Edmund Gwenn; Esmond Knight; James Finlayson
- Cinematography: Basil Emmott
- Production company: Warner Brothers
- Distributed by: Warner Brothers
- Release date: 13 September 1934
- Running time: 48 minutes
- Country: United Kingdom
- Language: English

Father and Son is a lost 1934 British crime film directed by Monty Banks and starring Edmund Gwenn, Esmond Knight and James Finlayson. It was written by Randall Faye from the story "Barber John's Boy" by Ben Ames Williams, and made at Teddington Studios as a quota quickie. The same story had also been adapted for the 1930 American film Man to Man.

== Preservation status ==
The British Film Institute has classed Father and Son as a lost film. Its National Archive holds a collection of stills but no film or video materials.

== Plot ==
Released from prison after serving a 15-year sentence for manslaughter, John Bolton returns home. When he rescues a boy from drowning and is given strong drink, his son Michael mistakenly takes this as drunkenness. Discovering the truth, Michael is full of shame. Subsequently when John is suspected of a robbery, Michael accepts the blame, but John forces the real criminal to confess.

== Cast ==
- Edmund Gwenn as John Bolton
- Esmond Knight as Michael Bolton
- James Finlayson as Bildad
- Roland Culver as Vincent
- Charles Carson as Colin Bolton
- Daphne Courtney as Emily Yates
- O. B. Clarence as Tom Yates
- Margaret Yarde as Victoria

== Reception ==
The Daily Film Renter wrote: "Development along customary lines, story taking familiar route to reconciliation. Played against suburban backgrounds, film moves at rather slow pace, but is leavened by voluble cockney servant. Adequate direction, sensitive portrayal by Edmund Gwenn, with fair support. Quota fare for the unexacting, with pronounced sentimental appeal."

Kine Weekly wrote: "Elementary emotional drama, with a trite story and banal dialogue. The development is so obvious that interest ceases to exist shortly after the film opens; the presentation is meagre. A film which has little to recommend it apart from its accommodating length, quota angle, and possible star values. ... Edmund Gwenn does his best to make something of the of John Bolton, but not even his stage and screen experience can bring life to the part. Esmond Knight is weak as the snobbish Michael, and Daphne Courtney is Borie as the heroine. This drama is so obviously manufactured that it makes no appeal to the emotions. Every stage in the development is easily anticipated, and the cast is not strong enough to conceal its thematic weaknesses. The direction, too, is amateurish."

Picturegoer wrote: "Edmond Gwenn struggles to make something of the role of an ex-convict whose past blackens him in the eyes of his son, who eventually learns to respect and love him, but does not succeed in making it life-like. Esmond Knight is weak as the snobbish son who is saved from a charge of theft by his father taking the blame, while Daphne Courtney is colourless as the heroine." It is a very mechanical affair, too blatantly obvious to hold any real interest."
