= Daphne Courtney =

South African actress (born 1916)

- Courtney in La battalion du ciel (1947)
- Born: Daphne R. Courtenay-Hicks; 28 June 1916; Pretoria, South Africa
- Years active: 1931–1947
- Spouse(s): Hugh McDermott (m. 1936; div. 1950)

Daphne R. Courtenay-Hicks (born 28 June 1916, date of death unknown), better known as Daphne Courtney, was a South African actress, who performed in B-movie British "quota quickies" during the 1930s and 1940s. She had a supporting role in at least one French film, Le battalion du ciel, directed by Alexander Esway. Courtney also had a stage career, and stage credits include the first British performance of The Man Who Came to Dinner (17 November 1941) – pre-dating its London debut by three weeks – in which she appeared with her husband the Scottish actor Hugh McDermott.

== Selected filmography ==
- The Happy Ending (1931)
- A Political Party (1934)
- Father and Son (1934)
- Oh, Daddy! (1935)
- Murder by Rope (1936)
- The Captain's Table (1936)
- Bed and Breakfast (1938)
- They Are Not Angels (1947)
- Le battalion de ciel (1947)

== Stage credits ==
- The Women (The Strand Theatre, 1940)
- The Man Who Came to Dinner (Theatre Royal, Birmingham, 1941)
- Matinée Idylls (Theatre Royal Haymarket, 1942)
- They Also Serve (Theatre Royal, Glasgow, 1944)

== See also ==
- British film
