= The Bachelor's Club (1921 film) =

1921 British film by A. V. Bramble

- Directed by: A. V. Bramble
- Written by: Israel Zangwill (novel); Eliot Stannard
- Starring: Ben Field; Ernest Thesiger; Mary Brough; Sydney Fairbrother
- Production company: Ideal Film Company
- Distributed by: Ideal Film Company
- Release date: 1921
- Country: United Kingdom
- Language: English

The Bachelor's Club is a 1921 British silent comedy film directed by A. V. Bramble, starring Ben Field, Ernest Thesiger and Mary Brough, and based on the 1891 novel The Bachelor's Club by Israel Zangwill.

== Cast ==
- Ben Field as Peter Parker
- Ernest Thesiger as Israfel Mondego
- Mary Brough as Mrs. Parker
- Sydney Fairbrother as Tabitha
- Arthur Pusey as Paul Dickray
- Margot Drake as Jenny Halby
- James Lindsay as Eliot Dickray
- Sidney Paxton as Caleb Twinkletop
- A.G. Poulton as Edward Halby
- Arthur Cleave as Warlock Combs
- Dora Lennox as Israfel's Sweetheart
- Jack Denton as Mandeville Brown
- Alice De Winton as Dowager
