= The Happy Ending (1925 film) =

1925 film

- Directed by: George A. Cooper
- Written by: P.L. Mannock
- Based on: The Happy Ending; 1922 play by Ian Hay
- Produced by: George A. Cooper
- Starring: Fay Compton; Jack Buchanan; Joan Barry
- Cinematography: William Shenton
- Production company: Gaumont British Picture Corporation
- Distributed by: Gaumont British Distributors
- Release date: January 1925
- Running time: 98 minutes
- Country: United Kingdom
- Languages: Silent; English intertitles

The Happy Ending is a 1925 British silent drama film directed by George A. Cooper and starring Fay Compton, Jack Buchanan and Joan Barry. It was based on a play by Ian Hay. Its plot concerns a father who deserted his family some years before returning home only to find his wife has told his children and neighbours that he died as a hero when he abandoned them. A sound film of the same play The Happy Ending (also featuring Benita Hume) was made in 1931.

== Cast ==
- Fay Compton as Mildred Craddock
- Jack Buchanan as Captain Dale Conway
- Joan Barry as Molly Craddock
- Jack Hobbs as Denis Craddock
- Gladys Jennings as Joan Craddock
- Eric Lewis as Sir Anthony Fenwick
- Donald Searle as Harold Bagby
- Drusilla Wills as Laura Meakin
- Pat Doyle as The Maid
- A.G. Poulton as Mr. Moon
- Benita Hume as Miss Moon
- Doris Mansell as Phyllis Harding
