= Smoky Cell =

1930 play

- Written by: Edgar Wallace
- Original language: English
- Genre: Crime Thriller
- Setting: United States

Premiere
- Date premiered: 16 December 1930
- Place premiered: Wyndham's Theatre, London

Smoky Cell is a thriller play by the British writer Edgar Wallace first staged in 1930. In America a group of detectives hunt down a notorious racketeer.

It ran for 103 performances at Wyndham's Theatre in the West End from 16 December 1930 to 14 March 1931. The original cast included Finlay Currie, Percy Parsons, Charles Farrell, Harold Huth, Roy Emerton and James Carew, and was directed by Carol Reed. It marked Canadian actor Alexander Knox's London stage debut.

It was an inspired by a visit Wallace had recently made to the United States, which also led him to write his even more successful play On the Spot the same year. In 1935, following Wallace's death, his former assistant Robert Curtis wrote a novel of the same title based on the play.

== Bibliography ==
- Kabatchnik, Amnon. Blood on the Stage, 1975-2000: Milestone Plays of Crime, Mystery, and Detection : an Annotated Repertoire. Rowman & Littlefield, 2012.
- Wearing, J. P. The London Stage 1930–1939: A Calendar of Productions, Performers, and Personnel. Rowman & Littlefield, 2014.
