= Greek Street (film) =

1930 film

- U.S. theatrical release poster
- Directed by: Sinclair Hill
- Written by: Ralph Gilbert Bettison; Robert Stevenson
- Produced by: L'Estrange Fawcett
- Starring: Sari Maritza; William Freshman; Martin Lewis; Peter Haddon
- Cinematography: Percy Strong
- Music by: Stanelli; W.L. Trytel
- Production company: Golden Arrow Productions
- Distributed by: Gaumont British Distributors
- Release date: 1930
- Running time: 85 minutes
- Country: United Kingdom
- Language: English

Greek Street (U.S. title Latin Love) is a 1930 British musical film directed by Sinclair Hill and starring Sari Maritza, William Freshman and Martin Lewis. It was made by Gaumont British at their Lime Grove Studios in Shepherd's Bush. The film's sets were designed by Andrew Mazzei. The film takes its title from Greek Street in Central London.

== Plot ==
Riki, the young owner of the café Napoli in Soho, takes in homeless singer Anna, and as time passes, she becomes his star attraction. Riki and Anna fall in love, but trouble comes when producer Mansfield Yates features Anne in his fashionable nightclub the March Hare and tries to romance her. Sir George Ascot, a financial backer of Yates, intervenes and engineers the couple's reconciliation.

== Cast ==
- Sari Maritza as Anna
- William Freshman as Riki
- Martin Lewis as Mansfield Yates
- Bert Coote as Sir George Ascot
- Renee Clama as Lucia
- Bruce Winston as Max
- Peter Haddon as businessman
- Rex Maurice as businessman
- Stanelli as businessman
- Fanny Wright as wife
- Arthur Hambling as Alfie
- Andreas Malandrinos as Carlo
- Eric Pavitt as boy

== Reception ==
Film Weekly wrote: "This is neither a strong story nor an enterprisingly related one. There is a sentimental note running throughout the film which finds occasional expression in not very distinguished songs. As for the cast, Bert Coote gives the best performance as the very human Sir George. William Freshman acts well in a stereotyped kind of role. Sari Maritza shows some promise."

Kine Weekly wrote: "Simple romantic drama embellished with song and dance, which has a pseudo-Soho atmosphere which appears artificial, but is yet effective. Although a little scrappy in development, the picture, which is elaborately mounted, contains much which carries universal appeal."

The Daily Film Renter wrote: "Romantic and appealing story of girl singer and Italian café owner against backgrounds of London's bohemian and fashionable night life. Series of good characterisations and wide range of effective settings. ... Greek Street is undoubtedly a success, and the fact is largely due to Sinclair Hill's skilful handling of an exceptionally well-chosen cast."
