= A South Sea Bubble =

1928 film

- Directed by: T. Hayes Hunter
- Written by: Angus MacPhail; Alma Reville
- Based on: novel by Roland Pertwee
- Produced by: Michael Balcon; S.C. Balcon
- Starring: Ivor Novello; Benita Hume; Alma Taylor; Annette Benson
- Cinematography: James Wilson
- Production company: Gainsborough Pictures
- Distributed by: Woolf & Freedman Film Service
- Release date: July 1928
- Running time: 100 minutes
- Country: United Kingdom
- Languages: Silent; English intertitles

A South Sea Bubble is a 1928 British silent comedy adventure film directed by T. Hayes Hunter and starring Ivor Novello, Benita Hume and Alma Taylor. The screenplay concerns a group of adventurers who head to the Pacific Ocean to hunt for buried treasure. It was made at Islington Studios.

== Cast ==
- Ivor Novello as Vernon Winslow
- Benita Hume as Averil Rochester
- Alma Taylor as Mary Ottery
- Annette Benson as Lydia la Rue
- Sydney Seaward as William Carpenter
- S. J. Warmington as Frank Sullivan
- Ben Field as Isinglass
- Harold Huth as Pirate
- John F. Hamilton as Tony Gates
- Mary Dibley as Olive Barbary

== See also ==
- South Seas genre

== Bibliography ==
- Wood, Linda. British Films, 1927-1939. British Film Institute, 1986.
