= Bombay Mail (1934 film) =

1934 film by Edwin L. Marin

- Lobby card
- Directed by: Edwin L. Marin
- Screenplay by: Tom Reed
- Produced by: Carl Laemmle, Jr.
- Starring: Edmund Lowe; Ralph Forbes; Shirley Grey; Hedda Hopper; Onslow Stevens; Jameson Thomas
- Cinematography: Charles J. Stumar
- Edited by: Doris Drought
- Music by: Heinz Roemheld (Note: uncredited)
- Production company: Universal Pictures
- Distributed by: Universal Pictures
- Release date: January 6, 1934
- Running time: 70 minutes
- Country: United States
- Language: English

Bombay Mail is a 1934 American pre-Code drama film directed by Edwin L. Marin and written by Tom Reed. The film stars Edmund Lowe, Ralph Forbes, Shirley Grey, Hedda Hopper, Onslow Stevens, and Jameson Thomas. The film was released on January 6, 1934, by Universal Pictures. The film is based on the Lawrence Blochman novel of the same name which was originally published in 1933 in the pulp magazine Complete Stories.

According to Lal Chand Mehra, an Indian who acted in and advised numerous Hollywood films in the first half of the 20th century, the entire movie was filmed in elaborate sets. "it was necessary to build an entire Indian train —the ‘Imperial Indian Mail'—to construct several stations and to see that each and every character, from brahmins to untouchables, were correctly costumed and correctly dressed", he said in an interview in the Madera Tribune.

== Plot ==
The governor of Bengal is assassinated on the Bombay Mail somewhere between Calcutta and Bombay and it is up to Inspector Dyke to solve that murder as well as a couple of later murders. The cast of characters include the governor's wife, his two secretaries, a gambler, an entertainer who is not quite what she seems, a mineralogist on his way to claim a ruby field, a pickpocket, an anti-British agitator, and a cobra.

== Cast ==
- Edmund Lowe as Inspector Dyke
- Ralph Forbes as William Luke-Patson
- Shirley Grey as Beatrice Jones aka Sonia Smeganoff
- Hedda Hopper as Lady Daniels
- Onslow Stevens as John Hawley
- Jameson Thomas as Capt. Gerald Worthing
- Ferdinand Gottschalk as Governor Sir Anthony Daniels
- Tom Moore as Civil Surgeon
- John Wray as Giovanni Martini
- John Davidson as R. Xavier
- Georges Renavent as Dr. Maurice Lenoir
- Herbert Corthell as Edward J. Breeze
- Brandon Hurst as Pundit Garnath Chundra
- Walter Armitage as Maharajah of Zungore
- Garry Owen as Cuthbert Neal

== Reception ==
The New York Times called it "an agreeably effective little shiver item" that would keep its "audience in a state of confusion" with its plot twists and deaths. The Michigan Daily compared it unfavorably to Shanghai Express but without the presence of Marlene Dietrich and commented on the "unnatural settings" and "decidedly unlike a train interior", ending with an "it could be worse". Later reviewers are more favorable. Michael Pitt called it "unjustly overlooked today" and found it to be a "fast-paced" and entertaining. In particular, Pitt points to the performance of Lowe, calling it superb, and "one of his best starring efforts". Bernard Dick called it an early version of the "railway thriller" and that, even though Laemmle had made a B movie, it had class.

The film was banned by the British authorities in India and in Singapore. In India, because it showed the murder of a maharaja and in Singapore because it showed the killing of a government official. Two of Roemheld's scores from the film, "Shirley Theme #3" and "Bombay Station," were reused in the late 1930s by Universal Pictures in its Flash Gordon series.
