= L'Estrange Fawcett =

British screenwriter and film producer (1894–1961)

- Born: 1894; Southport, Lancashire; United Kingdom
- Died: 1961 (aged 66–67); London
- Other name: Arthur Wellesley L'Estrange Fawcett
- Occupations: Writer, Producer, Journalist

Arthur Wellesley L'Estrange Fawcett MC (1894 – 1961) was a British screenwriter and film producer, notable for his work at Gainsborough Pictures such as Bed and Breakfast (1930). A former journalist he was also a film critic writing the 1927 work Films: Facts and Forecasts (for which Charlie Chaplin provided a preface) and Writing for the Films in 1932.

He was a son of the Reverend Francis L'Estrange Fawcett and his wife Edith. He was an Exhibitioner of Corpus Christi College, Cambridge. Commissioned in the First World War, he served with the Gloucestershire Regiment and the Machine Gun Corps, and was awarded the Military Cross in 1917.

He married Cecilia Mary Herklots Jerwood (née Powles) in 1920; she was the widow of Major John Hugh Jerwood MC, and mother of John Jerwood. Arthur and Cecilia had two sons – Richard & Robin.

== Selected filmography ==
=== Writer ===
- Smashing Through (1928)
- High Treason (1929)
- The Night Porter (1930)

=== Producer ===
- The Great Game (1930)
- Greek Street (1930)
- Down River (1931)
- Bracelets (1931)
- No Lady (1931)
- The Happy Ending (1931)

== Bibliography ==
- Low, Rachael. Filmmaking in 1930s Britain. George Allen & Unwin, 1985.
- Marcus, Laura. The Tenth Muse: Writing about Cinema in the Modernist Period. Oxford University Press, 2007.
