= The Triumph of the Scarlet Pimpernel (film) =

1928 film

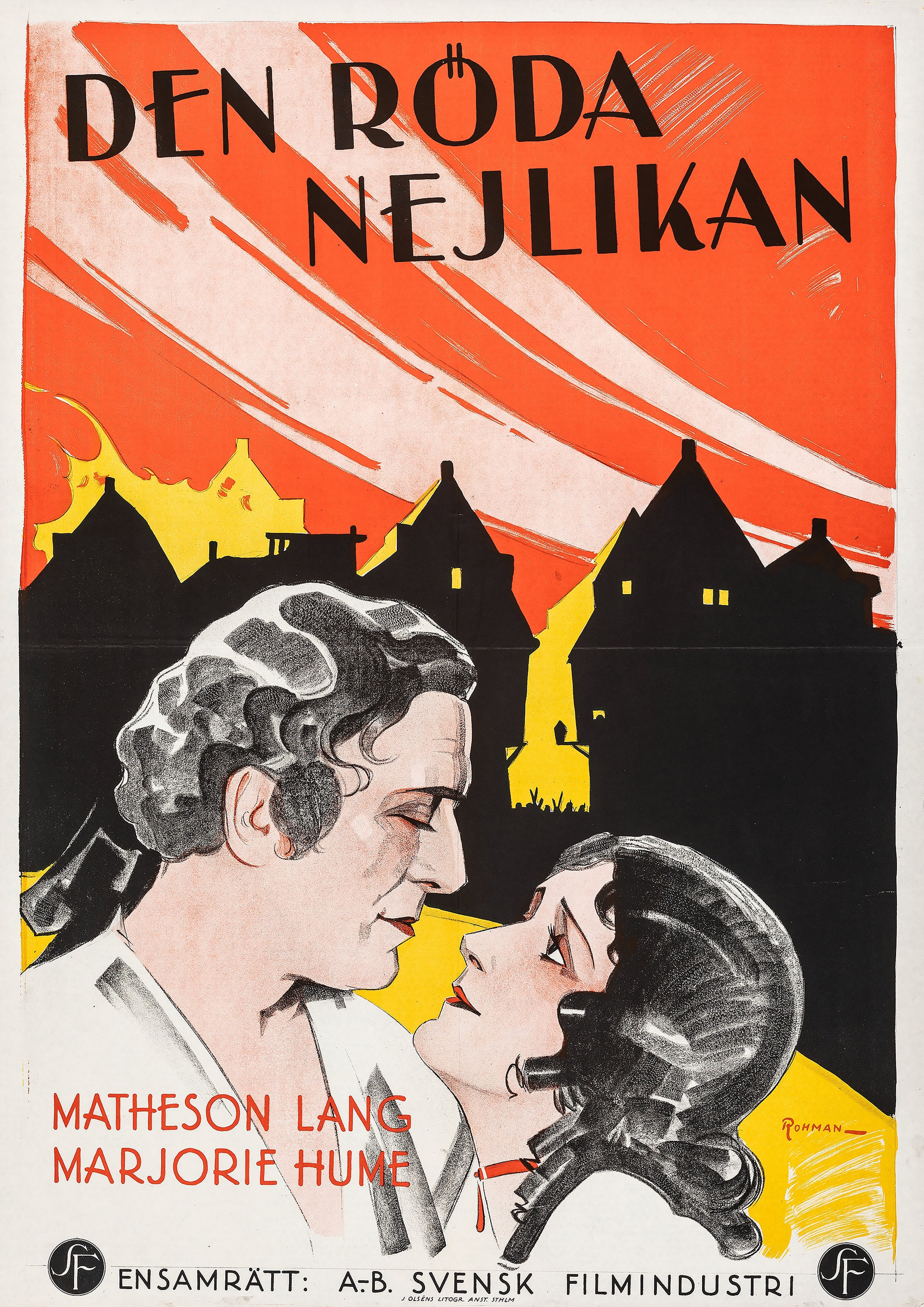
- Swedish theatrical poster
- Directed by: T. Hayes Hunter
- Written by: Emmuska Orczy (novel)
- Starring: Matheson Lang; Juliette Compton; Nelson Keys; Marjorie Hume
- Cinematography: William Shenton
- Production company: British & Dominions Film Corporation
- Distributed by: Woolf & Freedman Film Service
- Release date: 5 November 1928
- Running time: 7,946 feet
- Country: United Kingdom
- Languages: Silent; English intertitles

The Triumph of the Scarlet Pimpernel is a 1928 British silent costume drama film directed by T. Hayes Hunter and starring Matheson Lang, Juliette Compton and Nelson Keys. It was based on the 1922 novel The Triumph of the Scarlet Pimpernel by Baroness Emma Orczy. It was made at Cricklewood Studios, with art direction by Clifford Pember.

Madeleine Carroll was meant to play Lady Blakeney but filming was delayed and proved unavailable.

== Cast ==
- Matheson Lang as Sir Percy Blakeney
- Juliette Compton as Theresa Cabbarrus
- Nelson Keys as Robespierre
- Marjorie Hume as Lady Blakeney
- Haddon Mason as Tallien
- Douglas Payne as Rateau
- Harold Huth as St. Just

== Bibliography ==
- Low, Rachael. History of the British Film, 1918-1929. George Allen & Unwin, 1971.
