= The Happy Ending (1931 film) =

1931 film

- Theatrical release poster
- Directed by: Millard Webb
- Written by: Sidney Gilliat; H. Fowler Mear
- Based on: The Happy Ending 1922 play by Ian Hay
- Produced by: L'Estrange Fawcett
- Starring: George Barraud; Daphne Courtney; Alfred Drayton
- Cinematography: Percy Strong
- Edited by: R. E. Dearing
- Production company: Gaumont British Picture Corporation
- Distributed by: Gaumont British Distributors
- Release date: October 1931
- Running time: 72 minutes
- Country: United Kingdom
- Language: English

The Happy Ending is a 1931 British drama film directed by Millard Webb and starring George Barraud, Daphne Courtney and Alfred Drayton. It was written by Sidney Gilliat and H. Fowler Mear based on the 1922 play of the same title by Ian Hay. A silent film based on the play was made in 1925.

== Plot ==
After abandoning his family some years previously, Dennis Craddock returns home to discover that his wife Mollie has told his children and neighbours that after he left them he died as a hero.

== Cast ==
- George Barraud as Dennis Craddock
- Daphne Courtney as Mollie Craddock
- Alfred Drayton as life of the party
- Anne Grey as Mildred Craddock
- Benita Hume as Yvonne
- Cyril Raymond as Anthony Fenwick
- Irene Russell as wife
- Dolores Judson as passenger

== Production ==
The film was made at Lime Grove Studios with sets were designed by Andrew Mazzei.

== Reception ==
Kine Weekly wrote: "The treatment of this drama is spectacular but unimaginative, and, as a result of the story, which is based upon Ian Hay's book, misses a good deal of the author's charm, sentiment and humanity in a welter of technicalities. One cannot believe in it, and it seldom succeeds in touching the emotions. However, as a spectacle the picture is worth its place in the average programme, and it is put over with sufficient realism to entertain and satisfy the majority."

Film Weekly wrote: "This new version of lan Hay's well-known play compares unfavourably with the silent film made some years back. The talkie concentrates on the spectacalar angle at the expense of the human and dramatic elements. Millard Webb, the American director, seems to be so intent on taking his principal character round the world that emotional values are more than a little neglected until the tragic 'happy ending' is reached."

The Daily Film Renter wrote: "Lavishly mounted talkie of Ian Hay play. Vivid shipwreck scenes and continual variety of location help materially to put over picture which, despite imperfections of acting and direction, is safe booking proposition. Film that opens particularly well, maintains its atmosphere throughout, and will undoubtedly appeal to British audiences."
