= Jane Baxter =

British actress (1909–1996)

- Jane Baxter, 1938
- Born: Feodora Kathleen Alice Forde; 9 September 1909; Bremen, Germany
- Died: 13 September 1996 (aged 87); London, England
- Occupation: Actress
- Years active: 1930–1976
- Spouses: Clive Dunfee (m. 1930–1932) Arthur Montgomery (m. 1939–1978)

Jane Baxter (9 September 1909 – 13 September 1996) was a British actress. Her stage career spanned half a century, and she appeared in a number of films and in television.

== Early life ==
Baxter was born as Feodora Kathleen Alice Forde in Bremen, Germany to an Anglo-Irish naval engineer father and a German mother of noble background, Hedwig von Dieskau. The family castle lies on the outskirts of Halle in Saxony-Anhalt. Hedwig had been lady-in-waiting to Princess Charlotte, sister of Kaiser Wilhelm II. Feodora was named after Charlotte's daughter, Princess Feodora of Saxe-Meiningen, who committed suicide in 1945. Feodora's father passed away when she was just six months old, leaving her to be raised by Dieskau along with an elder sister and younger brother. The sisters would both attend the Italia Conti School in Woking, England.

== Career ==
Feodora Forde came to London at the age of six and studied acting at the Italia Conti Academy. She made her debut on the London stage at the age of 15 at the Adelphi Theatre in 1925 as an urchin in a short-lived musical, Love's Prisoner, alongside her brother-in-law, Harry Welchman. Her breakthrough occurred in 1928 when she substituted as Peter Pan for Jean Forbes-Robertson, whom she understudied. On the advice of the play's author, J. M. Barrie, Feodora changed her name to Jane Baxter which led to him affectionately calling her his "stage god-daughter". She was spotted by the writer Ian Hay, who suggested her for the lead in A Damsel in Distress, a play he had written with P. G. Wodehouse.

She made her screen debut in 1930 in a B-movie, Bed and Breakfast, and acted in a succession of films in the 1930s, most famously Blossom Time with Richard Tauber in 1934. She also performed in several West End shows and in 1935 she joined the repertory company at the Liverpool Playhouse. Here the leading actor was Michael Redgrave who found her "a delightful actress"; she would become his daughter Vanessa's godmother. She had further success in London in 1937 with George and Margaret which ran for two years and in 1947 she co-starred on Broadway with John Gielgud and Margaret Rutherford in The Importance of Being Earnest, in which she played Cicely Cardew. Another classic role in 1948 was Viola in Twelfth Night at the Old Vic, which was the stage directing debut of Alec Guinness.

After a year's run in Dial M for Murder in 1952, she continued to work in the theatre for 20 years her last West End appearance being in A Voyage Round My Father, which co-starred her old friend, Michael Redgrave. Baxter's television work included plays and series such as Upstairs, Downstairs. Her last appearance was in the documentary Missing Believed Lost (1992), in which Sir John Mills also appeared.

== Personal life ==
Baxter married Clive Dunfee, the racing driver, in 1930 and witnessed his death in a race at Brooklands two years later. In 1939, she married Arthur Montgomery, a businessman, with whom she had two daughters and one son.

== Death ==
Jane Baxter died in 1996, four days after her 87th birthday, from stomach cancer.

== Miscellaneous ==
Newspaper journalist Tom Vallance described Jane Baxter as "the epitome of middle-class breeding – sensible and practical, pretty rather than glamorous, with a delicate complexion. Perfect elocution, a beaming smile, and a hint of the coquette behind the cool exterior."

Of her performance in the film Ships with Wings, Prime Minister Winston Churchill called Baxter "that charming lady whose grace personifies all that is best in British womanhood."

== Filmography ==
- Bed and Breakfast (1930)
- Bedrock (1930)
- Down River (1931)
- Two White Arms (1932)
- Flat No. 9 (1932)
- The Constant Nymph (1933)
- The Night of the Party (1934)
- The Double Event (1934)
- We Live Again (1934)
- The Little Minister (1934)
- Blossom Time (1934)
- Girls, Please! (1934)
- The Clairvoyant (1935)
- Enchanted April (1935)
- Line Engaged (1935)
- Royal Cavalcade (1935)
- Drake of England (1935)
- Dusty Ermine (1936)
- The Man Behind the Mask (1936)
- The Man Who Could Work Miracles (1936)
- Second Best Bed (1938)
- The Ware Case (1938)
- Confidential Lady (1939)
- Murder Will Out (1939)
- Chinese Bungalow (1940)
- The Briggs Family (1940)
- Ships with Wings (1941)
- The Flemish Farm (1943)
- Death of an Angel (1952)
- Upstairs Downstairs (episode 'A Change of Scene') (1973) as The Dowager Lady Newbury

== Selected stage credits ==
- George and Margaret by Gerald Savory (1937)
- Living Room by Esther McCracken (1943)
- The Damask Cheek by John Van Druten (1949)
- The Holly and the Ivy by Wynyard Browne (1950)
