= Important People (film) =

- Directed by: Adrian Brunel
- Written by: F. Wyndham-Mallock (play)
- Produced by: George Smith
- Starring: Stewart Rome; Dorothy Boyd; Jack Raine; Helen Goss
- Production company: George Smith Productions
- Distributed by: MGM
- Release date: February 1934
- Running time: 48 minutes
- Country: United Kingdom
- Language: English

Important People is a 1934 British comedy film directed by Adrian Brunel and starring Stewart Rome, Dorothy Boyd and Jack Raine. In the film, a bickering couple stand against each other as candidates in a local council election.

== Cast ==
- Stewart Rome as Tony Westcott
- Dorothy Boyd as Margaret Westcott
- Jack Raine as George Pelling
- Helen Goss as Beryl Cardew
- Henry B. Longhurst as Colonel Clutterbuck
- James Carrall as General Harbottle
- Fred Withers as Ald Digley
- May Hallatt as Mrs. Stenham
