= The Damask Cheek =

- Original language: English
- Written by: John Van Druten; Lloyd Morris
- Genre: Comedy

Premiere
- Date: 9 October 1942
- Place: Plymouth Theatre, Boston

The Damask Cheek is a 1942 comedy play by the British writer John Van Druten in collaboration with Lloyd Morris.

It was first performed in Plymouth Theatre in Boston before a 93 performance Broadway run at the Playhouse Theatre. The cast featured Flora Robson, Celeste Holm and Zachary Scott with Van Druten himself directing.

In 1949 it began its first London run at the Lyric Theatre in Hammersmith running for 36 performances. The cast included Bill Travers, Jane Baxter, Iris Hoey and Claire Bloom.

== Bibliography ==
- Davis, Ronald L. Zachary Scott: Hollywood's Sophisticated Cad. University Press of Mississippi, 2009.
- Wearing, J.P. The London Stage 1940-1949: A Calendar of Productions, Performers, and Personnel. Rowman & Littlefield, 2014.
