= Benita Hume =

English actress (1907–1967)

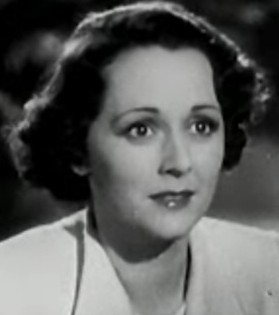
- from The Last of Mrs. Cheyney (1937)
- Born: 14 October 1907; London, England
- Died: 1 November 1967 (aged 60); Egerton, Kent, England
- Resting place: Kent County Crematorium, Charing, Kent, England
- Occupation: Actress
- Years active: 1925–1956
- Spouses: Eric Siepmann (m. 1926; div. 1931) Ronald Colman (m. 1938; died 1958) George Sanders (m. 1959)
- Children: 1

Benita Hume (14 October 1907 – 1 November 1967) was an English theatre and film actress. She appeared in more than 40 films from 1925 to 1955.

== Life and career ==
She was married to film actor Ronald Colman from 1938 to his death in 1958; they were the parents of a daughter, Juliet. She starred with Colman in both versions of the situation comedy The Halls of Ivy, an NBC Radio programme (1950–1952) and a CBS Television show (1954–1955). She also made occasional guest appearances with her husband on The Jack Benny Show on radio, and the Colmans were portrayed as Benny's long-suffering next-door neighbours, roles they reprised once on his television show.

After Colman's death, she married actor George Sanders in 1959, and they remained together until her death in 1967. Sanders originally was signed to play Sheridan Whiteside in the musical Sherry!, but when Hume became terminally ill with cancer, he withdrew from the project. Hume died in Kent from bone cancer at age 60.

== Filmography ==
=== Film credits ===
- The Happy Ending (1925) as Miss Moon
- Second to None (1927) as Ina
- The Constant Nymph (1928) as Antonia Sanger
- Easy Virtue (1928) as Telephone Receptionist (uncredited)
- Balaclava (1928) as Jean McDonald
- A South Sea Bubble (1928) - Averil Rochester
- A Light Woman (1928) as Dolores de Vargas
- The Lady of the Lake (1928) as The Lady of the Lake
- High Treason (1929) as Evelyn Seymour
- The Clue of the New Pin (1929) as Ursula Ardfern
- The Wrecker (1929) as Mary Shelton
- The House of the Arrow (1930) as Betty Harlow
- Symphony in Two Flats (1930) as Lesley Fullerton (UK version)
- The Flying Fool (1931) as Marion Lee
- A Honeymoon Adventure (1931) as Eve Martin
- The Happy Ending (1931) as Yvonne
- Service for Ladies (1932) as Countess Ricardi
- Women Who Play (1932) as Margaret Sones
- Help Yourself (1932) as Mary Lamb
- Diamond Cut Diamond (1932) as Marda Blackett
- Men of Steel (1932) as Audrey Paxton
- Sally Bishop (1932) as Evelyn Standish
- Lord Camber's Ladies (1932) as Janet King
- Discord (1933) as Phil Stenning
- The Little Damozel (1933) as Sybil Craven
- Clear All Wires! (1933) as Kate
- Looking Forward (1933) as Mrs. Isobel Service
- Gambling Ship (1933) as Eleanor La Velle
- Only Yesterday (1933) as Phyllis Emerson
- The Worst Woman in Paris? (1933) as Margaret Ann 'Peggy' Vane
- The Private Life of Don Juan (1934) as Dona Dolores, a Lady of Mystery
- Jew Suss (1934) as Marie Auguste
- 18 Minutes (1935) as Lady Phyllis Pilcott
- The Divine Spark (1935) as Giuditta Pasta
- The Gay Deception (1935) as Miss Channing
- The Garden Murder Case (1936) as Nurse Beeton
- Moonlight Murder (1936) as Diana
- Suzy (1936) as Diane Eyrelle
- Tarzan Escapes (1936) as Rita Parker
- Rainbow on the River (1936) as Julia Layton
- The Last of Mrs. Cheyney (1937) as Kitty Wynton
- Peck's Bad Boy with the Circus (1938) as Myrna Daro

=== Television credits ===
- Four Star Playhouse (1953) as Mrs. Bosanquent
- The Halls of Ivy (1954–1955) as Victoria Cromwell 'Vicky' Hall

== Selected stage credits ==
- London Life by Arnold Bennett (1924)
- Chance Acquaintance by John Van Druten (1927)
