= Murder by Rope =

- Directed by: George Pearson
- Written by: Ralph Neale
- Produced by: Anthony Havelock-Allan
- Starring: Constance Godridge; D. A. Clarke-Smith; Sunday Wilshin
- Cinematography: Ernest Palmer
- Production company: British & Dominions Film Corporation
- Distributed by: Paramount British Pictures
- Release date: 25 August 1936
- Running time: 64 minutes
- Country: United Kingdom
- Language: English

Murder by Rope is a 1936 British mystery film directed by George Pearson and starring Constance Godridge, D. A. Clarke-Smith and Sunday Wilshin. It was written by Ralph Neale.

== Plot ==
Murder trial jurors receive threatening letters apparently in the handwriting of a criminal they have sent for execution. Scotland Yard enlist the services of handwriting expert Hanson, who, it turns out, is not all he seems.

== Cast ==
- Constance Godridge as Daphne Farrow
- D. A. Clarke-Smith as Hanson
- Sunday Wilshin as Lucille Davine
- Wilfrid Hyde-White as Alastair Dane
- Donald Read as Peter Paxton
- Daphne Courtney as Flora
- Dorothy Hamilton as Mrs. Mulcaire
- Guy Belmore as Simpson
- Philip Hewland as Judge Paxton
- Graham Cheswright as jury foreman
- Charles Barrett
- William Collins
- Alban Conway

== Reception ==
Kine Weekly wrote: "Murder mystery drama pathological in theme, but mainly theatrical in its kinematic execution. The story opens with promise, it has ingenuity and originality, but soon lack of imagination causes it to lose its grip, and it ends conventionally and unmistakably just a Quota product. Second feature for the not too sophisticated."

Picture Show wrote: "Acting and direction undistinguished."

Picturegoer wrote: "Theatrical treatment robs this murder mystery of its promise of ingenuity and originality. It is not too well acted, and its appeal is mainly directed to the unsophisticated. Basically it is a 'spot the murderer' affair."

In British Sound Films: The Studio Years 1928–1959 David Quinlan rated the film as "poor", writing: "Undistinguished crime thriller."
