= Look Before You Love =

1948 film

- Directed by: Harold Huth
- Screenplay by: Reginald Long
- Story by: I Know You by Ketti Frings
- Produced by: John Corfield; Harold Huth
- Starring: Margaret Lockwood; Griffith Jones; Norman Wooland
- Cinematography: Harry Waxman
- Edited by: John D. Guthridge
- Music by: Bretton Byrd
- Production company: Burnham Productions
- Distributed by: General Film Distributors (UK); Eagle Lion (US)
- Release dates: 7 December 1948 (UK); 1950 (US)
- Running time: 96 minutes
- Country: United Kingdom
- Language: English

Look Before You Love is a 1948 British drama film directed by Harold Huth, starring Margaret Lockwood, Griffith Jones and Maurice Denham. The screenplay was by Reginald Long, based on the story I Know You by Ketti Frings. The film reunited Lockwood and Jones, who had previously appeared together in The Wicked Lady (1945), which had been a major commercial success.

== Plot summary ==
A woman working in the British Embassy in Brazil falls in love and marries a man, but soon discovers him to be a drunken wastrel tied up with serious crime. He tries to get her to marry a dying millionaire so he can remarry her when she becomes a rich widow.

== Cast ==
- Margaret Lockwood as Ann Markham
- Griffith Jones as Charles Kent
- Norman Wooland as Ashley Morehouse
- Phyllis Stanley as Bettina Colby
- Maurice Denham as Fosser
- Frederick Piper as Miller
- Bruce Seton as Johns
- Michael Medwin as Emile Garat
- Violet Farebrother as dowager
- Peggy Evans as typist

== Production ==
The film was originally known as I Know You and Change of Heart. Margaret Lockwood had been arguing with the Rank Organisation over what films she should make, and had gone on suspension for refusing Roses on Her Pillow, but agreed to do this film.

Filming started on 15 March 1948, and took place at Denham Studios under the title Change of Heart. Star Griffith Jones recalled "We hoped for a comedy of wit, and style but it wasn't to be."

== Release ==
The film was released by Eagle Lion in the US in 1950. It was released without a certificate from the PCA because it thought the film breached its basic theme and detail.

== Critical reception ==
The film generally received poor reviews. According to Lockwood's biographer, "Few British films of the 1940s received a more devastating barrage of criticism than Look Before You Love when it was released in October 1948."

The Monthly Film Bulletin wrote: "This is an incredible story which reflects little credit on our diplomatic service. Margaret Lockwood and Griffith Jones are adequate; Norman Wooland, as Ashley, and Phyllis Stanley, as Charles' metallic girl friend, are more than efficient."

In a contemporary review, Variety called the film "an overlong and somewhat corny love story that gives Margaret Lockwood a sympathetic role after her many Wicked Lady characterisations, in which she has been so successfully typed in the past", adding, "it may gratify the out-of-town popular audiences, but its chances of success in any metropolis are scant."

TV Guide rated the film two out of five stars, dismissing it as a "Ridiculous story played straight; as a farce it might have had some chance."

== Bibliography ==
- Tims, Hilton (1989). Once a wicked lady : a biography of Margaret Lockwood. W.H. Allen.
