= Ben Field (actor) =

British actor (1876–1939)

Ben Field (1876–1939) was a British actor.

== Partial filmography ==
- Les cloches de Corneville (1917) - Iolo
- The Face at the Window (1920) - Peter Pottlebury
- The Bachelor's Club (1921) - Peter Parker
- Little Miss Nobody (1923) - Potter
- Venetian Lovers (1925) - William P. Bradshaw
- A South Sea Bubble (1928) - Isinglass
- The Man Who Changed His Name (1928) - Sir Ralph Whitcombe
- The Silver King (1929) - Coombes
- Escape (1930) - Captain
- Caste (1930) - Albert Eccles
- Sally in Our Alley (1931) - Sam Bilson
- Michael and Mary (1931) - Tullivant
- Murder on the Second Floor (1932) - Mr. Armitage
- Service for Ladies (1932) - Breslmeyer
- Jack's the Boy (1932) - Mr. Bobday
- When London Sleeps (1932) - Lamberti
- The Good Companions (1933) - Mr. Droke
- Loyalties (1933) - Gilman
- Mrs. Dane's Defence (1933) - Mr. Bulsom-Porter
- The Man from Toronto (1933) - Jonathan
- Little Miss Nobody (1933) - Sam Brightwell
- Say It with Flowers (1934) - Joe Bishop
- Love, Life and Laughter (1934) - Mayor Of Granau (uncredited)
- The Secret of the Loch (1934) - Piermaster
- Music Hall (1934) - Steve
- Sing As We Go (1934) - Nobby
- The Clairvoyant (1935) - Simon
- On Top of the World (1936) - Old Harry
- Secret Lives (1937) - Karl Schmidt
- The Girl in the Taxi (1937) - Dominique
- The Mysterious Mr. Davis (1939) - Decorator (final film role)
