= Down River (1931 film) =

1931 British film by Peter Godfrey

- Trade show advertisement
- Directed by: Peter Godfrey
- Written by: Ralph Gilbert Bettison "Seamark" (Austin J. Small)
- Produced by: L'Estrange Fawcett
- Starring: Charles Laughton; Jane Baxter; Harold Huth
- Cinematography: Percy Strong
- Music by: Louis Levy
- Production company: Gaumont British Picture Corporation
- Distributed by: Gaumont British Distributors
- Release date: May 1931
- Running time: 73 minutes
- Country: United Kingdom
- Language: English

Down River is a 1931 British crime film directed by Peter Godfrey and starring Charles Laughton, Jane Baxter and Harold Huth. It was written by Ralph Gilbert Bettison based on the 1929 novel of the same title by "Seamark" (Austin J. Small), and was made as a quota quickie at Lime Grove Studios with sets designed by Andrew Mazzei.

== Plot ==
A man smuggling drugs up the River Thames is caught when a newspaper reporter pursues him.

== Cast ==
- Charles Laughton as Captain Grossman
- Jane Baxter as Hilary Gordon
- Harold Huth as John Durham
- Kenneth Kove as Ronnie Gordon
- Hartley Power as Lingard
- Arthur Goullet as Maxick
- Norman Shelley as Blind Rudley
- Frederick Leister as Inspector Manning
- Cyril McLaglen as Sergeant Proctor
- Humberston Wright as Sir Michael Gordon
- Hugh E. Wright as Charlie Wong

== Reception ==
Film Weekly wrote: "'Those who enjoy a thorough out-and-out melodrama will find all the ingredients of such a film in Down River. It is tough stuff ... The film has plenty of fights, a good deal of mysterious coming and going, and a few beautiful riverscapes, but there is little to recommend it beyond its undoubted spate of action."

Kine Weekly wrote: "Charles Laughton has, in the role of Grossman, an opportunity to display his genius for make-up, but he fails to draw a convincing character, and is never too sure of his dialect."
