= An Obvious Situation =

1930 film directed by Giuseppe Guarino

- Weekly story based on the film, Picture Show (16 May 1931)
- Directed by: Giuseppe Guarino
- Written by: Giuseppe Guarino
- Produced by: Giuseppe Guarino
- Starring: Sunday Wilshin; Walter Sondes; Carl Harbord
- Production company: Carlton Films
- Distributed by: Warner Brothers
- Release date: October 1930
- Running time: 65 minutes
- Country: United Kingdom
- Language: English

An Obvious Situation (also known as Hours of Loneliness) is a 1930 British crime film directed, written and produced by Giuseppe Guarino and starring Sunday Wilshin, Walter Sondes, and Carl Harbord. It was made as a quota quickie at Teddington Studios for release by Warner Brothers.

== Preservation status ==
The British Film Institute National Archive holds a collection of stills but no film or video materials.

== Plot ==
Celia Stuart is married to businessman John, who neglects her. One night she is visited by Michael Turner, who loves her. They kiss but she immediately repents. A burglar appears and attempts to blackmail them. There is a struggle and Michael shoots him. John, who is telephoning the house at that very moment, hears the truth, returns home and knocks Michael out. After much discussion Celia and John are reconciled.

== Cast ==
- Sunday Wilshin as Cella Stuart
- Walter Sondes as John Stuart
- Carl Harbord as Michael Turner
- Marjorie Jennings as Betty Chase
- Michael Hogan as Trimmett
- Iris Ashley as Babe Carson
- Mina Burnett as Manette
- Harold Huth as Gustave

== Reception ==
Kine Weekly wrote: "Very thin story on the neglected wife theme. Development is excessively slow. ... It is not wholly fair to blame the cast for their acting, as their lines are very inadequate. ... The action is so slow that it emphasises the complete banality of the dialogue and the slightness of the story. There was the chance of a good climax, but it tailed off into nothing. ...There is little to recommend in this picture."
