= My Sister and I (1948 film) =

- Original lobby card
- Directed by: Harold Huth
- Written by: Michael Medwin; A.R. Rawlinson; Joan Rees; Robert Westerby
- Based on: High Pavement (aka Old Mrs. Camelot) by Emery Bonett
- Produced by: John Corfield; Harold Huth
- Starring: Sally Ann Howes; Barbara Mullen; Dermot Walsh; Hazel Court; Martita Hunt; Patrick Holt
- Cinematography: Harry Waxman
- Edited by: John D. Guthridge
- Music by: Bretton Byrd
- Production company: Burnham Productions
- Distributed by: General Film Distributors (UK)
- Release date: 8 June 1948 (London)
- Running time: 97 minutes
- Country: United Kingdom
- Language: English

My Sister and I (also known as High Pavement) is a 1948 British drama film directed by Harold Huth and starring Sally Ann Howes, Barbara Mullen, Dermot Walsh, Hazel Court, Martita Hunt and Patrick Holt. It was written by Michael Medwin, A.R. Rawlinson, Joan Rees and Robert Westerby based on the 1944 novel High Pavement by Emery Bonett.

== Plot summary ==
A young woman who acts in a small theatre comes under suspicion of murder when the elderly lady she lodges with dies and leaves her all her money.

== Cast ==
- Sally Ann Howes as Robina Adams
- Dermot Walsh as Graham Forbes
- Martita Hunt as Mrs. Camelot
- Barbara Mullen as Hypatia Foley
- Patrick Holt as Roger Crisp
- Hazel Court as Helena Forsythe
- Joan Rees as Ardath Bondage
- Jane Hylton as Elsie
- Michael Medwin as Charlie
- Rory MacDermot as Michael Marsh
- Hugh Miller as Hubert Bondage
- Ian Wilson as Horsnell
- Niall Lawlor as Harry
- Elizabeth Sydney as Phyllis
- Jack Vyvian as Pomfret
- Helen Goss as Mrs. Pomfret
- Stewart Rome as Colonel Thursby
- Olwen Brookes as Mrs. Lippincott
- Wilfrid Caithness as Coroner
- John Miller as Bishop
- Amy Dalby as female cleaner
- James Knight as dustman
- Barbara Leake as first elderly woman
- Diana Dors as dreary girl

== Reception ==
The Monthly Film Bulletin wrote: "As is so frequently the case, the story suffers somewhat by its translation to the screen; there is insufficient time in which fully to develop the various characters and circumstances surrounding them, to make the probability of their guilt seem credible. Viewed without the, in this case, disadvantage of having read the book, it is quite a good average amongst films of its type, and the mystery is well preserved until the end."

Kine Weekly wrote: "Bizarre murder mystery melodrama ... The play is poor in conception and never comes to life until the sensational last reel, while the acting, a mixture of experience and the immature, accentuates the novelettish make-up of the tale. A pretentious pot-boiler, it's a proposition mainly for the industrial element and sticks."

Picture Show wrote: "Apart from Sally Ann Howes and Martita Hunt, the acting is stilted, and the film seldom convinces."

Variety wrote: "This is a feeble, high-schoolish production, with not much chance here or abroad."
