= The Scoop (film) =

- Tom Helmore and Peggy Blythe in the film
- Directed by: Maclean Rogers
- Written by: Gerald Geraghty; Basil Mason
- Based on: play The Scoop by Jack Heming
- Produced by: A. George Smith
- Starring: Tom Helmore; Anne Grey; Peggy Blythe
- Cinematography: Geoffrey Faithfull
- Production company: British and Dominions Film Corporation
- Distributed by: Paramount British Productions (UK)
- Release date: October 1934 (UK)
- Running time: 68 minutes
- Country: United Kingdom
- Language: English

The Scoop is a 1934 British crime film directed by Maclean Rogers and starring Anne Grey, Tom Helmore and Wally Patch. It was produced as a quota quickie by British and Dominions Film Corporation.

== Preservation status ==
The British Film Institute National Archive holds a collection of ephemera but no film or video materials.

== Plot ==
Young newspaper reporter Scoop Moreton gets his big break when he is assigned to cover a murder. The suspects are the victim's wife, her lover, and a burglar. However it is finally revealed that Moreton himself is the culprit, having killed in self-defence.

== Cast ==
- Tom Helmore as Scoop Moreton
- Anne Grey as Mrs. Banyon
- Peggy Blythe as Marion Melville
- Wally Patch as Harry Humphries
- Arthur Hambling as Inspector Stephenson
- Reginald Bach as Daniels
- Roland Culver as Barney Somers
- Cameron Carr as Douglas Banyon
- Marjorie Shotter as reporter
- Moore Marriott as Jim Stewart

== Reception ==
Kine Weekly wrote: "There is the material for a good newspaper murder mystery drama in this film, but it has been wasted. That snappy, concise treatment characteristic of all successful American crime dramas, is lacking. The entertainment for the most part is dead. ... Tom Helmore is not good as the reporter; he is too slow and disinterested, and his lethargy lets the cat out of the bag. ... The planning of the story certainly reveals invention, ingenious coincidence plays an important part in the make-up of the plot, but poor atmosphere and lazy deve'opment negatives the drama's good points."

The Daily Film Renter wrote: "The succession of events makes it rather difficult for the material to attain entire conviction. Of the acting, little need be said, for the portrayals are of the conventional pattern."

Picture Show wrote: "Tom Helmore as Scoop Moreton, the news hound, does not give a very convincing performance, which can be said of almost the entire cast. Arthur Hambling as the unhappy detective is quite good. Fair entertainment."
