= Adventurous Youth =

1928 British silent film by Edward Godal

- Directed by: Edward Godal
- Written by: Edward Godal
- Produced by: Edward Godal
- Starring: Derrick De Marney; Renee Clama; Dino Galvani; Sybil Wise
- Production company: Pall Mall Productions
- Distributed by: Warner Brothers
- Release date: 1928
- Running time: 54 minutes
- Country: United Kingdom
- Languages: silent English intertitles

Adventurous Youth is a 1928 British silent Western film directed by Edward Godal and starring Derrick De Marney, Renee Clama and Dino Galvani. It depicts an Englishman (Derrick de Marney) who is voluntarily caught up in the Mexican Revolution. He tries to help save a village, where he has been working, from being sacked and destroyed. The film was made as a quota quickie and distributed in the United States by Warner Brothers.

== Cast ==
- Derrick De Marney as the Englishman
- Renee Clama as Mary Ferguson
- Dino Galvani as Don Esteban
- Sybil Wise as the Vamp
- Loftus Tottenham as Mr Ferguson
- Julius Kantorez as Father O'Flannigan
- Harry Bagge
- Lionel d'Aragon
- Harry Peterson

== Bibliography ==
- Chibnall, Steve. Quota Quickies: The Birth of the British 'B' film. British Film Institute, 2007.
- Wood, Linda. British Films, 1927–1939. British Film Institute, 1986.
