= The Light in the Clearing =

1921 silent film

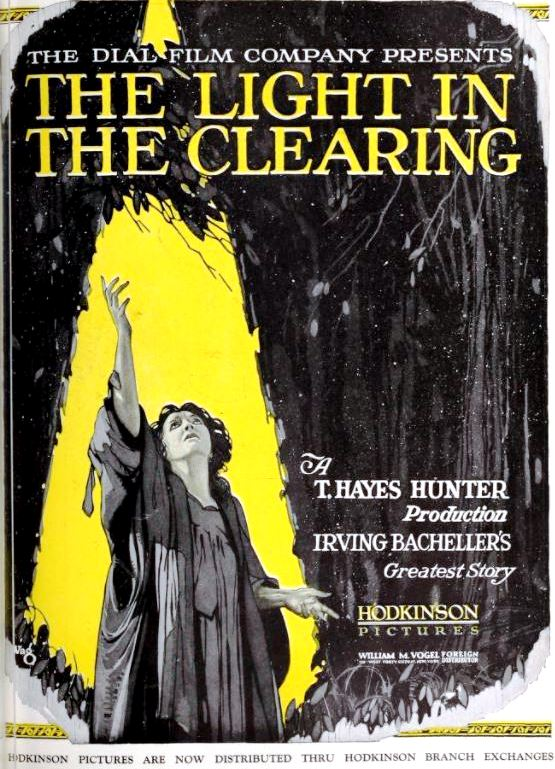
- Directed by: T. Hayes Hunter
- Written by: William R. Leighton
- Based on: The Light in the Clearing by Irving Bacheller
- Produced by: T. Hayes Hunter
- Starring: Eugenie Besserer; Clara Horton; A. Edward Sutherland
- Cinematography: Abe Scholtz
- Production company: Dial Film Company
- Distributed by: Hodkinson Pictures
- Release date: November 20, 1921
- Running time: 70 minutes
- Country: United States
- Language: Silent (English intertitles)

The Light in the Clearing is a 1921 American silent drama film directed by T. Hayes Hunter and starring Eugenie Besserer, Clara Horton, and A. Edward Sutherland.

== Plot ==
As described in a film magazine review, Barton Baynes receives a prophesy of four perils and a rosy future from the Silent Woman, while Amos, the son of Ben Grimshaw who was the tightfisted power over the farmers, receives one of death and the gallows. One night Bart meets the Stranger. There is another traveler on the road and it happens that the three come together. Ben sees the flash of a gunshot and the Stranger drops to the road. He sees the assailant comes up and bends over the body. Ben hurls a stone and strikes the assailant in the temple, and then hurries off and spreads the news of what happened. The body turns out to be that of the son of the Silent Woman, and she falls prostrate with grief. Amos is convicted of the crime, and old Ben falls dead with the Old Woman's bony fingers pointed at him. However, Barton's future is bright with the smiles of Sally and success.

== Cast ==
- Eugenie Besserer as Roving Kate
- Clara Horton as Sally Dunkelberg
- A. Edward Sutherland as Barton Baynes
- George Hackathorne as Amos Grimshaw
- Frank Leigh as Ben Grimshaw
- Andrew Arbuckle as Horace Dunkelberg
- Arthur Morrison as Uncle Peabody
- Alberta Lee as Aunt Deel
- Jack Roseleigh as Joe Wright
- Virginia Madison as Mrs. Horace Dunkelberg
- J. Edwin Brown as Squire Fullerton

== Preservation status ==
- With no prints located in any archive, the film is now lost.

== Bibliography ==
- Munden, Kenneth White. The American Film Institute Catalog of Motion Pictures Produced in the United States, Part 1. University of California Press, 1997.
