= The Silver King (1929 film) =

1929 film

- Directed by: T. Hayes Hunter
- Written by: Henry Herman; Fenn Sherie; Henry Arthur Jones (play)
- Starring: Percy Marmont; Harold Huth; Jean Jay; Chili Bouchier
- Cinematography: Bernard Knowles
- Production company: Welsh-Pearson-Elder
- Distributed by: Paramount British
- Release date: May 1929
- Running time: 86 minutes
- Country: United Kingdom
- Languages: Silent; English intertitles

The Silver King is a 1929 British silent drama film directed by T. Hayes Hunter and starring Percy Marmont, Harold Huth and Chili Bouchier. The film is an adaptation of the 1882 play The Silver King by Henry Arthur Jones. It was made at Cricklewood Studios and Lime Grove Studios. The film was an ambitious production by the Welsh-Pearson company made at an estimated cost of around £60,000. However the company's decision to shoot it and other films that year as silents led to large financial losses due to the emergence of sound.

== Plot ==
Wilfred Denver (Marmont) wins the heart of the beautiful Nellie (Jean Jay) and marries her, earning the ongoing festering resentment of Nellie's former beau Geoffrey Ware (Huth). A few years later, Wilfred and Nellie have a daughter, but Wilfred's financial recklessness has left him facing large debts. Geoffrey sees an opportunity for revenge by giving his desperate former friend a surefire insiders' tip on a horse running at generous odds in that year's Epsom Derby. Wilfred lays a large bet which he can ill afford, only to watch in dismay as the horse straggles home at the back of the field. Geoffrey feigns an apology, then urges Wilfred to drown his sorrows. He gets Wilfred completely befuddled and dishevelled with drink, then takes him home to Nellie, gloating to her about the dissolute wretch she chose over him.

As Geoffrey makes his way home later that evening, he is robbed and murdered by a band of crooks. The police learn of the events of the day and interview Wilfred, who is unable to provide a satisfactory account of his movements that evening. Realising that he faces arrest, trial and possible execution, Wilfred flees to America, leaving Nellie behind to fend for herself and their child as best she can.

Years pass, and Wilfred hits the jackpot in America with a silver mine. Now a rich man known to all as the "Silver King", he returns to England incognito. He sets about investigating the circumstances of Geoffrey's murder, and identifies the guilty individuals. He takes his evidence to the police, who exonerate him of all charges. He then engineers a reconciliation with Nellie and their now grown daughter Olive (Chili Bouchier).

== Cast ==
- Percy Marmont as Wilfred Denver
- Harold Huth as Geoffrey Ware
- Jean Jay as Nellie Denver
- Chili Bouchier as Olive
- Bernard Nedell as 'Spider' Skinner
- Hugh E. Wright as Jaikes
- Henry Wenman as Cripps
- Ben Field as Coombes
- Donald Stuart as Corkitt

== Bibliography ==
- Low, Rachael. History of the British Film, 1918-1929. George Allen & Unwin, 1971.
