= A Honeymoon Adventure =

1931 film

- Opening titles
- Directed by: Maurice Elvey
- Written by: John Paddy Carstairs; Rupert Downing
- Based on: novel by Cicely Fraser-Simson
- Produced by: Basil Dean
- Starring: Benita Hume; Peter Hannen; Harold Huth; Walter Armitage
- Cinematography: Robert Martin; Alex Bryce
- Edited by: Otto Ludwig
- Music by: Ernest Irving
- Production company: Associated Talking Pictures
- Distributed by: RKO Pictures
- Release date: 25 September 1931
- Running time: 66 minutes
- Country: United Kingdom
- Language: English

A Honeymoon Adventure (also known as Footsteps in the Night) is a 1931 British thriller film directed by Maurice Elvey and starring Benita Hume, Peter Hannen and Harold Huth. It was written by Rupert Downing and John Paddy Carstairs based on the 1927 novel Footsteps in the Night by Cicley Fraser-Simson.

== Plot ==
On the wedding day of Peter Martin, a brilliant scientist, and Eve Harvey, Walter Creason, an agent of a foreign power, learns that Peter has designed a revolutionary electric storage battery and taken the plans and specifications to Scotland to look over on his honeymoon. Creason plots to attend the wedding and follows the couple on their honeymoon in an attempt to discover and steal the plans.

Peter receives a telegram from his father-in-law instructing him to return by express train with his plans for an upcoming government conference. Sensing the urgency, he declares that he must return at once, to Eva's dismay.

Whilst travelling on the train, Peter is drugged and taken back to his cabin by a man who proceeds to search his case for the documents. When he regains consciousness the next morning he finds himself held at gunpoint in a run-down apartment. The man, Judson realises that Peter had not brought the papers with him and instructs him to telegram his wife to tell her he will be returning later than expected.

With Peter detailed by his accomplice, Creason arrives at their honeymoon location, a large Scottish castle, masquerading as a friend of her husband's who was expecting to meet him. Eve offers him a room for the night. They dine together and after dinner Creason notices with interest a safe hidden in the wall. Peter's telegram then arrives and Eve grows suspicious of the stranger who becomes increasingly boorish. Later that night Creason searches for more hidden compartments, attempting to find the battery plans. Eve follows and manages to claim the documents, deceiving Creason in the process.

The following morning Creason tells Eve he has keys to the safe which he claims her husband gave him to collect the important documents. The safe is opened but Creason realises the drawings are missing, growing suspicious that Eve is hiding them. With the assistance of the castle's chauffeur, Eve evades the criminals who eventually track her to a steam train travelling from Scotland to Euston station in London. Judson pursues her through the city streets, proposing she give him the papers in return for her husband's location, which she refuses. Eve sends a friend out in her distinctive coat, tricking him into following the wrong woman.

In the meantime Peter starts a fire in his room, forcing the landlady to unlock the door. He then fights his way out of the building, making an escape from the criminals. Peter returns to his home where he is overjoyed to discover Eve. Creason then enters the house and threatens Peter at gunpoint to handover the documents. A fight ensues and Judson enters the fray. Just in time a policeman enters and stops the attack, apprehending the crooks.

== Cast ==
- Benita Hume as Eve Martin
- Peter Hannen as Peter Martin
- Harold Huth as Walter Creason
- Walter Armitage as Judson
- Jack Lambert as chauffeur
- Polly Emery as old woman
- Robert English as Mr Harvey
- Margery Binner as Josephine
- Frances Ross Campbell as Janet
- Fanny Wright as old woman

== Production ==
Production began in May 1931, with studio filming conducted in Beaconsfield as the modern Ealing Studios were currently under construction. In June 1931 production moved to a location shoot in Scotland including footage taken at Dalcross Castle, the home of Cicely Fraser-Simpson, the author of the story. The second day's shooting was supposed to take place at Dulsie Bridge, but weather was poor. Avenmore Junction was used for the third days' shooting, where a special train was hired.

Cicely Fraser-Simson was the second wife of English composer Harold Fraser-Simson, noted for his many works of light music including musical comedies and setting children poems to music, especially those of A. A. Milne. One of his pieces, "Waltz Song" was featured in the film.

A Honeymoon Adventure was produced as Footsteps in the Night which was the title of the original novel on which the film was based. The title change was announced just one day before the film premiere.

Lead actress Benita Hume's dresses were designed by the leading Paris-based British fashion designer Edward Molyneux.

== Reception ==
Film Weekly wrote: "Excellently photographed train-against-car races and a terrific climactic fight are the high-spots of a film that is just 'thick-ear' melodrama. Benita Hume, Harold Huth, and Peter Hannen play their parts with great gusto."

Kine Weekly wrote: "A frank, ingenious melodrama, which, despite its rather obvious construction, holds the interest and provides clean, refreshing fare for the masses. All the players thoroughly enter into the free easy spirit of the play, there is plenty of movement, and a wide variety of backgrounds."
