= The Captain's Table (1936 film) =

1936 British film by Percy Marmont

- Opening titles
- Directed by: Percy Marmont
- Written by: John Paddy Carstairs
- Produced by: James A. Fitzpatrick
- Starring: Percy Marmont; Marian Spencer; Louis Goodrich; Daphne Courtney
- Music by: Gideon Fagan
- Production company: FitzPatrick Pictures
- Distributed by: MGM
- Release date: November 1936
- Running time: 55 minutes
- Country: United Kingdom
- Language: English

The Captain's Table is a 1936 British crime film directed by and starring Percy Marmont, Marian Spencer and Louis Goodrich. It was written by John Paddy Carstairs, and was made at Shepperton Studios as a quota quickie for distribution by Metro-Goldwyn-Mayer.

== Plot ==
On an Atlantic liner, as it approaches New York, a woman is found strangled. Then a crew member is found similarly murdered. Several passengers come under suspicion, including the woman's husband, and a passenger who is subsequently revealed to be an undercover Scotland Yard policeman. When the ship reaches its destination, the identity of the killer is revealed.

== Cast ==
- Percy Marmont as John Brooke
- Marian Spencer as Ruth Manning
- Louis Goodrich as Captain Henderson
- Daphne Courtney as Mary Vaughan
- Mark Daly as Sanders
- Phillip Brandon as Eric Manning
- Hugh McDermott as Inspector Mooney

== Reception ==
The Monthly Film Bulletin wrote: "Although without much ingenuity this thriller has merit. The characters are clearly drawn, and the story, which is short, moves apace without digression."

Kine Weekly wrote: "Unpretentious crime drama, clumsily manufactured from the hackneyed 'spot the murderer formula'. The tale will have no difficulty in keeping an audience guessing, but not because of its ingenuity. It baffles for no other reason than that the development is vague and the denouement vaguer still. Booking for the uncritical."

The Daily Film Renter wrote: "Somewhat involved development makes action occasionally difficult to follow, while leisurely direction is additional drawback. Pleasant settings, fair acting performances and usual 'red herring' clues are main entertainment points. Second feature offering for not too sophisticated patrons."
