= High Treason (1929 British film) =

1929 British film by Maurice Elvey

- Directed by: Maurice Elvey
- Written by: L'Estrange Fawcett
- Based on: the play High Treason by Noel Pemberton Billing
- Produced by: Gaumont British Picture Corporation; Tiffany Pictures (Sound Version)
- Starring: Jameson Thomas; Benita Hume; Basil Gill
- Cinematography: Percy Strong
- Music by: Louis Levy (musical director)
- Distributed by: Gaumont British (UK); Tiffany Pictures (US)
- Release date: 9 September 1929
- Running time: 95 minutes
- Country: United Kingdom
- Languages: Silent Version; English Intertitles; Sound Version (All-Talking)

High Treason is a 1929 British film directed by Maurice Elvey and starring James Carew, Humberstone Wright, Benita Hume, Henry Vibart, Hayford Hobbs, Irene Rooke, and Jameson Thomas. It was written by L'Estrange Fawcett based on the 1927 play of the same title by Noel Pemberton Billing. Raymond Massey makes his first screen appearance in a small role.

The film is a science fiction drama set in a futuristic 1940 (though originally set in 1950 for the silent version). The plot and aesthetics of the film are heavily influenced by Fritz Lang's Metropolis.

== Plot ==
In 1940/50, world peace is threatened when the "United States of Europe" comes into conflict with the "Empire of the Atlantic States". The former comprises Europe, India, the Middle East, Canada, Africa, and Australasia. The latter is a combination of the United States and South America.

In the film the prohibition era in America extends to 1940 and the tension is initially caused by bootleggers crossing the borders between territories. One such incident leads to a shoot-out between border guards in which both sides suffer casualties. War looks likely, but the pacifist Peace League intervenes. Meanwhile, we learn that the tension is in fact carefully orchestrated by a sinister terrorist group financed by arms manufacturers. They blow up a rail tunnel under the English Channel. The President of Europe orders a mass enlistment and mobilisation, fearing that the Atlantic States are preparing a sneak attack.

Dr. Seymour, leader of the Peace League, desperately attempts to avert war. His daughter Evelyn seeks to convince her boyfriend Michael, commander of the European air force, not to fight, but he insists he must do his duty. Evelyn says she will leave him.

The European council are divided, but the president decides on war, saying that he will announce the outbreak of hostilities on television.

The terrorists try to kill Dr. Seymour by bombing the Peace League, but Seymour survives. He tells Evelyn to make another effort to stop Michael ordering the airforce to attack, while he appeals directly to the President. Pacifists led by Evelyn demonstrate en masse at the airfield. Michael is uncertain what to do, but Evelyn convinces him to delay the attack. Seymour confronts the President, but is forced, despite his pacifism, to shoot him to stop him making the broadcast. He is tried for murder but says he is content when a guilty verdict is reached.

== Cast ==
- Jameson Thomas as Michael Deane
- Benita Hume as Evelyn Seymour
- Basil Gill as President Stephen Deane
- Humberston Wright as Dr. Seymour
- Henry Vibart as Lord Sycamore
- James Carew as Lord Rawleigh
- Hayford Hobbs as Charles Falloway
- Milton Rosmer as Ernest Stratton
- Judd Green as James Groves
- Alf Goddard as tele-radiographer
- Irene Rooke as Senator
- Clifford Heatherley as delegate
- Wally Patch as Commissionaire
- Raymond Massey as cabinet-maker

== Production ==
The film was initially produced as a silent but mid-way during production, Elvey was pushed by the studio to add sound to the film in order to cash in on the talkies. The sound version was prepared in collaboration with Tiffany Pictures and this version was copyrighted by them in 1930 in the United States and never renewed making the sound version public domain in the United States. Tiffany Pictures used the sound-on-film RCA Photophone process to record the soundtrack. The film was also issued on sound-on-disc format using Tiffany-Tone (Vitaphone-type) sound discs. Although a third of the film was filmed in sound, Elvey maintained much of the silent footage and dubbed over the dialogue for shots that were originally silent, with Elvey himself voicing some of the minor characters, which he admitted when interviewed by the Manitoba Free Press shortly after the film was released in the US. Likewise, BIP's Blackmail, directed by Alfred Hitchcock, was also turned into a sound picture mid-way during production (concurrently when High Treason was also in production) and many of the silent scenes used dubbed dialogue and sound effects in a similar fashion to High Treason.

The Gaumont-Tiffany co-produced sound version of the film was presented in a London trade show on 9 August 1929, then went into UK general release in silent and sound versions on 9 September 1929. The sound version was released in the US by Tiffany Productions on 13 March 1930. The silent version and a trailer for the sound version are preserved and held by the British Film Institute; the only known surviving original copy of the sound version is a lavender fine grain of the American release version held in the collection of Alaska Moving Image Preservation Association (AMIPA), which has been restored by the Library of Congress.

== Music ==
The sound version featured a theme song entitled "There's Nothing New In Love" which was composed by Quentin Maclean and Louis Levy. Also featured on the soundtrack is the song "March On To Peace" composed by Walter R. Collins and Patrick K. Heale.

== Critical reception ==
Kine Weekly wrote: "A remarkable picture ... The story is vague and illogical, but to balance this there is amazing conception and ingenious detail work. ... The amazing conception of the picture, the ingenious way in which it attempts to present mechanical life of the future and illustrate the horrors and futility of war, provide sufficient interest to outweigh the incongruities and lack or real human drama."

The Daily Film Renter wrote: "The film is peculiarly adaptable to the indulgence in fantasies of the future, and there is no doubt that Metropolis set a good many producers wondering how they might project on the screen visions of what life may become in the years ahead. But even fantasy, to be successful in this medium, must have a logic of its own, and unfortunately this is exactly what High Treason seems to lack. ... The best things in it are a fantastic reproduction of how London (now completely Americanised) is likely to look in eleven years' time, and the more or less intelligent anticipation of the clothes we are likely to wear."

The New York Times wrote, "this story is really such a farrago of nonsense that one is sorry Maurice Elvey could not find better material to his expert hand."

The Radio Times wrote, "there is a sticky-backed plastic feel to the world of 1940 created by director Maurice Elvey on Gaumont's Shepherd's Bush soundstage, while the plot demonstrates a singular ignorance of political reality";

Horrornews.net wrote, "High Treason is one of the best examples of early science fiction cinema."

== Updated version ==
In 1998, a new sound version was produced by the combined efforts of the French drum and bass DJ duo Les Electrons Libres and local film archive La Cinémathèque de Toulouse. That version features a live electronic music mix set to a 71-minute copy from the Cinémathèque vault. The Les Electrons Libres version of High Treason was screened in Paris, Toulouse, Bordeaux and Rennes, and in Barcelona, Spain for the 1999 Sonar Festival.

== See also ==
- 1929 in science fiction
- List of early sound feature films (1926–1929)
