= Guilt (1931 film) =

1931 film

- Directed by: Reginald Fogwell
- Written by: Reginald Fogwell
- Produced by: Reginald Fogwell
- Starring: James Carew; Anne Grey; Harold Huth
- Production company: Reginald Fogwell Productions
- Distributed by: Paramount British Pictures
- Release date: January 1931
- Running time: 65 minutes
- Country: United Kingdom
- Language: English

Guilt is a 1931 British romance film directed, written and produced by Reginald Fogwell and starring James Carew, Anne Grey, Harold Huth and James Fenton. It was shot at Isleworth Studios as a quota quickie for release by Paramount Pictures.

== Preservation status ==
The British Film Institute National Archive holds no stills or ephemera, and no film or video materials.

== Plot ==
Dramatist James Barrett neglects his wife Anne, leading to her having a dalliance with Tony, an actor, and one of her husband's protégés. One evening, Anne and Tony are in Tony's flat, and believe that James has seen them. As a defence, they return to Anne's home and tell James that they have been rehearsing a suitable ending for his new play. James asks them to re-enact it, but this time with him playing the outraged husband, a role he plays so effectively that Tony takes fright and leaves. The experience proves a salutary lesson to Anne and Tony.

== Cast ==
- James Carew as James Barrett
- Anne Grey as Anne Barrett
- Harold Huth as Tony Carleton
- James Fenton as Roy
- Rex Curtis as Jack
- Anne Smiley as Phyllis
- Ernest Lester as Jennings

== Reception ==
Film Weekly wrote: "This film falls into the quota picture category, but it has merits which place it in reality well above the majority of pictures one finds in that class. To begin with, it has an original and quite gripping story. Added to this, there is really good acting from useful cast. ... This film grips you all the way with its note of suppressed fear and the doubt in the minds of the characters. For a small, cheaply made picture it is unusually effective."

Kine Weekly wrote: "Well acted triangle drama, which has an original theme, and an unexpected climax. The leading characters are skilfully portrayed, and succeed in bringing a fair modicum of conviction to the proceedings. As the picture depends more on dialogue than action for its entertainment, the appeal is rather limited to better-class patrons."
