= No Lady =

1931 film

- Directed by: Lupino Lane
- Written by: George Dewhurst; Bert Lee; R. P. Weston; L'Estrange Fawcett; Lupino Lane
- Produced by: L'Estrange Fawcett
- Starring: Lupino Lane; Renee Clama; Sari Maritza; Wallace Lupino
- Cinematography: Percy Strong
- Edited by: R. E. Dearing
- Music by: Louis Levy
- Production company: Gaumont British Picture Corporation
- Distributed by: Gaumont British Distributors
- Release date: 8 May 1931
- Running time: 70 minutes
- Country: United Kingdom
- Language: English

No Lady is a 1931 British comedy film directed by Lupino Lane and starring Lane, Renee Clama and Sari Maritza. It was written by George Dewhurst, Bert Lee, R. P. Weston, L'Estrange Fawcett and Lane and was made as a quota quickie. It was re-released in 1943.

== Synopsis ==
While on a family holiday in Blackpool, Mr Pog, a mild-mannered man, is mistaken for an international spy. He escapes a brush with the police in women's clothing which he has stolen but discovers a secret letter in the owner's handbag. This leads him to a meeting with representatives of the country of Ptomania (a thinly-disguised Germany) who are involved in an attempt to sabotage an international glider competition. A Hitler look-alike, complete with fringe, toothbrush moustache, and wild gesticulations, makes a brief appearance as the unnamed pilot of a doomed Ptomanian plane.The film also includes a song and dance routine as well as a number of slapstick moments.

== Partial cast ==
- Lupino Lane as Mr. Pog
- Renee Clama as Sonia
- Sari Maritza as Greta Gherkinski
- Wallace Lupino as Ptomanian Ptough
- Lola Hunt as Mrs. Pog
- Herman Darewski and his Blackpool Tower Band
- Eddie Jay in a bit part
- Sam Lee in a bit part
- Cyril McLaglen in a bit part
- Denis O'Neil as singer
- Charles Stone in a bit part

== Production ==
It was made at Lime Grove Studios in Shepherd's Bush by Gaumont British, a company linked to Gainsborough Pictures. The film sets were designed by art director Andrew Mazzei.

== Reception ==
Kine Weekly wrote: "The pantomimics and clever dancing of Lupino Lane, and a wide variety of spectacular scenes, bring fresh humour to this broad, obvious slapstick comedy... Apart from one or two dull patches, the picture moves at a merry pace and works up to a capital climax. ... Lupino Lane introduces all his familiar gags and a few new ones, and is quite funny during the periods when he masquerades as a woman. It is his untiring efforts which provide the fun. Lola dunt is quite good as the masterful Mrs. Pog, while Roy Carey is clever as Pat Pog, the precocious offspring."

The Monthly Film Bulletin wrote of the 1943 re-release: "This may have been tolerable popular entertainment in 1931 when it first appeared, but the passage of time now makes it so dated as to be almost unbearable except possibly for juvenile audiences."
