= The Man They Couldn't Arrest =

1931 film

- Directed by: T. Hayes Hunter
- Written by: T. Hayes Hunter; Angus MacPhail; Arthur Wimperis "Seamark" (Austin J. Small)
- Produced by: Michael Balcon
- Starring: Hugh Wakefield; Gordon Harker; Garry Marsh
- Cinematography: Leslie Rowson
- Edited by: Ian Dalrymple
- Production company: Gainsborough Pictures
- Distributed by: Ideal Films
- Release date: 24 July 1931
- Running time: 72 minutes
- Country: United Kingdom
- Language: English

The Man They Couldn't Arrest is a 1931 British crime film directed by T. Hayes Hunter and starring Hugh Wakefield, Gordon Harker, Garry Marsh and Dennis Wyndham. It was written by Hunter, Angus MacPhail and Arthur Wimperis based on the 1925 novel of the same title by "Seamark" (Austin J. Small), and was made by Gainsborough Pictures at Islington Studios in London.

== Plot summary ==
An amateur detective goes on the trail of a gang of violent criminals.

== Cast ==
- Hugh Wakefield as John Dain
- Gordon Harker as Tansey
- Garry Marsh as Delbury
- Nicholas Hannen as Lyall
- Robert Farquharson as Count Lazard
- Renee Clama as Marcia
- Dennis Wyndham as Shaughnessy

== Reception ==
Film Weekly wrote: "This British thriller is a really fine effort. Hugh Wakefield gives a first-class performance as the scientist-criminologist, while Nicholas Hannen, Gordon Harker, Garry Marsh and Renee Clama all fill their roles very adequately.There are some good London street exteriors which will delight the hearts of English filmgoers."

Kine Weekly wrote: "A crime drama which has a fantastic but ingenious story, and one that keeps the interest well held and provides plenty of excitement. The leading players are natural and act with conviction, staging is excellent, and direction most efficient. Holding and ingenious story, skilful direction, convincing portrayal, and excellent staging."
