= Walter Armitage =

South African playwright and actor (1906–1953)

- Born: 1 June 1906; Johannesburg, South Africa
- Died: 22 February 1953 (aged 46)

Walter Armitage (1 June 1906 – 22 February 1953, born in Johannesburg, South Africa) was a South African playwright, stage and film actor.

== Selected filmography ==
- Potiphar's Wife (1931)
- A Honeymoon Adventure (1931)
- The Love Habit (1931)
- Bombay Mail (1934)
- The Dover Road (1934)
- Great Expectations (1934)
