= The Ghoul (1933 film) =

1933 British horror film, once thought lost

- Directed by: T. Hayes Hunter
- Written by: Roland Pertwee; John Hastings Turner; Rupert Downing (adaptation)
- Based on: Play by Dr. Frank King; Leonard Hines
- Produced by: Michael Balcon
- Starring: Boris Karloff
- Cinematography: Günther Krampf
- Edited by: Ian Dalrymple; Ralph Kemplen
- Music by: Louis Levy; Leighton Lucas
- Production company: Gaumont-British Picture Corporation
- Distributed by: Woolf & Freedman Film Service
- Release dates: 6 August 1933 (London; premiere); 7 August 1933 (United Kingdom); 25 November 1933 (United States)
- Running time: 77 minutes
- Country: United Kingdom
- Language: English
- Budget: just under £40,000

The full film

The Ghoul is a 1933 British horror film directed by T. Hayes Hunter and starring Boris Karloff. The cast also features Harold Huth, Dorothy Hyson, Ernest Thesiger, Cedric Hardwicke, and Ralph Richardson in his first credited film role.

== Plot ==
Professor Henry Morlant, a great Egyptologist, thinks that the ancient jewel which he calls the "Eternal Light" will give him powers of rejuvenation if it is offered up to the ancient Egyptian god Anubis. But when Morlant dies, his servant Laing steals the jewel. While a gaggle of interlopers, including a disreputable solicitor and a fake parson, descend on the Professor's manor to investigate or steal the jewel for themselves, Morlant returns from the dead ("when the full moon strikes the door of my tomb", he predicted before dying) to kill everyone who has betrayed him.

== Cast ==
- Boris Karloff as Professor Henry Morlant, renowned Egyptologist
- Cedric Hardwicke as Mr. Broughton, the Professor's solicitor
- Ernest Thesiger as Laing, the Professor's clubfooted servant
- Dorothy Hyson as Miss Betty Harlon, the Professor's niece and one of his two heirs
- Anthony Bushell as Ralph Morlant, the Professor's nephew and one of his two heirs
- Kathleen Harrison as Miss Kaney, Miss Betty Harlon's flatmate and movie's comic relief
- Harold Huth as Sheikh Aga Ben Dragore, who sold the jewel to the Professor
- D. A. Clarke-Smith as Mahmoud
- Ralph Richardson as Nigel Hartley, false parson
- Jack Raine as Davis, Mr. Broughton's chauffeur (uncredited)
- George Relph as Doctor (uncredited)

== Release and preservation ==
Loosely based on a 1928 novel by Frank King (and subsequent play by King and Leonard J. Hines), The Ghoul was produced by Gaumont British and released in the UK in August 1933. Release in the US followed in January 1934, with a reissue in 1938. The film was financially successful in the UK, but performed disappointingly in the US. The only film made during a brief contract dispute with Universal Studios, The Ghoul also marked the first time in over two decades that Karloff had acted in Britain and the British film industry.

Subsequently, the film disappeared and was considered to be a lost film. In 1969, collector William K. Everson located a murky, virtually inaudible subtitled copy, Běs, in then-communist Czechoslovakia. Though missing eight minutes of footage including two violent murder scenes, it was thought to be the only surviving copy of the film. Everson had a 16mm copy made and for years made it available to film societies in England and the United States, including a screening at The New School in New York City in 1975 on a Halloween triple bill with Lon Chaney in The Monster and Bela Lugosi in The Gorilla. Subsequently, The Museum of Modern Art and Janus Film made an archival negative of the Prague print and it went into very limited commercial distribution.

In the early 1980s, a disused and forgotten film vault at Shepperton Studios, its door blocked by stacked lumber, was cleared and yielded the nitrate camera negative of the film in perfect condition. The British Film Institute took possession of the film, new prints were made, and the complete version aired on Channel 4 in the UK. However, the official VHS release from MGM/UA Home Video was of the mutilated Czech copy. In 2003, MGM/UA released the fully restored version of the film on DVD. It was subsequently released in the United Kingdom by Network Distributing, in restored DVD and Blu-Ray editions featuring a new commentary by Kim Newman and Stephen Jones.

== Later version ==
What A Carve Up! (1961) is a British comedy-horror film directed by Pat Jackson and starring Sid James, Kenneth Connor, and Shirley Eaton, loosely based on The Ghoul. It was released in the United States as No Place Like Homicide in 1962.

== See also ==
- List of rediscovered films
