= The Devil's Maze =

1929 film

- Directed by: Gareth Gundrey
- Written by: G.R. Malloch (play); Sewell Collins
- Produced by: Gareth Gundrey
- Starring: Renee Clama; Trilby Clark; Ian Fleming; Hayford Hobbs
- Cinematography: Percy Strong
- Music by: Louis Levy
- Production company: Gaumont British Picture Corporation
- Distributed by: Gaumont British Distributors
- Release date: 1 October 1929
- Country: United Kingdom
- Languages: Sound (All-Talking); English

The Devil's Maze is an all-talking 1929 sound British drama film directed by Gareth Gundrey and starring Renee Clama, Trilby Clark and Ian Fleming. The film was made at the Lime Grove Studios. A cut down edited silent version with intertitles was available for theatres who were not yet wired for sound. It was based on the play Mostly Fools by G.R. Malloch.

== Plot ==
The film tells the story of a woman who was seduced by a man and becomes pregnant. In order to uphold her reputation, the woman blames the pregnancy on an explorer whom she believes to be dead. The explorer, however, who is very much alive, makes an unexpected return.

== Cast ==
- Renee Clama as Frances Mildmay
- Trilby Clark as Barbara Carlton
- Ian Fleming as Derek Riffington
- Hayford Hobbs as Hon. James Carlton
- Gerald Rawlinson as Robin Masters
- Davy Burnaby as Mr. Fry

== Music ==
Musical numbers in the sound version of the film include “Four-Ways Suite” by Coates; “You’re My Silver Lining of Love” by Vincent Rose, and the theme song by Louis Levy.

== Reception ==
Due to the adult content of the film it was censored or banned in many places. The film was withdrawn from circulation in Dublin, Ireland after protests erupted.

== See also ==
- List of early sound feature films (1926–1929)

== Bibliography ==
- Cook, Pam (ed.). Gainsborough Pictures. Cassell, 1997.
- Low, Rachael. History of the British Film: Filmmaking in 1930s Britain. George Allen & Unwin, 1985 .
