= Downstream (1929 film) =

1929 British film by Giuseppe Guarino

Downstream is a 1929 British crime film directed by Giuseppe Guarino and starring Chili Bouchier, Harold Huth and Marie Ault.

== Plot ==
A detective goes undercover by taking a job as a bargee in order to prevent a woman's death.

== Cast ==
- Chili Bouchier – Lena
- Harold Huth – Peter Carras
- Marie Ault – Martha Jaikes
- David Dunbar – Digger Brent
- Judd Green – Tug Morton
- Frank Dane – Crook

== Bibliography ==
- Shafer, Stephen C. British popular films, 1929-1939: The Cinema of Reassurance. Routledge, 1997.
