= The Great Game (1930 film) =

British film

- Theatrical release poster
- Directed by: Jack Raymond
- Written by: Ralph Gilbert Bettison; William Hunter; John Lees; W. P. Lipscomb
- Produced by: L'Estrange Fawcett
- Starring: John Batten; Renee Clama
- Cinematography: Basil Emmott
- Production company: Gaumont-British Picture Corporation
- Release date: 27 August 1930
- Running time: 79 minutes
- Country: United Kingdom
- Language: English

The Great Game is a 1930 British film directed by Jack Raymond and starring John Batten and Renee Clama. It was written by Ralph Gilbert Bettison, William Hunter, John Lees and W. P. Lipscomb. It is one of the earliest feature films to use football as a central theme. Like The Winning Goal (1920) and The Ball of Fortune (1926), the main plot in The Great Game revolves around football.

== Plot ==
Dicky Brown is a young, aspiring footballer who plays for a struggling side, the fictional Manningford F.C., a team in the midst of a successful cup run. He manages to charm the daughter of the chairman and thus breaks into the side, and ultimately wins the Cup for his team. The manager of the team wants to give his young players a chance in the side; the chairman, on the other hand, insists on signing established star players, such as Jack Cock (then of Millwall F.C., previously of Chelsea F.C. and Everton F.C.).

== Cast ==
- John Batten as Dicky Brown
- Renee Clama as Peggy Jackson
- Jack Cock as Jim Blake
- Randle Ayrton as Henderson
- Neil Kenyon as Jackson
- Kenneth Kove as Bultitude
- A. G. Poulton as Banks
- Billy Blyth as Billy
- Lew Lake as Tubby
- Wally Patch as Joe Miller
- Rex Harrison as George

== Production ==
Much of the film is set in Chelsea's home ground, Stamford Bridge. It contains guest appearances by numerous real-life footballers from Chelsea F.C., Arsenal F.C., and Birmingham City F.C. These include George Mills, Andy Wilson, Sam Millington and Billy Blyth. It is also notable for featuring the first credited appearance of Rex Harrison.

== Reception ==
Kine Weekly wrote: "Ingenious drama woven around England's most popular outdoor game, Association football, which is exceedingly well characterised; the cast includes many well-known football players, and has a really good atmosphere. ... Randall Ayrton and Neil Kenyon, the Scotch comedian, act with conviction and are well contrasted in the leading roles. John Batten is a likeable hero, and Jack Cock, the well-known international, displays versatility and histrionic ability as Blake. The supporting cast is good, with the exception of Renee Clama, who is never happy in the role of Peggy. ... Although obviously made for the multitudinous football fans, the picture's appeal should be general, as there is sufficient variety to satisfy all."

Film Weekly wrote: "The story will not interest you as much as the behind-the-scenes glimpses of a team in all phases of training, and its directors deciding their policy in solemn conclave. The actual scenes of the game in progress, I feel, could have been photographed to better advantages but certainly none of the male roles could have heen better interpreted."

The Daily Film Renter wrote: "This football drama, culminating in scenes of a Wembley Cup Final, is a welcome change from American material of a similar character. Actual play is very well presented, crowd shots are excellent, and the 'behind scenes' atmosphere of a big club is realistically pictured. Story interest is quite strong enough to support the sporting appeal. Should prove a generally successful popular attraction."

== See also ==
- List of association football films
