= Edward Godal =

- Occupations: Film director and producer
- Years active: 1916–38

Edward Godal was a British film producer and director. During World War I Godal ran a training school for actors. He became a leading independent producer of British films after the war, becoming managing director of the small but ambitious British & Colonial, based at Walthamstow Studios from 1918 to 1924. He later became involved with plans to make colour films at the newly built Elstree Studios and a proposed big-budget adaptation of an H. G. Wells novel, neither of which came to anything. His producing career largely ended with the arrival of sound in 1929, and he made only one further film, in 1938.

== Selected filmography ==
- 12.10 (1919)
- Queen's Evidence (1919)
- The Scarlet Wooing (1920)
- The Sword of Damocles (1920)
- The Black Spider (1920)
- The Temptress (1920)
- Desire (1920)
- The Puppet Man (1921)
- The Audacious Mr. Squire (1923)
- Heartstrings (1923)
- The Taming of the Shrew (1923)
- The Dream of Eugene Aram (1923)
- Love and Hate (1924)
- Wanted, a Boy (1924)
- Adventurous Youth (1928, also directed)
- Chips (1938, also directed)

== Bibliography ==
- Low, Rachel. The History of British Film: Volume IV, 1918–1929. Routledge, 1997.
