= Bed and Breakfast (1938 film) =

1938 British film by Walter West

- Directed by: Walter West
- Written by: Frank Miller
- Produced by: Walter West
- Starring: Daphne Courtney; Barry Lupino; Frank Miller; Mabel Poulton
- Production company: Walter West Productions
- Distributed by: Coronel Pictures
- Release date: 1938
- Running time: 58 minutes
- Country: United Kingdom
- Language: English

Bed and Breakfast is a 1938 British drama film directed by Walter West and starring Daphne Courtney, Barry Lupino and Frank Miller. It depicts the lives of the inhabitants in a boarding house. It was the last appearance of the silent star Mabel Poulton in a feature film as well as the last to be directed by West. The film was made at Southall Studios, with production beginning in May 1936.

== Cast ==
- Daphne Courtney as Margaret Reynolds
- Barry Lupino as Bert Fink
- Frank Miller as Charles Blake
- Mabel Poulton as The Maid

== Bibliography ==
- Chibnall, Steve. Quota Quickies: The British of the British 'B' Film. British Film Institute, 2007.
- Low, Rachael. Filmmaking in 1930s Britain. George Allen & Unwin, 1985.
- Wood, Linda. British Films, 1927-1939. British Film Institute, 1986.
