= Discord (film) =

1933 British film by Henry Edwards

- Directed by: Henry Edwards
- Based on: A Roof and Four Walls by E. Temple Thurston
- Produced by: Herbert Wilcox
- Starring: Owen Nares; Benita Hume; Harold Huth
- Music by: Lew Stone
- Production company: British and Dominions
- Distributed by: Paramount British Pictures
- Release date: January 1933
- Running time: 80 minutes
- Country: United Kingdom
- Language: English

Discord is a 1933 British drama film directed by Henry Edwards and starring Owen Nares, Benita Hume and Harold Huth. Its plot involves a struggling composer who has to be supported financially by his wealthier wife. It was based on the play A Roof and Four Walls by E. Temple Thurston. It was made at British and Dominion Elstree Studios for release by Paramount Pictures.

== Cast ==
- Owen Nares as Peter Stenning
- Benita Hume as Phil Stenning
- Harold Huth as Lord Quilhampton
- Clifford Heatherley as Mr Moody
- Aubrey Fitzgerald as Mr Bollorn
- O. B. Clarence as Mr Hemming
- Harold Scott as Harold
- Archibald Batty
- Esme Hubbard
- Phyllis Calvert

== Bibliography ==
- Low, Rachael. Filmmaking in 1930s Britain. George Allen & Unwin, 1985.
- Wood, Linda. British Films, 1927-1939. British Film Institute, 1986.
