= John D. Guthridge =

British film editor

John Dominic Guthridge
- Born: 4 August 1912; England, United Kingdom
- Died: November 1995 (aged 83); Sussex, United Kingdom
- Occupation: Editor
- Years active: 1948–1976 (film)

John Dominic Guthridge (1912–1995) was a British film editor. He worked with director Basil Dearden on films such as Sapphire (1959) and Victim

== Selected filmography ==
- Vice Versa (1948)
- Look Before You Love (1948)
- My Sister and I (1948)
- The Reluctant Widow (1950)
- The Woman in Question (1950)
- The Browning Version (1951)
- Made in Heaven (1952)
- The Importance of Being Earnest (1952)
- Desperate Moment (1953)
- Hell Below Zero (1954)
- An Alligator Named Daisy (1955)
- Tiger in the Smoke (1956)
- Jumping for Joy (1956)
- Rockets Galore! (1957)
- Hell Drivers (1957)
- Sapphire (1959)
- The League of Gentlemen (1960)
- Victim (1961)
- The Mind Benders (1963)
- Woman of Straw (1964)
- Masquerade (1965)
- Shalako (1968)

== Bibliography ==
- Emma Bell & Neil Mitchell. Directory of World Cinema: Britain. Intellect Books, 2012.
