= Renee Clama =

British actress (1910–1990)

- Publicity still, 1929
- Born: Irene Carolina Emma Clama; 4 July 1910; London, United Kingdom
- Died: 30 June 1990 (aged 79); Bracknell, Berkshire; United Kingdom
- Occupation: Actress
- Years active: 1928-1931 (film)
- Spouse: Maurice Ostrer
- Children: 2

Irene "Renee" Carolina Emma Clama (4 July 1910 – 30 June 1990) was a British actress of paternal Italian parentage. She appeared, often in leading roles, in eleven British films of late 1920s and early 1930s including The Great Game (1930) and Never Trouble Trouble (1931) Many of her films were made by Gainsborough Pictures. She was married to British film executive Maurice Ostrer (né Morris Ostravitch), with whom she had two sons, Darryl (1934-2012) and Nigel (born 1935).

== Filmography ==
- Adventurous Youth (1928)
- Taxi for Two (1929)
- The Devil's Maze (1929)
- The Great Game (1930)
- Greek Street (1930)
- Symphony in Two Flats (1930)
- No Lady (1931)
- The Stronger Sex (1931)
- Never Trouble Trouble (1931)
- The Sport of Kings (1931)
- The Man They Couldn't Arrest (1931)

== Bibliography ==
- Low, Rachael. Filmmaking in 1930s Britain. George Allen & Unwin, 1985.
