= Just My Luck (1936 film) =

1936 film directed by Ray Heinz

- Directed by: Ray Heinz
- Written by: Wallace Sullivan; Scott E. Cleethorpe
- Produced by: Ray Heinz; Raymond Friedgen
- Starring: Charles Ray; Anne Grey; Eddie Nugent
- Cinematography: Arthur Martinelli
- Edited by: Helene Turner
- Music by: Lee Zahler
- Production company: New Century Pictures
- Distributed by: State Rights; First Division Pictures
- Release date: June 15, 1936 (US)
- Running time: 70 minutes
- Country: United States
- Language: English

Just My Luck is a 1936 American comedy-drama film. Directed by Ray Heinz, the film stars Charles Ray, Anne Grey, and Eddie Nugent. It was released on June 15, 1936.

== Cast ==
- Charles Ray as the secretary
- Anne Grey as the rich girl
- Eddie Nugent as the son
- Snub Pollard as the secretary's roommate
- Lillian Elliott the landlady
- Quentin R. Smith
- Lee Prather
- Matthew Betz
- Robert Graves
- John Roche
