= The Accomplice (1932 film) =

1932 film directed by Giuseppe Guarino

- Directed by: Giuseppe Guarino
- Music by: Lionel Cazaux; Georges Tzipine
- Production company: Pax Film
- Release date: 1932
- Running time: 73 minutes
- Country: France
- Language: French

The Accomplice (French: La complice) is a 1932 French crime film directed by Giuseppe Guarino and starring Régine Poncet, Jean Bradin and Gilbert Périgneaux.

== Cast ==
- Régine Poncet
- Jean Bradin
- Gilbert Périgneaux
- Paul Menant
- Philippe Richard
- Brunell
- Guitarre

== Bibliography ==
- Crisp, Colin. Genre, Myth and Convention in the French Cinema, 1929-1939. Indiana University Press, 2002.
