= Austin J. Small =

British writer, a.k.a. "Seamark" (1894–1929)

Austin James Small
- Born: Austin Major Small; 25 July 1894; Luton, Bedfordshire
- Died: 15 January 1929 (aged 34); Kensington, London
- Spouse: Yes
- Writing career
- Pen name: Seamark
- Genres: Thriller, detective, science fiction, adventure, romance, western, pulp fiction

Austin James Small (25 July 1894 – 15 January 1929) was an English writer of thriller, detective, science fiction, adventure, romance, and western novels and short stories. Most of Small's titles appeared in Britain under the pen name Seamark, while his American publisher preferred using the name Austin J. Small. Several film plots were based on his stories.

== Biography ==
Small was born Austin Major Small in Luton, Bedfordshire on 25 July 1894. He later changed his name to Arthur James Small. He ran away to sea as a boy and travelled the world, serving in the Royal Navy during the First World War, where he was a champion heavyweight boxer. He met and was inspired to write by Jack London, and adopted the pen name “Seamark” to comply with Admiralty regulations. He began his literary career in the early 1920s publishing new westerns and detective stories in British pulp magazines.

In 1924 he produced a western novel, The Frozen Trail, and three romantic novels in 1925, before publishing Master Vorst a.k.a. The Death Maker (1926), a science fiction novel in which a secret society based in London develops a means of destroying the human species with the help of a bacteriological weapon. He went on to write half a dozen detective novels, another science fiction novel, and many short stories.

He was found dead in Kensington, London, on 15 January 1929, from suicide by gas inhalation. Several of his works were not published until after his death, including his final science fiction novel The Avenging Ray (1930) in which a mad scientist intends to destroy the Earth using a death ray, and the title story in the collection Out of the Dark which features a wereleopard.

== Works ==
=== Detective novels ===
- The Silent Six (Hodder & Stoughton, London, 1926)
- The Man They Couldn't Arrest (George H. Doran Company, New York, 1925/Hodder & Stoughton, London 1927)
- The Master Mystery (Hodder & Stoughton, London, 1928/Doubleday, New York, 1928)
- The Vantine Diamonds (Hodder & Stoughton, London, 1930/Doubleday, New York, 1930)
- Down River (Hodder & Stoughton, London, 1929)/ The Needle’s Kiss (Doubleday, New York, 1929), published posthumously
- The Web of Destiny (Hodder & Stoughton, London, 1929)/ The Web of Murder (Doubleday, New York, 1929), published posthumously
- The Mystery-Maker (Hodder & Stoughton, London, 1929)/(Doubleday, New York, 1930), published posthumously

=== Science fiction novels ===
- Master Vorst (Hodder & Stoughton, London, 1926)/The Death Maker (George H. Doran, 1926)
- The Avenging Ray (Hodder & Stoughton, 1930/Doubleday, Doran - The Crime Club, 1930), published posthumously

=== Other novels ===
- The Frozen Trail (Houghton Mifflin Company, New York, 1924)
- Love’s Enemy (Hodder & Stoughton, London, 1924)
- Pearls of Desire (William Heinemann Ltd., London, 1924/Houghton Mifflin, New York, 1925)
- Peggy: A Love Romance (Hodder & Stoughton, London, 1925)

=== Short stories ===
Collections:

- Out of the Dark: A Volume of Stories (Hodder & Stoughton, London, 1931), published posthumously
- Pawns and Kings: Stories by Seamark (Hodder & Stoughton, London, 1931), published posthumously

As Seamark:

- Furrows of Destiny (1921)
- On the Northern Trail (1921)
- End o’ the Trail (1921)
- The Kid (1921)
- Only Siwash (1922)
- Hearts and Diamonds (1922)
- Snowflake (1922)
- Yesterday, Today, and Tomorrow (1922)
- The Way of a Man (1922)
- Jungle Whispers (1922)
- Crossing Trails (1922)
- Far from Nowhere (1922)
- The Wisdom of Kodiak Tommy (1922)
- The Civilizers (1923)
- Red Man’s Gods (1923)
- Smoke (1923)
- Evergales to Tin Sheds (1924)
- The Overdose (1924)
- The Last Laugh (1926)
- “Thank you, Emmy” (1927)
- Query (1931), published posthumously
- Black Man’s Medicine (1931), published posthumously
- The Seamark Omnibus of Thrills (Hodder & Stoughton, 1937), published posthumously

As Austin J. Small:

- Frozen Gold (William Heinemann, London, 1924)
- Thundering Snows (1925)
- Klondike Fires (1926)
- The Silent Death (1926)
- Square Peg (1932), published posthumously

== Film adaptations ==
- Sailors Don’t Care (1928), based on a novel
- The Perfect Crime (1925), based on a short story
- Down River (1931), based on the 1929 novel
- The Man They Couldn't Arrest (1931), based on the 1925 novel
- Murder in Reverse? (1945), based on the 1931 novel “Query”

== Sources ==
- Baudou, Alban; Schléret, Jean-Jacques (1984). Le vrai visage du masque (in French). Vol. 1. Paris: Futuropolis Gallisol Editions. pp. 399–400. OCLC 311506692.
- "Small, Austin J." British Library Main Catalogue.
- "Seamark - Austin J Small: Bibliography". Classic Crime Fiction.
- "Austin J. Small". Internet Speculative Fiction Database.
- "Small, Austin J." Library of Congress.
- "Small, Austin J." OCLC WorldCat Identities. Archived from the original on 16 November 2022.
