= Anne Grey =

English actress (1907–1987)

- Born: Aileen Stephen Ewing; 6 March 1907; Edmonton, Middlesex, England, UK
- Died: 3 April 1987 (aged 80); Lee-on-the-Solent, Hampshire, England, UK
- Years active: 1928–1938 (film)
- Spouse(s): George Ernest Gordon Hope-Johnstone (1940–1987; her death); 1 child Lester Matthews (1931–1938; divorced)

Anne Grey (born Aileen Stephen Ewing; 6 March 1907 – 3 April 1987) was an English actress, who appeared in 44 films between 1928 and 1939, including some Hollywood films during the late 1930s. She was educated at Lausanne and King's College London.

She had originally intended a literary career, and to become a journalist but went on stage instead. Her first film experience in 1925 was in a crowd scene in The Constant Nymph but she got second lead in her next picture just two months later. In 1934 she went to Hollywood.

== Filmography ==
- The Constant Nymph (1928)
- The Warning (1928)
- What Money Can Buy (1928)
- Master and Man (1929)
- Taxi for Two (1929)
- The Runaway Princess (1929)
- The School for Scandal (1930)
- The Nipper (1930)
- Cross Roads (1930)
- The Squeaker (1930)
- The Man at Six (1931)
- The Calendar (1931)
- Guilt (1931)
- The Old Man (1931)
- The Happy Ending (1931)
- Other People's Sins (1931)
- Leap Year (1932)
- Number Seventeen (1932)
- The Faithful Heart (1932)
- Lily Christine (1932)
- Murder at Covent Garden (1932)
- Arms and the Man (1932)
- One Precious Year (1933)
- The Lost Chord (1933)
- The Wandering Jew (1933)
- She Was Only a Village Maiden (1933)
- The Lure (1933)
- The Blarney Stone (1933)
- Leave It to Smith (1933)
- The Poisoned Diamond (1933)
- The Golden Cage (1933)
- The House of Trent (1933)
- The Fire Raisers (1934)
- The Scoop (1934)
- Road House (1934)
- Colonel Blood (1934)
- Borrowed Clothes (1934)
- Lady in Danger (1934)
- Break of Hearts (1935)
- Bonnie Scotland (1935)
- Just My Luck (1936)
- Too Many Parents (1936)
- Chinatown Nights (1937)
