= Giuseppe Guarino (film director) =

Italian film director (1885–1963)

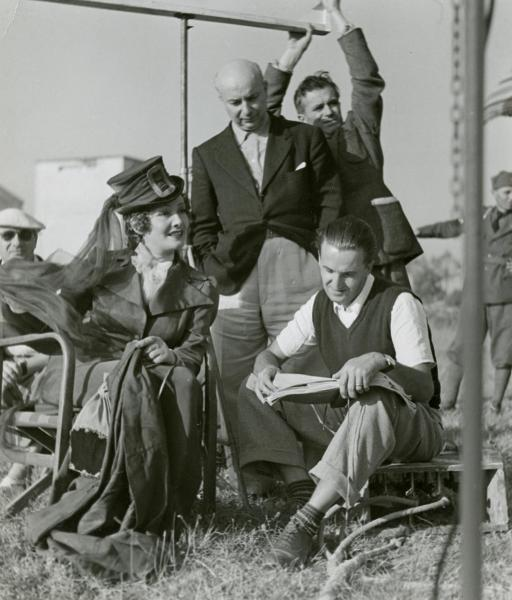
- Sul set del film "Fra Diavolo" - Zampa, Luigi, 1942 - Laura Nucci, a sinistra seduta, guarda verso destra. Di fianco seduto, il regista Luigi Zampa legge dei fogli. Dietro, Giuseppe Guarino li osserva. Attorno, altri operatori non identificati.
- Born: 27 January 1885; Alexandria; Egypt
- Died: 12 February 1963 (aged 78); Rome; Italy
- Other name: Guarino Glavany
- Occupations: Screenwriter, Film director, Film producer
- Years active: 1917–1960

Giuseppe Guarino (27 January 1885 – 13 February 1963) was an Italian film director, producer and screenwriter. He directed his first film La serata di gala di Titina in 1917 during the silent era. During the late 1920s, he worked in the British film industry, but worked for most of his career on Italian films. He is sometimes credited as Guarino Glavany.

== Selected filmography ==
=== Director ===
- Downstream (1929)
- An Obvious Situation (1930)
- The Accomplice (1932)
- The Darling of His Concierge (1934)
- Guest for One Night (1939)
- Tragic Serenade (1951)

=== Screenwriter ===
- The Inseparables (1929)
- I Want to Live with Letizia (1938)
- The Woman of Ice (1960)

== Bibliography ==
- Low, Rachel. The History of British Film: Volume IV, 1918–1929. Routledge, 1997.
