= Arms and the Man (1932 film) =

1932 British film by Cecil Lewis

- Feature on the film in Picture Show (28 January 1933)
- Directed by: Cecil Lewis
- Written by: George Bernard Shaw; Cecil Lewis
- Starring: Barry Jones; Maurice Colbourne; Anne Grey
- Cinematography: Jack E. Cox
- Production company: British International Pictures
- Release date: 1932
- Running time: 87 minutes
- Country: United Kingdom
- Language: English

Arms and the Man is a 1932 British film directed by Cecil Lewis and starring Barry Jones, Maurice Colbourne and Anne Grey. It was written by George Bernard Shaw and Lewis based on Shaw's 1894 play Arms and the Man.

== Cast ==
- Barry Jones as Captain Bluntschli
- Maurice Colbourne as Major Sergius Saranoff
- Anne Grey as Raina Petkoff
- Madeleine Angela Clinton-Baddeley as Louka
- Frederick Lloyd as Major Paul Petkoff
- Margaret Scudamore as Catherine Petkoff
- Wallace Evenett as Nicola
- Charles Morton as Plechanoff

== Reception ==
Film Weekly wrote: "A good screened play, with excellent acting by Barry Jones, Anne Grey, Maurice Colbourne, and Frederick Lloyd. If viewed simply as a straightforward transcription of a Shavian comedy, it justifies itself by retaining much of the wit and irony of the original. ... The cast cast spent several weeks on location in the Welsh village of Beddgelert, near Snowdon, for the scenes representing the Bulgarian district in the film. The Welsh mountains were considered to be the nearest approach to Bulgarian scenery available."

Kine Weekly wrote: "George Bernard Shaw's literary standing is admitted; his command of satire and irony in debunking high-falutin' romanticised heroics, and the wit of his dialogue, are outside criticism, and this picture gives them full value. That these qualities happen to be ones which do not count for very much in filmcraft is a consideration of the first importance, however, and those who feel that a classic in one medium can be adequately presented in another will not be strengthened in their belief by this effort. ... Cecil Lewis's task as director has been competently done, and he has achieved in a straightforward way the work of translating into screen terms a play which was never designed for that form of expression."

Picture Show wrote: "The stagey presentation of this picture, with its lack of action and flood of G. B. Shaw's eloquence, makes it a trifle tedious. The players do their best."
