= T. Hayes Hunter =

American film director (1884–1944)

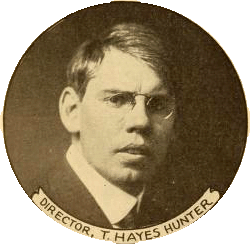
- Hunter in 1916
- Born: December 1, 1884; Philadelphia, Pennsylvania
- Died: April 14, 1944 (aged 59); London, England
- Occupation: Film director
- Years active: 1912-1934

Thomas Hayes Hunter (December 1, 1884 – April 14, 1944) was an American film director and producer of the silent era. He directed a total of 34 films between 1912 and 1934.

== Early career ==
Hayes was born on December 1, 1884, in Philadelphia, Pennsylvania to Thomas and Margaret Hunter. He was the husband of actress Millicent Evans from 1919 to 1944 and the stepfather of screenwriter John Hunter.

He entered the film industry in the early 1910s. His career started with the production of several photodramas in which he later transitioned to directing a large number of melodramas.

He broke into the scene after directing for a number of theatrical firms including David Belasco and Klaw and Erlanger. He later became the chief producer of the Biograph Company, where he worked for a few years until resigning in 1914. One of his unfinished films, rediscovered by the Museum of Modern Art, is Lime Kiln Field Day (1913), starring Bert Williams. Colonial Productions quickly picked up Hunter to direct a number of smaller films.

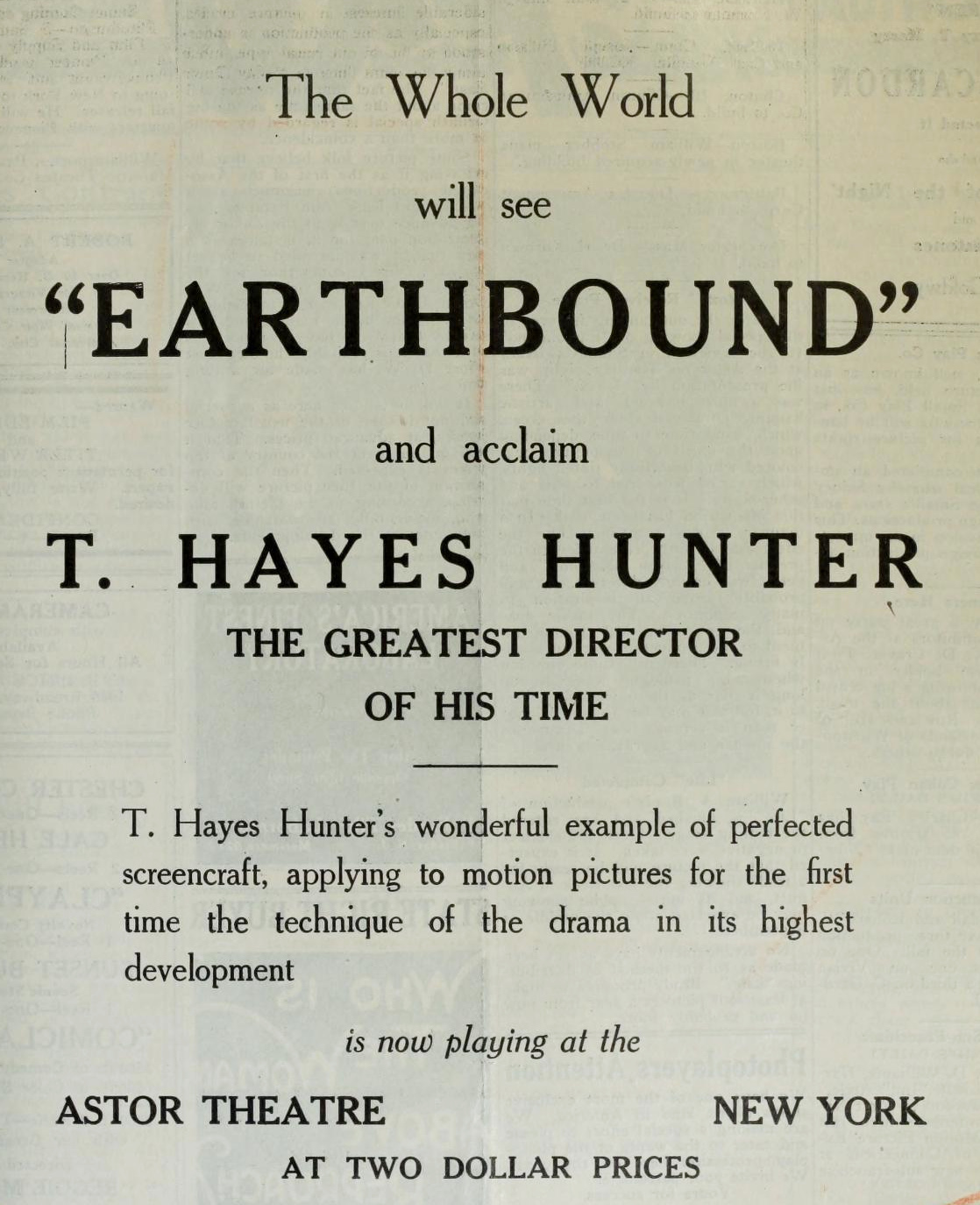
Ad for T. Hayes Hunter's Earthbound

== Major role in film ==
In 1916 Hunter directed his first major film The Crimson Stain Mystery. This was the start to a relatively long and successful journey for Hunter. In 1919, for Zane Grey Pictures, Hunter directed Desert Gold. He had previously directed another Zane Grey film The Border Legion for Samuel Goldwyn in 1918. In 1919 Goldwyn Pictures Corporation added T. Hayes Hunter to its roster of directors.

Hunter went on to patent a frame design for film that allowed for advertisements to be shown in the corners of the frame without disrupting the film itself. This served as one of the earliest examples of advertising that utilizes screen space.

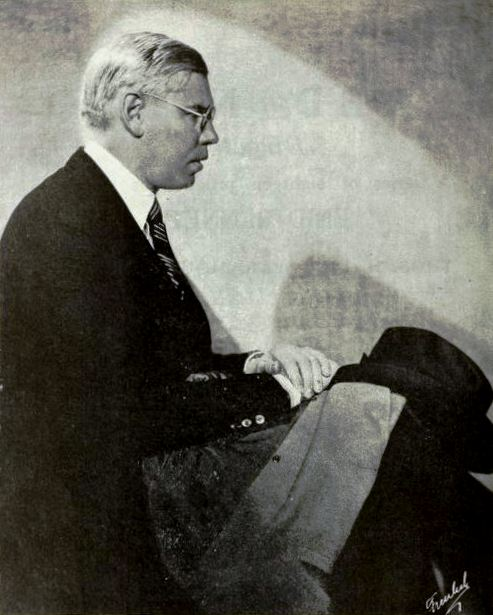
Hunter in April 1921

When his contract with Goldwyn expired in the late 1920s, he began working for The Dial Company. During this time, the Dial Company was in the process of setting up a deal with Merrill Publishing Company to produce a series of film based on the Irving Bachellar novels. The Dial Company chose Hunter to direct these films, which resulted in two of his most well known works, Earthbound and The Light in the Clearing. Praised for his use of double exposure in Earthbound, people raved that Earthbound was the “most remarkable achievement since the birth of the Celluloid Drama” and one of the most “masterful sensations of the screen.” With a long list of achievements accredited to his name, Hunter continued to create popular works. He directed the notable film, Damaged Hearts, which was released early March 1924. His success progressed even further with a film titled Recoil, which was released April of the same year.

== Later career ==
In 1927, Hunter made a drastic career change and left Hollywood. With intent to bring his talents overseas he moved to Great Britain. In 1933, he directed perhaps his most enduring film, a British horror film titled The Ghoul. The film, based on the play/novel written by Dr. Frank King and Leonard J. Hines., starred Boris Karloff. In 1934, Hunter went on to direct a few more films such as Warn London and The Green Pack. He retired from his film career later that year and died of a heart attack on April 14, 1944, in London, England.

== Selected filmography ==
- Lime Kiln Field Day (1913) unfinished film starring Bert Williams
- The Vampire's Trail (1914)
- The Crimson Stain Mystery (1916)
- Desert Gold (1919)
- Earthbound (1920)
- The Light in the Clearing (1921)
- Trouping with Ellen (1924)
- Damaged Hearts (1924)
- The Sky Raider (1925)
- Wildfire (1925)
- One of the Best (1927)
- A South Sea Bubble (1928)
- The Triumph of the Scarlet Pimpernel (1928)
- The Silver King (1929)
- The Calendar (1931)
- The Man They Couldn't Arrest (1931)
- Criminal at Large (aka The Frightened Lady) (1932)
- White Face (1932)
- Sally Bishop (1932)
- The Ghoul (1933)
- Warn London (1934)
- The Green Pack (1934)
- Josser on the Farm (1934)
