= Sunday Wilshin =

British actress and radio producer (1905–1991)

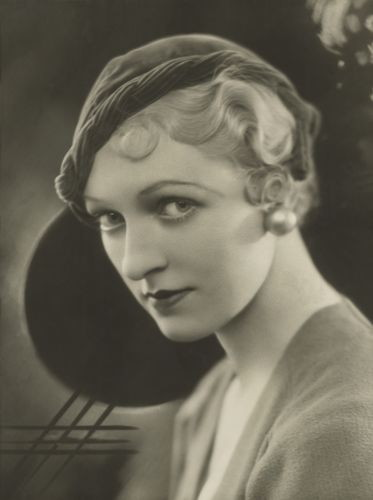
Sunday Wilshin, by Bassano, vintage print, late 1932

Sunday Wilshin (26 February 1905 – 19 March 1991) was a British actress and radio producer; the successor to George Orwell on his resignation in 1943. She was born in London as Mary Aline Wilshin (corroborated by publicly available birth records; other sources give Sunday/ Sundae Mary Aline Horne (-) Wilshin) and educated at the Italia Conti Stage School. Wilshin was a member of the 'Bright young things' of the 1920s, and a close friend of the actress Cyllene Moxon and of author (and former actress) Noel Streatfeild. In connection with the 'bright young things', Wilshin commonly appears in accounts of a gathering whereat she was assaulted by the silent film actress Brenda Dean Paul.

== Selected filmography ==
- The Green Caravan (1922)
- Pages of Life (1922)
- Petticoat Loose (1922)
- Hutch Stirs 'em Up (1923)
- Champagne (1928)
- An Obvious Situation (1930)
- The Chance of a Night Time (1931)
- Michael and Mary (1931)
- Nine till Six (1932)
- Collision (1932)
- The Love Contract (1932)
- Dance Pretty Lady (1932)
- Marry Me (1932)
- To Brighton with Gladys (1933)
- As Good as New (1933)
- Borrowed Clothes (1934)
- Murder by Rope (1936)
- First Night (1937)

== Bibliography ==
- Low, Rachael. The History of British Film. Volume VII. Routledge, 1997.
- Sutton, David R. A chorus of raspberries: British film comedy 1929–1939. University of Exeter Press, 2000.
