= Elizabeth Myers (author) =

British novelist and short story writer (1912–1947)

Elizabeth Myers (1912–1947) was a British novelist and short story writer. She is remembered in particular for her novel A Well Full of Leaves.

== Life and work ==
Elizabeth Myers was born in Manchester on 23 December 1912. Both her parents were of Irish descent. Thanks to a scholarship, she attended Notre Dame High School in Manchester where she received encouragement to write. She left school at age 14. In 1931, she and her mother and sister moved to London where she worked as a secretary in Fleet Street. In 1938, she was diagnosed with tuberculosis and spent time in a TB sanatorium. She was already writing novels and publishing short stories in newspapers and magazines when she became friends with the author and poet Eleanor Farjeon, (who in 1957 edited a commemorative text dedicated to Myers), and with Arthur Waugh, father of the writer Evelyn Waugh.

In 1943, she married Littleton Charles Powys, a former head of Sherborne Preparatory School and went to live in Sherborne, Dorset. The same year, her novel A Well Full of Leaves, a story of the effect of an abusive mother on her children, was published. It sold well despite critical contention, was reprinted several times and has been republished by Persephone Books.

Myers died of tuberculosis at her home in Sherborne, Dorset, when she was only 34. In her short life, despite her illness, she published three very different novels: A Well Full of Leaves, The Basilisk of St. James's, and Mrs. Christopher. She also published short story collections including: Lost in London and other short stories, The Donkey and the Stars and other short stories, The Public Entertainer and other stories, Good Beds -- men only and Thirty Stories. A prolific author she published many individual short stories in newspapers and magazines and some were aired on the radio.

Myers travelled to the United States with her husband and spent six months in Arizona towards the end of her life. She worked on what would have been her fourth novel there, titled The Governor. The novel unfinished, Myers died soon after her return to England.

Myers died on 24 May 1947. Her literary archives are held at the Harry Ransom Center. Because of her fondness for public libraries, her husband donated many of her books to the Dorset County library.
