= The Woman in Question =

- Directed by: Anthony Asquith
- Written by: John Cresswell; Joseph Janni
- Produced by: Teddy Baird
- Starring: Jean Kent; Dirk Bogarde; John McCallum; Susan Shaw; Hermione Baddeley; Charles Victor; Duncan Macrae; Lana Morris; Joe Linnane; Vida Hope
- Cinematography: Desmond Dickinson
- Edited by: John D. Guthridge
- Music by: John Wooldridge
- Production companies: J. Arthur Rank Organisation; Javelin Films; Vic Films Productions
- Distributed by: General Film Distributors
- Release date: 3 October 1950 (United Kingdom)
- Running time: 88 minutes
- Country: United Kingdom
- Language: English
- Budget: £129,986
- Box office: £130,000

The Woman in Question (released in the US as Five Angles on Murder) is a 1950 British murder mystery film directed by Anthony Asquith and starring Jean Kent, Dirk Bogarde and John McCallum. It was written by John Cresswell and Joseph Janni. After a woman is murdered, the complex and very different ways in which she is seen by several people are examined.

It was loosely adapted into the 1954 Indian film Andha Naal.

== Plot ==
Widow Agnes Huston is found murdered at her house. As Superintendent Lodge and Inspector Butler question her friends and neighbours, flashback scenes play out widely differing interpretations of the dead woman and her behaviour.

Neighbour Mrs Finch tells Lodge that Agnes was a gentlewoman whereas her sister, Catherine Taylor, is rude and obnoxious. According to Mrs Finch, the two sisters once had an argument about Agnes's husband having an affair with Catherine. Catherine then left after hurting Agnes's feelings. A few days later, Catherine and her boyfriend, Bob Baker, forced their way into Agnes's flat. Finch ran to get the help of Mr Pollard, the timid owner of a pet shop opposite the building. Catherine and Baker threatened to kill everyone and left. This leads Lodge to question Catherine.

Catherine claims that the day she visited her sister, Mrs Finch gave her a bad welcome. According to Catherine, Agnes was a drunk, rude and not-very-pleasant-looking woman. Catherine told Agnes that she went to visit Charles, however, Agnes accused her and Charles of having an affair. They argue and Catherine leaves in contempt. She admits to dating Bob Baker and visiting Agnes in his company, however, Mrs Finch refused to let them in.

Baker admits to meeting Agnes at her workplace, where she is a fortune teller. He, being a magician by profession, gave her a script for a mentalism act for her to go through, which she agreed to learn, but then ignored. He visited her again two days later and Agnes attempted to seduce him, throwing him out when he refused. The day when he and Catherine went to visit Agnes, she treated them disrespectfully and asked them to get out.

Albert Pollard, the pet shop owner, portrays Agnes in a positive light. She once came into his shop to ask for help with her bird. When the bird died, Pollard comforted Agnes and offered a parrot to replace it. On a following day, he was politely sent away from her place due to the arrival of Michael Murray, a merchant sailor. On the day Catherine and Baker barged in and Mrs Finch asked for help, Pollard claims he bravely sent both of them away. He says that Agnes had agreed to marry him the previous night before her death.

Michael Murray also admits to having met Agnes at her fortune-telling place. After beginning a relationship with Agnes, Murray set sail and returned after about three months. She immediately welcomes him and they kiss. Pollard sees the kiss and immediately leaves. On another night, Murray sees Agnes with Pollard and she dismisses his concerns, angering him. He is away for three more months of sailing. Having promised to write to her, but not having done so, he arrives at her house, to see another man in there and sees that she is possibly a prostitute. Furious, he refuses to listen to her explanations, manhandles her and leaves in a rage. He says he later regretted his behaviour, blaming himself for not having written to her, which he says he is no good at.

Lodge and Butler return to Mrs Finch's house to question her some more. In the background, Butler can be heard questioning the boy, who mentions that he hears the words, "Merry Christmas", which were the words Agnes had taught her original bird that had supposedly died thus alerting Lodge that Pollard's story contains lies. Lodge remarks that Pollard's version of the story is the most unlikely of all. They ask Pollard to imagine a situation where Murray could have got drunk and entered Agnes's flat to kill her. Pollard agrees that it must have happened that way but when the killing happens, Lodge switches the killer with Pollard, vividly describing how a humiliated Pollard uncontrollably strangled Agnes (shown in flashback) provoking a confession. Lodge and Butler leave with a remorseful Pollard under arrest.

== Cast ==
- Jean Kent as Agnes/Astra
- Dirk Bogarde as Baker
- John McCallum as Michael Murray
- Susan Shaw as Catherine Taylor
- Hermione Baddeley as Mrs Finch
- Charles Victor as Albert Pollard
- Duncan Macrae as Superintendent Lodge
- Lana Morris as Lana Clark
- Joe Linnane as Inspector Butler
- Vida Hope as Shirley Jones

== Critical reception ==
Monthly Film Bulletin said "As a detective story The Woman in Question lacks excitement because the script shows its hand too early: the murderer's identity is in fact revealed long before the climax, and the last episode (with the drunken Irish sailor, unhappily overplayed by John McCallum) therefore loses all its interest. These fundamental short-comings in the script present the director with a serious problem: Anthony Asquith's work is polished and craftsmanlike, but he is not able to restore to the film the qualities which should have been, but are not, present in the script."

Boxoffice said "Murky, low-key photography, a formula whodunit-to-whom-and-why plot and a thespian roster that will have no meaning for American audiences mitigate against widespread acceptance of this British import in its U.S. playdates."

In The New York Times, Bosley Crowther wrote "It is not the mystery ... so much as it is the nimble twists and wry indications of personality that give this little item its appeal. Jean Kent, who made herself distinctive in The Browning Version (1951) as the venomous wife, does a neat job of turning the lively facets of the woman in question in this piece ... We won't guarantee this little Rank film will knock you out of your chair, but it will certainly twit your risibilities while mildly stimulating your nerves."

In British Sound Films: The Studio Years 1928–1959 David Quinlan rated the film as "average", writing: "Interesting thriller; doesn't quite work."

The Radio Times Guide to Films gave the film 3/5 stars, writing: "Kent has a juicy role here, since all her acquaintances have a different view of her ranging from kindly neighbour to drunken bitch."

Leslie Halliwell said: "Multi-flashback melodrama which somehow doesn't quite come off despite effort all round."

== See also ==
- Rashomon Effect
