= One of the Best (film) =

1927 film

- Directed by: T. Hayes Hunter
- Written by: George Edwardes-Hall (play); Seymour Hicks (play); Patrick L. Mannock
- Produced by: Michael Balcon; Carlyle Blackwell
- Starring: Carlyle Blackwell; Eve Gray; Walter Byron; Randle Ayrton
- Cinematography: James Wilson
- Production company: Gainsborough Pictures
- Distributed by: Woolf & Freedman Film Service
- Release date: November 1927
- Running time: 8,000
- Country: United Kingdom
- Language: English

One of the Best is a 1927 British silent historical drama film directed by T. Hayes Hunter and starring Carlyle Blackwell, Walter Byron and Eve Gray. It was based on a play by Seymour Hicks. Film historian Rachael Low described it as an "unsophisticated costume drama". The 'drumming out' scene of Lieutenant Keppel was filmed at Hounslow Barracks using the officers and men of the Royal Fusiliers wearing 1820s uniforms.

== Cast ==
- Carlyle Blackwell as Philip Ellsworth
- Walter Byron as Lieutenant Dudley Keppel
- Eve Gray as Mary Penrose
- Randle Ayrton as General Gregg
- James Carew as Colonel Gentry
- Julie Suedo as Claire Melville
- James Lindsay as Maurice de Gruchy
- Pauline Johnson as Esther
- Elsa Lanchester as Kitty
- Charles Emerald as Private Jupp
- Cecil Barry as Lieutenant Wynne
- Simeon Stuart as Squire Penrose
- Harold Huth as Adjutant

== Bibliography ==
- Low, Rachael. The History of British Film, Volume 4 1918-1929. Routledge, 1997.
