= Michael Arabian =

Playwright and novelist (1876–1957)

Michael Alexander Arabian (c.1876 – 1957) was a playwright and novelist of the early 20th century. He was the author of Yeraz (1921) and Joykin (1926). In some reviews of Joykin, Arabian was compared to the novelist Michael Arlen.

Arabian was born in Crete and was of Armenian ancestry. He died in London in 1957.
