= The Darling of His Concierge (1934 film) =

1934 film directed by Giuseppe Guarino

- Directed by: Giuseppe Guarino
- Written by: Jean-Louis Bouquet
- Based on: The Darling of His Concierge by Raoul Praxy
- Produced by: Joseph Guarino-Glavany
- Starring: Fernandel; Colette Darfeuil; Yvette Lebon
- Production company: Orea Films
- Distributed by: Orea Films
- Release date: 10 August 1934
- Running time: 81 minutes
- Country: France
- Language: French

The Darling of His Concierge (French: Le chéri de sa concierge) is a 1934 French comedy film directed by Giuseppe Guarino and starring Fernandel, Colette Darfeuil and Yvette Lebon. It was based on a play by Raoul Praxy, later remade as a 1951 film of the same title.

== Synopsis ==
Due to a mistake, it is wrongly believed that young simple-minded Eugene Crochard is a millionaire. He is pursued by several woman including his concierge but ends up with both real financial security and the young woman he is actually in love with.

== Cast ==
- Fernandel as Eugene Crochard
- Colette Darfeuil as You-You
- Yvette Lebon as Odette
- Alice Tissot as Madame Motteville
- Marcel Barencey as Breteaudeau
- Georges Bever as Le Brigadier
- Germain Champell as Vandewengaete
- Mado Mailly as La Soubrette
- Gilbert Périgneaux as Boisgirard
- Marcel Vibert as Grandois
- Louis Kerly
- Henriette Leblond
- Marcel Maupi
- Robert Ralphy
- Raymond Rognoni

== Bibliography ==
- Crisp, Colin. Genre, Myth and Convention in the French Cinema, 1929-1939. Indiana University Press, 2002.
- Peyrusse, Claudette. Le cinéma méridional: Le Midi dans le cinéma français (1929-1944). 1986.
- Rège, Philippe. Encyclopedia of French Film Directors, Volume 1. Scarecrow Press, 2009.
