= My Wife's Family =

My Wife's Family may refer to

- My Wife's Family (play), a stage comedy by Fred Duprez
- My Wife's Family (1941 film), a British comedy starring David Tomlinson
- My Wife's Family (1956 film), a British comedy starring Ronald Shiner and Ted Ray
- The Wife's Family, also known as My Wife's Family, a 1931 British comedy starring Gene Gerrard
- Shadows (1931 film), a 1931 British film sometimes known as My Wife's Family

== See also ==
- Mother-in-Law's Coming, a 1932 Swedish comedy based on the same source as the above films
- Voi meitä! Anoppi tulee, a 1933 Finnish comedy based on the same source as the above films
- My Wife's Relations, a 1922 short film by Buster Keaton
