= Andreas Malandrinos =

British actor (1888–1970)

Andreas Malandrinos in The Saint episode, Sophia (1964)

Andreas Malandrinos (Greek: Ανδρέας Μαλανδρίνος; 14 November 1888, in Greece – 11 July 1970, in Surrey) was a Greek-born actor who started appearing in British films from 1909, until his death 61 years later in Surrey, England. He was fluent in six languages and used this talent to good effect to flourish as a dialect comedian in British music halls.

Many of his film appearances were so fleeting that his characters often had no names, only descriptions, e.g. "Valet with violin" in The Prince and the Showgirl (1957) and "Woodcutter" in The Fearless Vampire Killers (1967). During his stage career, Andreas Malandrinos billed himself simply as Malandrinos; conversely, his movie billing was often simply "Andreas."

== Selected filmography ==
- Raise the Roof (1909, film debut)
- The Lodger (1930)
- Don Quixote (1932)
- On Secret Service (1933)
- Send 'em Back Half Dead (1933)
- Say It with Flowers (1934)
- My Song for You (1934)
- The Admiral's Secret (1934)
- The Man Who Knew Too Much (1934)
- Death Drives Through (1935)
- Royal Cavalcade (1935)
- Late Extra (1935)
- The Invader (1935)
- Prison Breaker (1936)
- Limelight (1936)
- Secret Agent (1936)
- The Amazing Quest of Ernest Bliss (1936)
- The Secret of Stamboul (1936)
- Land Without Music (1936)
- Non-Stop New York (1937)
- Sunset in Vienna (1937)
- A Romance in Flanders (1937)
- I See Ice (1938)
- The Last Barricade (1938)
- Stardust (1938)
- Crackerjack (1938)
- Miracles Do Happen (1938)
- Over the Moon (1939)
- What Would You Do, Chums? (1939)
- 21 Days (1940)
- Room for Two (1940)
- Crook's Tour (1941)
- Flying Fortress (1942)
- Thunder Rock (1942)
- We'll Smile Again (1942)
- The Peterville Diamond (1943)
- The Bells Go Down (1943)
- Up with the Lark (1943)
- The Way Ahead (1944)
- Champagne Charlie (1944)
- English Without Tears (1944)
- White Cradle Inn (1947)
- Dual Alibi (1947)
- A Man About the House (1947)
- The End of the River (1947)
- My Brother Jonathan (1948)
- One Night with You (1948)
- Sleeping Car to Trieste (1948)
- Look Before You Love (1948)
- Forbidden (1949)
- For Them That Trespass (1949)
- Trottie True (1949)
- The Spider and the Fly (1949)
- Her Favourite Husband (1950)
- Night Without Stars (1951)
- The Lavender Hill Mob (1951)
- Salute the Toff (1952)
- 13 East Street (1952)
- Hammer the Toff (1952)
- Paul Temple Returns (1953)
- Sea Devils (1953)
- The Captain's Paradise (1953)
- Innocents in Paris (1953)
- Always a Bride (1953)
- A Day to Remember (1953)
- The Love Lottery (1954)
- You Know What Sailors Are (1954)
- Beautiful Stranger (1954)
- The Cockleshell Heroes (1955)
- Stolen Time (1955)
- Port Afrique (1956)
- Portrait of Alison (1956)
- A Touch of the Sun (1956)
- Checkpoint (1956)
- Ill Met by Moonlight (1957)
- The Prince and the Showgirl (1957)
- Just My Luck (1957)
- Seven Thunders (1957)
- Orders to Kill (1958)
- Tank Force (1958)
- Beyond This Place (1959)
- Tommy the Toreador (1959)
- The Boy Who Stole a Million (1960)
- Sands of the Desert (1960)
- Surprise Package (1960)
- A Weekend with Lulu (1961)
- No My Darling Daughter (1961)
- In Search of the Castaways (1962)
- Rattle of a Simple Man (1964) - Waiter (uncredited)
- The Yellow Rolls-Royce (1964) - Italian Hotel Manager (uncredited)
- Help! (1965) - Austrian Waiter (uncredited)
- San Ferry Ann (1965) - Garage Mechanic
- The Sandwich Man (1966) - 'Admiral' in Cafe (uncredited)
- Finders Keepers (1966) - Spaniard (uncredited)
- The Mummy's Shroud (1967) - The Curator
- The Magnificent Two (1967) - Juan
- Dance of the Vampires (1967) - Woodcutter
- Hammerhead (1968) - Post Office Guard
- The Magus (1968) - Goatherd
- The Oblong Box (1969) - Baron
- Mosquito Squadron (1969) - French Peasant (uncredited)
- Hell Boats (1970) - Beni
- Man of Violence (1970) - Pergolesi
- Underground (1970) - Jacquard
