= Excuse My Glove =

1936 film

- Contemporary trade advertisement
- Directed by: Redd Davis
- Written by: Frank Atkinson; Katherine Strueby; Val Valentine
- Produced by: Joe Rock; R. Howard Alexander
- Starring: Len Harvey; Archie Pitt; Betty Ann Davies
- Cinematography: James Wilson
- Edited by: Sidney Cole
- Music by: Cyril Ray
- Production company: Alexander Films
- Distributed by: Associated British Film Distributors
- Release date: 20 July 1936
- Running time: 75 minutes
- Country: United Kingdom
- Language: English

Excuse My Glove is a 1936 British comedy sports film directed by Redd Davis and starring Len Harvey, Archie Pitt and Betty Ann Davies. It was written by Frank Atkinson, Katherine Strueby and Val Valentine, produced by Alexander Film Productions and shot at Elstree Studios with sets designed by the art director Andrew Mazzei.

== Synopsis ==
A young stained glassworker accidentally accepts a challenge to fight in a boxing booth at a fair.

== Cast ==
- Len Harvey as Don Carter
- Archie Pitt as Bill Adams
- Betty Ann Davies as Ann Haydon
- Olive Blakeney as Aunt Fanny Stafford
- Wally Patch as Hurricane Harry
- Ronald Shiner as Perky Pat
- Arthur Finn as Madigan
- Vera Bogetti as Lucille
- Bobbie Comber as Bivex
- Don McCorkindale as Jonny Williams
- Tommy Farr as himself
- Jimmy Wilde as himself
- Harry Mizler as himself
- Billy Wells as himself
- Dave McCleave as himself
- Gunner Moir as himself
- Walter Roy as landlord
- Andre Lenglet as himself
- Pancho Villar as himself
- Frank Hough as himself
- George Daly as himself
- Benny Caplan as himself
- Maurice Strickland as himself
- Ted Broadribb as himself
- Jimmy Butler as himself
- Moss De Young as himself
- Syd Hulls as himself
- Johnny Rice as himself
- Matt Wells as himself
- Ian Fleming as boxing match commentator
- John Turnbull as boxing promoter

== Reception ==
The Monthly Film Bulletin wrote: "Archie Pitt as the manager is excellent and his dialogue is crisp and funny; Len Harvey is good as the boxer. Betty Davies as Mrs. Stanford's niece, Anne, with whom Len falls in love, is affected; while the part of Mrs. Stafford is forced and inclined to be loud. The boxing is very romanticized and the last fight, of which one or two rounds would have been sufficient, is prolonged to include many shots of foul hitting by the hero's opponent."

Kine Weekly wrote: "Hearty boxing melodrama, culled from reliable, evergreen material and backed up by the amiable personality and fistic prowess of Len Harvey, one of England's most popular fight champions. Romance, comedy, villainy and sport, all are here, and these cast-iron elements are shuffled with a sense of real showmanship. The entertainment's general appeal further is consolidated by excellent scraps and realistic atmosphere."

The Daily Film Renter wrote: "Developed with realistic pugilistic atmosphere, subject has lashings of good, robust comedy, and stirring Albert Hall bout at climax, hero being matched against Don McCorkindale. Strong popular offering, with big stellar pull for fight fans. Len Harvey, pride of British boxing, makes his film debut in this melodrama of the ring, revealing himself the possessor of a pleasing personality, in addition, of course, to a pair of useful fists."

== See also ==
- List of boxing films
