= My Wife's Family (1941 film) =

- Directed by: Walter C. Mycroft
- Written by: Clifford Grey; Norman Lee
- Based on: My Wife's Family by Fred Duprez (story by Harry B. Linton and Hal Stephens)
- Produced by: Walter C. Mycroft
- Starring: Charles Clapham; John Warwick; David Tomlinson; Patricia Roc
- Cinematography: Walter J. Harvey
- Music by: Charles Williams
- Production company: Associated British Picture Corporation
- Distributed by: Pathé Pictures International (UK)
- Release date: July 1941
- Running time: 82 minutes
- Country: United Kingdom
- Language: English

My Wife's Family is a 1941 British domestic comedy film directed by Walter C. Mycroft and starring Charles Clapham, John Warwick, David Tomlinson and Patricia Roc.

The film is notable as one of five film versions based on the popular stage farce of the same name by Fred Duprez. There was a previous British version in 1931; a Swedish version Mother-in-Law's Coming, in 1932; a 1933 Finnish film Voi meitä! Anoppi tulee; and a British remake in 1956.

== Plot ==
A farce concerning the attempts of a naval officer to avoid a visit from his wife's overbearing mother-in-law, and cope with a former girlfriend at the same time.

== Flipped Cast ==
- Charles Clapham as Doc Knott
- John Warwick as Jack Gay
- Patricia Roc as Peggy
- Wylie Watson as Noah Bagshott
- Peggy Bryan as Sally the maid
- Chili Bouchier as Rosa Latour
- Margaret Scudamore as Mrs Bagshott
- Leslie Fuller as policeman
- Davina Craig as second maid
- Joan Greenwood as Irma
- David Tomlinson as Willie

== Critical reception ==
The Monthly Film Bulletin wrote: "This familiar story has a number of amusing situations though the jokes – some of them double-edged – are old. The direction is straightforward but unimaginative, and the photography and settings are satisfactory. Charles Clapham gives an amusing performance as Doc. Knott and is adequately supported by John Warwick and Patricia Roc as Jack and Peggy, and by Margaret Scudamore and Wylie Watson as Arabella and Noah Bagshott."

Kine Weekly wrote: "Old farces are like old soldiers in their immortality. My Wife's Family, one of the more successful, is no exception, and for sheer naughtiness this version has never been surpassed. The dialogue of the peppy, wisecracking knd is enlivened with topical war-time references."

TV Guide wrote, "every old joke you never wanted to hear repeated is packed into this dusty, but still mildly amusing comedy."
