= Voi meitä! Anoppi tulee =

1933 film directed by Erkki Karu

- Directed by: Erkki Karu
- Based on: stage farce My Wife's Family by Fred Duprez
- Starring: Mia Backman; Uuno Laakso; Georg Malmstén
- Production company: Suomi-Filmi
- Release date: 1933
- Country: Finland
- Language: Finnish

Voi meitä! Anoppi tulee (AKAThe Mother-in-Law Cometh) is a 1933 Finnish comedy film directed by Erkki Karu and starring Mia Backman, Uuno Laakso and Georg Malmstén. It was based on a popular stage farce My Wife's Family by Fred Duprez.

There were three British film versions of the play, in 1931, 1941, and 1956. It had also been filmed previously in Sweden in 1932, and it was the popularity of this which led to the Finnish version being made.
