= Aveling Ginever =

Film writer and director

Aveling Ginever was a film writer and director. He established his own film company, Gee Films in 1931. His work includes the Pathé film Twenty-Five Years a King (1935) and Walking on Air (1946). He was one of two screenwriters credited for Barnacle Bill (1935), adapting a story by Archie Pitt. He was one of the writers for Play Up the Band. He was involved in various aspects of Knights for a Day.

Ginever directed the first film made by the Religious Film Society working with J. Arthur Rank, Mastership of Christ. He also directed the religious themed film Cross Beams.

Ginever was involved in the production of World War II era military films for Gee Films.

Ginever is credited as one of the authors of The Royal Air Force at war : the unseen films, 1940-1944.

== Filmography ==
- In Our Time (1932), writer and director
- A Dickensian Fantasy (1933), short with Lawrence Manray as Scrooge.
- Twenty-Five Years a King (1935)
- The Mastership of Christ
- Cross Beams
- Walking on Air (1946), one of the writers and the director
