= Diana Harding =

Diana Harding may refer to:

- Diana Harding, character in Forbidden (1949 film)
- Dido Harding, Diana Harding, businesswoman
- Diana Harding, Natural Law candidate for Hemel Hempstead (UK Parliament constituency)
