= Deep Deuce =

Historic neighborhood in Oklahoma City

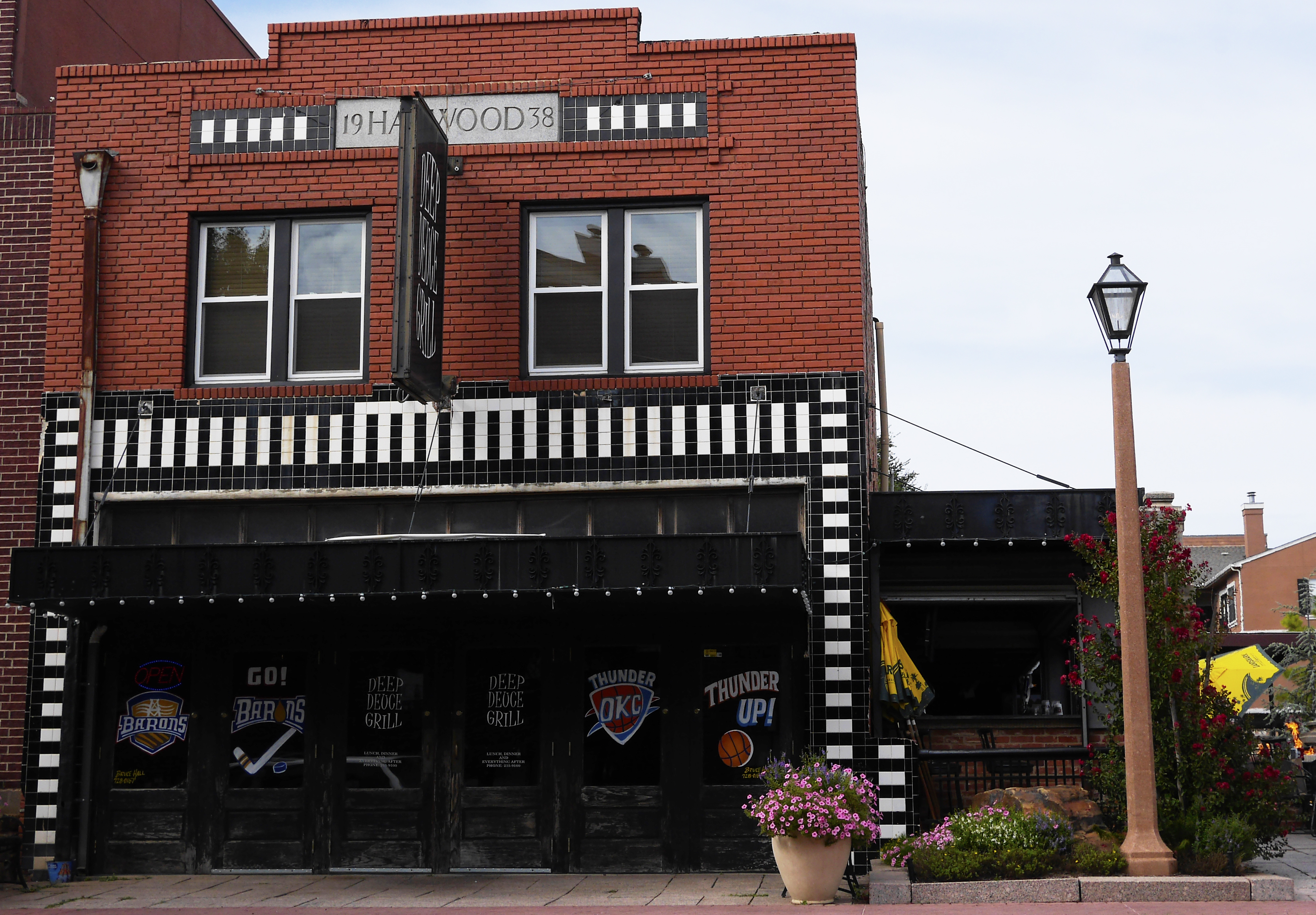
Deep Deuce Grill in Dr. W. L. Haywood's building

Deep Deuce historic neighborhood is a district in Downtown Oklahoma City, Oklahoma. It was home to Zelia Breaux's Aldridge Theater and Dr. W. H. Slaughter's Slaughter Building, his Cove Pharmacy, and Slaughter's Hall in it. Author Ralph Waldo Ellison was raised in the area until after his father died and wrote about the neighborhood. It now consists mostly of low-rise apartment buildings (built primarily in the 2000s) and formerly vacant mixed-use buildings and shops.

Located a few blocks north of Bricktown and centered on NE 2nd Street, Deep Deuce was a regional center of jazz music and black culture and commerce during the 1920s and 1930s and the largest African-American downtown neighborhood in Oklahoma City in the 1940s and 1950s. Notable musicians that contributed to the rich jazz history of Deep Deuce includes singer Jimmy Rushing, swing and jazz guitarist Charlie Christian, saxophonist Lester Young, the famous Blue Devils, Count Basie, Gonzelle White, King Oliver's bands as well as Ida Cox, Ma Rainey, Bessie Smith and Mamie Smith.

After the civil rights movement of the 1960s, much of the city's African-American community dispersed to other areas within Oklahoma City. Much of the neighborhood was bulldozed to make way for I-235 in the 1980s, but the current downtown boom and renaissance has made the area attractive to developers once again. Little of the neighborhood's original character remains today. As of March 2014, The Oklahoman reported that the area had only one remaining African-American-owned business.

African-American writer Ralph Ellison, author of Invisible Man, wrote a poem in tribute to the Deep Deuce in 1953. The area held a great passion for him and was where he had his first job in 1953. The poem is entitled "Deep Second" and can be found in the posthumous book Trading Twelves.

== Aldridge Theater ==
The city's first theater for African Americans, Aldridge Theater was built in 1920. It hosted vaudeville and films. It was an African-American theatre that initially presented vaudeville as well as movies and was part of the TOBA chain of African-American-owned theaters. Gonzelle White and her band which included Count Basie played at the venue. From the 1940s it continued as a cinema.
