= The Wife's Family =

1931 British comedy film by Monty Banks

- Poster in British Movie Herald
- Directed by: Monty Banks
- Screenplay by: Fred Duprez; Val Valentine
- Based on: My Wife's Family by Fred Duprez (from an original story by Harry B. Linton and Hal Stephens)
- Produced by: John Maxwell
- Starring: Gene Gerrard; Muriel Angelus; Amy Veness
- Cinematography: Claude Friese-Greene
- Edited by: A.C. Hammond
- Production company: British International Pictures
- Distributed by: Wardour Films
- Release date: 3 June 1931 (London)
- Running time: 80 minutes
- Country: United Kingdom
- Language: English
- Budget: $67,000
- Box office: $300,000 (est.)

The Wife's Family (also released as My Wife's Family) is a 1931 British comedy film directed by Monty Banks and starring Gene Gerrard, Muriel Angelus, and Amy Veness. It was written by Fred Duprez and Val Valentine based on the 1930 stage farce by Duprez. It was produced by British International Pictures and shot at the company's Elstree Studios in Hertfordshire. The film's sets were designed by the art director John Mead.

Poster taglines: "His Mother-in-law wasn't born – she was quarried out of solid granite and could lick her weight in wildcats!" "An inside comedy of the in-laws – the in-bads and all but ingratitude!"

The play was subsequently filmed a further four times: in a Swedish version Mother-in-Law's Coming, in 1932; a 1933 Finnish film Voi meitä! Anoppi tulee; and British remakes in 1941 and 1956.

== Premise ==
Farcical confusions ensue when newlywed bride Peggy Gay overhears her husband Jack discussing the purchase of a piano, and somehow interprets what he has said to mean he is the father of an illegitimate child.

== Cast ==
- Gene Gerrard as Jack Gay
- Muriel Angelus as Peggy Gay
- Amy Veness as Anabella Nagg
- Charles Paton as Noah Nagg
- Dodo Watts as Ima Nagg
- Tom Helmore as Willy Nagg
- Jimmy Godden as Doc Knott
- Molly Lamont as Sally
- Ellen Pollock as Dolly White
- Geoffrey Frost as Baby

== Production ==
BIP bought the rights to the stage farce for $7,500. The film production was very popular.

== Critical reception ==
Film Weekly wrote: "One can with justice say that My Wife's Family is sometimes crude and often perilously risque, but one cannot resist its broad flow of hearty fooling and its robustly comic dialoigue."

Kine Weekly wrote: "A boisterolus farcical comedy, adapted from the stage success, which is a little broad in its humour, but, nevertheless, scores the laughs and moves at a terrific pace. There is no subtlety or finesse, everything is very much to the point, but the vigorous naiveté of it all is certain to establish a definite mass appeal."

The Daily Film Renter wrote: "The script is merely a vehicle for the buffoonery's of two well-liked stars, and they, with the supporting cast, act in overtones intended to keep up an unflagging flow of fun. A competently carpentered job, it could well provide the millions with another laugh tonic of a school currently highly successful at the box-office."

Tasmania's The Advocate wrote in 1931, "this big talkie has been described as 'Britain's Cyclone of Merriment,' and packed houses have greeted it everywhere. My Wife's Family can hardly be included in the category of 'comedies.' Perhaps 'super-comedy' would be an applicable term to describe the film's side-splitting qualities, but better still it would be safe to say that My Wife's Family has more laughs than Rookery Nook and The Middle Watch put together."
