= The Balloon Goes Up =

1942 British film by Redd Davis

- Directed by: Redd Davis
- Written by: Val Valentine
- Starring: Ronald Shiner; Donald Peers; Gordon McLeod
- Cinematography: Bernard Browne
- Edited by: Sylvia Cummins
- Music by: Percival Mackey and his band
- Production company: New Realm Pictures
- Release date: 1942
- Running time: 59 minutes
- Country: United Kingdom
- Language: English

The Balloon Goes Up is a 1942 British second feature ('B') black-and-white comedy musical war film, directed by Redd Davis and starring Ronald Shiner, Ethel Revnell, Gracie West, Donald Peers and Elsie Wagstaff. It was written by Val Valentine and produced by New Realm Pictures.

The title refers to the "Balloon Going Up", a popular euphemism for an anticipated German invasion of Britain during the Second World War.

== Plot ==
Ethel and Gracie pose as WAAFs on a military balloon base, hoping to attract men, and expose a group of German spies.

== Cast ==
- Ronald Shiner as Sergeant Shiner
- Donald Peers as Sergeant Jim
- Gordon McLeod as the doctor
- Mrs Masemore Morris as Lady Hurst
- Elsie Wagstaff as the welfare officer
- Esme Lewis as Sergeant Agnes
- Miles Silverton as the commanding officer
- Ethel Revnell as herself
- Gracie West as herself

== Home media ==
The film was released in 2012 on DVD along with Up with The Lark (1943) which also starred Revnell and West.
