= The Body Vanished =

1939 British film by Walter Tennyson

- Opening titles
- Directed by: Walter Tennyson
- Written by: Ian Walker
- Starring: Anthony Hulme; C. Denier Warren; Ernest Sefton
- Cinematography: Desmond Dickinson
- Edited by: Etta Simpson
- Production company: Venture Films
- Distributed by: New Realm Pictures
- Release date: 1939
- Running time: 46 minutes
- Country: United Kingdom
- Language: English

The Body Vanished (first shown as The Body Vanishes) is a 1939 British second feature ('B') crime comedy film directed by Walter Tennyson and starring Anthony Hulme, C. Denier Warren, and Ernest Sefton. It was written by Ian Walker and was made at Isleworth Studios as a quota quickie.

== Cast ==
- Anthony Hulme as Rodney Paine
- C. Denier Warren as Pip Piper
- Ernest Sefton as Sgt. Hopkins
- Evelyn Foster as Miss Casson
- Frank Atkinson as Hobbleberry
- Wilfred Noy as Snelling
- Hamilton Keene as Capt. Haller
- Cyril Chamberlain as auctioneer
- Frederick Keen as Mr. Williams
- Charles Paton as Mr. Briggs
- Fred Withers as George Billings

== Release ==
According to David Quinlan In British Sound Films: The Studio Years 1928–1959, the film was not on general release. However the BFI states that it was copyrighted in 1939 but "not released until 1942", which Chibnall and McFarlane, confirm, and Kine Weekly listed the film on its "Films Registered Under The Act" page for the period 20 November 1942 – 11 January 1943.
