= Freddie Crump =

American vaudeville drummer & actor (?–1979)

Freddie Crump, also referred to as Freddy Crump, Fred Crump and Rastus Crump (died May 4, 1979, in Holland) was a drummer from the United States. He performed in various vaudeville productions including with Gonzelle White in Cuba, performed in Europe, and was featured in several films. He was African American.

== Career ==
Crump's career started out in the 1920s.

Vitaphone filmed his performance with the Norman Thomas Quintette in the short film Harlem-Mania. He would get off his seat and move around doing stunts, tricks, and laughing audibly. He also performed on film with Victor Feldman in the 1942 comedy film King Arthur Was a Gentleman in an act where he drummed on glasses and his own teeth.

Crump spent time in Britain and Europe performing with the Johnny Claes' Big Band. Claes was born in London, but his father was Belgian, and Claes and performed there with an octet that included Ronnie Scott and Crump. He appeared with Claes' band in the 1946 film George in Civvy Street. He also appeared on several BBC radio programs doing his own comedy routines.

Count Basie was inspired by the showman's performances.

Billboard noted the quality of his performance in a review of White's vaudeville group in Havana. Carlo Krahmer described what he was like. Tony Crombie said he was "the most fantastic drummer I've seen in my life, including Buddy Rich". Ronnie Scott described Crump as a little Black guy who had a beat up drum kit that no one else could have played.

== Filmography ==
- Harlem-Mania (1929) short
- King Arthur Was a Gentleman (1942)
- Walking on Air (1946 film)
- George in Civvy Street (1946)
- Vorhang auf! (1957), Curtain Up!, a 90-minute German TV movie
