= Marie Burke =

English actress (1894–1988)

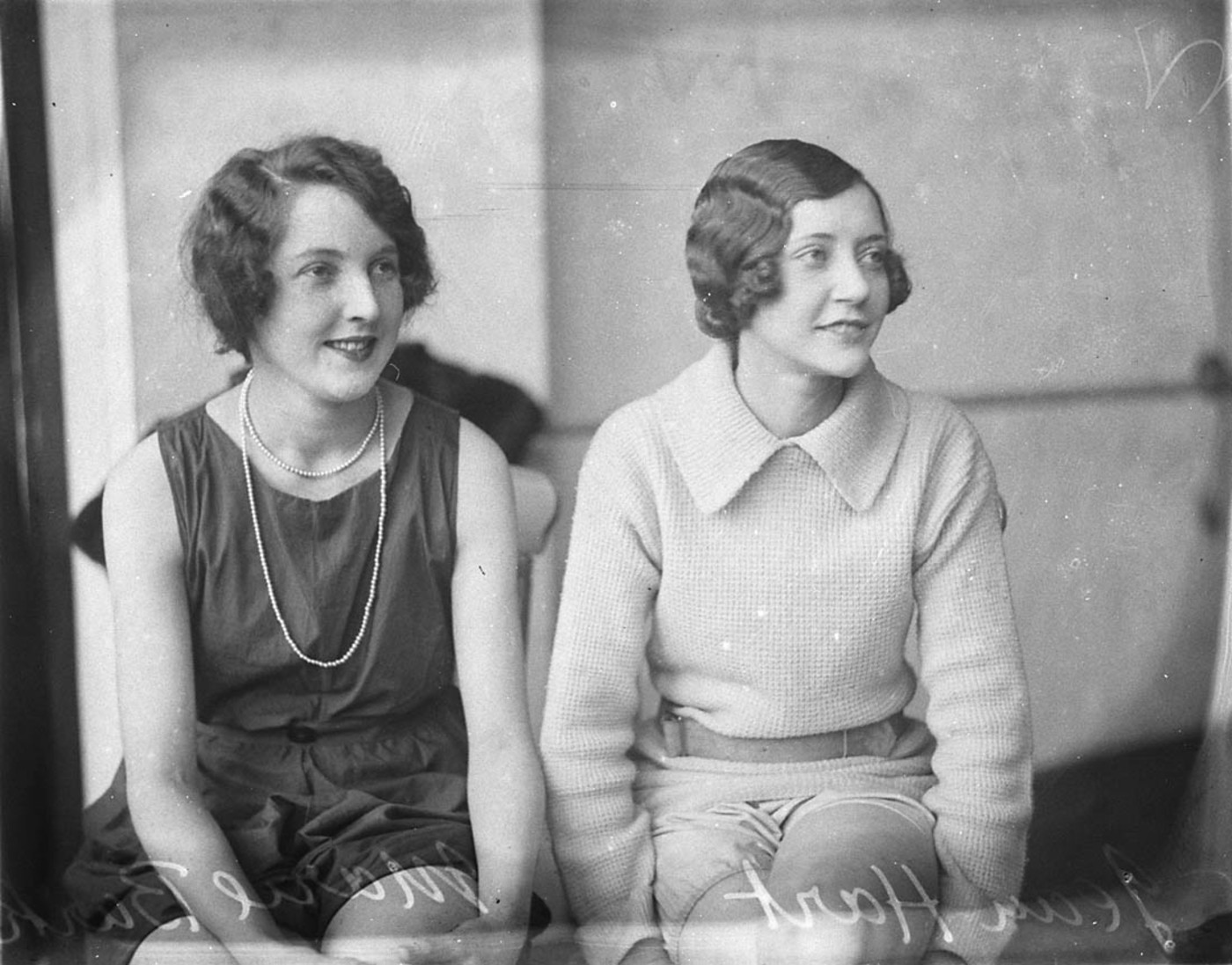
- Burke (right) with actress Jean Hart
- Born: Marie Rosa Altfuldisch; 18 October 1894; London, England
- Died: 21 March 1988 (aged 93); Menton, France
- Occupation: Actress
- Years active: 1917–1971
- Spouse: Tom Burke
- Children: 1

Marie Burke (born Marie Rosa Altfuldisch, later Holt, 18 October 1894 – 21 March 1988) was an English actress of stage, cinema and television. She appeared in over 40 films between 1917 and 1971, and appeared in TV series between 1953 and 1969.

== Biography ==
Burke was born in London in 1894 to Rosa (née Underwood) and Ferdinand Altfuldisch (sometimes transcribed as Altfieldisch). The family changed their name to Holt during World War I.

== Career ==
Marie Burke was a British character comedian and trained as an operatic singer in Italy. She appeared in films in 1917, before making her stage debut in 1919.

As a member of the Katja Company she was touring Australia in 1926 when she and her colleague, the tenor Warde Morgan, were seriously injured in the Aberdeen Rail Disaster.

She met and married British operatic tenor Thomas Burke when they were both studying singing in Milan. They had one daughter, the actress and singer Patricia Burke, who was born in Milan.

In 1929, Burke was a founding member of Equity.

== Selected filmography ==
- The Rise of Jennie Cushing (1917) - uncredited
- The Girl and the Judge (1918)
- The Love Defender (1919)
- Help! Help! Police! (1919)
- A House Divided (1919)
- My Little Sister (1919)
- The Glorious Lady (1919)
- The Gray Towers Mystery (1919)
- Sooner or Later (1920)
- His House in Order (1920)
- Remodeling Her Husband (1920)
- A Dark Lantern (1920)
- Little Miss Rebellion (1920)
- The New York Idea (1920)
- Why Announce Your Marriage? (1922)
- Without Fear (1922)
- Evidence (1922)
- Slim Shoulders (1922)
- Isle of Doubt (1922)
- The Face in the Fog (1922)
- Lohengrins Heirat (English: Lohengrin's Marriage), released in Germany (1922)
- Youthful Cheaters (1923)
- The Heart Raider (1923)
- Little Old New York (1923)
- Three Miles Out (1924)
- Who's Cheating? (1924)
- White Mice (1926)
- Unmasked (1929)
- After the Ball (1932)
- Warning to Wantons (1949)
- Temptations (1949)
- Madness of the Heart (1949)
- The Man from Yesterday (1949)
- Odette (1950)
- The Lavender Hill Mob (1951)
- The Flanagan Boy, released in the US as Bad Blonde (1953)
- The Constant Husband (1955)
- The Green Man (1956)
- Face in the Night, released in the US as Menace in the Night (1957)
- Miracle in Soho (1957)
- The Snorkel (1958)
- The Man Who Could Cheat Death (1959)
- The Rebel, released in the US as Call Me Genius (1961)
- The Terror of the Tongs (1961)
- Séance on a Wet Afternoon (1964)
- Rattle of a Simple Man (1964)
- Devils of Darkness (1965)
- Lost Command (1966)
- Sunday Bloody Sunday (1971)

== Television series ==
- Rheingold Theatre (1953) - 1 episode
- London Playhouse (1956) - 1 episode
- The Adventures of Robin Hood (1955-1957) - 4 episodes
- BBC Sunday-Night Play (1960) - 1 episode
- Danger Man (1960-1961) - 2 episodes
- Magnolia Street (1961) - 1 episode
- Sir Francis Drake (1962)
- Zero One (1963)
- Emergency - Ward 10 (1964)
- ITV Play of the Week (1958-1965) - 3 episodes
- The Saint (1962-1969) - 5 episodes
