= Thomas Burke (tenor) =

British singer

Burke in 1920.

Thomas Burke (2 March 1890 – 13 September 1969) was a British operatic tenor. He trained in Britain and Italy and sang at the Royal Opera House in 1919 and 1920. Burke appeared in several films and had a long recording career.

== Early life ==
Thomas Aspinall Burke was born on 2 March 1890 in Leigh of Irish descent on his father's side. He was the eldest of nine children. The family grew up in poor circumstances. Burke's father was a labourer in the coal mines and his mother stayed at home to look after the family who lived at 7 Mather Lane. Burke, as an Irish Catholic boy, was educated by Jesuit priests at St Joseph's School. He left school at age 12 to work part-time in Courtauld's Silk Mill. In 1904, at age 14, he started working in a coal mine.

Burke was a member of Leigh Borough Brass Band where he learnt to play the cornet and was promoted to first cornet player. The band competed at The Crystal Palace where Burke won the silver medal for the best individual cornet soloist.

During his teenage years Burke learnt to play the piano and joined the local church choir.

== Early career ==
Burke's first professional opportunity happened when a local music society was presenting Handel's Messiah. The tenor they had engaged fell ill at the last minute and Burke substituted. He received a good review and was paid. Around this time Burke had received some tuition from a local teacher of voice.

Burke attended the Manchester College of Music. In 1913, when he was 23 he was contracted by Hugo Gorelitz, a London-based impresario. The contract provided for Burke to study under Edgardo Levi at the Royal Academy of Music in London, whilst giving paid singing engagements at various venues in the capital. Eventually the contract provided for Burke to go to Italy to continue his studies.

Burke studied with maestro Colli in Milan where he debuted at the Teatro Dal Verme as the Duke in Rigoletto. Burke had a subsequent engagement in Palermo but before he was able to make his mark on Italian opera he was recalled home to be conscripted. Burke did not join the services but embarked on a series of charity concerts until the war ended.

== Post-war career ==
Burke debuted at a performance before King George V at the Royal Opera House in Covent Garden, as Rodolfo to Nellie Melba's Mimì in La bohème when the opera house re-opened in 1919 after World War I. He also sang the Duke of Mantua, Pinkerton, and Count Almaviva in the same season. Burke performed at the Royal Albert Hall.

In 1920 Burke continued singing at the Royal Opera House where he performed in several roles including the first English performances of Puccini's Gianni Schicchi and Il tabarro when he performed the parts of Rinuccio and Luigi respectively.

Burke embarked on a North American career during the 1920s after accepting an offer from William Morris, a theatrical manager. He was billed as The Irish Tenor from his arrival and his first recital at the National Theatre (Washington, D.C.) on Tuesday 5 October 1920 was a varied program of operatic arias, ballads and Irish folk songs that received good reviews. He continued performing similar material until at least 1922 in a variety of locations including Washington D.C., Omaha and South Bend, Indiana.

From 1923 to 1927 Tom appeared at Keith's Theatre, Washington D.C. where he often topped the bill of a variety performance.

Burke returned to perform at the Royal Opera House, Covent Garden in 1927 and 1928 performing as the Duke in Rigoletto and Turiddu in Pietro Mascagni's Cavalleria rusticana. Burke continued singing in non-opera performances and sang in his home town, Leigh, in November 1927 and January 1928. Through the late 1920s and early 1930s Burke made recordings and appeared at live concerts such as the National Advertising Benevolent Society's Annual Festival.

== Recording career ==
He had a significant recording career which included popular song, such as "The Minstrel Boy" as well as opera arias. His recording career began with Columbia Records in 1920 and continued with Dominion Records, Electric Imperial, American Columbias and other companies.

A limited discography is available at Discogs and includes the following albums:

- The Last Of The Great - Tom Burke,
- Encore - Tom Burke, The Lancashire Caruso,
- A Toast To Tom Burke, and
- The Minstrel Boy.

From 1932 to 1938 Burke appeared in four films, Gipsy Blood, a film version of Carmen in which he starred as Don José, Father O'Flynn in which he played the title role, Kathleen Mavoureen in which he played the leading male, Mike Rooney, and My Irish Molly in which he played Danny Gallagher.

== Later life ==
In February 1932 Burke filed for voluntary bankruptcy from which he was released in July 1932.

He was the husband of, and subsequently divorced from, actress Marie Rosa Burke (née Altfuldisch) and the father of actress Patricia Burke who was born in Milan, Italy on 23 March 1917. He was subsequently married in December 1935 to Pauline Steele-Dixon with whom he had another daughter Jenifer J.A.B. Burke in June 1937. Tom Burke died in Carshalton, Surrey on 13 September 1969, aged 79.

Thomas Burke is remembered in Leigh with the naming of the local Wetherspoon's public house in the former Leigh Grand Theatre and Hippodrome building.

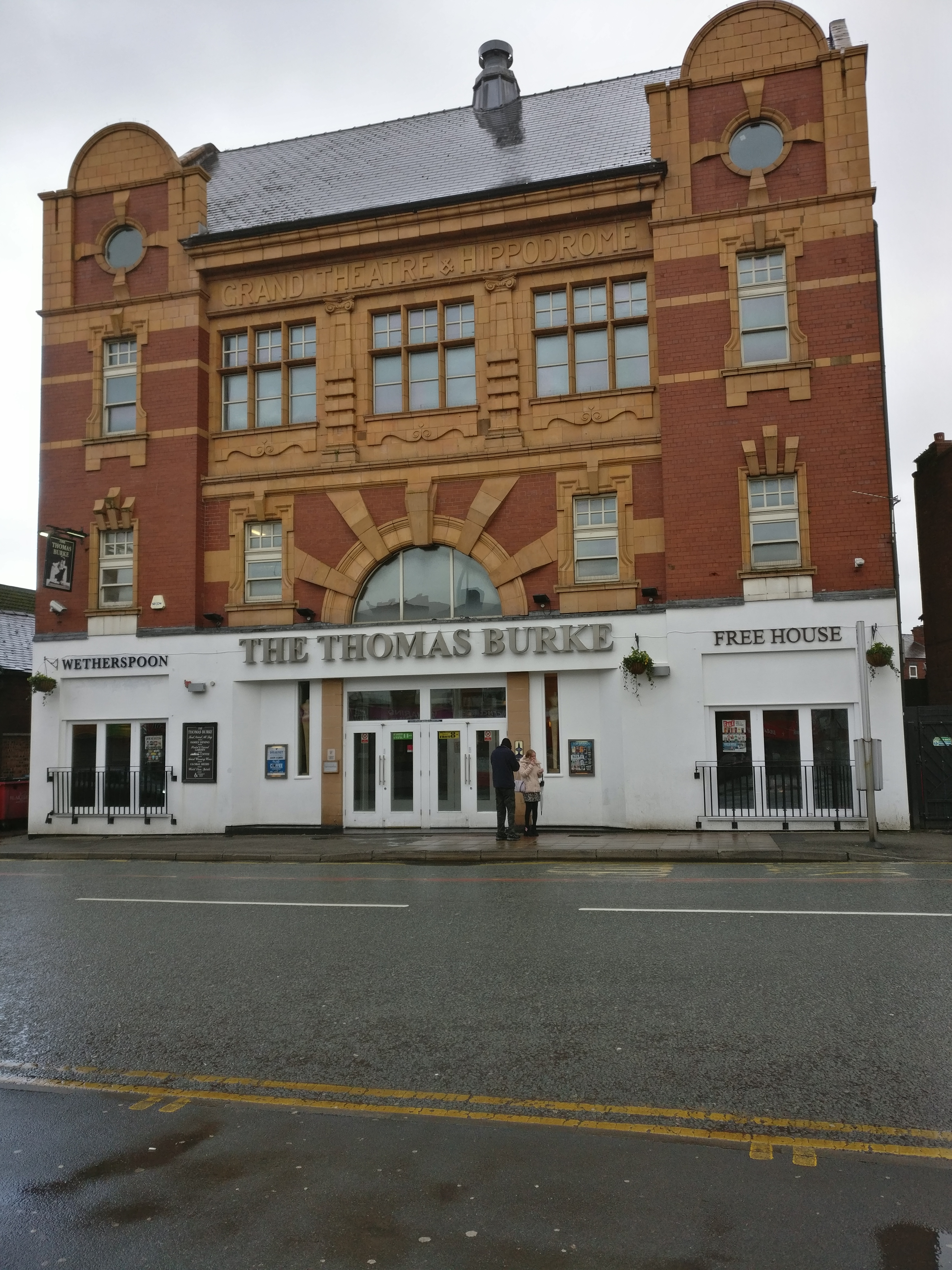
Wetherspoon's Thomas Burke Public House
