= Walking on Air (1946 film) =

1946 British film by Aveling Ginever

- Lobby card
- Directed by: Aveling Ginever; Ben R. Hart
- Screenplay by: Val Guest; Aveling Ginever; Johnny Worthy
- Produced by: Michael H. Goodman
- Starring: Johnny Worthy; Bertie Jarrett; Sonny Thomas; Ray Ellington
- Cinematography: Stanley Clinton
- Edited by: Tommy Tomlinson
- Production company: Michael H. Goodman Productions
- Release date: 1946
- Running time: 63 minutes
- Country: United Kingdom
- Language: English

Walking on Air is a 1946 British musical variety film directed by Aveling Ginever and Ben R. Hart and starring performers including Johnny Worthy, Bertie Jarrett, Sonny Thomas and Ray Ellington. It was written by Val Guest, Ginever and Worthy.

An obituary for Peter Noble describes the film as having been virtually unseen.

Huntley Film Archives have extended clips from the film.

== Cast ==
- Bertie Jarrett
- The Skating Avalons
- Maudie Edwards
- Sonny Thomas
- Miki Hood
- Jasmine Dee
- Billy Thatcher
- Myrette Morvine
- Ray Ellington
- Carol Fenton
- Jill Allen
- Judy Johnson
- Gordon Edwards
- Carmen Bragg
- Joan De La Mare
- Jacqueline Evans
- Sheila Barratt
- Maurice Rhodes
- Kiki
- Freddie Crump
- Lauderic Caton
- Coleridge Good

== Production ==
The film was made at Marylebone Studios in London. It was the film debut Susan Shaw, then known as Patsy Sloots.

== Songs ==
Songs in the film include:

- "Carolina"
- "St Louis Blues" (W.C. Handy)
- "Walking on Air" (Johnny Worthy)
- "Honeysuckle Rose" (Fats Waller)
- "I Just Don't Know How to Swing" (Peter Noble)
- "Harlem jamboree" (Johnny Worthy)
- "Basin Street blues" (Spencer Williams)

== Reception ==
The Monthly Film Bulletin wrote: "A medley of turns mostly by coloured entertainers, linked together by a mere outline of a story, with one of those night-club launching efforts as a background, provides the somewhat negligible material of this new musical. Individual items on the programme include a roller-skating act by the Skating Avalons ... vocal solos by Johnny Worthy, Lauderic Caton and his Rhythm Swingtette, a comedy number sung by Maudie Edwards and a drum solo by Freddie Crump. The film as a whole contains some easy-going enough entertainment, but technical details such as inexpert synchronisation of the drum sequences and poor continuity in close-up effects (Maudie Edwards' hair style changed from one length to another during her vocal solo) are discrepancies which can hardly be overlooked in this curiously ill-assembled production."

Kine Weekly wrote: "Cheery British variety hour in which an artless story of a pretty skater's conceit is used as a peg on which to hang a wide assortment of cabaret and vaudeville acts. Johnny Worthy and Bertie Jarrett, the well-known coloured entertainers, are the co-stars, but it is the former, also employed as compere who holds the show together. Adequately staged, it should please the majority of picturegoers."

The film was described as having plenty of dancing but a thin storyline about an aspiring ballerina who is working in a variety show at a night club.
