= The Virgin Queen (1923 film) =

1923 film

- Directed by: J. Stuart Blackton
- Produced by: J. Stuart Blackton Productions
- Starring: Diana Manners; Carlyle Blackwell; Walter Tennyson; Hubert Carrer; A. B. Imeson
- Cinematography: Nicholas Musuraca
- Distributed by: Blackton/Rose Pictures
- Release date: 23 January 1923
- Country: United Kingdom
- Languages: Silent; English intertitles

The Virgin Queen is a 1923 British silent historical film directed by J. Stuart Blackton and starring Diana Manners, Carlyle Blackwell and Walter Tennyson.

== Production background ==
The film is a biopic of the life of the English Queen Elizabeth I and had sequences filmed in Prizmacolor.

== Cast ==
- Diana Manners - Queen Elizabeth
- Carlyle Blackwell - Lord Robert Dudley
- Walter Tennyson - Viscount Hereford
- Hubert Carrer - Sir William Cecil
- A.B. Imeson - Borghese
- William Luff - Bishop de Quadra
- Lionel d'Aragon - Earl of Northumberland
- Norma Whalley - Countess Lennox
- Maisie Fisher - Queen Mary
- Marian Constance Blackton - Mary Arundel
- Violet Virginia Blackton - Lettice Knollys
- Ursula Jeans - Bit Part (uncredited)

== See also ==
- List of early color feature films
