= Marylebone Studios =

British film studio in London

General information
- Type: Film studios
- Location: 245 Marylebone Road, Marylebone, London, United Kingdom
- Coordinates: 51.52072482522514°N 0.16518298803514145°W
- Inaugurated: late 1930s
- Owner: Henry Halstead

Marylebone Studios was a British film studio in London. Established in the late 1930s, it had two stages in a converted church hall near the Edgware Road. The studio worked with Hammer Films on films, including the adaptations of the Dick Barton radio show. Production on additional films in the series ceased after the star was killed in a crash. Henry Halsted was the studio's owner and production supervisor. The studio eventually moved into advertisements and documentaries.

The Bespoke Overcoat (1956), which was filmed at the studio, won an Academy Award at the 29th Academy Awards for Best Short Subject (Two-Reel).

Nicolas Roeg began his film career at Marylebone Studios as a tea boy before moving up to clapper-loader.

== Filmography ==
- Walking on Air (1946)
- Death in High Heels (1947)
- Othello (1948).
- River Patrol (1948)
- There Is No Escape (1948)
- Dick Barton: Special Agent (1948)
- Dick Barton Strikes Back (1949)
- Dick Barton at Bay (1950)
- Tread Softly (1952)
- Bespoke Overcoat (1956)
- Out of the Shadows (1962)
- Don't Talk to Strange Men (1962)
- Lunch Hour (1962)
- On The Run (1970)
- Adam & Eve Mews, a television show
- I Was at School in France, a documentary
