= Death Drives Through =

1935 British film by Edward L. Cahn

- Directed by: Edward L. Cahn
- Screenplay by: John Huston; Katherine Strueby
- Produced by: Clifford Taylor
- Starring: Robert Douglas; Chili Bouchier; Miles Mander
- Cinematography: Eric Cross; James Wilson
- Edited by: Edward L. Cahn
- Music by: Ernest Irving
- Production company: Clifford Taylor Productions
- Distributed by: Associated British
- Release date: 25 February 1935
- Running time: 63 minutes
- Country: United Kingdom
- Language: English

Death Drives Through is a 1935 British sports drama film directed by Edward L. Cahn and starring Robert Douglas, Chili Bouchier and Miles Mander. It was written by John Huston and Katherine Strueby.

== Plot ==
Motor racer Kit Woods, eager to produce a car of his own design, secures the backing of motor magnate Lord. Woods beats his arch-rival Garry Ames, both on the racetrack and for the affections of Lord's daughter. Seeking revenge, Ames tries fo frame Woods for a fatal accident. In a subsequent race Woods saves Ames's life, and the latter repents his evil ways.

== Cast ==
- Robert Douglas as Kit Woods
- Chili Bouchier as Kay Lord
- Miles Mander as Garry Ames
- Percy Walsh as Mr. Lord
- Frank Atkinson as John Larson
- Lillian Gunns as Binnie
- Andreas Malandrinos as Crew Member (uncredited)

== Production ==
The film was made as a quota quickie by the independent producer Clifford Taylor at Ealing Studios. The racing scenes were shot at Brooklands.

== Reception ==
The Monthly Film Bulletin wrote: "This is a hopelessly muddled film, which breaks almost every rule in the book, and comes in for a few unintended laughs. The characters, with the possible exception of Kit, are not very competent, and are continually camera-conscious and ill at ease."

Kine Weekly wrote: "The plot makes no great demands upon the intelligence, but it is, nevertheless, straightforward and definitely popular in calibre. Interest is well sustained, the development and climax are not lacking in thrills, and the acting easily meets all the demands. A sound supporting proposition for the masses."

== Bibliography ==
- Chibnall, Steve. Quota Quickies: The British of the British 'B' Film. British Film Institute, 2007.
