= W. H. Slaughter House =

Historic building in Oklahoma City, OK, US

The W. H. Slaughter House is the historic home of prominent Oklahoma City doctor, developer, and architect Wyatt Hardy Slaughter. It is listed on the National Register of Historic Places.

Slaughter owned the Slaughter Building and its Slaughter's Hall. In 1923, he sold his Cove Pharmacy drugstore that was in the building.

Slaughter welcomed Dr. W. L. Haywood to Oklahoma City and encouraged him to stay in the city. Both doctors worked to treat African Americans who were not allowed to be treated in the area's whites only hospitals. Haywood went on to establish a hospital for African Americans.

Slaughter married Edna Randolph. She wrote about the segregation and discrimination African Americans faced in Oklahoma.

Slaughter Hall was a popular spot for musicians.

The house is located at 3101 NE 50th Street.

== See also ==
- Deep Deuce, historically African American district
