= Death Is a Number =

1951 British film by Robert Henryson

Death is a Number
- DVD cover
- Directed by: Robert Henryson
- Written by: original story & scenario by Charles K. Shaw
- Produced by: Robert Henryson
- Starring: Terence Alexander; Lesley Osmond; Denis Webb
- Cinematography: Phil Grindrod; Harry Long
- Music by: Escaro Pastore
- Production company: Delman Pictures
- Distributed by: Adelphi Films (UK) (uncredited)
- Release date: November 1951 (UK)
- Running time: 50 minutes
- Country: United Kingdom
- Language: English

Death Is a Number is a 1951 British second feature ('B') drama film directed by Robert Henryson and starring Terence Alexander, Lesley Osmond and Peter Gawthorne. It was written by Charles K. Shaw.

== Plot ==
A racing driver is persecuted by the number 9.

== Cast ==
- Terence Alexander as Alan Robert
- Lesley Osmond as Joan Robert
- Peter Gawthorne as James Gregson
- Denis Webb as John Bridgnorth
- Isabel George as nurse
- Ingeborg von Kusserow as gipsy

== Critical reception ==
Kine Weekly wrote: "Unusual British featurette, dealing with that far-from-exact, but nevertheless fascinating science, numerology. ... Conclusions are for from clear, but the matter, founded mainly on superstition, intrigues and should appeal to women. Reliable full-length novelty quota."

Picturegoer called the film a "modest British novelty featurette."

In British Sound Films: The Studio Years 1928–1959 David Quinlan rated the film as "mediocre", writing: "Silly 'B' feature."

TV Guide rated the film two out of five stars, noting an "Okay, if forgotten, melodrama."
