= Grace Hazard =

American actress and vaudevillian

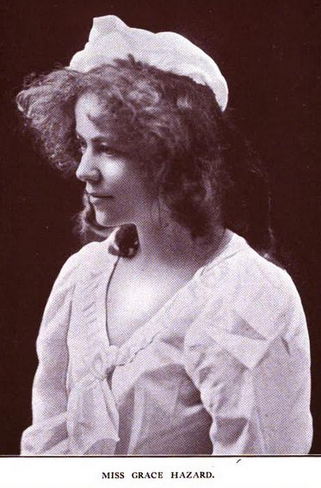
- Hazard in 1908
- Born: Lucia Grace Hazard; May 24, 1875; St. Louis, Missouri, U.S.
- Died: July 8, 1957 (aged 82); Washington, D.C., U.S.
- Resting place: Glenwood Cemetery
- Other names: Grace Hazzard
- Occupation(s): Actress, singer
- Years active: 1902–1918
- Spouses: Fred Duprez (m. 1912; div. 191?); Whitman B. Daniels (m. 1916; div. 1920) Ralph Wormelle (m. 1922)

Grace Hazard (born Lucia Grace Hazard; May 24, 1875 — July 8, 1957), also credited as Grace Hazzard, was an American singer and actress in musical theatre and vaudeville.

== Early life ==
Lucia Grace Hazard was from St. Louis, Missouri, the daughter of Dr. William B. Hazard (1843–1888) and Gertrude Maude Holmes Hazard (1847–1914). Her father was a veteran of the American Civil War and a medical doctor, who was superintendent of the St. Louis Insane Asylum and a professor at the medical college in that city. Her parents were both born in Vermont. She had an older brother, Robert H. Hazard (1869–1912), who became a journalist, novelist and one of the first White House correspondents.

== Career ==
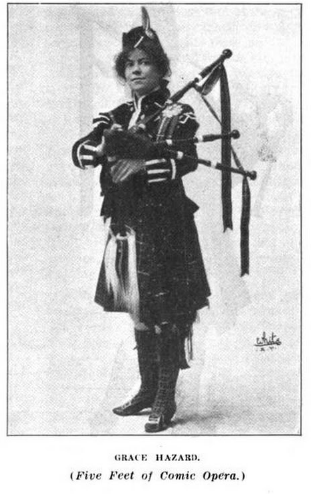
Grace Hazard, in Scottish costume, from a 1909 publication.

As an actress, Hazard appeared in Babes in Toyland, as "Angela" in Florodora (1902), and starred in The Parisian Model (1909), on a tour of American and Canadian cities. She toured with the Grau Opera Company in 1901, and sang with the Valley Opera Company of Syracuse, New York, for two summers.

Her vaudeville act, "Five Feet of Comic Opera" (1907), involved "exceptionally dainty" Hazard singing songs from various operas, with monologues and costume changes between songs, without leaving the stage.

Hazard acquired a set of custom half-sized bagpipes in Scotland in 1908, and learned to play them. In February 1909 she was scheduled to perform "Five Feet of Comic Opera" at "The Greatest Scottish Concert Ever Given in America", at Carnegie Hall, with Harry Lauder headlining. She also opened for Lauder in Chicago that year.

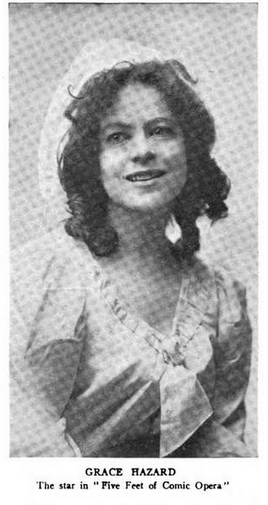
Grace Hazard, from a 1909 publication.

In 1910, she was listed among the "very few, really high-class artists" in vaudeville, along with Cecilia Loftus, Vesta Tilley, Harry Lauder, Albert Chevalier, and the duo Cressy and Dane. Hazard was still touring with "Five Feet of Comic Opera" in 1912, with additional dance and musical elements. In 1918 she performed at a wartime benefit for the American Red Cross.

== Personal life ==
Grace Hazard eloped to marry fellow vaudevillian Fred Duprez in 1912, in London. The marriage did not last; Duprez was remarried in 1916. Hazard then married Whitman B. Daniels in 1916, but were divorced by 1920. Around 1922, she married Ralph Wormelle. Grace died in Washington, D.C., on July 8, 1957, and is buried in Glenwood Cemetery.
