= The Man from Yesterday (1949 film) =

- Opening titles
- Directed by: Oswald Mitchell
- Written by: John Gilling
- Produced by: Harry Reynolds
- Starring: John Stuart; Henry Oscar; Marie Burke
- Cinematography: Cyril Bristow
- Edited by: Robert Johnson
- Music by: George Melachrino
- Production company: International Motion Pictures
- Distributed by: Renown Pictures
- Release date: May 1949
- Running time: 68 minutes
- Country: United Kingdom
- Language: English

The Man from Yesterday is a 1949 British second feature ('B') thriller film directed by Oswald Mitchell and starring John Stuart, Henry Oscar and Marie Burke. It was written by John Gilling and made at Southall Studios.

== Plot ==
Julius Rickman returns from India to visit his old friend, Gerald Amersley. Before long Rickman comes to dominate the household and appears to harbour a grudge against them. Aunt Doris's former fiancé Cedric Fox's death, twenty-five years earlier had been ruled an accident, but Rickman intimates to her that Fox was murdered by Gerald, her brother, who greatly disliked him. Doris asks Rickman to use his alleged spiritualist gifts to contact Cedric via a séance. Soon afterwards, Doris is found dead. When Rickman accuses Gerald of murdering Doris as well as Cedric, Gerald throws him from a window and kills him. Gerald is tried for Rickman's murder, but there is a twist to the story.

== Cast ==
- John Stuart as Gerald Amersley
- Henry Oscar as Julius Rickman
- Marie Burke as Doris Amersley
- Gwynneth Vaughan as Doreen Amersley
- Laurence Harvey as John Matthews
- Grace Arnold as Mrs. Amersley
- Lisa Davis as Gloria Amersley
- Charles Paton as gardener
- Keith Shepherd as Parkes
- John Turnbull as judge
- Pauline Winter as Ann

== Reception ==
The Monthly Film Bulletin wrote: "The story, though heavily dramatic, is satisfactorily, if slowly, developed, and the climax is kept a well-preserved secret until the end. John Stuart, Henry Oscar, Marie Burke, and Gwyneth Vaughan do their best to sustain interest and make the whole thing seem credible."

Kine Weekly wrote: "The picture, heavily tinged with theatrical artificiality, takes an interminable time to get into its stride, and even when it does its thrills are telegraphed."

In British Sound Films: The Studio Years 1928–1959 David Quinlan rated the film as "mediocre", writing: "Good idea; but development barely satisfactory."

In The British 'B' Film Chibnall and McFarlane called the film a "doom-laden drama of a family's disintegration".
