= Paul Lavalle =

American musical conductor and composer

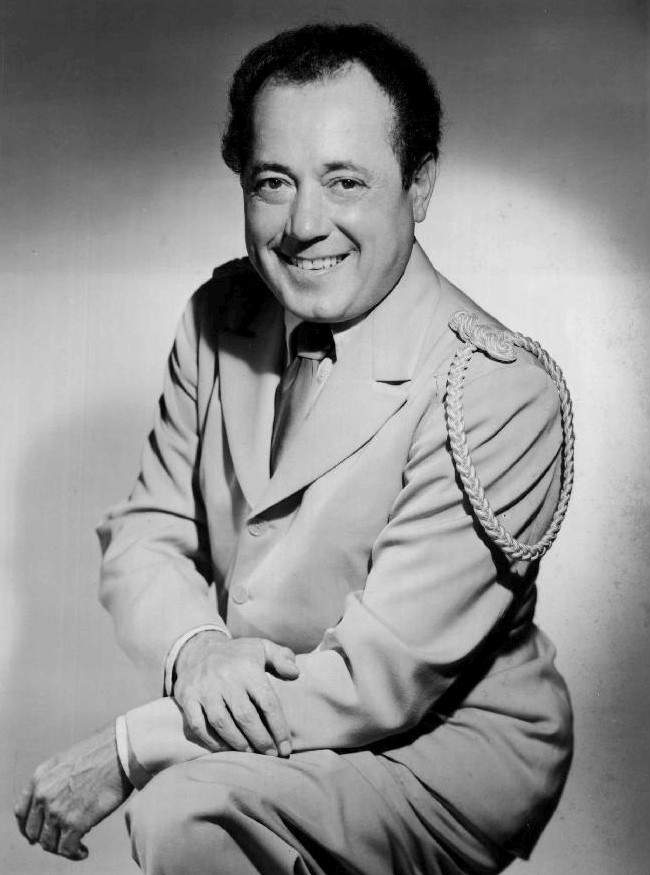
Lavalle in 1953.

Paul Lavalle (born Joseph Usifer, September 6, 1908 - June 24, 1997) was an American conductor, composer, arranger and performer on clarinet and saxophone.

== Early years ==
Lavalle was born in Beacon, New York, the son of Ralph and Jennie Usifer, both Italian immigrants. Graduating from Beacon High School, he planned to study law at Columbia University. After winning a scholarship there, Lavalle studied music at the Juilliard School and was a student of composition of Joseph Schillinger. He performed in many 1930s bands, including one in Havana, Cuba. In 1933 he became an arranger and clarinetist in the NBC house orchestra. His composition Symphonic Rhumba (1939), was broadcast by the NBC Symphony Orchestra, conducted by Leopold Stokowski, on December 6, 1942.

== Radio ==
Lavalle worked on radio programs, including The Dinah Shore Show (1939–40), The Chamber Music Society of Lower Basin Street (1940–44), Plays for Americans (1942), Highways in Melody, The Stradivari Orchestra (1943), Strictly Business (1940), The Ted Steele Show (1942), and Dough Re Mi (1942-1943). On his radio shows he collaborated with Victor Borge, Mario Lanza, Robert Merrill and Dinah Shore. In November 1944, his jazz composition "Always" made it to number 29 on the top 40 charts. In 1940, The New York Times described him as "NBC's ubiquitous music maker" and said he was "of small size, dynamic, dark haired..." Lavalle told the reporter, "Music is my life, and I am happy that it is so."

Lavalle was selected over several applicants to become the conductor of the Band of America in 1948. They performed on the weekly radio program Cities Service Concerts on NBC Radio for eight years and almost 400 programs. Each program began with the introduction: "Forty-eight states... 48 stars... 48 men marching down the main street of everybody's hometown! Here comes the Cities Service Band of America, conducted by Paul Lavalle!"

== Television ==
In 1949, Lavalle and the band became one of the first musical groups to appear weekly on television.

On May 18, 1961, Paul Lavalle and the Greatest Band in America joined singer Kay Armen in a 30-minute episode of the ABC-TV series "Music For a Spring Night" entitled "Concert in the Park." The Band opened with a spirited medley ("76 Trombones," "Strike Up the Band,") and then Miss Armen took over with "I'll Be Seeing You" and other songs. Beginning in 1964, the Band of America toured extensively and also became the official band of the 1964 New York World's Fair, an engagement that lasted into 1965.

Lavalle guest conducted many orchestras, including the ABC Symphony, CBS Symphony, NBC Symphony Orchestra, New York Philharmonic and Rochester Philharmonic Orchestra. In 1966 he became the conductor for the Radio City Music Hall Symphony Orchestra, and he returned two years later to serve as director of music and as principal conductor until 1975. In 1981 he began conducting the Wilton, Connecticut, Chamber Orchestra. In 1967, he was instrumental in forming the 100-member All-American High School Band (by 1968 known as McDonald's All-American High School Band) which participated in the Macy's Thanksgiving Day Parade and Tournament of Roses Parade.

== Joseph Usifer and Paul Laval ==
Paul Lavalle used his birth name, Joseph Usifer, for performances until at least 1938, and he then used the name Paul Laval in the 1940s. In 1938, a rare Brunswick Records 78 rpm recording was issued under Joe Usifer's name, an extremely sophisticated and intricate swing arrangement, in the tradition of Raymond Scott, of "In The Hall of the Mountain King" b/w "The Jockey On The Carousel". Recorded by Irving Mills, it was one of the first records issued on Brunswick after the collapse of Mills' Master Records label (remaining top selling Master records were moved to Brunswick).

== Personal life and death ==
Paul Lavalle was married twice. He met Sarah "Sally" Grant (22 July 1904 - 18 January 1992), a native of North Sydney, Nova Scotia, Canada, while in Cuba, and they were married in New York. They had one son, Lawrence Usifer (5 October 1941 - 11 December 2002). The marriage ended in divorce in 1946. Muriel Angelus met Lavalle while she was performing on the radio, and they married in 1946. She retired from acting to raise a family. They maintained an apartment in Manhattan and a Colonial home in Connecticut. Their daughter, Suzanne Lavalle Bothamley, was an NBC reporter and became a realtor in Virginia. Paul Lavalle died June 24, 1997, in Harrisonburg, Virginia at the Rockingham Memorial Hospital.

== Awards ==
- Alfred I. duPont Award
- Christopher Award
- Grand Festivalmeister of the Tulip Time International Music Festival held at Katwijk aan Zee, Holland
- Kappa Kappa Psi
- Man and Boy Award
- Rollie Statue (Macy's Thanksgiving Day Parade)

== Paul Lavalle's compositions (selected) ==
- Band of America March (1949)
- Big Joe, The Tuba March (1950)
- Boys' Clubs of America (Marching Song) (1948)
- Dwight D. Eisenhower March (built on the notes D-D-E; the official theme of the 1952 campaign)
- The United Press March (1952, composed for United Press International)
- United States Overture (1951)

== Paul Lavalle's LPs (selected) ==
Lavalle made many recordings, mostly on RCA.

- Paul Lavalle's Concert in the Park (1954)
- Great Band Music (1955)
- Lavalle at Work (1955)
- America's Favorite Marches (1956)
- Concert in the Park (1956)
- Lavalle in Hi-Fi (1957)
- The Mighty Sousa Marches (1966)
- Salute to Our Fighting Men in Vietnam (1966)

== Sources ==
- The New York Times, June 30, 1942, page 16.
- ASCAP Biographical Dictionary. New York: Bowker, 1980.
- ”Chamber-Music Society”, Time, September 23, 1940
- ”Conductor Paul Lavalle Dies at 88”, Richmond Times-Dispatch, June 24, 1997, page B2.
- Dunning, John. The Encyclopedia of Old-Time Radio. New York: Oxford University Press, 1998.
- International Motion Picture Almanac 1975. New York: Quigley Publishing, 1975.
- Kinkle, Roger D. The Complete Encyclopedia of Popular Music and Jazz 1900-1950. New Rochelle: Artlington House, 1974.
- Lachman, Ron. The Encyclopedia of American Radio. New York: Checkmark Books, 2000.
- Rasponi, Lanfranco. "Jazz Swings to Classics - Improvisation and Variations Gone from Popular Music, Paul Laval Says", The New York Times, November 24, 1940.
- Rehrig, William H. The Heritage Encyclopedia of Band Music. Waterville, Ohio: Integrity Press, 1991.
- Smith, Norman E. March Music Notes. Lake Charles, Louisiana: Music Notes Press, 1986.
- United States Census, 1920
- Vallance, Tom "Muriel Angelus" Independent (of London) Online Edition, September 6, 2004.
