= The Call of the East (1922 film) =

1922 British film by Bert Wynne

- Directed by: Bert Wynne
- Written by: Esther Whitehouse (novel); Bert Wynne
- Produced by: Bert Wynne
- Starring: Warwick Ward; Doris Eaton; Walter Tennyson
- Production company: International Artists
- Distributed by: Curry
- Release date: October 1922
- Country: United Kingdom
- Languages: Silent; English intertitles

The Call of the East is a 1922 British silent adventure film directed by Bert Wynne and starring Warwick Ward, Doris Eaton and Walter Tennyson. It is also known by the alternative title of His Supreme Sacrifice.

== Cast ==
- Warwick Ward as Arthur Burleigh
- Doris Eaton as Mrs. Burleigh
- Walter Tennyson as Jack Verity
- Dorinea Shirley
- Francis Innys

== Bibliography ==
- Low, Rachel. The History of British Film: Volume IV, 1918–1929. Routledge, 1997.
