= Room for Two (film) =

- Vic Oliver and Frances Day
- Directed by: Maurice Elvey
- Written by: Victor Katona; Gilbert Wakefield; Katherine Strueby
- Based on: play by Gilbert Wakefield
- Produced by: Victor Katona
- Starring: Frances Day; Vic Oliver; Greta Gynt; Basil Radford
- Cinematography: Bryan Langley
- Edited by: Sidney Stone
- Production company: Victor Katona Productions
- Distributed by: Grand National Pictures
- Release date: 19 October 1940
- Running time: 77 minutes
- Country: United Kingdom
- Language: English

Room for Two is a 1940 British comedy film directed by Maurice Elvey and starring Frances Day, Vic Oliver and Greta Gynt. It was written by Victor Katona, Gilbert Wakefield and Katherine Strueby, based on Wakefield's 1938 stage farce.

The film's Italian setting was overtaken by events, as by the time of its release Fascist Italy had entered the Second World War against Britain.

== Plot summary ==
The story takes place in Venice, where a womanising Englishman Vic Oliver takes a strong interest in a married tourist who is played by Frances Day. Oliver disguises himself in drag and gets himself hired as the Days' maid. When Day's philandering husband, played by Basil Radford, shows up, the fun starts.

== Cast ==
- Frances Day as Claire Spencer
- Vic Oliver as Michael Brent
- Hilda Bayley as Madame Mignon
- Greta Gynt as Hilda Westby
- Basil Radford as Robert Spencer
- Rosamund Greenwood as Grace
- Magda Kun as Mimi
- Leo De Pokorny as hotel manager
- Gleniss Mortimer as Maria
- Victor Rietti as Gaston
- Maureen Pryor as Mary
- Andreas Malandrinos as gondolier

== Critical reception ==
The Monthly Film Bulletin wrote: "To succeed, this film should have been very wittily directed and truly sophisticated. Actually it is long and dull, and the two principals, Frances Day and Vic Oliver, do not seem at home in their parts. Greta Gynt as Hilda and Basil Radford as the pompous Robert are far more convincing as a selfish and a-moral couple and give the film its few bright moments."

Kine Weekly wrote: "Its credentials and its cast promise something really snappy, but somehow promise is hardly fulfilled. The original story appears to have been to the cleaners during its adaptation for the screen. Still, although its fun amounts to little more than artless keyhole capers, it will afford amusement for the not too sophisticated."

The Daily Film Renter wrote: "Light, racy marital mix-up comedy sumptuously mounted. Stage play origin apparent throughout, though dialogue obviously toned to screen demands. Situations fail to register to full through too airy handling, and characters, all wealthy wasters, engender little sympathy."
