= Knights for a Day =

- British trade ad
- Directed by: Norman Lee; Aveling Ginever
- Written by: Frank Atkinson; Charles Bray; Aveling Ginever
- Produced by: Aveling Ginever
- Starring: Nelson Keys; John Garrick; Nancy Burne; Cathleen Nesbitt
- Production company: Pearl Productions
- Distributed by: Pathé Pictures
- Release date: March 1937
- Running time: 69 minutes
- Country: United Kingdom
- Language: English

Knights for a Day (also known as Full Tilt) is a 1937 British comedy film directed by Norman Lee and Aveling Ginever and starring Nelson Keys, John Garrick and Nancy Burne. It was written by Frank Atkinson, Charles Bray and Aveling Ginever, and was made as a quota quickie at Welwyn Studios.

== Preservation status ==
The British Film Institute National Archive holds a collection of stills but no film or video materials.

== Plot ==
A man wins a car in a competition, and decides to tour round the country. He ends up assisting a prince who is being pursued by a gang of revolutionaries.

== Cast ==
- Nelson Keys as Bert Wrigley
- John Garrick as Prince Nicholas of Datria
- Nancy Burne as Sally Wrigley
- Frank Atkinson as Timothy Trout
- Cathleen Nesbitt as Lady Agatha
- The Three Diamond Brothers as gangsters
- Billy Bray as Brandt
- Fred Duprez as Custer
- Gerald Barry as Kramp
- Wyn Weaver as Lord Croke
- Percy Walsh as Lord Southdown

== Reception ==
The Monthly Film Bulletin wrote: "The story is not new and the farcical plot is extremely intricate, but the direction keeps it clear. Nelson Keys as Bert is in good form and the Three Diamond Brothers, as three gangsters from America in search of better money in England, cleverly parody the walk and talk of film gangsters. It is on the comedians that the film depends."

Kine Weekly wrote: "Romantic knockabout comedy extravaganza, recklessly indulging in medieval burlesque. The story is no riot of ingenuity, neither is its development abundantly clear, but included in the cast are Nelson Keys and the Three Diamond Brothers, and they save the day by falling back on their own wide and inimitable resources. Their crazy, irresponsible fooling accounts for enough laughs to get the film over in industrial and provincial halls."

The Daily Film Renter wrote: "Unsophisticated patrons may find the general effect not unpleasing, although some of the fun is heavily laboured."

Picturegoer wrote: "Nelson Keys gives clever impersonations of Gordon Harker, Lionel Barrymore, and Jack Hulbert, and the Diamond Brothers introduce knockabout as three thugs. The romantic element is too slight to give any chances to Nancy Burne and John Garrick."
