= Frank Atkinson (actor) =

English actor (1893–1963)

Atkinson's 1939 Spotlight photo

Frank Atkinson (19 March 1893 – 23 February 1963) was an English actor and writer.

Atkinson was born in Blackpool, Lancashire. He appeared in at least 130 films between 1930 and 1963. A stalwart of British films, often in small or uncredited roles, and also in Hollywood in the 1930s, notably in the Raoul Walsh directed Me and My Gal and Sailor's Luck. Allmovie described him as "tall and slender, and with gaunt facial features that lent themselves to looks of eccentricity, and with a highly cultured speaking voice, he could melt unobtrusively into a scene, as an anonymous bit-player, or could, with the utterance of a few words or a look, transform himself into a wryly comedic presence -- he played everything from jailers, guards, garage attendants, and soldiers to upper class twits."

He was the first person to play the scarecrow Worzel Gummidge on television in the original series, broadcast by the BBC on 10 February 1953. He died in Pinner, Middlesex, aged 69.

== Selected filmography ==
Actor

- Along Came Youth (1930) - Bit Role (uncredited)
- Ladies' Man (1931) - Valet
- Always Goodbye (1931) - Servant (uncredited)
- Ambassador Bill (1931) - American Embassy Valet (uncredited)
- The Menace (1932) - Man from Cartier's (uncredited)
- The Wet Parade (1932) - Barman At New Year Party (uncredited)
- Devil's Lottery (1932) - Summers the Butler (uncredited)
- The Woman in Room 13 (1932)
- The Man from Yesterday (1932) - British Soldier (uncredited)
- Skyscraper Souls (1932) - Waiter At Party (uncredited)
- The Man Called Back (1932) - Lower Level Court Clerk (uncredited)
- False Faces (1932) - Butler (uncredited)
- Sherlock Holmes (1932) - Man in Pub
- Call Her Savage (1932) - Stevens - Crosby's Valet (uncredited)
- For Me and My Gal (1932) - Ashley's Chum (uncredited)
- The Right to Live (1933) - Harry Woods
- Cavalcade (1933) - Uncle Dick (uncredited)
- Smoke Lightning (1933) - Alf Bailey
- Sailor's Luck (1933) - Swimming pool attendant (uncredited)
- Pleasure Cruise (1933) - Alf
- Life in the Raw (1933) - Picayune Cafe Patron (uncredited)
- Paddy the Next Best Thing (1933) - Chemist (uncredited)
- My Lips Betray (1933) - Baptiste, Royal Valet (uncredited)
- Rolling in Money (1934) - Wiggins
- The Outcast (1934) - Bit Part (uncredited)
- The Path of Glory (1934) - Karl
- Freedom of the Seas (1934) - O'Hara
- The Great Defender (1934) - Pope
- The Third Clue (1934) - Lefty
- Road House (1934) - Magician
- The Man Who Knew Too Much (1934) - Policeman Shot Behind Mattress (uncredited)
- Barnacle Bill (1935) - Arthur Neal
- Death Drives Through (1935) - John 'Nigger' Larson
- Night Mail (1935) - (uncredited)
- Be Careful, Mr. Smith (1935)
- Look Up and Laugh (1935) - Debt Collector (uncredited)
- Me and Marlborough (1935) - Soldier (uncredited)
- No Monkey Business (1935) - Chauffeur (uncredited)
- Play Up the Band (1935) - Alf Ramsbottom
- The Morals of Marcus (1935) - Ship Steward
- A Woman Alone (1936) - Porter
- The Limping Man (1936) - Insp. Cable
- Skylarks (1936)
- Shipmates o' Mine (1936) - Oliver Bright
- The High Command (1937) - Corporal
- The Show Goes On (1937) - Actor at OHara's Agency (uncredited)
- Knights for a Day (1937) - Timothy Trout
- Oh, Mr Porter! (1937) - Irate Irishman in Barney's Bar (uncredited)
- Young and Innocent (1937) - Petrol Pump Attendant (uncredited)
- The Green Cockatoo (1937) - Protheroe - the Butler
- The Schooner Gang (1937) - Ben Worton
- A Romance in Flanders (1937) - Joe Stuggins
- Kicking the Moon Around (1938) - (uncredited)
- Pygmalion (1938) - Taxi-Driver
- I've Got a Horse (1938) - Bunker
- Over the Moon (1939) - Reporter (uncredited)
- Discoveries (1939) - Photographer
- The Body Vanished (1939) - Hobbleberry
- Where's That Fire? (1940) - Town Clerk (uncredited)
- The Stars Look Down (1940) - Miner
- Ten Days in Paris (1940) - Pierre
- Penn of Pennsylvania (1942) - (uncredited)
- Hard Steel (1942) - Dick Sefton
- Mrs. Miniver (1942) - Man in Tavern (uncredited)
- The Avengers (1942) - Drunk at Oslo Quayside (uncredited)
- They Flew Alone (1942) - Reporter in the Johnson's House (uncredited)
- Let the People Sing (1942) - Bit Role (uncredited)
- Asking for Trouble (1942) - Policeman (uncredited)
- Much Too Shy (1942) - Village Policeman (uncredited)
- The Great Mr. Handel (1942) - Permobble
- The Gentle Sex (1943) - Restaurant Customer (uncredited)
- Get Cracking (1943) - Station Master (uncredited)
- Bell-Bottom George (1944) - Harry (uncredited)
- On Approval (1944) - Hansom Cab Driver (uncredited)
- Give Us the Moon (1944) - (uncredited)
- He Snoops to Conquer (1945) - Joe (uncredited)
- Kiss the Bride Goodbye (1945) - (uncredited)
- Waterloo Road (1945) - George - Pub Barman (uncredited)
- Great Day (1945) - Man at gate (uncredited)
- The Voice Within (1946) - Farmer
- Late at Night (1946) - Sergeant
- Wanted for Murder (1946) - Chip Shop Customer (uncredited)
- I See a Dark Stranger (1946) - Soldier in Pub (uncredited)
- Great Expectations (1946) - Mike
- The Last Load (1948) - Jenkins
- The Man in the White Suit (1951) - The Baker
- Time Bomb (1953) - Guard
- The Titfield Thunderbolt (1953) - Station Sergeant
- The Broken Horseshoe (1953) - Railway Ticket Clerk
- The Fake (1953) - Tate Gallery Attendant (uncredited)
- Stryker of the Yard (1953)
- Lease of Life (1954) - Verger
- The Green Carnation (1954) - Lift operator
- The Black Rider (1954) - Landlord
- The Love Match (1955) - Worktaker At Milford (uncredited)
- Before I Wake (1955) - Taxi driver (U.S. title: Shadow of Fear)
- Track the Man Down (1955) - George (uncredited)
- The Man Who Knew Too Much (1956) - Edgar, Taxidermist (uncredited)
- Wicked as They Come (1956) - Hotel Porter (uncredited)
- Reach for the Sky (1956) - Tullin (uncredited)
- Sailor Beware! (1956) - Chauffeur (uncredited)
- Circus Friends (1956) - Horace
- Three Men in a Boat (1956) - Lockkeeper (uncredited)
- Hour of Decision (1957) - Caretaker
- At the Stroke of Nine (1957) - Festival Hall Porter
- Cat Girl (1957) - Guard (uncredited)
- High Flight (1957) - Parker
- Just My Luck (1957) - Green (uncredited)
- Stormy Crossing (1958) - Night Porter
- Beyond This Place (1959) - Night Doorman
- Left Right and Centre (1959) - Railway Porter (uncredited)
- Trouble with Eve (1960) - Cabdriver
- The Two Faces of Dr. Jekyll (1960) - Groom (uncredited)
- Saturday Night and Sunday Morning (1960) - Tommy (uncredited)
- The Night We Got the Bird (1961) - Bald headed man
- The Kitchen (1961) - Alfred
- Murder at the Gallop (1963) - Hotel Night Porter (uncredited) (final film role)

Screenwriter

- Play Up the Band (1935)
- King of the Castle (1936)
- Not So Dusty (1936)
- Knights for a Day (1937)
