= Father O'Flynn =

- Thomas Burke and Jean Adrienne
- Directed by: Wilfred Noy; Walter Tennyson
- Written by: Frank Miller
- Produced by: Wilfred Noy
- Starring: Thomas F. Burke; Jean Adrienne; Robert Chisholm
- Cinematography: Stanley Rodwell
- Edited by: Challis Sanderson
- Production company: Butcher's Film Service
- Distributed by: Butcher's Film Service
- Release date: November 1935
- Running time: 82 minutes
- Country: United Kingdom
- Language: English

Father O'Flynn is a 1935 British musical film directed by Wilfred Noy and Walter Tennyson and starring Thomas Burke, Jean Adrienne and Robert Chisholm. It was written by Frank Miller and made at Shepperton Studios.

== Plot ==
Set against a backdrop of popular music and Irish charm, this story follows Macushla Westmacott, a girl caught between her criminal heritage and her future happiness. When her father, a crook, learns she has come into money, he resurfaces and drags her into the London underworld to fund a gambling house, it takes the combined efforts of Father O'Flynn, and Macushla's suitor Nigel Robertson, to save her. A climactic fight to secure her freedom leads to a happy romantic finale.

== Cast ==
- Thomas Burke as Father O'Flynn
- Jean Adrienne as Macushla Westmacott
- Robert Chisholm as Nigel Robertson
- Henry Oscar as Westmacott
- Ralph Truman as Fawcett
- Dorothy Vernon as Bridget O'Flynn
- Denis O'Neil as Tim Flannagan
- Johnnie Schofield as Cassidy
- Louis Goodrich as Sir John Robertson
- Billy Holland as Muldoon, mob leader
- Esma Lewis as Marie, French maid
- Clifford Buckton
- Robert Hobbs
- Stanley Kirby
- Ethel Revnell
- The Sherman Fisher Girls as dancers
- Gracie West
- Ian Wilson

== Reception ==
The Monthly Film Bulletin wrote: "The simple and ingenuous plot is based on the well-known song and built round the personality of Father O'Flynn, who is a father indeed to his flock. A large number of popular ballads are feelingly rendered. There is a cabaret show with variety turns, a fierce hand-to-hand fight before virtue is triumphant, and abundance of Irish sentiment and humour. The Irish country settings are pleasant."

Kine Weekly wrote: "Musical romance, a screen song album with a wide repertoire covering the field from sacred music to syncopation. All the numbers are finely rendered by Tom Burke, Jean Adrienne and Robert Chisholm, while the simple story employed to hold them together permits the picture to cover practically every other form of popular entertainment. ... The picture has a homely, intimate way with it, and it is its family-gathering atmosphere that will ensure it the good will of the industrial, family and provincial patron."

The Daily Film Renter wrote: "Story based on famous ballad, presenting Tom Burke as 'sporting parson' who saves ward from machinations of ex-gaolbird father. Entertainment bid vested in numerous songs, by Burke, Robert Chisholm, Jean Adrienne, Denis O'Neil, and others. War-time Flanders, Irish village and Liverpudlian gambling club form backgrounds for narrative. Picture that will appeal to the masses, working class halls particularly, and those who like to take their pictures with abundant well-rendered songs."

Picturegoer wrote: "Songs ranging from sacred music to syncopation are the mainstay of this simple, homely story, which is directed in a straightforward manner that makes an appeal to the family patron. The song numbers are well rendered by Tom Burke, Robert Chisholm, and Jean Adrienne, and their acting is also good and sincere. The variety side of the picture is attended to by Revnell and West, Stanley Kirkby, and the Sherman Fisher Girls."

Picture Show wrote: "The development includes several favourite ballads. Excellent enter tainment for those who like unsophisticated fare."

Variety wrote: "Producers have spent considerable in creating suitable background for this tuneful melodrama of present-day Ireland. ... Picture is a better film of the type turned out by producers of Old Erin, but it still is miles behind ordinary program features of Hollywood origin. Hence it will have only limited appeal in scattered arty theatres.... Although many of songs are forcibly and inanely introduced into the plot, they provide the brighter moments. 'Ave Maria,' as sung by Tom Burke, is tops. Others include 'Macushla,' 'Let's Fall in Love,' 'Father O'Flynn' and 'I Know of Two Bright Eyes.' Faulty recording spoils part of ballads, with sound emerging at wrong time and sometimes without any lip movement."
