= Anthony Hulme =

British actor (1910–2007)

- Anthony Hulme in 1939
- Born: Harry Idris Miller; 26 February 1910; Dolgellau, Merionethshire, Wales
- Died: 27 March 2007 (aged 97); Toronto, Ontario, Canada
- Occupation: Film actor
- Years active: 1938–1957

Anthony Hulme (1910–2007) was a British film actor.

== Filmography ==
- A Yank at Oxford (1938) as minor role (uncredited)
- The Body Vanished (1939) as Rodney Paine
- The Frozen Limits (1939) as "Tex" O'Brien
- They Came by Night (1940) as Sergeant Tolly
- Laugh It Off (1940) as Somers
- For Freedom (1940) as Steve
- Up with the Lark (1943) as Mr. Britt
- Journey Together (1945) as Chief Fllying Instructor
- Send for Paul Temple (1946) as Paul Temple
- The Mysterious Mr. Nicholson (1947) as Nicholson/Raeburn
- The Three Weird Sisters (1948) as Dr. David Davies
- Cardboard Cavalier (1949) as King Charles II
- It's a Grand Life (1953) as Captain Saunders
