= The Way of All Flesh (1940 film) =

- Theatrical release poster
- Directed by: Louis King
- Screenplay by: Lenore J. Coffee
- Story by: Lajos Bíró; Jules Furthman
- Produced by: William LeBaron
- Starring: Akim Tamiroff; Gladys George; William "Bill" Henry; Muriel Angelus; Berton Churchill; Roger Imhof
- Cinematography: Theodor Sparkuhl
- Edited by: Stuart Gilmore
- Music by: Victor Young
- Production company: Paramount Pictures
- Distributed by: Paramount Pictures
- Release date: July 5, 1940
- Running time: 86 minutes
- Country: United States
- Language: English

The Way of All Flesh is a 1940 American drama film directed by Louis King and written by Lenore J. Coffee. The film stars Akim Tamiroff, Gladys George, William "Bill" Henry, Muriel Angelus, Berton Churchill and Roger Imhof. It was released on July 5, 1940, by Paramount Pictures. The film is a remake of the lost 1927 silent film of the same name.

== Plot ==
A successful banker traveling with a large amount of the bank's cash becomes the victim of a robbery. Shamed to return home, he disappears and becomes a derelict. Many years later, he finds himself in his old home town. He peers into the window of his own house and sees his family, now grown. His wife comes out, not recognizing her husband, and she invites him in. He thanks her but departs, walking into the darkness.

== Cast ==
- Akim Tamiroff as Paul Kriza
- Gladys George as Anna Kriza
- William "Bill" Henry as Paul Kriza Jr.
- Muriel Angelus as Mary Brown
- Berton Churchill as Reginald L. Morten
- Roger Imhof as Franz Henzel
- James Seay as Varno
- Douglas Kennedy as Timothy
- Norma Gene Nelson as Mitzi as a child
- Tommy Bupp as Timothy as a child
- June Hedin as Julie as a child
- Darryl Hickman as Victor as a boy
- James West as Paul Jr. as a child
- John Harmon as Pete
- James Burke as Frisco
- Marilyn Knowlden as Julie Kriza
- John Hartley as Victor Kriza
- Sheila Ryan as Mitzi Kriza
- Fritz Leiber as Max
- Torben Meyer as Sandor Nemzeti
- Stanley Price as Lefty
- Leonard Penn as Joe
