= Muriel Angelus =

English actress (1912–2004)

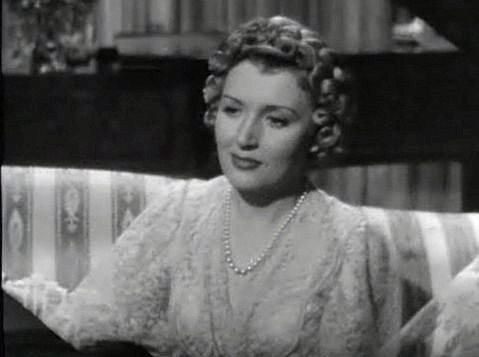
- Screenshot of Muriel Angelus from the original trailer for the film The Great McGinty.
- Born: Muriel E S M Findlay; 10 March 1912; Lambeth, South London, England
- Died: 26 June 2004 (aged 92); Harrisonburg, Virginia, U.S.
- Years active: 1928–1946
- Spouses: John Stuart (m. 1928–1938) Paul Lavalle (m. 1946–1997)
- Children: 1

Muriel Angelus (née Findlay; 10 March 1912 – 26 June 2004) was an English stage, musical theatre, and film actress.

== Early life ==
The daughter of a chemist, young Muriel was educated at the Ursuline Convent in London. At age 12, she acted in a production of Henry VIII. She went on to sing in music halls and to dance in a West End production of The Vagabond King (1927).

== Film career ==
She entered films toward the end of the silent era with The Ringer (1928), the first of three movie versions of the Edgar Wallace play. Her second film, Sailor Don't Care (1928) was important only in that she met her first husband, Scots-born actor John Stuart on the set; her role was excised from the film.

In her first sound picture, Night Birds (1930), she got to sing a number but most of her films did not use her musical talents. The sweet-natured actress who played both ingenues and 'other woman' roles co-starred with husband Stuart in No Exit (1930), Eve's Fall (1930) and Hindle Wakes (1931), and appeared with British star Monty Banks in some of his film farces, including My Wife's Family (1931) and So You Won't Talk (1935). She appeared in the British serial Lloyd of the C.I.D..

She portrayed Adriana in the original Broadway production of The Boys From Syracuse (1938), and Marie Sauvinet in the Broadway production of Sunny River (1941). In turn, she received a contract with Paramount Pictures, but never became a star and is largely remembered solely by the acting buffs and nostalgists. Her last known film role was in The Great McGinty (1940). She revived her Broadway career and had a great success in the musical comedy, Early to Bed (1943). Her final performance came in 1946, after her marriage to Paul Lavalle. In 1959, she resisted the efforts of Richard Rodgers to secure her for the part of the Mother Abbess in the first Broadway production of The Sound of Music. Interviewed in 1996, she said it had been a mistake for her to leave England. "I was caught up in the glamour, but once in Hollywood I was nothing more than a tiny craft battling in an ocean beside much weightier ships."

== Death ==
Muriel Angelus died at a nursing home in Harrisonburg, Virginia, aged 92, survived by her daughter (Suzanne Lavalle Bothamley) from her second marriage. She was cremated and her ashes returned to her surviving daughter.

== Filmography ==
Year	Title	Role	Notes
1928	Sailors Don't Care	Bit part	(scenes deleted)
1928	The Ringer	Mary Lenley	
1928	The Infamous Lady	The Girl	
1929	Mascots	Annie, Draftswoman	
1930	Eve's Fall	Eve Warren	Short
1930	No Exit	Ann Ansell	
1930	Night Birds	Dolly Mooreland	
1930	Red Aces	Ena Burslem	
1931	Let's Love and Laugh	The Bride Who Was	
1931	The Wife's Family	Peggy Gay	
1931	Hindle Wakes	Beatrice Farrar	
1932	Detective Lloyd	Sybil Craig	
1932	The Blind Spot	Marilyn Janney	
1932	Don't Be a Dummy	Lady Diana Summers	
1935	So You Won't Talk	Katrina	
1939	The Light That Failed	Maisie	
1940	The Way of All Flesh	Mary Brown	
1940	Safari	Fay Thorne	
1940	The Great McGinty	Catherine McGinty	(final film role)
