= Revnell and West =

20th-century British comedy double act

- Born: Ethel Revnell; 12 July 1896; Clerkenwell, London, England; Grace May Prudden (Gracie West); 12 October 1892; Notting Hill, London, England
- Died: 24 August 1978 (aged 82); London; 21 June 1989 (aged 96); Harpenden, Hertfordshire, England

Comedy career
- Years active: 1920s–1950s
- Medium: Variety, radio, television

Ethel Revnell (12 July 1896–24 August 1978) and Gracie West (born Grace May Prudden, 12 October 1892–21 June 1989) were a British comedy double act, most popular in the 1930s and 1940s though Revnell continued to perform into the 1960s. They were sometimes billed as "The Long and the Short Of It", or on radio as "The Two Oddments".

== Biography ==
Ethel Revnell was born in Clerkenwell, and Gracie West in Notting Hill, London. They met when both attended an audition, and were cast in a summer show, The Margate Pedlars. They then decided to form a double act, based around their contrasting heights - Ethel was about 6 feet (1.8 m) tall, and Gracie just under 5 feet (1.5 m). They toured in concert parties, and often played the roles of naughty Cockney schoolgirls. Their big break came in 1928, when they appeared in a touring revue, C. B. Cochran's One Dam Thing After Another.

They made many successful appearances in pantomime, featuring in 1934 as the "ugly sisters" in Cinderella at the Theatre Royal, Drury Lane. The name of the wicked Baron was changed to "Baron Mumm" so that the duo could be portrayed as "Maxi Mumm" and "Mini Mumm". They appeared at the Royal Variety Performance in 1937. Although initially reluctant, as they feared their act would not translate well to radio, they also made many broadcasts for the BBC from 1934, and continued to feature regularly on radio shows throughout the Second World War. The duo also appeared in several films, including Father O'Flynn (1935), So This Is London (1939), The Balloon Goes Up (1942), and Up with the Lark (1943). The latter films were produced by Edwin J. Fancey.

Gracie West largely retired in 1946, due to ill health, but continued to make occasional appearances with Revnell into the early 1950s. Ethel Revnell continued as a solo comic performer. On radio, she starred in the radio series Luck's Way in 1949; in a solo show, Solitaire, in which she played all the parts; and in Workers' Playtime. In the early 1950s Revnell regularly topped the bill in broadcasts of Midday Music-Hall. She also appeared on stage with Jack Buchanan in the revue Fine Feathers, and in the 1953 Royal Variety Performance. She appeared on television, including the show The Good Old Days.

Ethel Revnell died in London in 1978, aged 82. Gracie West died in Harpenden, Hertfordshire in 1989, aged 96.
