= Sherman Fisher Girls =

British dance troupe active 1930s–1950s

The Sherman Fisher Girls in Cavalcade of Variety (1940)

The Sherman Fisher Girls were a British dance troupe active in the 1930s, 1940s and 1950s. Active in variety shows on the Music Hall circuit, they also featured at the Royal Variety Show. In 1938 and 1939 they were part of the hit revue These Foolish Things at the London Palladium. They also appeared in a number of British films during the era.

== Selected filmography ==
- This Week of Grace (1933)
- The Television Follies (1933)
- Music Hall (1934)
- The Night Club Queen (1934)
- Lily of Killarney (1934)
- Father O'Flynn (1935)
- Shipmates o' Mine (1936)
- Sunshine Ahead (1936)
- Sing as You Swing (1937)
- Cavalcade of Variety (1940)
- Band Waggon (1940)

== Bibliography ==
- Delfont, Bernard Baron. Curtain Up!: The Story of the Royal Variety Performance. Robson Books, 1989.
- Double, Oliver. Britain Had Talent: A History of Variety Theatre. Macmillan, 2012.
- Wearing, J.P. The London Stage 1930-1939: A Calendar of Productions, Performers, and Personnel. Rowman & Littlefield, 2014.
