= Cities Service Concerts =

American radio music series (1925–1956)

The Cities Service Concerts were musical broadcasts which had a long three-decade run on radio from 1925 to 1956, encompassing a variety of vocalists and musicians sponsored by Cities Service.

The concerts began with trial broadcasts in the New York area during 1925 and 1926. Graham McNamee was the announcer and the Goldman Band conducted by founder Edwin Franko Goldman performed when the hour-long program began February 18, 1927, on NBC; it changed to a symphonic sound with Rosario Bourdon conducting a 30-piece NBC house orchestra that summer along with the Cavaliers Quartet.

On January 3, 1930, Jessica Dragonette brought her repertoire of 500 songs to the series, often doing duets with Frank Parker and generating top ratings during the 1930s. She was replaced by soprano Lucille Manners in 1937. Other performers during this period were Robert Simmons and James Melton. Along with the Cities Service Singers, baritone Ross Graham arrived in 1939. Graham was also heard on Show Boat. Maestro Dr. Frank Black headed the show from at least 1938 to 1942 along with Manners and Graham.

The title changed to Highways in Melody in 1944 when Paul Lavalle was the orchestra leader. Lavalle continued after the show was retitled yet again as The Cities Service Band of America which experimented with simulcasting (audio broadcast separately over the radio) in 1949 and 1950. In 1951 the series' album, America's Favorite Marches reached the top 10 on the US charts. The series came to an end on January 16, 1956.

== Critical response ==
A review in the trade publication Variety described the 1948 version of the program as having "gone back practically to the Gay '90s" in offering music that was often heard in public squares three or four decades earlier "and which since has retained a certain following in a number of small towns." The review went on to question whether such music was popular enough to hold an audience for the summer.
