= The Broken Rosary =

1934 British film by Harry Hughes

- Trade show advertisement
- Directed by: Harry Hughes
- Written by: Harry Hughes
- Produced by: Wilfred Noy
- Starring: Derek Oldham; Margaret Yarde; Vesta Victoria
- Music by: John Reynders
- Production company: Butcher's Film Service
- Distributed by: Butcher's Film Service
- Release date: 16 October 1934
- Country: United Kingdom
- Language: English

The Broken Rosary is a 1934 British musical film directed and written by Harry Hughes and starring Derek Oldham, Margaret Yarde and Vesta Victoria. It was made at Isleworth Studios.

== Plot ==
Ten-year-olds Giovanni and Maria grow up to study at the Milan Conservatoire, where they agree to marry. There, Giovanni meets Jack Merritt, a friend who saved his life during the war. Jack falls for Maria before returning to London, while Maria asks Giovanni for a year's freedom to pursue her career before they marry. Meanwhile Jack, who has returned to London, gets engaged to his cousin Leila. When Maria arrives, she and Jack rekindle their romance. Giovanni follows, intending to kill Jack, but spares him out of gratitude and accepts that Maria loves his friend. Leila similarly steps aside, so that Jack can be with Maria.

== Cast ==
- Derek Oldham as Giovanni
- Jean Adrienne as Maria
- Vesta Victoria as Vesta
- Ronald Ward as Jack
- Marjorie Corbett as Celia
- Margaret Yarde as Nanny
- Evelyn Roberts as Uncle Jack
- Dino Galvani as Carlo
- Fred Rains as Professor
- Ian Wilson as Hodge
- Henry Hepworth as boy

== Reception ==
Kine Weekly wrote: "Simple, appealing romance, sincerely told and acted, with simple well-introduced song numbers. The general quality of the production is good, and while the plot is frail it is freshly treated and for the most part is both novel and ingenious in its situations."

The Daily Film Renter wrote: "Picture's best bet is vocalism of star, heard to fine effect in renderings of Gounod's 'Ave Maria' and other celebrated ballads neatly interpolated into plot. Straightforward direction stresses sentimental angles, while variety of attractive settings makes interesting canvas. Reliable booking for masses and music lovers."
