= Jean Adrienne =

British actress, dancer and singer

Jean Adrienne (23 October 1905 – 22 February 1994) was a British actress, dancer and singer.

== Biography ==
Adrienne was born on 23 October 1905 in Mussoorie, India. She attended George Watson College in Edinburgh, then studied dance in London, England.

In 1920, Adrienne made her stage debut at Duke of York's theatre in a season of Russian dances. She later toured with Russian ballet dancers Tamara Karsavina and Anna Pavlova. In the 1930s, Adrienne appeared in British films including Father O'Flynn (1935) and Shipmates o' Mine (1936).

Adrienne died on 22 February 1994 in London, England.

== Filmography ==
- After the Ball (1932)
- The Broken Rosary (1934)
- Her Song of Love (1934)
- Barnacle Bill (1935)
- Father O'Flynn (1935)
- Shipmates o' Mine (1936)
