= Danny Boy (1934 film) =

1934 British film by Oswald Mitchell

- Trade advertisement
- Directed by: Oswald Mitchell
- Written by: Oswald Mitchell; Archie Pitt
- Produced by: Oswald Mitchell; Challis Sanderson
- Starring: Dorothy Dickson; Archie Pitt; Fred Duprez
- Cinematography: Desmond Dickinson
- Production company: Panther Films
- Distributed by: Butcher's Film Service
- Release date: 5 July 1934
- Running time: 80 minutes
- Country: United Kingdom
- Language: English

Danny Boy is a 1934 British musical film directed by Oswald Mitchell and starring Frank Forbes-Robinson, Dorothy Dickson, Archie Pitt and Ronnie Hepworth. It was written by Mitchell and Archie Pitt, shot at Cricklewood Studios in London and released by Butcher's Film Service. Mitchell directed another film titled Danny Boy in 1941.

== Preservation status ==
The British Film Institute National Archive holds a collection of ephemera and stills but no film or video materials.

== Synopsis ==
A theatrical couple find their relationship strained when the wife is far more successful than her husband.

== Cast ==
- Frank Forbes-Robinson as Pat Clare
- Dorothy Dickson as Jane Kaye
- Archie Pitt as Silver Sam
- Ronnie Hepworth as Danny
- Denis O'Neil as Mike
- Cyril Ritchard as John Martin
- Fred Duprez as Leo Newman
- Paul Neville as Maloney

== Reception ==
Kine Weekly wrote: "Sentimental drama, set to music, which wisely makes its appeal direct to the gallery. The story recaptures that emotional simplicity which put screen entertainment on the map, and it is told with an honest sincerity and a refreshing sense of humour that overshadows its technical imperfections. The acting is natural, the comedy character cameos are really cleverly etched, and the musical score, which invites old melodies to mingle with new, is effectively employed to amplify the sentimental theme."

The Daily Film Renter wrote: "Sentimental story of famous actress, who, separated from husband and small son, searches and finds them, reconciliation ensuing. Played out against doss house, broadcasting station and nightclub backgrounds, lm takes in occasional songs of haunting caliber, abundant pathos of naive variety, and strong child appeal element. Direction and continuity average, but subject's simple humanity, plus leavening of Cockney comedy and angles cited above, put it well into the recommended class for the masses."
