= The Infamous Lady =

1928 film

- Directed by: Geoffrey Barkas; Michael Barringer
- Written by: Geoffrey Barkas; Michael Barringer
- Starring: Arthur Wontner; Ruby Miller; Walter Tennyson; Muriel Angelus
- Cinematography: Sydney Blythe
- Production company: New Era Films
- Distributed by: New Era Films
- Release date: November 1928
- Running time: 7,500 feet
- Country: United Kingdom
- Languages: Silent; English intertitles

The Infamous Lady is a 1928 British silent drama film directed by Geoffrey Barkas and Michael Barringer and starring Arthur Wontner, Ruby Miller and Walter Tennyson. It was made at Twickenham Studios. It is also known by the alternative title Mayfair.

== Cast ==
- Arthur Wontner as The King's Counsel
- Ruby Miller as The Adventuress
- Walter Tennyson as The Man
- Muriel Angelus as The Girl
- John Rowal as The Tramp
- Dora Barton as The Wife
- Ion Swinley as The Explorer

== Bibliography ==
- Low, Rachel. The History of British Film: Volume IV, 1918–1929. Routledge, 1997.
