= Shipmates o' Mine =

1936 film

- Directed by: Oswald Mitchell
- Written by: Ivor Bellas; Oswald Mitchell; George Pearson
- Produced by: T.A. Welsh
- Starring: John Garrick; Derek Blomfield; Richard Hayward
- Cinematography: Robert Martin
- Production company: T.A. Welsh Productions
- Distributed by: Butcher's Film Service
- Release date: 1936
- Running time: 87 minutes
- Country: United Kingdom
- Language: English

Shipmates o' Mine is a 1936 British musical drama film directed by Oswald Mitchell and starring John Garrick, Derek Blomfield and Richard Hayward. It was written by Ivor Bellas, Mitchell, and George Pearson, shot at Cricklewood Studios and released by Butcher's Film Service.

== Preservation status ==
The British Film Institute National Archive holds a collection of stills but no film or video materials.

== Synopsis ==
A naval officer rises to command a ship, but loses his rank when it is forced to be abandoned following a collision. His old shipmates organise a reunion for the launching of a new ship.

== Cast ==
- John Garrick as Jack Denton
- Jean Adrienne as Lorna Denton
- Derek Blomfield as Tony Denton
- Richard Hayward as Mike Dooley
- Mark Daly as Andrew McFee
- Wallace Lupino as Bill Webb
- Frank Atkinson as Oliver Bright
- Cynthia Stock as Angela Bright
- John Turnbull as Captain Roberts
- Victor Rietti as photographer
- Rex Alderman as Chief Officer Turner
- Horace Sheldon as orchestra leader
- The Sherman Fisher Girls as themselves

== Reception ==
The Monthly Film Bulletin wrote: "The film is slow and drags – one is constantly conscious of the screen. Especially is this true of the dinner, at which a revue featuring, among others, the Sherman Fisher girls is staged; the dancing is badly photographed, and the whole sentiment of the dancing and singing rings false. The fun supplied by Wallace Lupino, Mark Daly and Frank Atkinson is the one bright spot in the film. Some of the jokes are antiquated besides being crude."

Kine Weekly wrote: "The idea of collating popular and versatile English talent under such an attractive title is a good one, but the plot unfortunately does bare justice to its evergreen namesake and big cast. ... The formula from which this song comedy drama is manufactured has been so adulterated by repetition that all that is left is an unrelieved meal of old-fashioned sentimentality."

The Daily Film Renter wrote: "Those who like a good dose of sentiment with their screen fare will find plenty to satisfy them here, while other features likely to appeal are the song numbers – especially the ever-popular 'Shipmates o' Mine,' rendered in good style at the ' Neptune' reunion – a bright cabaret at the same function, and the robust and humorous character studies."
