= Don't Be a Dummy =

1932 British film by Frank Richardson

- Directed by: Frank Richardson
- Written by: Brock Williams
- Produced by: Irving Asher
- Starring: William Austin; Muriel Angelus; Garry Marsh
- Cinematography: Basil Emmott
- Production company: Warner Brothers
- Distributed by: Warner Brothers
- Release date: December 1932
- Running time: 54 minutes
- Country: United Kingdom
- Language: English

Don't Be a Dummy is a 1932 British comedy film directed by Frank Richardson and starring William Austin, Muriel Angelus and Garry Marsh. It was written by Brock WIlliams. The film was a quota quickie made by the British subsidiary of Warner Brothers at Teddington Studios.

== Preservation status ==
The British Film Institute National Archive holds a collection of stills but no film or video materials.

== Plot ==
Lord Tony Probus and his jockey Dodds are banned from the track following the suspicious underperformance of Tony's horse, which had been the favourite. The culprit behind the sabotage is Captain Fitzgerald, Tony's rival for the affections of Lady Diana Summers, who manages to completely cover his tracks. Ruined by the scandal, Tony falls into poverty and becomes a street entertainer, working as a ventriloquist with Dodds as his dummy. Their act eventually lands them a professional stage engagement. While at the theatre, Dodds overhears Fitzgerald plotting to dope Lady Diana's racehorse. He immediately alerts Tony, and the two scramble to thwart the scheme, successfully forcing Fitzgerald to confess. The truth now revealed, the Jockey Club reinstates Tony and Dodds, and Lady Diana's horse races to victory.

== Cast ==
- William Austin as Lord Tony Probus
- Muriel Angelus as Lady Diana Summers
- Garry Marsh as Captain Fitzgerald
- Georgie Harris as Dodds
- Mike Johnson as tramp
- Sally Stewart as Florrie
- Catherine Watts as Connie Sylvester
- Charles Castella

== Reception ==
Kine Weekly wrote: "Comedy-Drama with a sporting background, which provides moderate light entertainment for the unsophisticated, but fails to make the most of the possibilities presented by the bright, but original, theme. The dialogue is thin and impedes the action, while the horse race scenes are somewhat loose in detail. ... The entertainment offered is simple, but its naivete defies serious criticism and it should get by as a supporting offering in the smaller halls."

Picture Show wrote: "The treatment and direction ... do not get as much from the idea as they could have done."
