= Up with the Lark =

1943 film by Philip Brandon

- Opening titles
- Directed by: Phil Brandon
- Written by: James Seymour; Val Valentine
- Produced by: Edwin John Fancey
- Starring: Ethel Revnell; Gracie West; Lesley Osmond
- Edited by: Sylvia Cummins
- Release date: 1943
- Running time: 82 minutes
- Country: United Kingdom
- Language: English

Up with the Lark is a 1943 British second feature ('B') musical comedy film directed by Phil Brandon and starring Ethel Revnell, Gracie West and Anthony Holles. It was written by James Seymour and Val Valentine.

== Plot ==
During the Second World War, two incompetent female detectives, Ethel and Gracie, disguise themselves as Land Girls, with the aim of exposing the black market business that they believe a local hotel manager is running. Despite the two women's inept efforts, they eventually succeed.

== Cast ==
- Ethel Revnell as Ethel
- Gracie West as Gracie
- Anthony Holles as Martel
- Anthony Hulme as Mr Britt
- Johnnie Schofield as Mr Tanner
- Lesley Osmond as Mabel
- Alan Kane as Fred Tompkins
- Ian Fleming as Reverend Swallow
- Van Straten and his Piccadilly Orchestra as themselves

== Songs ==
The film contains several songs including;

- "Up With the Lark"
- "Let's Go Cuckoo"
- "A Place in the Sun for Everyone"
- "You're a Sweetheart in a Million"

== Reception ==
The Monthly Film Bulletin wrote: "This is a film purely for the fans of Ethel Revnell and Gracie West. Those who do not find them funny will be inclined to agree with Ethel when she says, 'Things might be worse, but I don't see how.'"

Kine Weekly wrote: "Unpretentious black market knockabout comedy extravaganza . ... The co-stars, Ethel Revnell and Gracie West, work tremendously hard, and so, for that matter, do the supporting players, but there are times when all find themselves fighting a hard battle with a sketchy and unoriginal script. Still, it has its moments, one or two good tunes and no mean title and star values."

Variety wrote: "Ethel Revnell and Gracie West have been wowing 'em in BBC broadcasts years now in an act they call 'The Long and Short of It' and New Realm Pictures has starred them in Up With the Lark to cash in on a ready-made British market. The flick may do as well in this country as a similar attempt by RKO to put Amos 'n' Andy across on the American screen, but its chances in American houses rate less than that one. ... Production is adequate, and Phil Brandon's direction is as good as the story deserves. Of seven songs, 'A Place in the Sun for Everyone' and 'You're a Sweetheart in a Million' are good."

== Home media ==
The film was released on DVD in 2012 by Renown Pictures, paired with The Balloon Goes Up (1942).
