= After the Ball (1932 film) =

1932 British-American film by Milton Rosmer

- Film poster
- Directed by: Milton Rosmer
- Written by: H.M. Harwood; Max Neufeld (story); J. O. C. Orton
- Produced by: Michael Balcon
- Starring: Esther Ralston; Basil Rathbone; Marie Burke; Jean Adrienne; George Curzon; Clifford Heatherley
- Cinematography: Percy Strong
- Edited by: Ian Dalrymple; Derek N. Twist
- Music by: Otto Stransky
- Production company: Gaumont British Picture Corporation
- Distributed by: Gaumont British Distributors; Fox Film Corporation
- Release dates: 23 November 1932 (United Kingdom); 18 March 1933 (United States)
- Running time: 70 minutes
- Countries: United Kingdom; United States
- Language: English

After the Ball is a 1932 British-American comedy film directed by Milton Rosmer and starring Esther Ralston, Basil Rathbone and Marie Burke.

It was filmed at Lime Grove Studios in West London. The film's sets were designed by Alfred Junge.

== Plot ==
Jack Harrowby believes he is drawing a diplomat's wife into an affair. Unbeknownst to him, he is actually seducing the maid.

== Cast ==
- Esther Ralston as Elissa Strange
- Basil Rathbone as Jack Harrowby
- Marie Burke as Lavita
- Jean Adrienne as Victorine
- George Curzon as Peter Strange
- Clifford Heatherley as Albuera

== See also ==
- The Opera Ball (1931)
- Beauty Spot (1932)
