= The Mysterious Mr. Nicholson =

- English pressbook cover
- Directed by: Oswald Mitchell
- Written by: Francis Miller; Oswald Mitchell (Additional scenes & dialogue)
- Produced by: Gilbert Church
- Starring: Anthony Hulme; Lesley Osmond
- Cinematography: S.D. Onions
- Music by: Isaac Snoek
- Production company: Gilbert Church Productions (as Bushey)
- Distributed by: Ambassador Film Productions Ltd. (UK)
- Release date: 16 June 1947 (UK)
- Running time: 78 minutes
- Country: United Kingdom
- Language: English

The Mysterious Mr. Nicholson (Note: The opening credits show the title as "Mysterious Mr. Nicholson".) is a 1947 British crime film directed by Oswald Mitchell and starring Anthony Hulme, Lesley Osmond and Frank Hawkins. It was written by Francis Miller and Mitchell. The plot concerns a valuable inheritance, murder, confusions of identity, and a mysterious crime boss.

== Synopsis ==
A solicitor's secretary is taking a will to a client to be altered. Nearing the address, she bumps into a stranger and after finds a body (who turns out to be the client) lying murdered. The police find a note pinned to the dead man signed by a "V.L.S.". Mr Nicholson (V.L.S.) is approached by the police and he takes up the case.

== Cast ==
- Anthony Hulme as Nicholson / Raeburn
- Lesley Osmond as Peggy Dundas
- Frank Hawkins as Inspector Morley
- Andrew Laurence as Waring
- Douglas Stewart as Seymour
- George Bishop as Mr Browne
- Josie Bradley as Freda
- Ivy Collins as Mrs Barnes

== Reception ==
The Monthly Film Bulletin wrote: "This is a confused and rather dull thriller badly knit together. The acting is amateurish in the extreme, and the continuity is poor."

Kine Weekly wrote: "Its plot, which hinges on the hero's striking resemblance to a crook, is unabashed 'penny dreadful, but the leading players are reasonably convincing and the direction is not lacking in resource."

Picturegoer wrote: "The story is embellished with a music hall sequence, and songs, and has a certain rough robustness which makes for quite acceptable entertainment."
