= Detective Lloyd =

1931 film

- Directed by: Henry MacRae; Ray Taylor
- Written by: Henry MacRae, Ella O'Neill, Basil Dickey, George H. Plympton
- Starring: Jack Lloyd; Muriel Angelus
- Edited by: Charles Saunders
- Distributed by: Universal Pictures; General Films
- Release dates: 4 January, 1932
- Running time: 216 minutes (12 chapters)
- Countries: United Kingdom; United States
- Language: English

Detective Lloyd (1931) is a 12-chapter Universal movie serial. A co-production between the American company Universal and the British company General Films, it was filmed entirely in Britain with British and Commonwealth actors. It was the only sound serial ever produced in the UK. Although a print was shown on British and Swedish TV as recently as the 1970s, the film is now considered lost.

It was also known by the titles Lloyd of the C.I.D. and In the Hands of the Hinfu. Detective Lloyd battled a villain known as the Panther in this serial. Material from the serial was edited into a feature film version called The Green Spot Mystery (1932), which is also a lost film. Detective Lloyd is on the British Film Institute's BFI 75 Most Wanted list of lost films.

== Cast ==
- Jack Lloyd - as Inspector Lloyd
- Muriel Angelus - as Sybil Craig
- Wallace Geoffrey - as The Panther
- Lewis Dayton - as Randall Hale
- Janice Adair - as Diana Brooks
- Tracy Holmes - as Chester Dunn
- Emily Fitzroy - as The Manor Ghost
- Humberston Wright - as the Lodgekeeper
- Gibb McLaughlin - as Abdul
- Earle Stanley - as Salam
- Cecil Musk - as Fouji
- John Turnbull - Barclay of Scotland Yard
- Shayle Gardner - as police inspector
- Vi Kaley - as the charwoman
- Harry Gunn - as yokel
- Frank Dane - as henchman
- Fewlass Llewelyn - as Museum Curator

== Chapter titles ==
1. The Green Spot Murder
2. The Panther Strikes
3. The Trap Springs
4. Tracked by Wireless
5. The Death Ray
6. The Poison Dart
7. The Race with Death
8. The Panther's Lair
9. Imprisoned in the North Tower
10. The Panther's Cunning
11. The Panther at Bay
12. Heroes of the Law

_{Source:}

== See also ==
- List of American films of 1931
- List of film serials by year
- List of film serials by studio

Preceded by The Spell of the Circus (1931)	Universal Serial; Detective Lloyd (1931)	Succeeded by The Airmail Mystery (1932)
