= Walter Tennyson =

British actor (1899–1980)

Walter Tennyson (1899–1980) was a British actor and film director of the silent and early sound era.

== Selected filmography ==
Actor

- The Call of the East (1922)
- The Virgin Queen (1923)
- Women and Diamonds (1924)
- Reveille (1924)
- Speeding Into Trouble (1924)
- Mutiny (1925)
- Sally, Irene and Mary (1925)
- Love's Blindness (1926)
- Corporal Kate (1926)
- The Infamous Lady (1928)
- The Price of Things (1930)

Director

- Father O'Flynn (1935)
- Alibi Inn (1935)
- King of Hearts (1936)
- Annie Laurie (1936)
- Little Miss Somebody (1937)
- The Body Vanished (1939)

Screenwriter

- Trouble (1933)
