= Play Up the Band =

- Frank Atkinson, Betty Ann Davies and Stanley Holloway
- Directed by: Harry Hughes
- Written by: Aveling Ginever; Frank Atkinson; Katherine Strueby; Vernon Harris; Harry Hughes
- Produced by: Basil Humphrys; Eric Donaldson
- Starring: Stanley Holloway; Betty Ann Davies; Leslie Bradley; Amy Veness
- Cinematography: James Wilson
- Edited by: Paul Capon
- Music by: Eric Spear
- Production company: City Films
- Distributed by: Associated British Film Distributors
- Release date: November 1935
- Running time: 71 minutes
- Country: United Kingdom
- Language: English

Play Up the Band (also known as Sharps and Flats) is a 1935 British musical comedy film directed by Harry Hughes and starring Stanley Holloway, Betty Ann Davies and Leslie Bradley. It was written by Aveling Ginever, Frank Atkinson, Katherine Strueby, Vernon Harris and Hughes, and made at Ealing Studios as a quota quickie by the independent company City Films. The film's sets were designed by art director R. Holmes Paul. Location shooting took place at the Crystal Palace.

== Synopsis ==
The brass band of the Northern town of Hechdyke travel south to London to compete in a national contest. In the capital Sam Small becomes mixed up in a series of adventures including a plot to steal Lady Heckdyke's pearls and the romantic relationship between Heckdyke's son and Small's cousin Betty. Mistakenly arrested for the theft of the pearls, Small has to race to reach The Crystal Palace in time for the competition.

== Cast ==
- Stanley Holloway as Sam Small
- Betty Ann Davies as Betty Small
- Leslie Bradley as Jack
- Frank Atkinson as Alf Ramsbottom
- Charles Sewell as Lord Hechdyke
- Amy Veness as Lady Heckdyke
- Cynthia Stock as Vera
- Julie Suedo as Marquise de Vaux
- Arthur Gomez as Marquis de Vaux
- Hal Gordon as bandmaster
- Louise Selkirk and her Ladies Orchestra as themselves
- The London Brass Band as themselves

== Reception ==
The Monthly Film Bulletin wrote: "Stanley Holloway as chief bandsman the soloist acts well and is very entertaining. His Yorkshire accent gets its laughs, and his recitations of the Ghost in Hampton Court Maze and Sweeney Todd the Barber are thrillingly funny. He is well backed up by the rest of the cast. Love interest is supplied by Betty Davies and the son of the factory owner."

Kine Weekly wrote: "Artless north country comedy, dealing with the hectic adventures of the members of a brass band, while on a visit to London. Original gags are difficult to find during the course of the picture's haphazard development, but Stanley Holloway, nevertheless, manages to survive the severe handicap imposed by inferior subject matter and direction."
