= Forbidden (1949 film) =

1949 film by George King

- Theatrical release poster
- Directed by: George King
- Written by: Katherine Strueby
- Produced by: George King
- Starring: Douglass Montgomery; Patricia Burke; Hazel Court
- Cinematography: Hone Glendinning
- Edited by: Douglas Myers
- Music by: George Melachrino
- Distributed by: British Lion Films
- Release date: 28 February 1949
- Running time: 87 minutes
- Country: United Kingdom
- Language: English
- Budget: £100,000
- Box office: £110,903 (UK)

Forbidden (also known as A Lady Was to Die; U.S. title: Scarlet Heaven) is a 1949 British thriller film directed and produced by George King and starring Douglass Montgomery, Hazel Court and Patricia Burke. It was written by Katherine Strueby.

It was King's last production both as independent producer and as director, and features the final screen appearance by Montgomery.

== Plot ==
In Blackpool, chemist Jim Harding has been reduced to making a living peddling potions and medicines from a fairground stall with a former army colleague Dan Collins.

Trapped in a loveless marriage with Diana, a vulgar, shrewish and domineering woman who harbours ambitions of breaking into showbusiness, Jim finds himself attracted to the kinder working-class Jane Thompson, who sells candyfloss and ice cream at an adjacent stall. Jim does not reveal to Jane that he is married as the two fall in love and begin an affair. Diana meanwhile is engaged in a liaison of her own with the older Jerry Burns who, she believes, will be able to help with her theatrical aspirations.

Diana finds out about Jim's affair and visits Jane at home. Diana reveals Jim's married status, tries to convince Jane that Jim is a serial philanderer and that she is only the latest in a succession of young women he has targeted, and offers her cash to end the relationship. Jane refuses to be bought off but confronts Jim, who protests that he is caught in an intolerably unhappy marital situation with a selfish, unscrupulous woman. Jim confronts Diana and demands a divorce, which she refuses, as it might hamper her career.

In desperation, Jim decides that the only solution is to kill Diana. Aware of her thyroid illness and addiction to multiple medications to control her weight, he uses his knowledge to concoct pills containing a lethal dose which he slips amongst her habitual supply. Then, having second thoughts, he hurries home but finds Diana dead. In a panic, he buries her body beneath the floorboards in his workshop, only to discover later when clearing up in the bedroom that the deadly pills he made up are untouched – Diana, in fact, died of natural causes and his disposal of her body has been unnecessary and incriminating.

Diana's disappearance in unexplained circumstances arouses the suspicions of the police, who come to the conclusion that all the indications are that she has been murdered by her husband. Jim attempts to flee but is tracked down and chased through the streets of the town, where the final confrontation takes place at Blackpool Tower.

== Cast ==
- Douglass Montgomery as Jim Harding
- Hazel Court as Jane Thompson
- Patricia Burke as Diana Harding
- Garry Marsh as Jerry Burns
- Ronald Shiner as Dan Collins
- Kenneth Griffith as Johnny
- Eliot Makeham as Pop Thompson
- Frederick Leister as Dr. Franklin
- Richard Bird as Jennings
- Michael Medwin as cabby
- Andrew Cruickshank as Inspector Baxter
- Peggy Ann Clifford as Millie
- Peter Jones as Pete
- Erik Chitty as Schofield
- Sam Kydd as Joe

== Reception ==
=== Box office ===
As of 30 June 1949 the film had earned £64,400 in the UK of which £50,680 went to the producer.

=== Critical ===
The Monthly Film Bulletin wrote: "Douglass Montgomery is at his best as the overwrought Jim, and Patricia Burke is convincing as his selfish, ambitious wife. Hazel Court looks and acts the cockney Jeannie well, but her accent lapses too often. Comedy relief is capably supplied by Ronald Shiner as Dan, Jim's friend and partner, and excellent acting by a generally competent cast makes up for some weak spots in production. This tense, exciting drama manages to maintain an element of suspense throughout, despite the fact that almost every turn in the plot can be foreseen."

Kine Weekly wrote: "Unvarnished, but at the same time colourful, sex melodrama, set in fabulous Blackpool. ... The characters are well drawn and the authentic and bizarre locale is exploited with showmanship, while much popular sentiment and comedy cunningly flavour its unseemly hanky-panky. Whatever its morals, it's anything but dull. Very good British programmer for other than family audiences."

Picture Show wrote: "Here's a melodrama that is sexy, exciting and at times amusing, set against the noisy, colourful holiday background of Blackpool. ... If your idea of a hero is an unbalanced murderer even though there's a technical hitch in his performance, so to speak – you should enjoy the film, which is very well made."
