= Katherine Strueby =

American screenwriter (1908–1988)

- Born: 28 May 1908; Newton, Kansas, United States
- Died: 14 November 1988 (aged 80); London, United Kingdom
- Other name: Katherine Hazel Strueby
- Occupation: Writer
- Years active: 1935–1954 (film)

Katherine Hazel Strueby (28 May 1908 – 14 November 1988) was an American-born British screenwriter. She was married to the writer Gordon Wellesley.

== Selected filmography ==
- Play Up the Band (1935)
- Death Drives Through (1935)
- It Happened in Paris (1935)
- Cafe Colette (1937)
- Special Edition (1938)
- The High Command (1938)
- Room for Two (1940)
- Candlelight in Algeria (1944)
- Flight from Folly (1945)
- Gaiety George (1946)
- Code of Scotland Yard (1947)
- Forbidden (1949)

== Bibliography ==
- Brian McFarlane. Lance Comfort. Manchester University Press, 1999.
