= Gonzell White =

American performer (1897–?)

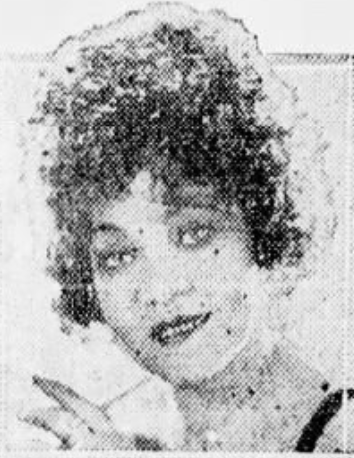
- White, from a 1927 pomade advertisement
- Born: May 19, 1897; Chicago, Illinois, United States
- Other names: Gonzelle White
- Occupation: Vaudeville performer

Gonzell White (May 19, 1897 – date of death unknown), also written Gonzelle White, was an American jazz, blues, and vaudeville performer in the United States.

== Biography ==
White was born in Chicago, Illinois, United States, in 1897. She performed as a blues, jazz, vaudeville, and burlesque act, and was first mentioned in reports in 1912, and specifically as a blues singer in 1914. She sang in various groups including as a duo with Edward Lankford, who was also her manager. They married in Kansas in 1920.

She toured on various circuits and with various acts, including with Lester Moore as White and Moore. The entertainer Pigmeat Markham was a member of her troupe in the mid-1920s, and Gus Aiken also toured with her. She performed at Proctor's Theatre in Schenectady, New York. A review of her group, Gonzell White Jazzers, in the October 20 Kalamazoo Gazette, and other Michigan papers, gave favorable reviews of her headlining show that toured Michigan.

The Chicago Defender ran notices and reviews about White and her group including photographs. She was part of the Booker T. Washington Stock Company. Billboard also reviewed Gonzelle and her group several times. White toured on various circuits including in Michigan and in Cuba. In Cuba she headlined as a singer and saxophone player. Her group included Billy Young, Alfreda Thomas, Mary Jackson as a soubrette, Earl Frazier on piano, Amanzie Richardson as a comedian and dancer, Freddy Crump on drums, Jake Frazier on trombone, Gus Aiken as a soloist on coronet, Harry Smith on coronet and as a dancer, and Ed Lankford on saxophone and as manager. Her group included several influential acts. She featured in advertisements for Exelento Quinine Pomade (a pomade).

Count Basie toured with her group in the mid-1920s. Basie described her as "more of an entertainer than a musician... She was a real pro with a lot of class... She was very light-skinned... the kind of small, nice-looking woman that you think of as being very cute. And, of course, she always wore fine, stylish clothes and costumes, and she also sported a diamond in one of her front teeth."

Lankford died while the group was on tour in 1926. White's later life is publicly unreported.
