= Archie Pitt =

British actor (1882–1940)

- Born: Archibald Abraham Selinger; 21 February 1882; Camberwell, London, England
- Died: 12 November 1940 (aged 58); London, England
- Spouse(s): Bertha Deitchman (stage name May Denver) (m. 1912; div. 1922) Gracie Fields (m. 1923; div. 1940) Anne Lipman (m. 1940–1940)
- Children: 1

Archie Pitt (born Archibald Abraham Sellinger; 21 February 1882 – 12 November 1940) was a British music hall performer, showman and talent agent. He is best known for his marriage to Gracie Fields, whose career he managed. Archie Pitt's Band – a junior pit orchestra and revue band that toured the country – provided a professional start to several notable musicians, including Max Abrams and Nat Gonella. Pitt was born in Camberwell, south London, in 1882, and died in 1940 in Hendon, Middlesex.

== Theatrical revues ==
- Yes, I Think So (1915), Manchester
- Mr Tower of London (1925)
- False Alarms (1926), Brighton
- The Show's The Thing (1929), Victoria Theatre, London
- Walk This Way (1932), Winter Garden Theatre, London

== Selected filmography ==
=== Actor ===
- Danny Boy (1934)
- Barnacle Bill (1935)
- Excuse My Glove (1936)

=== Screenwriter ===
- Sally in Our Alley (1931)
- Looking on the Bright Side (1932)
- Boys Will Be Boys (1932 film)

== Bibliography ==
- Babington, Bruce. British Stars and Stardom: From Alma Taylor to Sean Connery. Manchester University Press, 2001.
