= My Wife's Family (play) =

1930 play by Fred Duprez

- Original language: English
- Written by: Fred Duprez
- Genre: Comedy

Premiere
- Date: 17 February 1930
- Place: Princes Theatre, Bradford

My Wife's Family is a comedy play by the British-based American writer Fred Duprez based on an earlier story by Harry B. Linton and Hal Stephens. It premiered at the Princes Theatre, Bradford before transferring to the Garrick Theatre in London's West End where it ran for 118 performances between 3 March and 13 June 1931. The original West End cast included Ernie Lotinga, Arnold Bell, Hugh E. Wright and Joan Ingram. It was revived on a number of occasions and made into several films. A farce, the play's comedy revolves around a newly-married wife who overhears her husband talking about a Baby grand piano and mistakenly believes he has an illegitimate child.

== Adaptations ==
In 1931 it was made into the British film The Wife's Family which was followed by two further British adaptations My Wife's Family (1941) and My Wife's Family (1956). It was also adapted into Scandinavian films, the Swedish Mother-in-Law's Coming (1932) and Voi meitä! Anoppi tulee shot in Finland in 1933.

== Bibliography ==
- Goble, Alan. The Complete Index to Literary Sources in Film. Walter de Gruyter, 1999.
- Wearing, J.P. The London Stage 1930-1939: A Calendar of Productions, Performers, and Personnel. Rowman & Littlefield, 2014.
