= Barnacle Bill (1935 film) =

1935 British film by Harry Hughes

- Directed by: Harry Hughes
- Written by: Aveling Ginever; Archie Pitt
- Produced by: Basil Humphrys
- Starring: Archie Pitt; Joan Gardner; Gus McNaughton; Jean Adrienne
- Music by: Eric Spear
- Production company: Basil Humphrys Productions
- Distributed by: Butcher's Film Service
- Release date: January 1935
- Running time: 90 minutes
- Country: United Kingdom
- Language: English

Barnacle Bill is a 1935 British drama film directed by Harry Hughes and starring Archie Pitt, Joan Gardner and Gus McNaughton. A conflicted sailor tries to balance his family life with his time at sea.

== Cast ==
- Archie Pitt as Bill Harris
- Joan Gardner as Jill Harris
- Gus McNaughton as Jack Baron
- Jean Adrienne as Mary Bailey
- Sybil Jason as Jill as a child
- Denis O'Neil as Shorty
- O. B. Clarence as Uncle George
- Henrietta Watson as Aunt Julia
- Minnie Rayner as Mrs Bailey
- Iris Darbyshire as Florrie
- Tully Comber as Harry Fordyce
