= George Melachrino =

British musician (1909–1965)

George Melachrino (born George Miltiades Melachrino; 1 May 1909 – 18 June 1965) was a musician, composer of film music, and musical director who was English born of Greek and Italian descent. He was an accomplished player of the violin, viola, oboe, clarinet and saxophone.

== Biography ==
George Melachrino was born in London, England. As a young boy, he had a love of music. At the age of five, he began composing and by the age of fourteen he enrolled in the Trinity College of Music. In 1927, he began his career by singing and playing at the Savoy Hill Studios in London. For the next twelve years, he played in many different bands and orchestras. In the 1930s, Melachrino started working for bands led by Ambrose singing and playing saxophone with Carroll Gibbons at the Savoy Hotel London, and Bert Firman, and started playing on radio for the BBC. In 1935, he was living at Ascot Court, Grove End Road, in St John's Wood.

By 1939, he had started his own band and secured a contract at the Café de Paris. He joined the Army a year later, and received training at the Corps of Military Police where he became a P.T. Instructor. Melachrino also gained experience as a military musician at the Army Broadcasting Department, as Musical Director for the recording of entertainment for overseas forces, leading the British Band of the Allied Expeditionary Forces and the Orchestra Khaki.

After the war, in 1945, he formed the George Melachrino Orchestra, an orchestra that became synonymous with lush string arrangements. From 1945 to 1947, he conducted for Richard Tauber in most of his Parlophone recordings and BBC broadcasts. Beginning in the 1950s he specialized in easy listening arrangements of popular music standards. His ensemble recorded under the names, 'Melachrino Strings' and the 'Melachrino Strings and Orchestra.'

In 1956, his orchestra's track "Autumn Concerto" reached number 18 in the UK Singles Chart, and remained in the chart for nine weeks. His album, Immortal Ladies, recorded in late 1954 had sold over one million copies by 1956, and he was presented with a gold disc by RCA Records chief, George Marek, so becoming the first British orchestra leader to receive such an award.

Melachrino frequently performed on BBC and American Armed Forces Radio.

The "Starlight Roof Waltz", as performed by the George Melachrino Strings, was the signature tune of the radio programme Moeders wil is wet (1949–1974), the Dutch equivalent of Housewives' Choice.

His lead arranger during the British Band of the AEF and later with the Melachrino Strings was Bert Thompson, who also arranged "Little White Bull" and "The Young Ones".

Melachrino has a star on the Hollywood Walk of Fame. On June 18, 1965, Melachrino was found dead in the bathtub of his home in Kensington.

== Selected filmography ==
- Woman to Woman (1947)
- The Shop at Sly Corner (1947)
- No Orchids for Miss Blandish (1948)
- The Story of Shirley Yorke (1948)
- Dark Secret (1949)
- The Man from Yesterday (1949)
- Eight O'Clock Walk (1954)
- The Gamma People (1956)

== Discography ==
Title	Label and catalogue number	Year
Music for Dining (10")	RCA Victor DLP-1000	1952
Music for Relaxation (10")	RCA Victor DLP-1001	1952
Music for Reading (10")	RCA Victor DLP-1002	1952
A Melachrino Concert (10")	RCA Victor LPM-1003	1952
A Melachrino Concert (EP)	RCA Victor EPB-1003	1952
Melachrino Magic Strings (10")	His Master's Voice DLP-1014	1953
Soft Lights and Sweet Music (10")	His Master's Voice DLP-1046	1953
My Lady Fair (10")	His Master's Voice DLP-1090	1953
Midnight on Park Avenue (10")	His Master's Voice DLP-1101	1953
Music for Dining	RCA Victor LPM-1000	1953
Music for Relaxation	RCA Victor LPM-1001	1953
Music for Reading	RCA Victor LPM-1002	1953
Music for Faith and Inner Calm	RCA Victor LPM-1004	1954
Serenade in the Night	His Master's Voice DLP-1127	1954
The Music Of The Melachrino Strings (EP)	RCA Victor – EPA 491	1954
Music for Courage and Confidence	RCA Victor LPM-1005	1954
The Melachrino Strings (EP)	His Master's Voice – 7EG 8002	1954
Music for Courage and Confidence (EP)	RCA Victor EPB-1005	1954
Music to Help You Sleep	RCA Victor LPM-1006	1954
Plays Medleys Show Tunes	RCA Victor LPM-1008	1954
Music for Two People Alone	RCA Victor LPM-1027	1954
Music for Daydreaming	RCA Victor LPM-1028	1954
Music to Work or Study By	RCA Victor LPM-1029	1954
Christmas in High Fidelity	RCA Victor LPM-1045	1954
Music for the Nostalgic Traveler	RCA Victor LPM-1053	1955
Autumn Leaves (EP)	RCA Victor – SPD 4	1955
Immortal Ladies	RCA Victor LPM-1110	1955
Melodie in Penombra	La Voce Del Padrone – QDLP 6023	1955
George Melachrino at San Remo 1956 (10")	Odeon URL7300EP	1956
Masquerade	RCA Victor LPM-1184	1956
Stardust (EP)	RCA Victor – EPA-597	1956
Masquerade (2 x EP)	RCA Victor – EPB-1184-3	1956
Sounds of Paris	RCA Victor LPM-1261	1956
Melachrino on Broadway	RCA Victor LPM-1307	1956
I'll Walk Beside You	RCA Victor LPM-1329	1957
Magic in Music (EP)	His Master's Voice – 7EGM 8218	1957
Those Beautiful Strings	RCA Victor LPM-1330	1957
Moonlight Concerto	His Master's Voice DLP-1197	1958
Fascination (EP)	His Master's Voice – 7-EGS 77	1958
Under Western Skies	RCA Victor LSP-1676	1958
Strauss Waltzes	RCA Victor LSP-1757	1958
Lisbon at Twilight	RCA Victor LSP-1762	1958
Rendezvous in Rome	RCA Victor LSP-1955	1959
Christmas Joy	RCA Victor LSP-2044	1959
Music of Romberg	RCA Victor LSP-2106	1960
Music of Victor Herbert	RCA Victor LSP-2129	1960
Music from Frank Loesser's Greenwillow	RCA Victor LSP-2229	1960
The Magic Of Melachrino Strings (EP)	His Master's Voice – 7EG 8470	1961
More Music for Relaxation	RCA Victor LSP-2278	1961
Music from Bells Are Ringing	RCA Victor LSP-2279	1961
The Music of Jerome Kern	RCA Victor LSP-2283	1961
More Music for Dining	RCA Victor LSP-2412	1961
Music of Rodgers	RCA Victor LSP-2513	1962
Waltzes of Berlin	RCA Victor LSP-2561	1962
Our Man in London	RCA Victor LSP-2608	1963
All the Hits from Oliver	RCA Victor LSP-2660	1963
April in Paris	RCA Victor LSP-2739	1963
Ballads of Berlin	RCA Victor LSP-2817	1964
You and the Night and the Music	RCA Victor LSP-2866	1964
Music for Romance	RCA Victor LSP-2979	1965
New Sound of Broadway	RCA Victor LSP-3323	1966
Something to Remember You By	RCA Victor LSP-3398	1966
Music to Write Letters By Vol 1 (2 sides)	RCA Victor PRM-247	1967
Love Walked In	Pickwick SPC-3234	1971
Play the Tom Jones Hits	Pickwick SPC-3242	1971
Love Story	Pickwick SPC-3263	1972
Velvet Voices - Velvet Strings	Columbia Musical Treasury P6S5532 - 6LPSet	1975
L'Orchestra D'Archi Di George Melachrino	RCA – NL 45307	1982
Great Film and Show Tunes (1950-1952)	Living Era CDAJA 5469	2003
