= Lesley Osmond =

British actress (1921–1987)

- Born: 23 November 1921; London, England
- Died: March 1987 (aged 65); London, England
- Occupation: Actress
- Years active: 1942–1953 (film)

Lesley Osmond (23 November 1921 – March 1987) was a British actress. She appeared in the West End in the 1944 play The Rest is Silence and the 1953 musical The Glorious Days.

== Selected filmography ==
- Asking for Trouble (1942)
- In Which We Serve (1942)
- We'll Meet Again (1943)
- I'll Turn to You (1946)
- The Mysterious Mr. Nicholson (1947)
- House of Darkness (1948)
- This Was a Woman (1948)
- The Story of Shirley Yorke (1948)
- Let's Have a Murder (1950)
- Chelsea Story (1951)
- Death Is a Number (1951)
