= My Wife's Family (1956 film) =

British comedy by Gilbert Gunn

- Original British quad poster
- Directed by: Gilbert Gunn
- Written by: Gilbert Gunn; Talbot Rothwell
- Based on: My Wife's Family by Fred Duprez
- Produced by: Hamilton G. Inglis
- Starring: Ronald Shiner; Ted Ray; Greta Gynt; Robertson Hare
- Cinematography: Gilbert Taylor
- Edited by: Edward B. Jarvis
- Music by: Ray Martin
- Production company: Forth Films
- Distributed by: Associated British-Pathé (UK)
- Release date: November 1956 (UK)
- Running time: 76 minutes
- Country: United Kingdom
- Language: English

My Wife's Family is a 1956 British comedy film directed by Gilbert Gunn and starring Ronald Shiner, Ted Ray, Greta Gynt, Diane Hart and Robertson Hare. It was written by Gunn and Talbot Rothwell.

== Plot ==
Jack Gay, a newlywed with a dominating mother-in-law attempts to surprise his wife Stella with a baby grand piano, but when she overhears him discussing it, she mistakes it for an illegitimate child, particularly with the arrival of his ex-girlfriend, the blonde and glamorous Gloria Marsh.

== Cast ==
- Ronald Shiner as Doc Knott
- Ted Ray as Jack Gay
- Diane Hart as Stella Gay
- Fabia Drake as Arabella
- Greta Gynt as Gloria Marsh
- Robertson Hare as Noah
- Zena Marshall as Hilda
- Jessica Cairns as Irma
- Benny Lee as Arnold
- Jimmy Mageean as Dobson
- Gilbert Harding as himself

== Production ==
It was a remake of the 1941 British film My Wife's Family, and is the third British film of the stage farce of the same name by actor Fred Duprez.

== Critical reception ==
The Monthly Film Bulletin wrote: "A further adaptation of the slapstick comedy by Fred Duprez (previously filmed in 1931 and 1941), this new production, in colour, serves as a vehicle for two comedians with agreeably contrasting personalities. Ronald Shiner as Doc Knott gives a robust display of over-confidence, while Ted Ray successfully suggests the harassed Jack. But their determined efforts are largely defeated by the lack of originality in both dialogue and situations. Of the supporting players, Fabia Drake makes an imposing Arabella and Robertson Hare gives his customary caricature of the hen-pecked husband."

TV Guide wrote, "The third screen version of Fred Duprez's play proves once and for all there's no hope of reviving the dead... Overplayed without shame, but that doesn't help the ancient jokes any."

Sky Movies noted a "broad comedy, with Ronald Shiner and Ted Ray extracting the maximum number of laughs out of the mother-in-law-coming-to-stay situation. Fabia Drake gives a sharply-observed portrait of the old battleaxe."
