= Fred Duprez =

American actor (1884–1938)

- Caricature by George Cooke, 1916: Copyright, V & A Museum
- Born: Frederick August Duprez; September 6, 1884; Detroit, Michigan, US
- Died: October 27, 1938 (aged 54); Shipboard, en route to UK
- Occupations: Actor, comedian and writer
- Spouse(s): Grace Hazard (m. 1912; div. 191?) Florence Isabel Matthews (m. 1916)

Frederick August Duprez (September 6, 1884 – October 27, 1938) was an American actor, comedian and singer who performed in vaudeville, phonograph record and film. He made phonograph recordings in the US and the UK in the 1900s, 1910s, and 1920s. Most of the films he appeared in were British. He was also a writer, and wrote the popular stage farce My Wife's Family, filmed three times: first in Britain, in 1931; next in Sweden in 1932; and finally in Finland, in 1933.

Duprez performs a baseball skit with Bob Roberts in 1909

Fred Duprez was born in Detroit, Michigan. He died from a heart attack on board a ship en route to England. He was the father of the actress, June Duprez.

== Partial filmography ==
- Heads We Go (1933) - George Anderson
- Meet My Sister (1933) - Hiram Sowerby
- My Old Duchess (1934) - Jesse Martin
- Without You (1934) - Baron Gustav von Steinmeyer
- Love, Life and Laughter (1934) - Sam Greenbaum
- Danny Boy (1934) - Leo Newman
- Dance Band (1935) - Lewes
- No Monkey Business (1935) - Theater Manager
- Dark World (1935) - Schwartz
- Ball at Savoy (1936) - Not Herbert
- A Wife or Two (1936) - Sam Hickleberry
- Queen of Hearts (1936) - Zulenberg
- Gypsy Melody (1936) - Herbert P. Melon
- Hearts of Humanity (1936) - Manager
- You Must Get Married (1936) - Cyrus P. Hankin
- The Big Noise (1936) - Henry Hadley
- Reasonable Doubt (1936)
- Head over Heels (1937) - Norma's Manager
- Cafe Colette (1937) - Burnes
- Knights for a Day (1937) - Custer
- O-Kay for Sound (1937) - Hyman Goldberger
- The Pearls of the Crown (1937) - American (uncredited)
- All That Glitters (1937) - Mortimer
- Kathleen Mavourneen (1938) - Walter Bryant
- Hey! Hey! USA (1938) - Cyrus Schultz
- Take Off That Hat (1938) - Burroughs
- The Mysterious Mr. Davis (1939) - Wilcox (final film role)
