= Mother-in-Law's Coming =

1932 film

- Directed by: Paul Merzbach
- Written by: Ivar Johansson
- Based on: My Wife's Family by Fred Duprez
- Produced by: Stellan Claësson
- Starring: Karin Swanström; Nils Wahlbom; Magda Holm
- Cinematography: Julius Jaenzon
- Edited by: Paul Merzbach
- Music by: Jules Sylvain; Karl Wehle
- Production company: Film AB Minerva
- Distributed by: Svensk Filmindustri
- Release date: 18 April 1932
- Running time: 84 minutes
- Country: Sweden
- Language: Swedish

Mother-in-Law's Coming (Swedish: Svärmor kommer) is a 1932 Swedish comedy film directed by Paul Merzbach and starring Karin Swanström, Nils Wahlbom and Magda Holm. It was shot at the Råsunda Studios in Stockholm. The film's sets were designed by the art director Arne Åkermark. It is based on the West End stage farce My Wife's Family by Fred Duprez.

== Cast ==
- Karin Swanström as Mother-in-law
- Nils Wahlbom as Abel
- Magda Holm as Ulla Berggren
- Adolf Jahr as John Berggren
- Annalisa Ericson as Maggie
- Sture Lagerwall as Olle
- Erik Berglund as Adelfors
- Maritta Marke as Dolly Deje
- Birgitta Hede as Sally, maid

== Bibliography ==
- Larsson, Mariah & Marklund, Anders. Swedish Film: An Introduction and Reader. Nordic Academic Press, 2010.
