= The Ware Case =

The Ware Case may refer to:

- The Ware Case (play) by George Pleydell Bancroft
- The Ware Case (1917 film), a 1917 film adaptation
- The Ware Case (1928 film), a 1928 film adaptation
- The Ware Case (1938 film), a 1938 film adaptation
