= Warbrook House Hotel, Eversley =

Country house in Eversley, Hampshire, England

Coordinates: 51.3499°N 0.8902°W

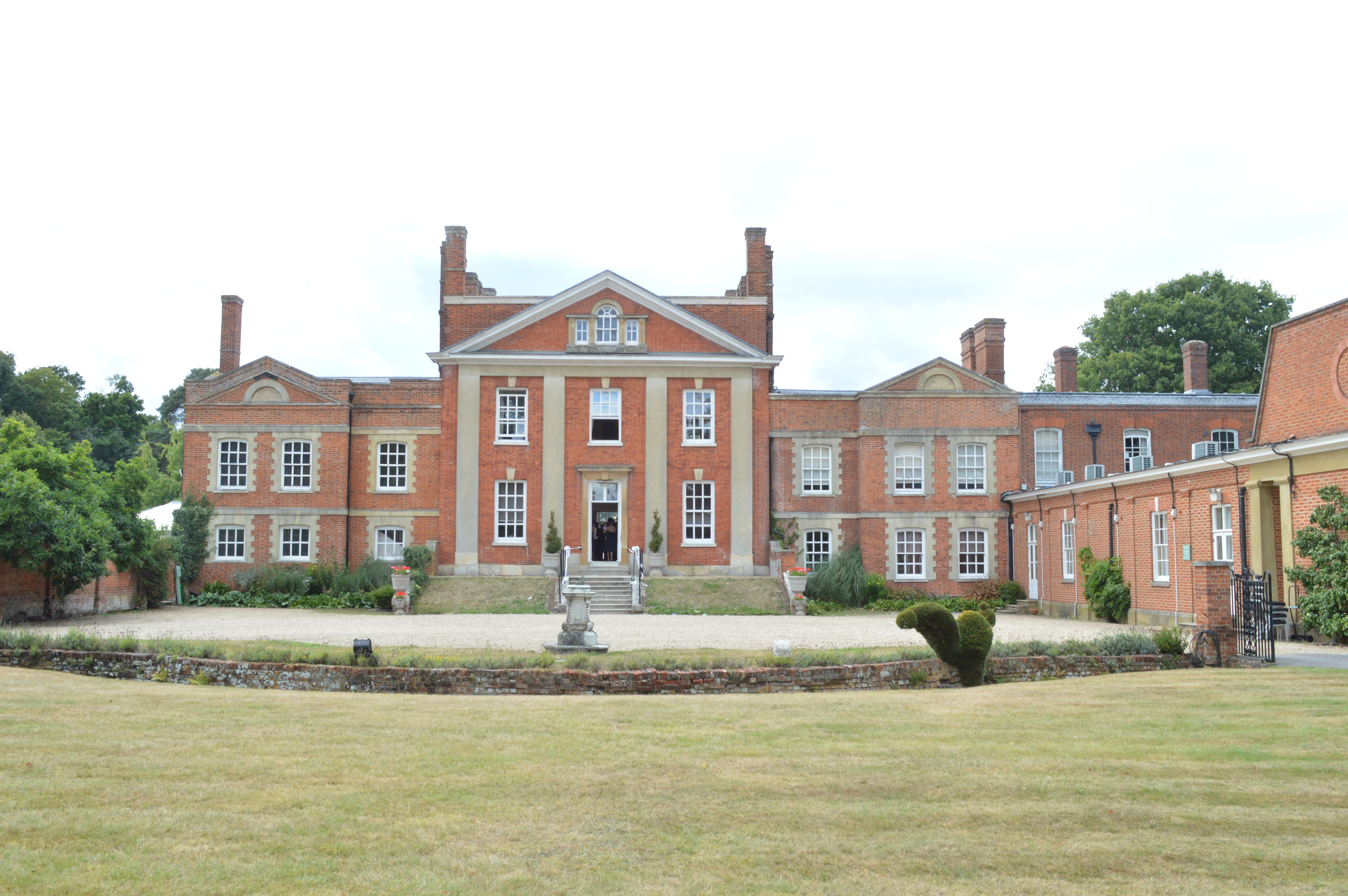
Warbrook House Hotel

Warbrook House is a building of historical significance and is listed as Grade I in the English Heritage Register. It was built in 1724 by the architect John James for his own use. It was subsequently the home of a number of notable people and is now a hotel.

== Early residents ==
John James (1672–1746) was the son of Rev John James, Master of the Holy Ghost School at Basingstoke, later vicar there and Rector of Stratfield Turgis. In 1697 he married Hannah Bancks, who was the niece of Matthew Bancks, Master Carpenter to the Crown. John James held a number of public offices, eventually succeeding Sir Christopher Wren as Surveyor to St Paul's Cathedral.

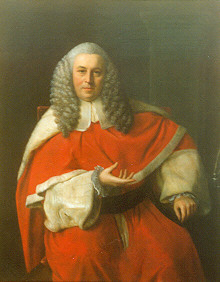
Judge George Nares

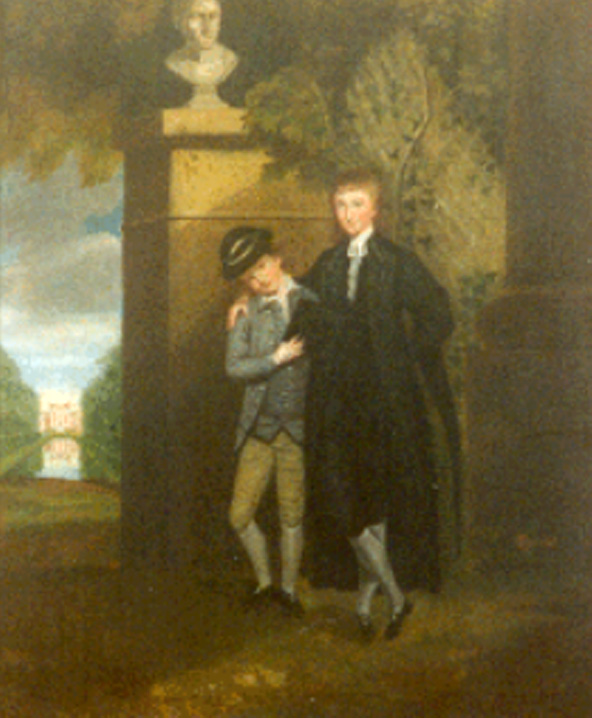
George and Edward Nares in front of Warbrook House in about 1770

Warbrook House was the subject of several articles in architectural journals. In 1925 Eberlein said that one reason the house claims interest and attention is because "its own intrinsic beauty commends it to our favourable regard and its fidelity to one particular phase of the English domestic style of the period renders it worthy of close study."

The sundial at the entrance to the house was made by William Collier who was a craftsman in London who operated from 1712 until 1730. It was part of the original garden designed by James and according to an article written in 1923 John James initials appear on it interlaced.

John died in 1746 and was buried in Eversley Church. There is a memorial plaque in the Church which is dedicated to him, his wife Hannah and his son which gives a brief history of his life. After his death the house was sold. John Comyn lived there for some time and then in about 1762 It was bought by Sir George Nares (1716–1786) who owned Warbrook House from about 1762 until his death in 1786. He was born in 1716 in Hanwell in Middlesex. His father was George Nares of Albury, Oxfordshire. He became a barrister and in 1771 was appointed as a judge and awarded a knighthood.

In 1751 he married Mary, third daughter of Sir John Strange. The couple had ten children some of whom died in infancy. In about 1770 a painting was made of two of his sons George and Edward outside Warbrook House.

Sir George died in 1786 and left the house to his eldest son John. However he was forced to sell it in 1790. It became the residence of John Comyn for several years and then in 1795 it was advertised for sale. It was purchased by Jonathan George Micklethwait (1764–1838) who lived there for the next 33 years until his death in 1838. It was then bought by Augustus Stapleton.

== Later residents ==
Augustus Granville Stapleton (1800–1880) owned Warbrook House from 1838 until his death in 1880. It was then owned by the Stapleton family who leased it to Lady Glass for forty years.

Augustus Granville Stapleton was born on 28 November 1800 in St James's, Westminster. He was the youngest of the three illegitimate sons of John Parker, 1st Earl of Morley and Lady Elizabeth Araminta Monck (1764–1845). He went to the University of Cambridge and in 1823 gained his Bachelor of Arts degree. On leaving University he became the Private Secretary to George Canning who became prime minister. After Canning’s death he wrote several books on the life of his employer.

In 1825 he married Catherine Bulteel, daughter of John Bulteel of Fleet, Devon. The 1851 Census shows the family living at Warbrook House with Catherine's sister Elizabeth Bulteel (1792–1875) and seven servants. Catherine died in 1856 and Augustus continued to live at the House until about 1876 and then moved to Drymoor where he died in 1880. From about 1878 until 1915 the Stapleton family leased Warbrook House to Lady Glass.

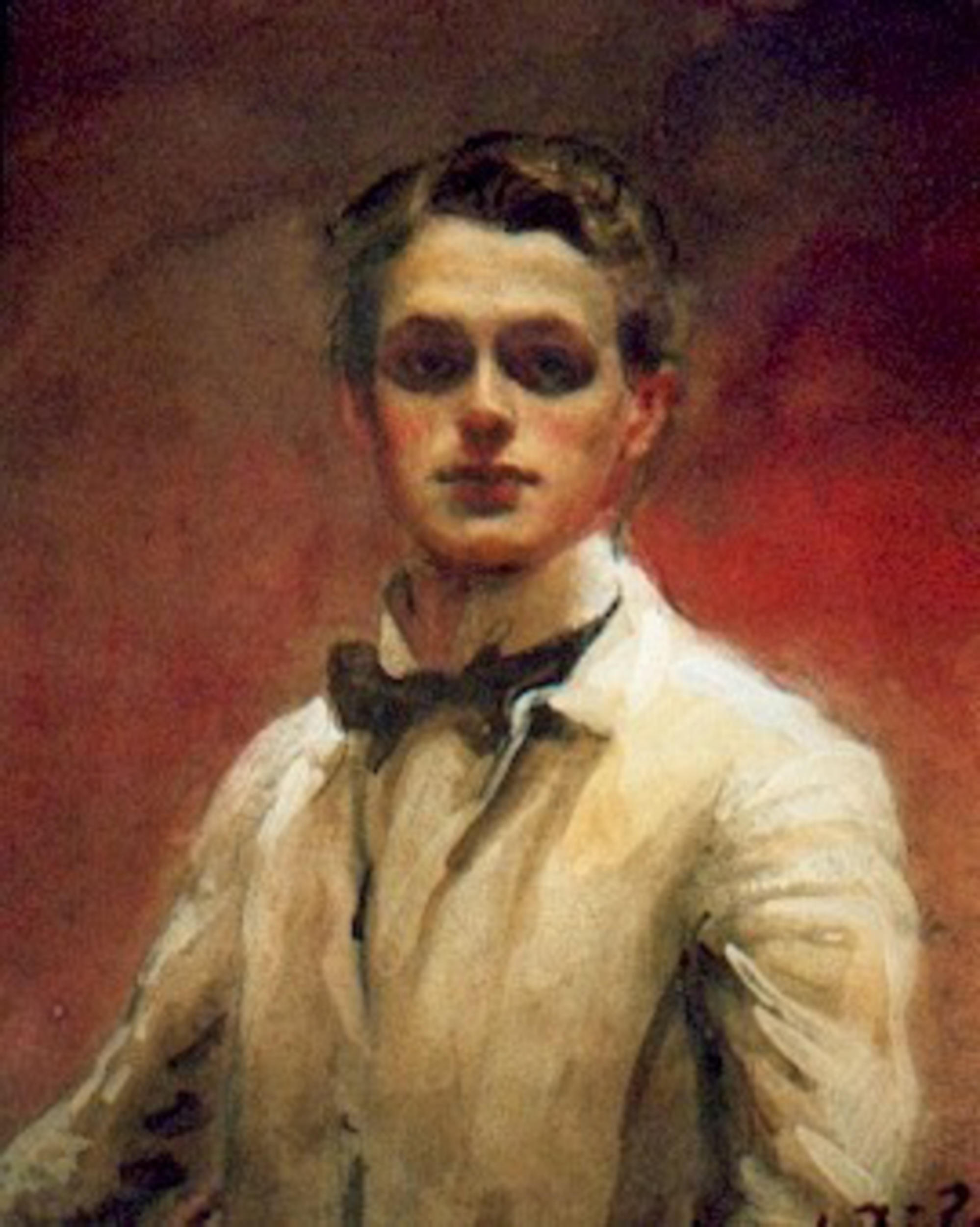
William Bruce Ellis Ranken self portrait

Lady Glass (1832–1915) was born Anne Tanner and was the daughter of Thomas Tanner of Avesbury, Hampshire. In 1854 she married Sir Richard Atwood Glass (1820–1873) who was the manufacturer of the Atlantic submarine cable and for this work he received a knighthood. The couple had no children and lived in Moorlands Villa in Southampton. Sir Richard died in 1873 when Anne was only 41 and she left Moorlands Villa a few years later to live in Warbrook House. The 1881 Census shows her there with several visitors and eight servants. She occasionally held charity events at Warbrook. A 1906 newspaper describes a fete that she held in the grounds that was attended by over 500 people. She died in 1915 and in about 1920 the house was bought– by William Bruce Ellis Ranken who lived there until 1935.

William Bruce Ellis Ranken (1881–1941) was a well-known artist, and brother-in-law to Ernest Thesiger. He was born in 1881 in Edinburgh. His father Robert Burt Ranken was a wealthy lawyer. He was educated at Eton from April 1895 to July 1899 where he studied watercolour painting. He then attended The Slade School of Art in London from 1899 to 1903.

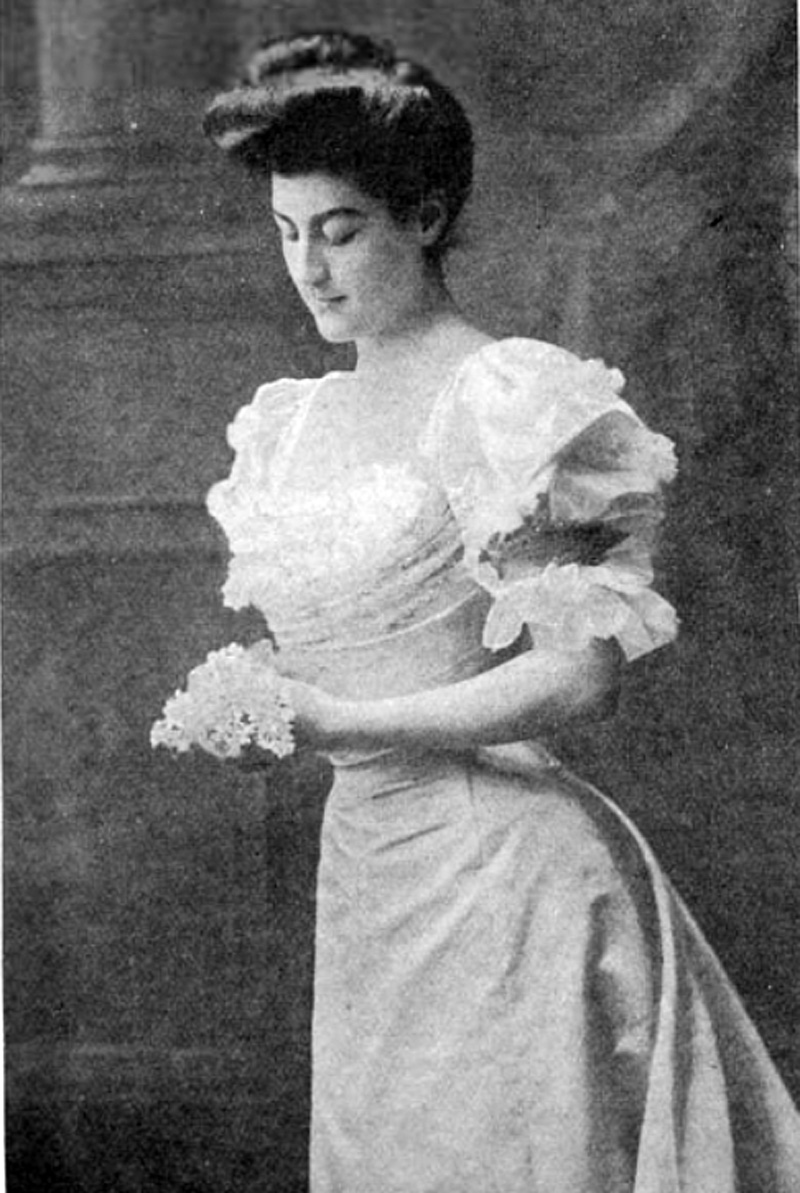
Isabelle Rosalind Humphreys-Owen in 1907 shortly before her marriage

After he bought Warbrook Ranken undertook a considerable amount of repair work on the building. He created paintings of several rooms in the house which were included in the book by Basil Ionides called “Colour and Interior Decoration”. He sold the house in about 1935 and it was bought by Mrs Humphreys-Owen.

Isabelle Rosalind Humphreys-Owen (1884–1965) was born Isabelle Rosalind Sassoon and was the daughter of Sir Edward Elias Sassoon. Her great grandfather was David Sassoon who founded the Sassoon dynasty. The Sassoon family were very rich merchants who traded in India and China and were known as the “Rothschild of the East”.

In 1907 she married Arthur Erskine Humphreys-Owen who was a successful lawyer. The couple had two children, a son and a daughter. Arthur went to War in 1914 and served in France. He was wounded and suffered shell shock, after which he was invalided home. In 1919 he left their house in Chelsea and was never seen again. Some years later she became romantically involved with the famous physician Norman Bethune but she was not free to marry him, even though four years had passed since her husband’s disappearance and she had made various efforts in vain to find him.

Mrs Owen-Humphreys lived at Warbrook House from about 1935 until her death in 1965. During that time she was involved in a great deal of community work. During World War II she offered the house to the New Zealand authorities as a convalescent home for recovering soldiers. She provided it rent-free and paid for some of the staff.

In 1965 after the death of Mrs Humphreys-Owen, the property passed into the hands of the late Hon. Sir Anthony Berry MP. He lived at Warbrook with his family until 1975. After a brief period when the property was virtually empty, its present owners restored the house and Warbrook became a hotel, conference and training centre.
