= Expiation (disambiguation) =

Expiation is another word for atonement, the removal of guilt or making of amends.

Expiation may also refer to:

- Expiation (film), a silent 1922 British crime film
- "Expiation" (Lewis), a 2007 television episode
- Expiation, a 1929 novel by Elizabeth Von Arnim
