= Ronald Neame =

English filmmaker and cinematographer (1911–2010)

Ronald Neame CBE BSC
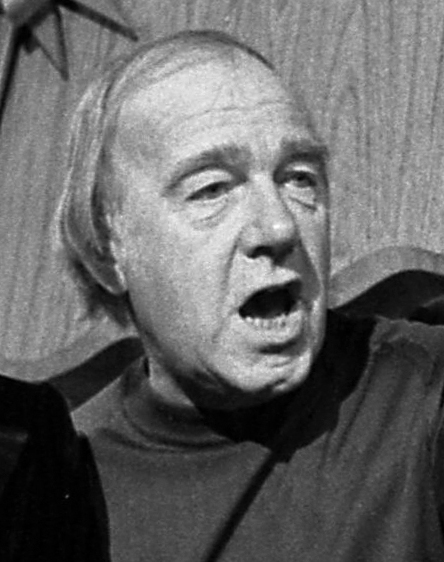
- Neame in 1972, on the set of The Poseidon Adventure
- Born: 23 April 1911; Hendon, Middlesex, England
- Died: 16 June 2010 (aged 99); Los Angeles, California, U.S.
- Citizenship: United Kingdom
- Education: Hurstpierpoint College
- Alma mater: University College School
- Occupations: Film director; cinematographer; producer; screenwriter
- Years active: 1928–1991
- Spouse(s): Beryl Heanly (m. 1933; div. 1992) Donna Bernice Friedberg (m. 1993)
- Children: Christopher Neame
- Parent(s): Ivy Close; Elwin Neame

Ronald Neame CBE, BSC (23 April 1911 – 16 June 2010) was an English filmmaker. Beginning his career as a cinematographer, for his work on the British war film One of Our Aircraft Is Missing (1943) he received a nomination for the Academy Award for Best Visual Effects. During a partnership with director David Lean, he produced Brief Encounter (1945), Great Expectations (1946), and Oliver Twist (1948), receiving two nominations for the Academy Award for Best Adapted Screenplay.

Neame then moved into directing, and some notable films included, The Man Who Never Was (1956), which chronicled Operation Mincemeat, a British WWII deception operation, The Prime of Miss Jean Brodie (1969), starring Maggie Smith in an Academy Award–winning title role, and the action-adventure disaster film The Poseidon Adventure (1972). He also directed I Could Go On Singing (1963), Judy Garland's last film, and Scrooge (1970), starring Albert Finney.

For his contributions to the film industry, in 1996 Neame was appointed a Commander of the Order of the British Empire (CBE) and received two BAFTA Awards, including the BAFTA Fellowship, BAFTA's highest honour.

== Life and career ==
=== Early years ===
Born in Hendon, Middlesex, Neame was the son of photographer Elwin Neame and actress Ivy Close. He studied at University College School and Hurstpierpoint College. His father died in 1923, and Neame took a job with the Anglo-Persian Oil Company as an office boy. Later, through his mother's contacts in the British film industry, Neame started at Elstree Studios as a messenger boy.

He was fortunate enough to be hired as an assistant cameraman on Blackmail (1929), the first British talkie, directed by a young Alfred Hitchcock. Neame's own career as a cinematographer began with the musical comedy Happy (1933), and he continued to develop his skills in various "quota quickies" films for several years.

His credits as cinematographer include Major Barbara (1941), In Which We Serve (1942), and One of Our Aircraft Is Missing. At the 15th Academy Awards, In Which We Serve won an Academy Honorary Award, and Neame was nominated for an Best Special Effects for his camerawork on One of Our Aircraft Is Missing.

=== As producer and screenwriter ===
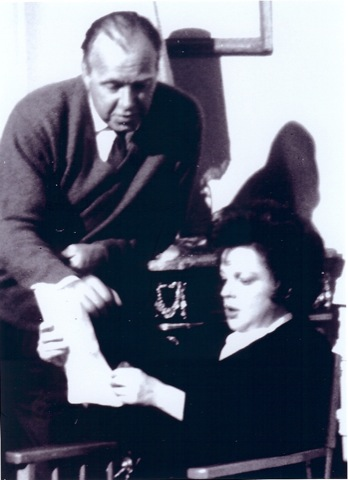
Neame and Judy Garland on the set of I Could Go On Singing

Following the success of In Which We Serve, director David Lean, associate producer Anthony Havelock-Allan, and cinematographer Neame formed a new production company together, Cineguild. Though the company only produced nine films between 1944 and 1950, it launched the directing careers of Lean and Neame and the producing career of Havelock-Allan.

The trio's first three films were adaptations of Coward's works: This Happy Breed, Blithe Spirit, and Brief Encounter. All three films were Directed by Lean, shot by Neame, produced by Havelock-Allan, and co-written from all three. Brief Encounter, which was adapted from Coward's one-act play Still Life, earned all three partners an Academy Award for Best Adapted Screenplay nomination.

Following their success adapting Coward, the trio decided to adapt the works of Charles Dickens. Their screenplay for their first adaptation, Great Expectations, earned the trio another Academy Award nomination. The film also marked an important shift in Neame's career, as it was his first film on which he was not cinematographer. Instead, he served as a producer alongside Havelock-Allan. The next year, he made his directorial debut with Take My Life, again produced by Havelock-Allan.

Cineguild's next film, Oliver Twist, was the beginning of the end for the production company. The film received criticism for antisemitism as a result of Alec Guinness' portrayal of Fagin. It was Havelock-Allan's last film with the company. Neame produced one more film for Cineguild, Lean's The Passionate Friends, before leaving to write, produce, and direct Golden Salamander. Lean's next film, Madeleine, was Cineguild's last, and the only Cineguild production without Neame or Havelock-Allan.

Following Cineguild's dissolution, Neame produced The Magic Box (1951), a screen biography directed by John Boulting about the life of British camera inventor William Friese-Greene, which was the film project for the Festival of Britain.

=== As director ===
Neame made his directorial debut under the Cineguild banner, with Take My Life (1947), which was released by British producer J. Arthur Rank's General Film Distributors in the United Kingdom in 1947 and by Rank's Eagle-Lion Films in the United States in 1949. Neame began a transition to the American film industry at the suggestion of Rank, who asked him to study the Hollywood production system.

He worked again with Alec Guinness (whom he had worked with on Great Expectations and Oliver Twist), this time as director, in three films: The Card (1952), The Horse's Mouth (1958), and Tunes of Glory (1960). Neame described Tunes of Glory as "the film I am proudest of". He received two BAFTA Award nominations for Tunes of Glory. Neame and Guinness worked again on the musical Scrooge (1970) with Guinness playing the ghost of Jacob Marley to Albert Finney's Ebenezer Scrooge.

Neame also directed I Could Go On Singing (1963), Judy Garland's last film, co-starring Dirk Bogarde; and The Prime of Miss Jean Brodie (1969), which won Maggie Smith her first Oscar.

Neame was recruited to direct The Poseidon Adventure (1972) after the contracted director left the production. He later characterised The Poseidon Adventure as "my favourite film" because it earned him enough to retire comfortably. He enjoyed a long friendship with Walter Matthau, whom he directed in two later films, Hopscotch (1980) and First Monday in October (1981).

Neame's final feature-length film, Foreign Body, a comedy starring Victor Banerjee, was filmed in England and released in 1986.

== Honours ==
In 1996, Neame was appointed a Commander of the Order of the British Empire (CBE) and awarded the BAFTA Fellowship for his contributions to the film industry.

== Personal life ==
Neame married Beryl Heanly in 1933. They legally separated in 1971 and divorced in 1992. She died in 1999. The couple had one son, Christopher, a writer/producer who died one year after his father's death. Ronald's only grandson, Gareth Neame, is a successful television producer, who represents the fourth generation of Neames in the film industry. Ronnie Neame's second marriage took place in Santa Barbara on 12 September 1993. His wife, Donna Bernice Friedberg, is also in the business – a film researcher and television producer, who worked on his 1979 film Meteor. He referred to their meeting as a "coup de foudre". He had homes in Beverly Hills and Santa Barbara, California.

In 2003, Neame published an autobiography, Straight from the Horse's Mouth. (ISBN 978-0810844902)

=== Death ===
Neame died on 16 June 2010 after suffering complications from a broken leg. The break required two surgical procedures from which Neame never recovered.

In an interview in 2006, he jokingly stated, "When people ask me about the secret to my longevity, I say the honest answer is two large vodkas at lunchtime and three large scotches in the evening. All my doctors have said to me, 'Ronnie, if you would drink less, you'd live a lot longer.' But, they're all dead, and I'm still here at 95."

== Filmography ==
Year	Title	Director	Writer	Producer	Other	Notes
1944	This Happy Breed	No	Yes	Associate	Yes	Co-writer with David Lean and Anthony Havelock-Allan; Also director of photography
1945	Brief Encounter	No	Yes	Uncredited	Yes	Co-writer with David Lean, Anthony Havelock-Allan and Noël Coward; Also production manager and director of addtl. photography
1945	Blithe Spirit	No	Yes	No	Yes	Also director of photography
1946	Great Expectations	No	Yes	Yes	No	Co-writer with David Lean and Anthony Havelock-Allan
1947	Take My Life	Yes	No	No	No	Directorial Debut
1950	Golden Salamander	Yes	Yes	Yes	No	Co-writer with Victor Canning and Lesley Storm
1952	The Card	Yes	No	No	No	
1953	The Million Pound Note	Yes	No	No	No	
1956	The Man Who Never Was	Yes	No	No	No	
1957	The Seventh Sin	Yes	No	No	No	
1957	Windom's Way	Yes	No	No	No	
1958	The Horse's Mouth	Yes	No	Yes	No	
1960	Tunes of Glory	Yes	No	No	No	
1962	Escape from Zahrain	Yes	No	Yes	No	
1963	I Could Go On Singing	Yes	No	No	No	
1964	The Chalk Garden	Yes	No	No	No	
1965	Mister Moses	Yes	No	No	No	
1966	A Man Could Get Killed	Yes	No	No	No	Replaced Cliff Owen
1966	Gambit	Yes	No	No	No	
1968	Prudence and the Pill	Uncredited	No	No	No	Replaced Fielder Cook
1969	The Prime of Miss Jean Brodie	Yes	No	No	No	
1970	Hello-Goodbye	Uncredited	No	No	No	Replaced by Jean Negulesco after a few weeks
1970	Scrooge	Yes	No	No	No	
1972	The Poseidon Adventure	Yes	No	No	No	
1974	The Odessa File	Yes	No	No	No	
1979	Meteor	Yes	No	No	Yes	Also actor; as 'British Representative'
1980	Hopscotch	Yes	No	No	No	
1981	First Monday in October	Yes	No	No	Yes	Also actor; as 'PA Speaker' (uncredited)
1986	Foreign Body	Yes	No	No	No	
1990	The Magic Balloon	Yes	Yes	No	No	Short film

=== Producer only ===
Year	Title	Director	Notes
1948	Oliver Twist	David Lean	
1949	The Passionate Friends	David Lean	
1951	The Magic Box	John Boulting	

=== Director of photography only ===
Year	Title	Director	Notes
1935	Drake of England	Arthur B. Woods	
1935	Invitation to the Waltz	Paul Merzbach	
1935	Joy Ride	Harry Hughes	
1935	Honours Easy	Herbert Brenon	
1936	The Improper Duchess	Harry Hughes	
1936	King of the Castle	Redd Davis	
1936	Music Hath Charms	Thomas Bentley	
1936	The Crimes of Stephen Hawke	George King	
1936	A Star Fell from Heaven	Paul Merzbach	
1936	Reasonable Doubt	George King	
1936	The Scarab Murder Case	Michael Hankinson	
1937	Strange Experiment	Albert Parker	
1937	Feather Your Nest	William Beaudine	
1937	Radio Lover	Paul Capon; Austin Melford	
1937	Cafe Colette	Paul L. Stein	
1937	Catch as Catch Can	Roy Kellino	
1937	Brief Ecstasy	Edmond T. Gréville	
1937	Variety Hour	Redd Davis	
1937	Against the Tide	Alex Bryce	
1937	Keep Fit	Anthony Kimmins	
1937	Member of the Jury	Bernard Mainwaring	
1938	The Gaunt Stranger	Walter Forde	
1938	I See Ice	Anthony Kimmins	
1938	Second Thoughts	Albert Parker	
1938	Murder in the Family	Albert Parker	
1938	Who Goes Next?	Maurice Elvey	
1938	Penny Paradise	Carol Reed	
1938	It's in the Air	Anthony Kimmins	
1938	The Ware Case	Robert Stevenson	
1939	Young Man's Fancy	Robert Stevenson	
1939	Let's Be Famous	Walter Forde	
1939	The Four Just Men	Walter Forde	
1939	Cheer Boys Cheer	Walter Forde	
1939	Trouble Brewing	Anthony Kimmins	
1939	Come on George!	Anthony Kimmins	
1940	Return to Yesterday	Robert Stevenson	
1940	Let George Do It!	Marcel Varnel	
1940	Saloon Bar	Walter Forde	
1941	Major Barbara	Gabriel Pascal	
1941	A Yank in the R.A.F.	Henry King	Aerial unit photography
1942	One of Our Aircraft Is Missing	Michael Powell; Emeric Pressburger	
1942	In Which We Serve	Noël Coward; David Lean	

== Awards and nominations ==
Institution	Year	Category	Work	Result	Ref.
Academy Awards	1943	Best Effects, Special Effects	One of Our Aircraft Is Missing	Nominated	
Academy Awards	1947	Best Writing, Screenplay	Brief Encounter	Nominated	
Academy Awards	1948	Best Writing, Screenplay	Great Expectations	Nominated	
British Academy Film Awards	1961	Best Film	Tunes of Glory	Nominated	
British Academy Film Awards	1961	Outstanding British Film	Tunes of Glory	Nominated	
British Academy Film Awards	2005	Lifetime Contributions to International Film	—N/a	Won	
Cannes Film Festival	1956	Palme d'Or	The Man Who Never Was	Nominated	
Cannes Film Festival	1969	Palme d'Or	The Prime of Miss Jean Brodie	Nominated	
Hugo Awards	1996	Best Dramatic Presentation	Blithe Spirit	Nominated	
Locarno Film Festival	1950	Special Mention	Golden Salamander	Won	
Taormina Film Fest	1962	Golden Charybdis	Escape from Zahrain	Won	
Venice Film Festival	1958	Golden Lion	The Horse's Mouth	Nominated	
Venice Film Festival	1960	Golden Lion	Tunes of Glory	Nominated	

== See also ==
- List of British film directors
- List of Academy Award winners and nominees from Great Britain

== Bibliography ==
- Neame, Ronald (2003). Straight from the Horse's Mouth. Lanham, Maryland & Oxford: Scarecrow Press. ISBN 0810844907.
