= Janette Ranken Thesiger =

English actress

Janette Mary Fernie Ranken
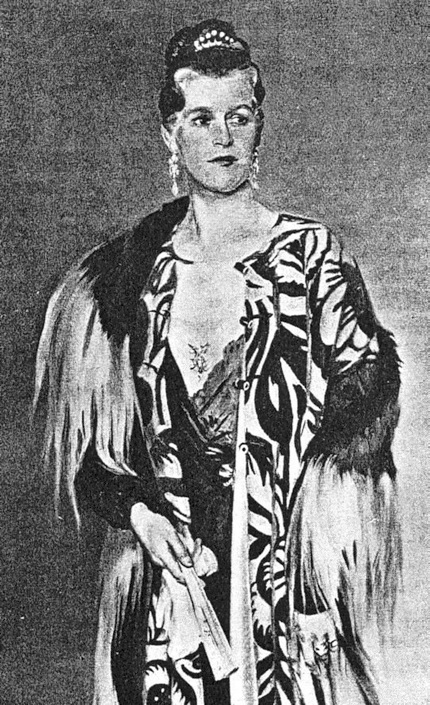
- Janette Ranken Thesiger by William Bruce Ellis Ranken, 1917
- Born: 16 December 1877; Edinburgh, Scotland
- Died: 21 May 1970 (aged 92)
- Other name: Juliet Hardinge
- Occupation: Actress
- Spouse: Ernest Thesiger
- Relatives: William Bruce Ellis Ranken (brother)

Janette Mary Fernie Ranken (married name Thesiger) (16 December 1877 – 21 May 1970) was an English actress who worked under the name of Juliet Hardinge. She was the wife of actor Ernest Thesiger and sister of the painter William Bruce Ellis Ranken.

== Biography ==
Janette Mary Fernie Ranken was born in 1877, in a prosperous Edinburgh family, the daughter of Robert Burt Ranken (1840-1902) and Mary Witherington Dunlop. The painter William Bruce Ellis Ranken was her brother.

Ranken attended Oxford University where she met Margaret Jourdain. They moved to London and lived together. But Ernest Thesiger, who knew Ranken through her brother William, proposed a white marriage to Ranken, and she accepted. She left Jourdain and on 30 May 1917 Janette Ranken married Ernest Thesiger. Hilary Spurling, biographer of Ivy Compton-Burnett, who was friend of Ernest Thesiger through Jourdain, suggests that Thesiger and Janette wed largely out of their mutual adoration of William, who shaved his head when he learned of the engagement. Ernest Thesiger does not mention Janette in his memoir, Practically True, even if they had a public life together, and Richard Thesiger, Ernest's nephew, said to Spurling that Janette Thesiger told him the marriage had never been consummated.

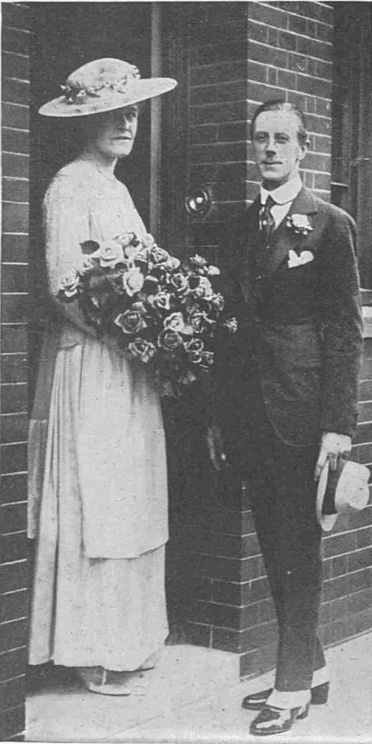
Janette Ranken and Ernest Thesiger

In the 1920s, Ranken was President of the West London Branch of the Theosophical Society. She was also Editor of the magazine Theosophy in the British Isles. She gave lectures like "The Web of Life" and "Some Problems of the Present". She was a member of the Society for Psychical Research.

At her brother's death in 1941, Janette Ranken gifted over 200 works to be distributed amongst English public galleries and museums.

She died on 21 May 1970.

== Career ==
- 1903, "The Vikings", Imperial Theatre, London (Extra)
- 1903, "Snowdrop and the Seven Little Men", Court Theatre, London (Queen)
- 1904, "The Libation Bearers", Royal Shakespeare Company (Spirit)
- 1904, "The Tempest", Royal Shakespeare Company (Chorus)
- 1904, "The Knight of the Burning Pestle", Royalty Theatre, London (Pompiona)
- 1906, "Sunday", Lyceum Thatre, Newport (Nun)
- 1908, "The Importance of Being Earnest", Scala Theatre, London (with Ernest Thesiger)
- 1908, "Faust", His Majesty’s Theatre, London (Magda)
- 1908, "The Beloved Vagabond", Royal Theatre, Dublin (Lady Rushworth)
- 1908, "The Bacchae", Court Theatre, London (Chorus)
- 1909, "The High Bid", His Majesty’s Theatre, London (English Tourist)
- 1909, "The Dancing Girl", His Majesty’s Theatre, London (Lady Brislington)
- 1909, "Romeo and Juliet", Court Theatre, London (Chorus)
- 1910, Dramatic reading of "Richard III", British Empire Shakespeare Society, Botanic Theatre, University College, London (Chorus)
- 1910, Dramatic reading of "Richard III", British Empire Shakespeare Society, Victoria Hall, London
- 1925, Peach Ball, Claridge’s, in aid of Ellen Terry Homes for Blind Children (with Ernest Thesiger)

== Gallery ==
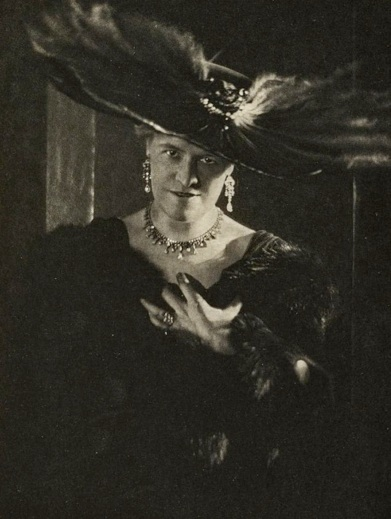
Janette Ranken, 1912, by Baron Adolph de Meyer

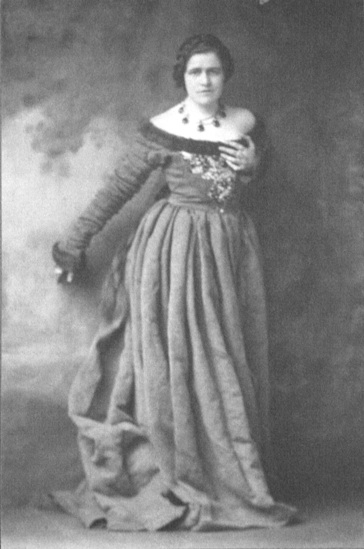
Janette Mary Fernie Ranken as Juliet Hardinge
