= Missing the Tide =

- Directed by: Walter West
- Written by: Alfred Turner (novel); R. Byron Webber
- Starring: Violet Hopson; Basil Gill; Ivy Close; Gerald Ames
- Production company: Broadwest Films
- Distributed by: Broadwest Films
- Release date: January 1918
- Country: United Kingdom
- Languages: Silent; English intertitles

Missing the Tide is a 1918 British silent drama film directed by Walter West and starring Violet Hopson, Basil Gill and Ivy Close. The film is based on a novel by Alfred Turner. The screenplay concerns a woman who leaves her cruel husband for another man, only to discover that he has recently got married.

== Cast ==
- Violet Hopson as Margaret Carson
- Basil Gill as Sir Felix Faber
- Ivy Close as Letty Fairfax
- Gerald Ames as Capt. Harry Wyndham
- James Lindsay as Carson
- Nicholas Hopson Worster as The child

== Bibliography ==
- Goble, Alan. The Complete Index to Literary Sources in Film. Walter de Gruyter, 1999.
- Low, Rachael. The History of British Film, Volume III: 1914-1918. Routledge, 1997.
