= Radio Lover =

- Opening titles
- Directed by: Paul Capon; Austin Melford
- Written by: Ian Dalrymple; Elma Dangerfield
- Produced by: Ernest King
- Starring: Wylie Watson; Jack Melford; Ann Penn; Betty Ann Davies
- Cinematography: Ronald Neame
- Music by: Eric Spear
- Production company: City Film Corporation
- Distributed by: Associated British Film Distributors
- Release date: 5 April 1937
- Running time: 64 minutes
- Country: United Kingdom
- Language: English

Radio Lover is a 1936 British comedy film directed by Paul Capon and Austin Melford and starring Wylie Watson, Jack Melford, Ann Penn and Betty Ann Davies. It was written by Ian Dalrymple and Elma Dangerfield.

== Plot ==
Hard-up Reggie Clifford meets Lancastrian plasterer Joe Morrison, who, despite his rough-and-ready looks, has a beautiful singing voice. Clifford hatches a plan to get a big broadcasting company to employ them both, with him as a singer called "The Radio Lover," but actually using Morrison's voice. However Miss Oliphant, a radical member of the radio station's board, does not approve of the arrangement.

== Cast ==
- Wylie Watson as Joe Morrison
- Jack Melford as Reggie Clifford
- Ann Penn as Miss Oliphant
- Betty Ann Davies as Wendy Maradyck
- Cynthia Stock as Miss Swindon
- Gerald Barry as Sir Hector
- Max Faber as Brian Maradyck
- Eric Pavitt as boy

== Reception ==
The Monthly Film Bulletin wrote: "The story is neatly and closely constructed, and a steady flow of interest and amusement is maintained to the climax. The singing is attractive and Wylie Watson and Jack Melford act capitally and are careful to preserve the element of realism which gives the absurd situations the full benefit of contrast. Excellent photography is a feature of the film."

The Daily Film Renter wrote: "Developed to tune of hilarious misunderstandings provoked by great scheme, subject pokes gentle fun at broadcasting bureaucracy, and takes in tuneful song numbers en route. Wylie Watson gives robust study in lead, capitally supported by Jack Melford as go-getter ideas merchant. ... Pleasant light entertainment of popular type."

Kine Weekly wrote: "Bright, topical romantic comedy of radio-land, reinforcing story ingenuity with nimble shafts of good-humoured satire. The lively plot is so penned as to provide the co-comedians, Wylie Watson and Jack Melford, with ample scope for their talents, while supporting them is a cast of equitable resource and neat technical work. The film definitely has an idea behind its fooling, and coupled with this is sharp acknowledgment of the importance of feminine appeal. The parallel love interest is as cheery and entertaining as the central theme. Good two-feature programme booking for all classes."
