= Nelson (1918 film) =

1918 film

- Directed by: Maurice Elvey
- Starring: Donald Calthrop; Malvina Longfellow; Ivy Close
- Release date: 1918
- Running time: 126 minutes
- Country: United Kingdom
- Language: Silent (English intertitles)

Nelson, also cited as Nelson: The Story of England's Immortal Naval Hero, is a 1918 British historical film directed by Maurice Elvey and starring Donald Calthrop, Malvina Longfellow and Ivy Close. Its screenplay is based on the biography of Admiral Horatio Nelson by Robert Southey.

== Cast ==
- Donald Calthrop - Horatio Nelson
- Malvina Longfellow - Lady Hamilton
- Ivy Close - Mrs. Nesbit
- Ernest Thesiger - Wiliam Pitt
- Allan Jeayes - Sir William Hamilton
- Edward O'Neill - King of Naples
- Teddy Arundell - Captain Berry
- Eric Barker - Nelson as a child
