= William Bruce Ellis Ranken =

British painter

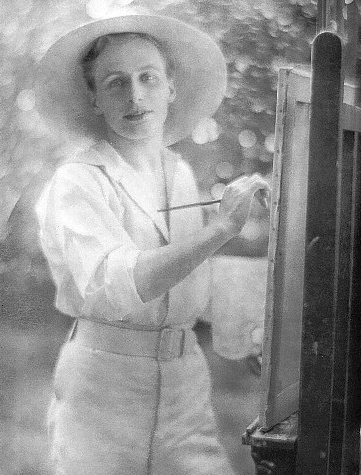
- Ranken photographed by Baron Adolph de Meyer in 1902
- Born: 11 April 1881; Edinburgh, Scotland
- Died: 31 March 1941 (aged 59); London, England

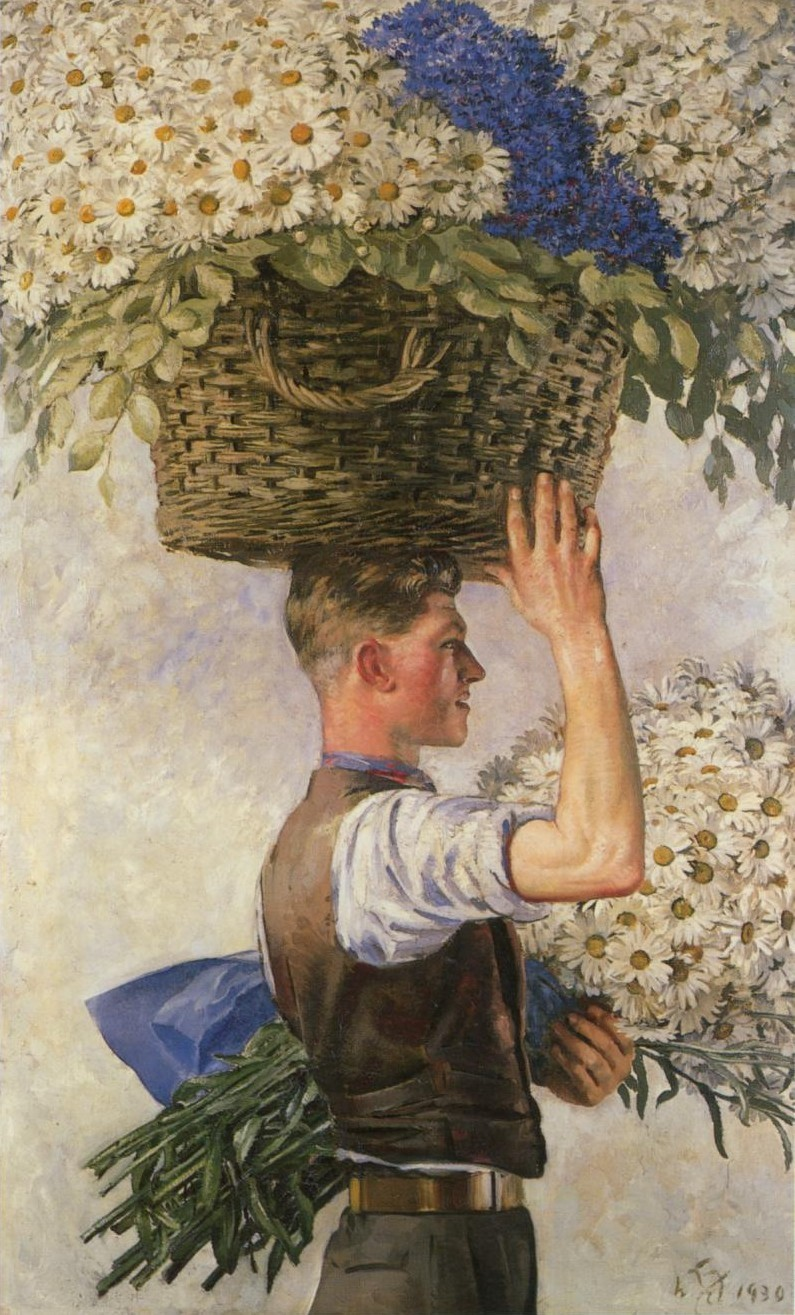
Covent Garden, a 1930 portrait by Ranken

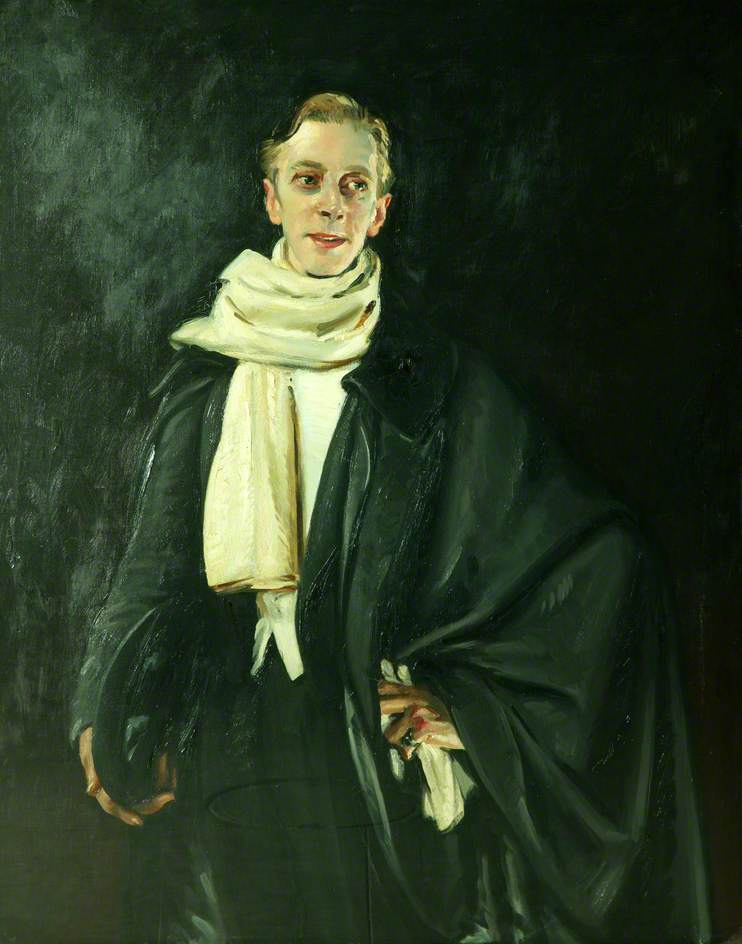
Portrait of Ernest Thesiger by Ranken in Manchester Art Gallery

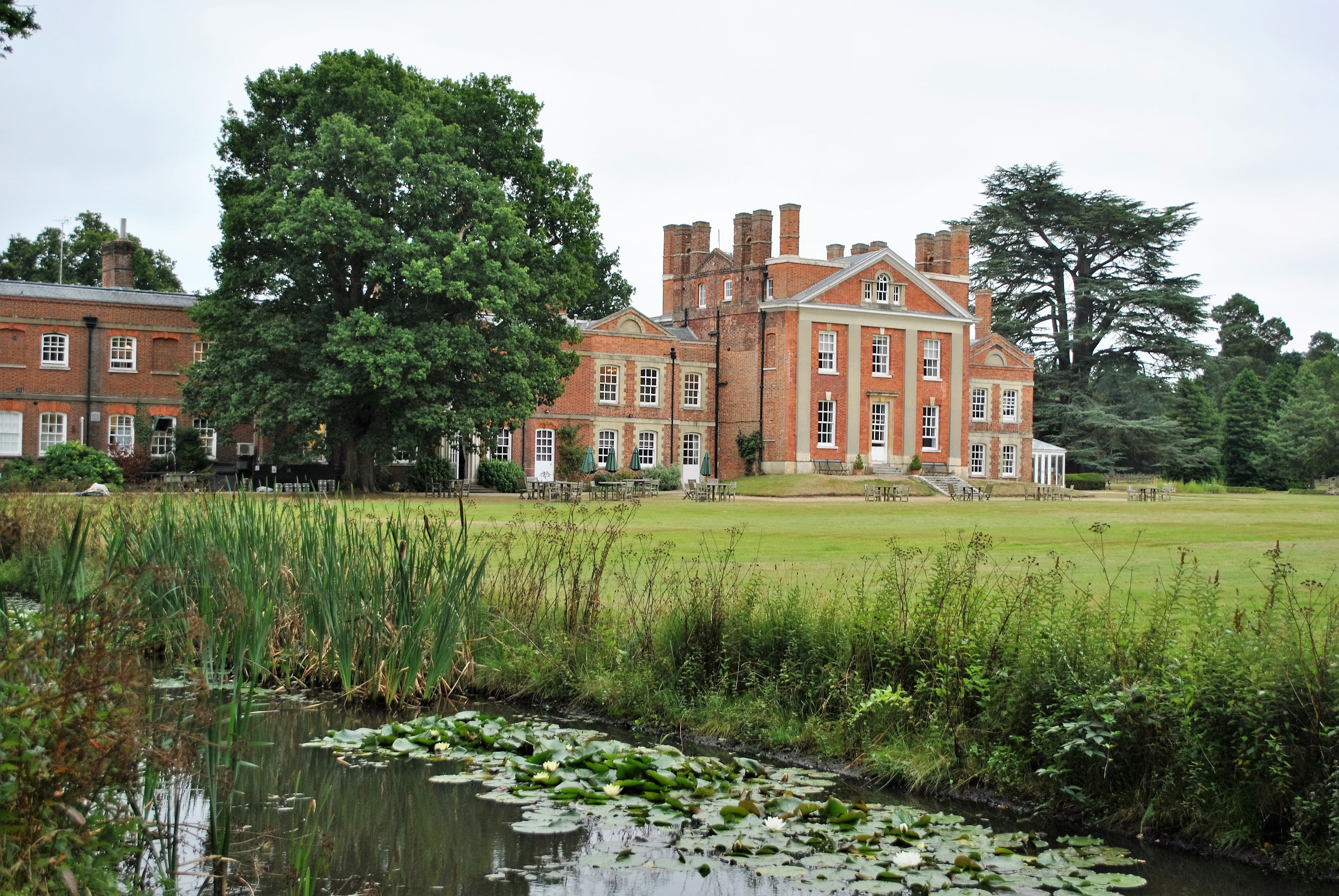
Warbrook House in Hampshire

William Bruce Ellis Ranken (11 April 1881 – 31 March 1941) was a British artist and Edwardian aesthete.

== Early life and education ==
He was born in Edinburgh, Scotland, to Robert Burt Ranken, a wealthy and successful lawyer, and his wife Mary. He attended Eton College in Eton, Berkshire, and then the Slade School of Art, where he studied under the tutelage of Henry Tonks.

A fellow student was the actor Ernest Thesiger, who became a lifelong friend; he was painted by Ranken in 1918, and married Ranken's sister Janette Ranken in 1917.

== Career ==
Ranken's first exhibition in 1904 at the Carfax Gallery, managed by John Fothergill and William Rothenstein, in London was well received by artists and art critics. He befriended Wilfrid de Glehn and John Singer Sargent. At the outbreak of World War I, Ranken was living at his studio in Chelsea, a short distance from Sargent's studio, with whom he may have ventured to America during the war years.

While in the United States, Sargent introduced him to Isabella Stewart Gardner, and he received commissions to paint portraits of the wealthy, including the Whitneys, Vanderbilts and Havermeyers. His output became prodigious as he worked in watercolors, oils and pastels. Returning to Britain in the 1920s, he painted many portraits of the British royal family and the aristocracy, as well as the interiors of their homes.

In France during the World War I as a distraction from the trenches, he collected and repaired historical pieces of embroidery for sale with Ernest Thesiger who was invalided and, in 1917, married Ranken's sister, Janette Mary Fernie Ranken (1877-1970). In her biography of Thesiger's friend, Ivy Compton-Burnett, Hilary Spurling suggests that Thesiger and Janette wed largely out of their mutual adoration of Ranken, who shaved his head when he learned of the engagement. On the other hand, it has been said that Janette Ranken was in love with Compton-Burnett's companion, Margaret Jourdain, a fellow Oxford student. Janette Ranken left Jourdain to marry Thesiger.

In 1918, Ranken purchased Warbrook House in Eversley, Hampshire, after the success of his first visit to the United States. The maintenance and costs associated with the property proved to be too much in the depression of the early 1930s, and he was forced to give up his beloved house. Ranken died suddenly in London in 1941 and was buried near Warbrook, at St Mary (the church is off the A327 road, about 2 miles from the A30).

=== Public collections ===
Following his unexpected death from a cerebral haemorrhage, his sister Janette gifted over 200 works to be distributed amongst UK public galleries and museums. Ranken's paintings are held in a large number of museum and public collections, including Southampton City Art Gallery, Portsmouth Museum, Bradford Museum, Reading Museum, Bristol Museum and Art Gallery, Northampton Museum, Derby Museum, Leeds City Museum, National Museums Northern Ireland, Glasgow Museums, City of Edinburgh Council and the Government Art Collection.
