= Clare Greet =

English actress (1871–1939)

- As Mistress Quickly, 1926
- Born: Clara Greet; 14 June 1871; Leicestershire, England
- Died: 14 February 1939 (aged 67); London, England
- Occupation: Actress
- Years active: 1891–1939

Clare Greet (14 June 1871 – 14 February 1939) was an English stage and film actress.

She began on stage in Shakespeare with the Ben Greet Company and later played many roles in the West End between 1907 and 1938. The premieres in which she played included Bernard Shaw's The Doctor's Dilemma, Major Barbara and Androcles and the Lion. She appeared in films between 1921 and 1939.

== Life and career ==
Clare Greet was born on 14 June 1871, the daughter of John Greet and his wife Fanny. She was educated privately at Leamington Spa and then attended the Girls' College, Brighton. She studied for the stage under Hermann Vezin, Emile Behnke, and Ben Greet (to whom she was no relation). She made her first appearance on the stage in 1891 with the Ben Greet Company, in which she played numerous parts in Shakespearean plays and old comedy. She was then engaged by John Hare for the Garrick Theatre, where she understudied; she subsequently toured with him, and then with William Calvert and subsequently with Grace Hawthorne, as Stephanie in A Royal Divorce, and Antonin in Theodora .

In 1893 Greet played an engagement at the Pavilion Theatre, Whitechapel, where she appeared as Louisa Anne Ferguson in The English Rose, Joyce in East Lynne, Minnie in Nance, Peggy Chudleigh in The Harbour Lights and Moya in The Shaughraun. She made her first appearance in the West End at the Strand on 10 May 1894, as Hetty in The Love Letter. In the same year she was engaged at the Avenue as understudy in Arms and the Man, in which she appeared as Louka on several occasions.

Greet toured in the US with Lillian Russell, and in the British provinces with May Fortescue and next toured as Mrs. Bagot in Trilby, and subsequently as Madame Vinard. She toured with Sidney Brough as Mrs Pomfret in The Paper Chase, and toured in South Africa in Two Little Vagabonds, East Lynne, Confusion and The Two Orphans. Her later West End roles were:

Role	Date	Theatre
April 1898	Supernumerary in The Club Baby	Avenue
October 1903	Lisette in The Duchess of Dantzic	Lyric
1905–06	Emmy in The Doctor's Dilemma; Rummy Mitchens in Major Barbara; Amy Watersmith in The Convict on the Hearth; Queer in Prunella	Court
March 1907	Lady Helda in My Darling	Hicks
May 1908	Susan Pottle in Feed the Brute	Royalty
December 1908	Miss Deans in The Last of the De Mullins	Haymarket
December 1908	Tulpe in Hannele	His Majesty's
June 1909	Nan Curtis in Kit's Woman	Court
November 1909	Mary Byrne in The Tinker's Wedding	His Majesty's
January 1910	Mrs Fisherick in Tilda's New Hat and Mrs Hoskins in The Parent's Progress	Prince of Wales's
April 1910	Mrs Duckett in The Naked Truth	Wyndham's
February 1911	Mrs Mason in All that Matters	Haymarket
November 1911	Martha in The War God	His Majesty's
December 1911	Kvashnya in The Lower Depths	Kingsway
December 1911	Mrs Spiers in Esther Waters	Apollo
February 1912	Mrs Upjohn in The "Mind the Paint" Girl	Duke of York's
June 1912	Mrs Bedwin in Oliver Twist	His Majesty's
May 1913	Mrs Clegg in Jane Clegg	Court
September 1913	Megaera in Androcles and the Lion	St James's
October 1913	Bente in The Witch	St James's
December 1913	Gina Ekdal in The Wild Duck and Mrs Pargetter in Nan	St James's
April 1915	Mrs Burtenshaw in Keeping Up Appearances	Savoy
May 1915	Frieda Grunau in The Day Before the Day	St James's
December 1915	Mrs Bunting in Who is He ?	Haymarket
April 1916	Mrs Chope in The Mayor of Troy	Haymarket
June 1916	Jane in the "all-star" cast of The Admirable Crichton	Coliseum and London Opera House
July 1916	Mrs Clugston in The Rotters	Garrick
December 1917	Mrs Bodfish in the "all-star" cast of The Man from Blankley's	His Majesty's
September 1918	Mrs Beckett in A Week End	Kingsway
December 1918	Mrs Lester Keene in Scandal	Strand
April 1919	Mary Scattergood in Time to Wake Up	New Theatre
September 1919	Mrs Cook in Too Many Cooks	Savoy
December 1919	toured in Holland and Belgium in Mid-Channel and Candida	Savoy
March 1920	Maggie Hey in Tom Trouble	Holborn Empire
June 1920	Mrs Brewberry in The Old House	Court
June 1921	Mrs Ritchie in The Wrong Number	Duke of York's
April 1922	The Cook in Windows	Court
July 1922	Mrs Clegg in Jane Clegg	New
December 1922	Mrs Hawley in Hawley's of the High Street and Mrs Horton in Through the Crack	Apollo
January 1923	Mrs Hazard in Plus Fours	Haymarket
March 1923	Mrs Carlton in Marriage by Instalments	Ambassadors'
October 1923	Mrs Midgett in Outward Bound	Everyman
December 1924	Mrs Glanville in The Tyranny of Home	Everyman
March and May 1925	Mrs Drennan in The Round Table	Q and Wyndham's
June 1925	Innkeeper's Wife in The Man With a Load of Mischief	Haymarket
October 1926	Burrage in The Rat Trap	Everyman
May 1927	Mrs Ransome in The Combined Maze	Royalty
September 1927	Margaret in The Father	Apollo
January 1928	Mrs Midgett in Outward Bound	Prince of Wales's
February 1928	Lady Dodd in Our Idols	Little
March 1928	Bridget O'Rourke in Square Crooks	Prince of Wales's
June 1928	Mrs Cass in Tell Me the Truth	Ambassadors'
November 1928	Mrs Hockin in Out of the Sea	Strand
April 1929	Mrs Bewley in Mariners	Wyndham's
May 1929	Mrs Clegg in Jane Clegg	Wyndham's
May 1930	Mrs Flinker in Our Ostriches	Royalty
October 1930	Mrs Bothways in Lucky Dip	Comedy
May 1931	Mrs Midships in The Mantle	Arts
June 1931	Nannie in Marry Leisure	Haymarket
May 1932	Mrs Hardcastle in She Stoops to Conquer	Kingsway
December 1932	Mrs Puffy in The Streets of London	Ambassadors'
December 1933	Old Woman in What Happened to George	Wyndham's
April 1935	Lizzie in The Magic Cupboard	King's Hammersmith
November 1935	Rummy Mitchens in Major Barbara	Q
June 1936	Frida in Thistledown	Chanticleer
October 1936	Maid in Plot Twenty-One	Embassy
December 1937	Woodie in Talk of the Devil	Piccadilly
June 1938	Madame Jus in My Crime	"Q"
September 1938	Mrs Cross, Senior in The Judge	"Q"

Greet died in her sleep at her flat in Chelsea on 14 February 1939, aged 67.

== Partial filmography ==
- The Rotters (1921) as Mrs. Clugson
- Love at the Wheel (1921) as Martha
- Three Live Ghosts (1922) as Mrs. Gubbins
- Number 13 (1922) as Mrs. Peabody
- The Farmer from Texas (1925) as Frau Appelboom
- The Ring (1927) as Fortune Teller (uncredited)
- The Rising Generation (1928) as Cook
- The Manxman (1929) as Mrs. Cregeen
- Murder! (1930) as Member of the Jury
- Third Time Lucky (1931) as Mrs. Scratton
- Alibi (1931)
- Many Waters (1931) as Registry Office Cleaner (uncredited)
- Lord Babs (1932) as Mrs. Parker
- The Sign of Four (1932) as Mrs. Hudson (uncredited)
- White Face (1932) as Mrs. Albert
- Lord Camber's Ladies (1932) as Peach
- Channel Crossing (1933) as Anxious Passenger
- Mrs. Dane's Defence (1933) as Mrs. Bulsom-Porter
- The Pointing Finger (1933) as Landlady
- Little Friend (1934) as Mrs. Parry
- The Man Who Knew Too Much (1934) as Mrs. Brockett (uncredited)
- Emil and the Detectives (1935) as Grandma
- Maria Marten (1936) as Mrs. Marten
- Royal Eagle (1936)
- Sabotage (1936) as Mrs. Jones, Cook (uncredited)
- St. Martin's Lane (1938) as Old Maud
- Jamaica Inn (1939) as Granny Tremarney, Sir Humphrey's Tenant

== Sources ==
- Parker, John, ed. (1936). Who's Who in the Theatre (eighth ed.). London: Sir Isaac Pitman and Sons. OCLC 655107788.
