= The Irresistible Flapper =

1919 film by Frank Wilson

The Irresistible Flapper is a 1919 British silent comedy film directed by Frank Wilson and starring Violet Hopson, Ivy Close and Gerald Ames.

== Plot ==
A flapper rescues her less worldly-wise sister from social disgrace.

== Cast ==
- Violet Hopson - Gladys Standish
- Ivy Close - Audrey tremayne
- Gerald Ames - Victor Standish
- Basil Gill - Ormande York
- Charles Vane - Sir Neville Tremayne
- Ruby Belasco - Miss Frewin
- Iveah Stanley - Camille
- Madame d'Esterre - Lady Tremayne
- Frank Wilson - Vicar
