= Ernest Thesiger =

English actor (1879–1961)

Ernest Thesiger CBE
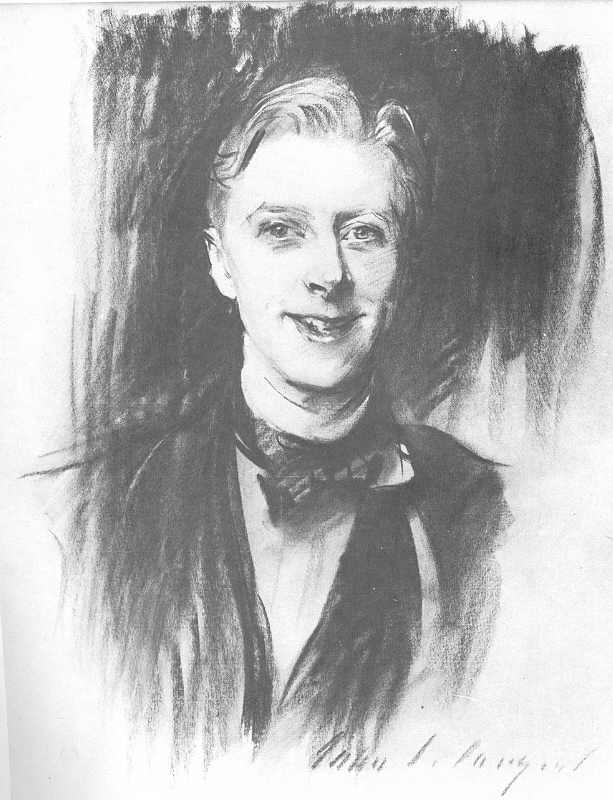
- A charcoal drawing of Thesiger by John Singer Sargent, c. 1911
- Born: Ernest Frederic Graham Thesiger; 15 January 1879; Chelsea, London, England
- Died: 14 January 1961 (aged 81); Kensington, London, England
- Years active: 1916–1961
- Spouse: Janette Mary Fernie Ranken (m. 1917)
- Relatives: 1st Lord Chelmsford (grandfather); 2nd Lord Chelmsford (uncle); 1st Viscount Chelmsford (cousin); Wilfred Thesiger (cousin); Robert Ranken (father-in-law); William Ranken (brother-in-law)
- Awards: Commander of the Order of the British Empire

Ernest Frederic Graham Thesiger (15 January 1879 – 14 January 1961) was an English stage and film actor. He is noted for his performance as Doctor Septimus Pretorius in James Whale's film Bride of Frankenstein (1935).

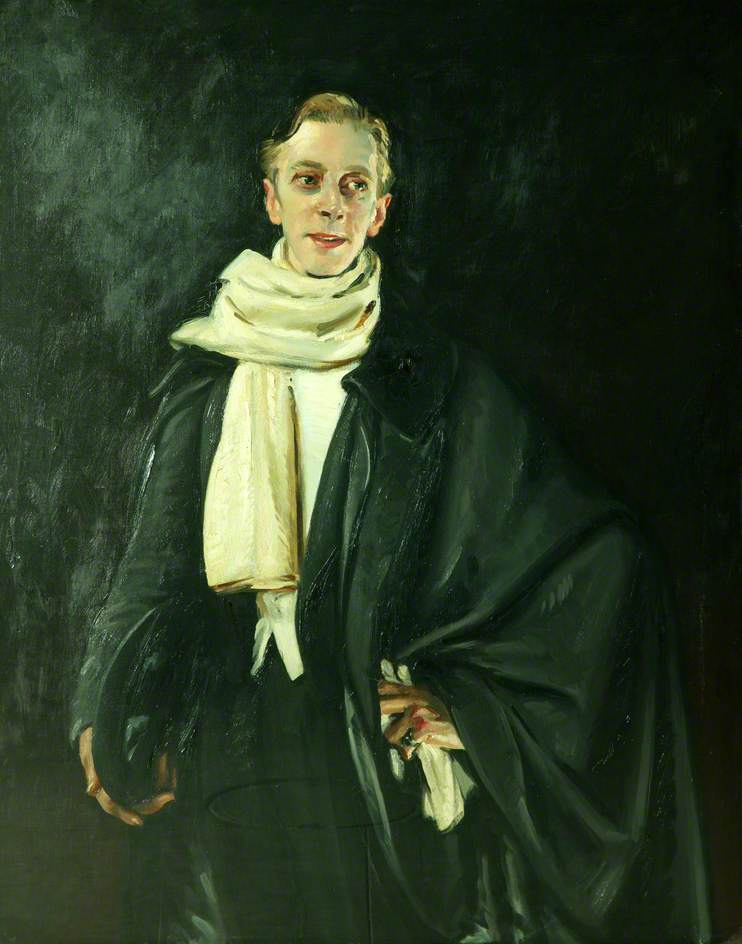
Portrait of Thesiger by William Ranken, Manchester City Galleries

== Early life ==
Ernest Thesiger was born 15 January 1879 in London. He was the third of four children of Hon. Sir Edward Peirson Thesiger (1842–1928), KCB, Clerk Assistant to Parliament, and Georgina Mary, daughter of William Bruce Stopford Sackville, of Drayton House, Thrapston, Northamptonshire, of the family of the Earl of Courtown. He was the grandson of the 1st Lord Chelmsford, first cousin once removed of the explorer and author Wilfred Thesiger (1910–2003), and the nephew of the 2nd Lord Chelmsford.

Thesiger attended Marlborough College and the Slade School of Art with aspirations of becoming a painter, but quickly switched to drama, making his professional debut in a production of Colonel Smith in 1909. He also processed with the Men's League for Women's Suffrage at the mass rally in 1909.

After the outbreak of World War I, on 31 August 1914, he volunteered with the British Army's Territorial Force, enlisting into the 2nd Battalion of the 9th London Regiment (Queen Victoria's Rifles), as Rifleman No.2546 at its Regimental Headquarters in London's West End. After training in England for three months, he was sent to the Western Front in late 1914 with the Q.V.R.'s 1st Battalion.

On 1 January 1915, he was wounded in the trenches, and medically evacuated back to England. His interest in needlework had begun with buying and repairing pieces of historical embroidery with his brother-in-law William Ranken while in France. After the incident in a barn explosion, his hands had been damaged and on return home, despite the Ministry of Pensions declaring it "too effeminate an occupation for men", Thesiger developed small sewing kits for soldiers similarly injured to provide activity and pain relief. This became The Disabled Soldiers' Embroidery Industry, 42 Ebury Street, London. As Honorary Secretary Cross-Stitch, Thesiger was convinced that needlework could improve injured men's morale and earn some money, as he also obtained commissions, including an altar frontal for private use in Buckingham Palace.

At a dinner party shortly after his return, someone asked him what it had been like in France, to which he is supposed to have responded "Oh, my dear, the noise! and the people!"

In 1917, he married Janette Mary Fernie Ranken (1877–1970), sister of his close friend and fellow Slade graduate William Bruce Ellis Ranken. In her biography of Thesiger's friend, Ivy Compton-Burnett, Hilary Spurling suggests that Thesiger and Janette wed largely out of their mutual adoration of William, who shaved his head when he learned of the engagement. Another source states more explicitly that Thesiger made no secret of his bisexuality.

Thesiger moved in several artistic, literary and theatrical circles, and is reported to have spent time with Queen Mary, both doing needlework and commenting on the sexuality of proposed honours nominees. At various times, he frequented the studio of John Singer Sargent, befriended Mrs. Patrick Campbell, visited and corresponded with Percy Grainger and worked closely with George Bernard Shaw, who wrote the role of the Dauphin in Saint Joan for him. Somerset Maugham, on the other hand, responded to Thesiger's inquiry as to why he wrote no parts for him with the quip, "But I am always writing parts for you, Ernest. The trouble is that somebody called Gladys Cooper will insist on playing them." Thesiger was in the cast of Maugham's highly successful 1921 play The Circle, produced at the Haymarket Theatre (also with Fay Compton and Leon Quartermaine).

== Early stage career ==
Thesiger first came to public notice in the farce A Little Bit of Fluff by Walter W. Ellis at the Criterion Theatre in 1915–18. He played the comic hero Bertrand Tully over 1,200 times, and received very favourable reviews. The London Standard wrote, "The character of Bertram Tully...is one of the happiest seen on the stage for a decade past...Mr. Ernest Thesiger achieved a real triumph." He reprised the role in the 1919 film version, and in a 1923 revival at the Ambassadors Theatre.

In 1925, Thesiger appeared in drag in Noël Coward's On with the Dance, and later played the Dauphin in Shaw's Saint Joan. This highlighted his ability to play camp-like roles, which would eventually catch the eye of the similarly camp-leaning James Whale. He wrote an autobiography Practically True, published in 1927, which covers his stage career. An unpublished memoir written near the end of his life is housed in the Ernest Thesiger Collection at the University of Bristol Theatre Collection.

== Film career ==
Thesiger made his film debut in 1916 in The Real Thing at Last, a spoof presenting Macbeth as it might be done by an American company, in which he did a drag turn as one of the Witches. Thesiger also played the First Witch in a 1941 production of Macbeth directed by John Gielgud. He performed more small roles in films during the silent era, but worked mainly on the stage. He had a larger role in an early film for director Alfred Hitchcock, the silent Number 13 (1922), but this was never completed due to lack of funds.

=== Work with James Whale ===
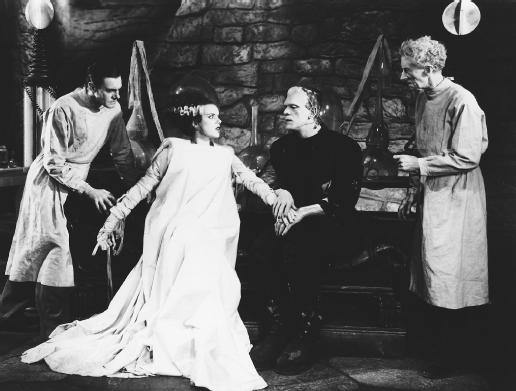
Colin Clive, Elsa Lanchester, Boris Karloff and Thesiger in Bride of Frankenstein (1935)

When he appeared in a Christmas production of The Merry Wives of Windsor in 1919, Thesiger met and befriended James Whale. After Whale moved to Hollywood and had found success with the films Journey's End (1930) and Frankenstein (1931), the director was commissioned to direct the screen adaptation of J. B. Priestley's Benighted as The Old Dark House (1932), starring Charles Laughton in his first American film, together with top-billed Boris Karloff, Melvyn Douglas, Gloria Stuart, Raymond Massey and Lillian Bond. Whale immediately cast Thesiger in the film as Horace Femm, launching his Hollywood career. The following year Thesiger appeared (as a Scottish butler) with Karloff in a British film, The Ghoul.

When Whale agreed to direct Bride of Frankenstein in 1935, he insisted on casting Thesiger as Dr. Septimus Pretorius, instead of the studio's choice of Claude Rains. Partly inspired by Mary Shelley's friend John Polidori and largely based on the Renaissance physician and botanist Paracelsus, it became Thesiger's most famous role.

Arriving in the United States for the filming of Bride of Frankenstein, Thesiger immediately set up a display of all his needlework in his hotel suite, each with a price tag, and during the making of the film he would work on needlework, one of his hobbies.

=== After Bride ===
Originally cast to play the Luddite sculptor Theotocopolous in H. G. Wells's Things to Come (1936), Thesiger's performance was deemed unsuitable by the author, and so was replaced by Cedric Hardwicke, although he was retained on the parallel production of Wells's The Man Who Could Work Miracles. Around this same time Thesiger published a book, Adventures in Embroidery, about needlework, which was his expert hobby.

The remainder of Thesiger's career was centred on the theatrical stage, though he did appear in supporting roles in films, prominent among which is The Man in the White Suit (1951), starring Alec Guinness. He plays "Sir John," the most powerful, the richest, and the oldest of the industrialists (jointly with the trade unions) trying to suppress Guinness's invention of a fabric that never wears out and never gets dirty. He also made a notable appearance in 1953 in the Golden Globe-winning The Robe as the Emperor Tiberius.

Thesiger made several appearances on Broadway, notably as Jacques to Katharine Hepburn's Rosalind in the longest-running production of As You Like It ever produced on Broadway. Later films included The Horse's Mouth (1958) with Alec Guinness, Sons and Lovers (1960), and The Roman Spring of Mrs. Stone, with Vivien Leigh and Warren Beatty (1961). That same year he made his final stage appearance—a mere week before his death—in The Last Joke, with John Gielgud and Ralph Richardson.

== Later life ==
In 1960, Thesiger was appointed a Commander of the Order of the British Empire (CBE). He was Vice Patron of the Embroiderers Guild. His last film appearance was a small role in The Roman Spring of Mrs. Stone (1961). Shortly after completing it, Thesiger died in his sleep from natural causes on the eve of his 82nd birthday. His body was buried in Brompton Cemetery in London.

== Legacy ==
In the fictionalised James Whale biopic Gods and Monsters (1998), Thesiger was portrayed by Arthur Dignam. The real Thesiger is seen in the film when Brendan Fraser, as Whale's gardener, sits at a bar watching a televised showing of the original 1935 Bride of Frankenstein.

== Filmography ==
- The Real Thing at Last (1916) – Witch
- Nelson (1918) – William Pitt, the Younger
- The Life Story of David Lloyd George (1918) – Joseph Chamberlain
- A Little Bit of Fluff (1919) – Bertram Tully
- The Bachelor's Club (1921) – Israfel Mondego
- The Adventures of Mr. Pickwick (1921) – Mr. Jingle
- Number 13 (1922, Unfinished) – Mr. Peabody
- Weekend Wives (1928) – Bertram
- The Vagabond Queen (1929) – Lidoff
- The Old Dark House (1932) – Horace Femm
- The Ghoul (1933) – Laing
- The Only Girl (1933) – The Chamberlain
- My Heart Is Calling (1935) – Fevrier
- Bride of Frankenstein (1935) – Dr. Pretorius
- The Night of the Party (1935) – Chiddiatt
- The Man Who Could Work Miracles (1936) – Maydig
- They Drive by Night (1938) – Walter Hoover
- The Ware Case (1938) – Carter
- Lightning Conductor (1938) – Professor
- My Learned Friend (1943) – Ferris
- The Lamp Still Burns (1943) – Chairman
- Don't Take It to Heart (1944) – Justices' Clerk
- Henry V (1944) – Duke of Berri – French Ambassador.
- A Place of One's Own (1945) – Dr. Marsham
- Caesar and Cleopatra (1945) – Theodotus
- Beware of Pity (1946) – Baron Emil de Kekesfalva
- The Man Within (1947) – Farne
- Jassy (1947) – Sir Edward Follesmark
- The Ghosts of Berkeley Square (1947) – Dr. Cruickshank of Psychical Research Society
- The Winslow Boy (1948) – Mr. Ridgeley Pierce
- Quartet (1948) – Henry Dashwood (segment "The Colonel's Lady")
- Brass Monkey (1948) – Ryder-Harris
- The Bad Lord Byron (1949) – Count Guiccioli
- Last Holiday (1950) – Sir Trevor Lampington
- Laughter in Paradise (1951) – Endicott
- The Man in the White Suit (1951) – Sir John Kierlaw
- Scrooge (1951) – The Undertaker
- The Magic Box (1951) – Earl
- The Woman's Angle (1952) – Judge
- The Robe (1953) – Emperor Tiberius
- Meet Mr Lucifer (1953) – Mr. Macdonald
- The Million Pound Note (1954) – Mr. Garrett, Bank Director (uncredited)
- Father Brown (1954) – Vicomte de Verdigris
- Make Me an Offer (1954) – Sir John
- Value for Money (1955) – Lord Dewsbury
- Quentin Durward (1955) – Lord Crawford
- An Alligator Named Daisy (1955) – Notcher
- Who Done It? (1956) – Sir Walter Finch
- Three Men in a Boat (1956) – 3rd Old Gentleman
- Doctor at Large (1957) – First Examiner
- The Truth About Women (1958) – Judge
- The Horse's Mouth (1958) – Hickson
- The Battle of the Sexes (1959) – Old Macpherson
- Armchair Theatre; Lord Arthur Savile's Crime (TV, 1960, TV Series)
- The Roman Spring of Mrs. Stone (1961) – Stefano (posthumous release; final film role)
