= Ivy Close =

British actress (1890–1968)

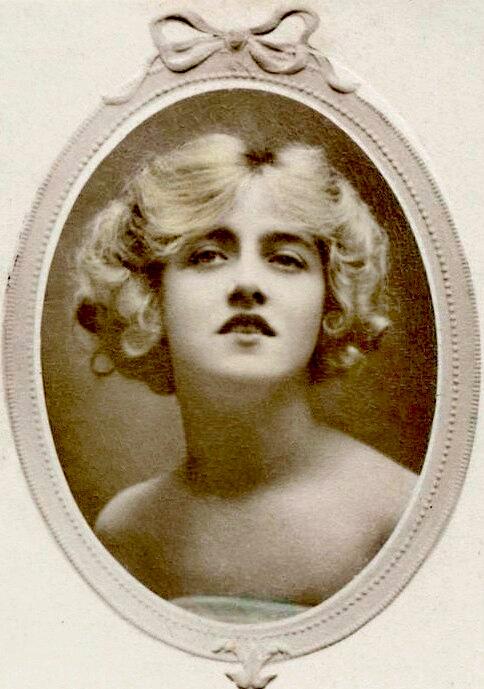
- Born: Ivy Lilian Close; 15 June 1890; Stockton-on-Tees, County Durham, England
- Died: 4 December 1968 (aged 78); Goring, Oxfordshire, England
- Occupation: Actress
- Years active: 1912–1929
- Spouses: Elwin Neame (m. 1910; died 1923) Curly Batson (m. 1938; died 1957)
- Children: 2, including Ronald Neame
- Relatives: Christopher Neame (grandson); Gareth Neame (great-grandson)

Ivy Lilian Close (15 June 1890 – 4 December 1968) was a British actress. She acted in 44 films between 1912 and 1929.

== Life ==
Ivy Lilian Close was born 15 June 1890 in Stockton-on-Tees, County Durham, the daughter of Emma (née Blackburn) and John Robert Close. She had a younger brother, Raymond, and a sister, Dorothy.

Her first husband was photographer and filmmaker Elwin Neame (1885–1923), whom she married in 1910. Together they established Ivy Close Films in 1914, one of the first movie production companies founded by a film star. This marriage produced two sons: the director, cinematographer, producer and screenwriter Ronald Neame, and author and screenwriter Derek Neame (1915–1979). Her grandson, by Ronald, was producer and screenwriter Christopher Neame and her great grandson, by Christopher, is producer Gareth Neame. In 1938 she married Australian stuntman and make-up artist Curly Batson; this marriage lasted until his death in 1957.

In 1908, Ivy Close was named the World's Most Beautiful Woman by the British tabloid Daily Mirror, beating over 1,500 contestants, so becoming generally recognized as Britain's first beauty queen. Her victory won her not only a new Rover motorcar but also the exhibition of a portrait, by Sir Arthur Hacker, at the Royal Academy in London; the portrait was subsequently used on 4 May 1908 to fill the front page of the newspaper which had organised the contest. The painting was subsequently discovered to be in the collection of the Ferens Art Gallery in Hull but not on display because it required restoration; the necessary work was paid for by her great-grandson Gareth Neame. Neame has argued, "And there was then a competition between the winner in Britain and the winner in the US, and she ended up winning that one. So I often say she was effectively the first ever Miss World."

Besides acting, her other pursuits were motorcycling and golf. She also worked as a model in advertising campaigns and sang in English music halls. Close's film career ended with the advent of talkies, as her English accent was deemed unsuitable for American audiences. Her great-grandson incorporated a passing reference to her career in an episode of Downton Abbey.

Ivy Close died 4 December 1968 in Goring, Oxfordshire, aged 78.

== Selected filmography ==
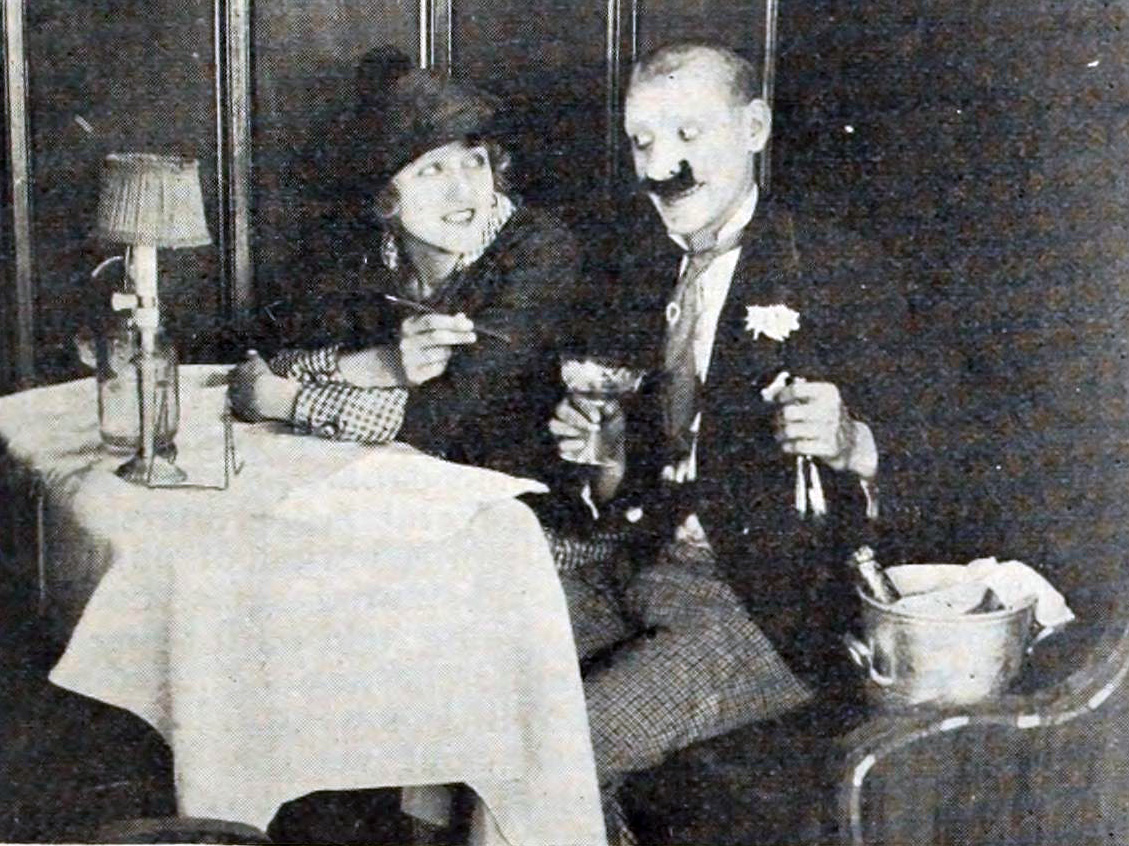
The Girl and the Tenor (1916)

- The Lure of London (1914)
- The Ware Case (1917)
- The House Opposite (1917)
- Nelson (1918)
- Missing the Tide (1918)
- A Peep Behind the Scenes (1918)
- Adam Bede (1918)
- The Irresistible Flapper (1919)
- The Flag Lieutenant (1919)
- Darby and Joan (1920)
- The Worldlings (1920)
- Was She Justified? (1922)
- Expiation (1922)
- La Roue (1923)
- The Merry Farmer (1927)
