= Gareth Neame =

British television producer and executive

Gareth Neame OBE DL
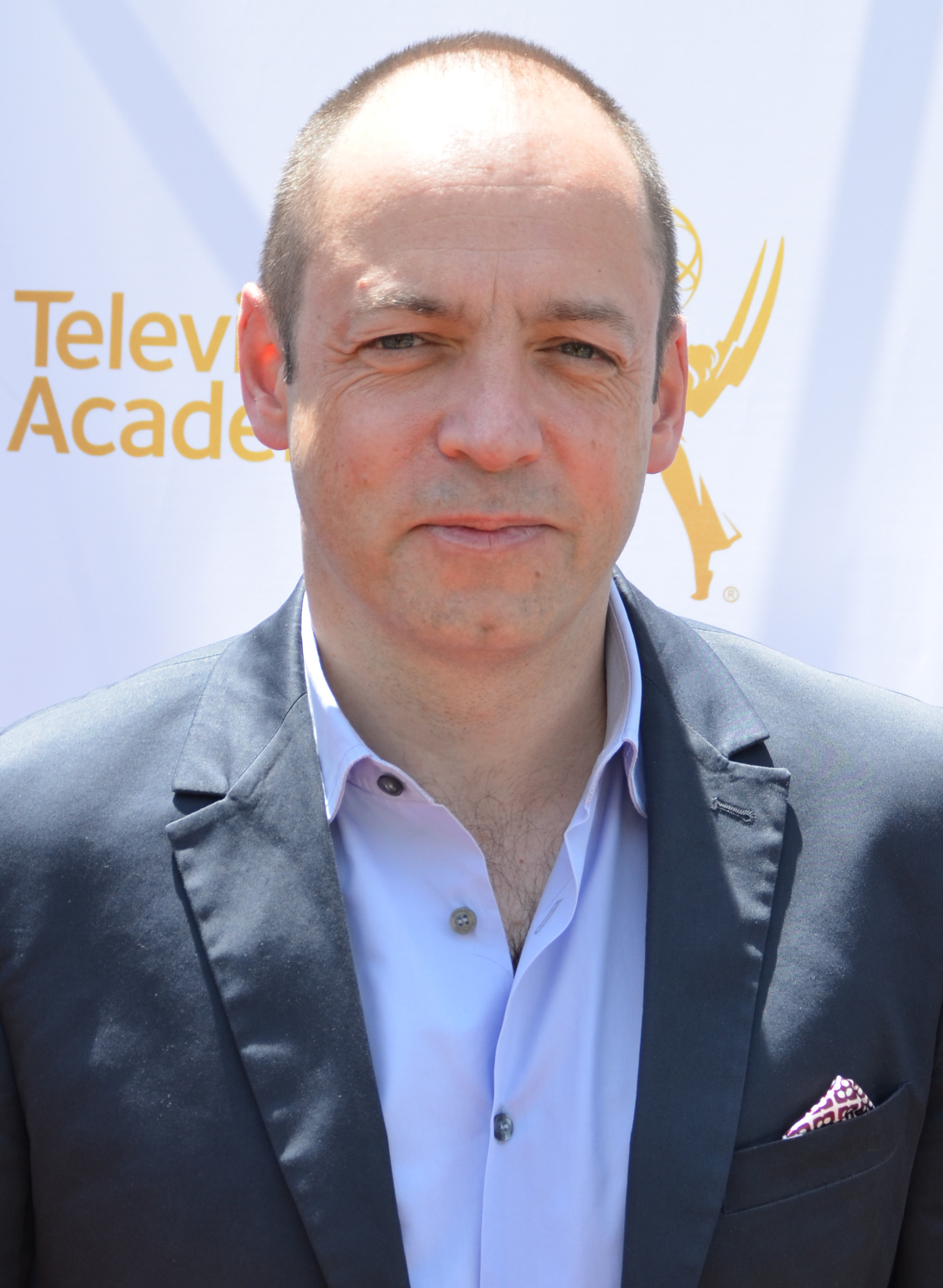
- Neame at an event for Downton Abbey cast and creators, May 2014
- Born: 8 March 1967 (age 58)
- Occupation(s): Television producer and executive

Gareth Elwin Neame OBE DL (born 8 March 1967) is a British television producer and executive. As an executive at the BBC, Neame presided over the development of the dramas Spooks, State of Play, Bodies, Hustle, New Tricks and Tipping the Velvet. He was executive producer of the historical drama series Downton Abbey and originally proposed the idea to its writer and creator Julian Fellowes. He is a recipient of the Emmy, BAFTA and Golden Globe awards.

== Early life ==
Neame is the fourth generation of a family whose involvement in cinema and television spanned the past century. His great-grandparents were the photographer and pioneer filmmaker Elwin Neame (1885–1923) and the film actress Ivy Close. Neame's grandfather was the director, producer, cinematographer and writer Ronald Neame CBE, his great uncle was the author and screenwriter Derek Neame (1915–1979) and his father was the writer and producer Christopher Elwin Neame (1942–2011).

He attended the independent Seaford College in West Sussex. He read English and drama at the University of Birmingham.

== Career ==
Since 2004, he has been CEO of Carnival Films, the British studio which has produced television series such as Poirot, Traffik, Jeeves and Wooster, Hotel Babylon, Whitechapel and Stan Lee's Lucky Man. In 2008, Neame sold the company to NBCUniversal as part of its new international TV studios, producing shows such as The Philanthropist for NBC and the historical drama series Downton Abbey.

Neame executive produced all episodes of the show which has won numerous national and international awards, as well as receiving a Guinness World Record for the highest critical review ratings for a TV show ever. Neame was also honoured by the Producers Guild of America with the David L. Wolper award for outstanding producer of long-form television. The subsequent movie released in September 2019, produced by Neame, was No.1 in the box office in North America and the UK, and is Focus Features' most successful release grossing in excess of $200 million. In August 2015, Neame accepted a BAFTA Special Award in recognition of Downton Abbey's global success, alongside Julian Fellowes and members of the cast. A sequel to the first film, Downton Abbey: A New Era, was released in 2021, with much of the original cast returning. A third and final film, Downton Abbey: The Grand Finale, was released in September 2025.

Other series which Neame has produced at Carnival include Belgravia, Jamestown, and The Hollow Crown, a filmed anthology of Shakespeare's history plays. He has collaborated with Sir David Hare on his Worricker trilogy, and produced both of the BAFTA award-winning series The Lost Honour of Christopher Jefferies and Any Human Heart. Under his leadership, Carnival was recognised as best production company at both the Broadcast Awards and Televisual Bulldog Awards in 2012, and more recently honoured with the 'Impact In Television' award at SeriesFest International TV Festival 2025. Neame also produced five seasons of the popular series The Last Kingdom for Netflix, with a spin-off movie Seven Kings Must Die released in April 2023. Neame's most recent productions include the critically acclaimed and Golden Globe-nominated series The Day of the Jackal starring Eddie Redmayne, Lockerbie: A Search for Truth starring Colin Firth, and All Her Fault starring Sarah Snook. He is also an Executive Producer on HBO's Emmy Award-winning series The Gilded Age.

Neame was named by GQ magazine as one of the 100 most connected men in Britain in March 2014 and in December 2014 was announced by 10 Downing Street as an Ambassador of the GREAT Britain campaign. Neame has also been interviewed as part of the Archive of American Television, and has been listed in the Variety 500 index of most influential business leaders in the global entertainment industry.

== Personal life ==
Neame was appointed Officer of the Order of the British Empire (OBE) in the 2016 Birthday Honours for services to drama. Neame is also a Deputy Lieutenant (DL) of Greater London. He holds an honorary doctorate at the University of Birmingham, where he is Honorary Professor in the Creative Industries.

When Neame discovered that a portrait of his great-grandmother Ivy Close – which had been painted by Sir Arthur Hacker after she won the Daily Mirror's contest to find the World's Most Beautiful Woman, exhibited at the Royal Academy in London, and used to fill the newspaper's front page on 4 May 1908 – was in the collection of the Ferens Art Gallery in Hull but not on display because it required restoration, he paid for the necessary work.

Neame is a Life Patron of The Landmark Trust and through his charitable foundation supports causes including Together for Short Lives, music and drama scholarships, youth organisations, conservation and the arts and veterans. He is a Freeman of The City of London and a Liveryman of The Worshipful Company of Fishmongers.
