= Eversley Cross =

Village in Hampshire, England

Coordinates: 51.349673°N 0.859318°W

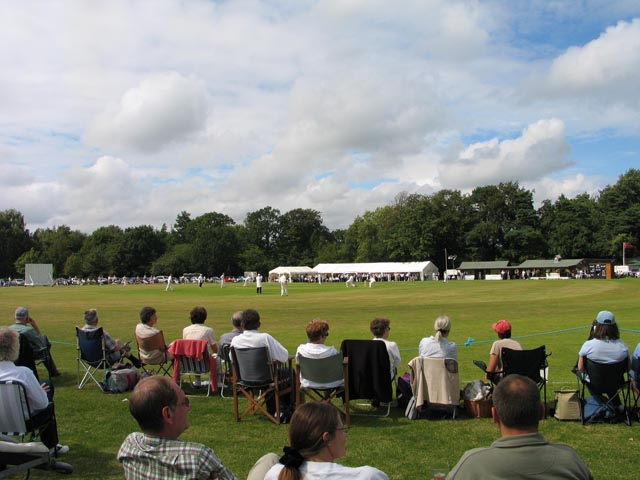
- Eversley Cricket Club

- Location within Hampshire
- OS grid reference: SU7953661794
- District: Hart
- Shire county: Hampshire
- Region: South East
- Country: England
- Sovereign state: United Kingdom
- Post town: Hook
- Postcode district: RG27 0
- Police: Hampshire and Isle of Wight
- Fire: Hampshire and Isle of Wight
- Ambulance: South Central
- UK Parliament: North East Hampshire

Eversley Cross is a village in the eastern corner of the Eversley parish in the Hart District of Hampshire, England. It is in the civil parish of Eversley. The nearest town is Yateley, approximately 2 miles (3.2 km) south east of the village. The village sits at the junction between the B3016 and B3272 roads.

== Sport ==
The village is home to Eversley Cricket Club, which plays in the Thames Valley Cricket League.

== Notable buildings ==
There are several listed buildings in and around Eversley Cross, including the Grade II listed Chequers Inn, part of which dates from the 17th century.
