= Eversley =

Village and parish in Hampshire, England

Coordinates: 51.348145°N 0.875301°W

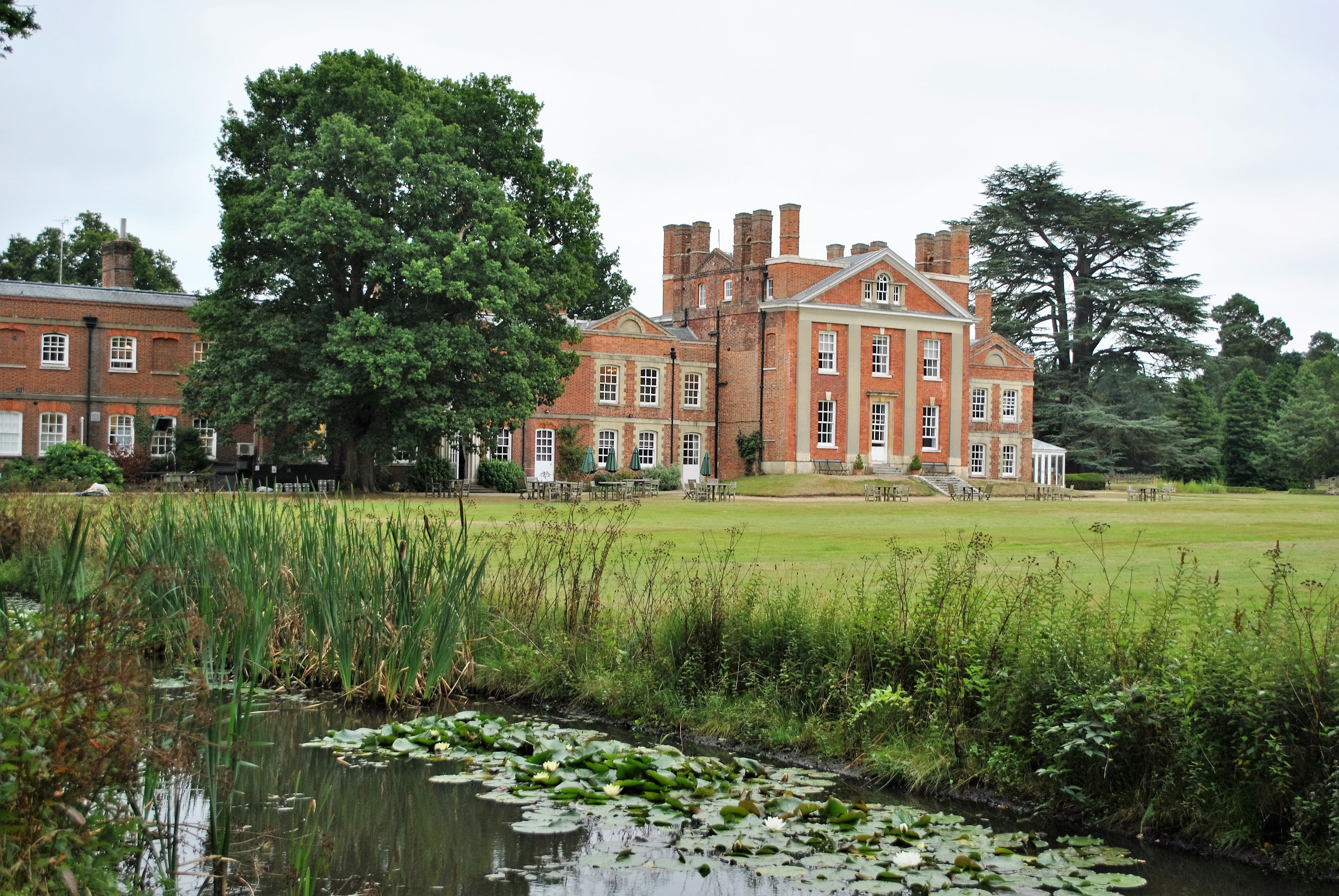
- Warbrook House

- Location within Hampshire
- Population: 1,653 (2011 Census)
- OS grid reference: SU780615
- Civil parish: Eversley
- District: Hart
- Shire county: Hampshire
- Region: South East
- Country: England
- Sovereign state: United Kingdom
- Post town: HOOK
- Postcode district: RG27
- Dialling code: 0118
- Police: Hampshire and Isle of Wight
- Fire: Hampshire and Isle of Wight
- Ambulance: South Central
- UK Parliament: North East Hampshire

Eversley is a village and civil parish in the Hart district of Hampshire, England. The village is located around 11 miles (18 km) northeast of Basingstoke and around 2.5 miles (4 km) west of Yateley. The River Blackwater, and the border with Berkshire, form the northern boundary of the parish.

== Character ==
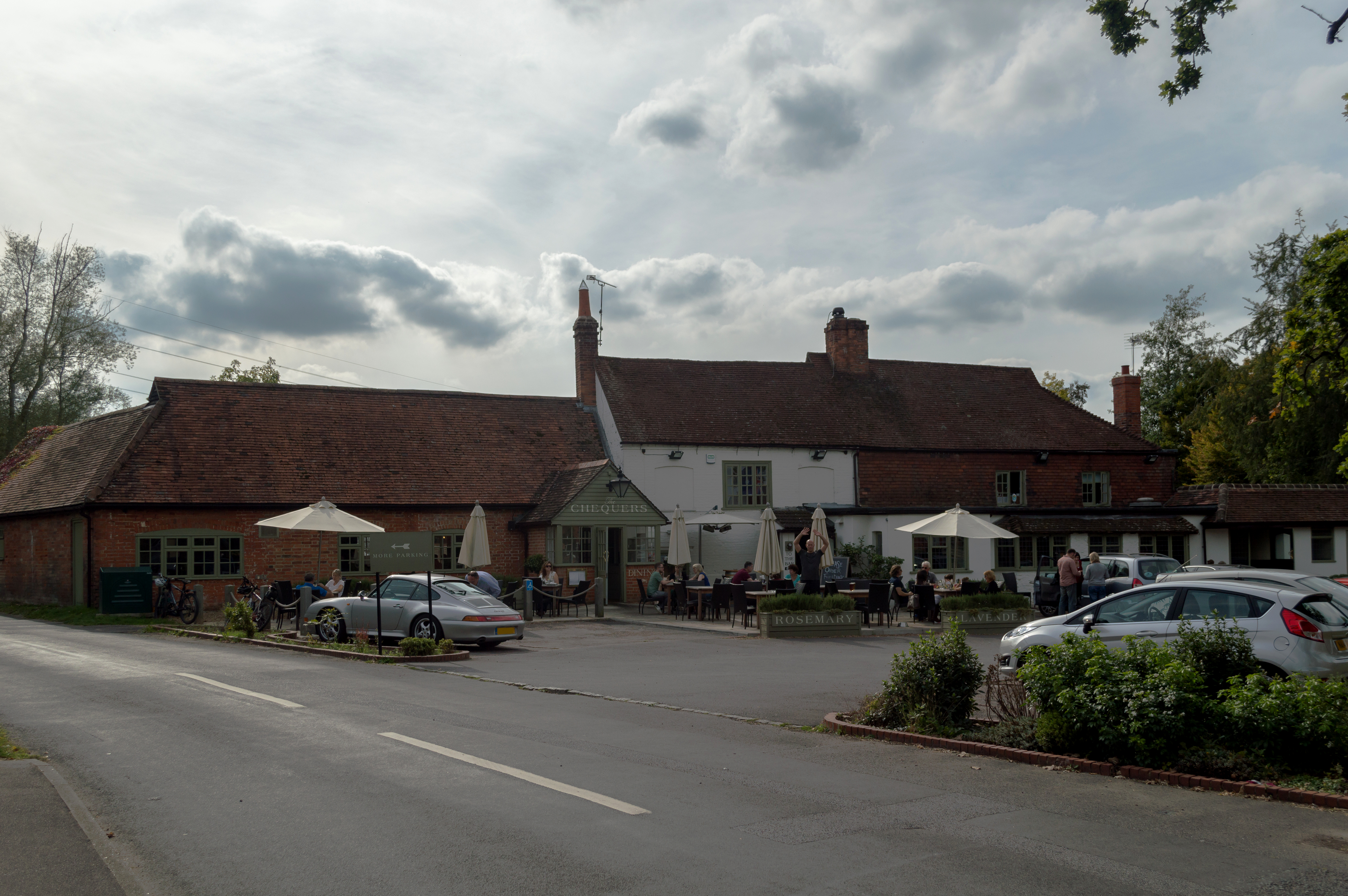
The Chequers is a Grade II listed building and was built in the 17th century with 19th- and 20th-century additions.

Eversley means "Wild Boar Clearing" and the boar is the symbol of the village, as shown on the village sign.

The parish contains a number of hamlets: Eversley Village (sometimes called Eversley Street), Eversley Centre, Eversley Cross, Lower Common and Up Green. The historical parish also included Bramshill, a modern civil parish largely covered by plantation forest, but also including the early 17th century Bramshill House. Eversley Centre and Eversley Cross (to the north of Yateley) are contiguous and constitute the main part of the village, whilst Eversley 'village' lies around 1 mile (1.6 km) to the north on the A327 road towards Arborfield.

There are a number of other large country houses in Eversley: Firgrove Manor (now apartments), Glaston Hill House (private residence) and Warbrook House (now a Conference Centre). Monuments to their residents can be seen in St Mary's Church, a medieval building mostly rebuilt in the 18th century.

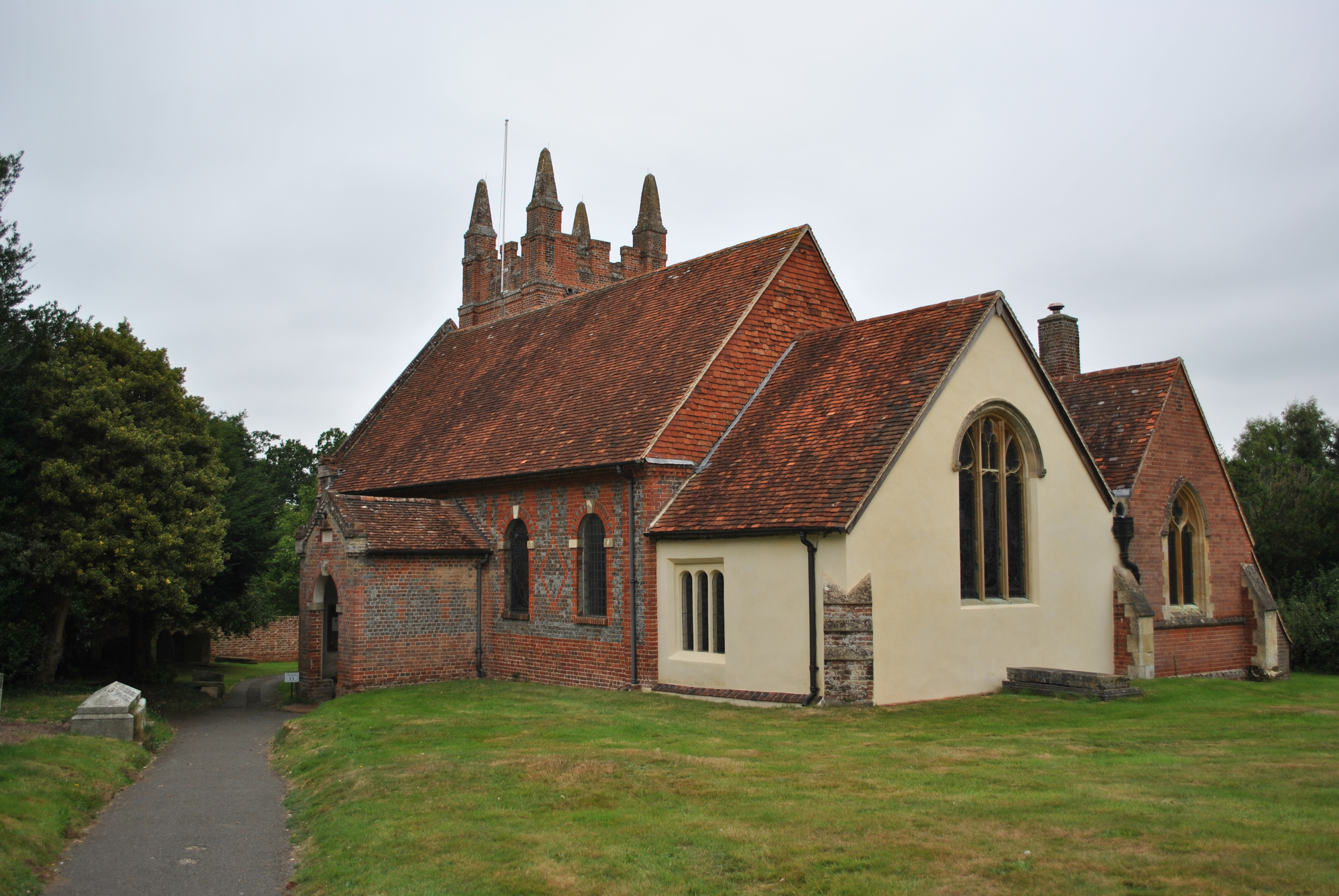
St Mary's Church, Eversley

The churchyard is the burial-place of Charles Kingsley, who for 35 years was rector of the parish. Kingsley was a significant author and commentator in the 19th century: his novels include The Water Babies and Westward Ho!. He was also a social critic and an early founder of modern Christian socialism. One of his poems, "The Bad Squire", is displayed in the church.

== Education ==
=== Charles Kingsley's Primary School ===
In Eversley there is a primary school called Charles Kingsley's Primary School, founded by Charles Kingsley in 1853. In 2011, it was inspected by OFSTED, and graded as "outstanding".

=== St. Neot's Preparatory School ===
The village is home to St. Neots, also an independent preparatory school. It was founded in Sunningdale in 1888 as a proprietorial boys’ preparatory boarding school. It moved to the current site in Eversley in 1894, acquired charitable trust status under a governing board in 1955, opened a co-educational pre-prep in 1988 and attained full co-education in 1990. Since 1997 the school has worked a five-day week, with weekly and flexi-boarding from Year 3. The boarding ceased in 2015. The boar was taken as a symbol of the school, replacing the deer, to link it with the meaning of the name of the village Eversley.

== Modern notoriety ==
On 1 April 1992, Jacqueline Palmer-Radford, a 40-year-old mother of two, was found dead after having been raped and strangled at her home in the village. The murder remains unsolved despite being featured on the television programme Crimewatch.

== Notable people ==
- Andrew Strauss, former England cricket captain lives in Eversley.
- British folk-singer Laura Marling grew up in Eversley.
- Will Carling, former England rugby captain, used to live in Eversley.
- Clergyman and novelist, Charles Kingsley, author of Westward Ho! and The Water Babies, lived in Eversley.
- Journalist and TV presenter, Mary Nightingale, was an Eversley resident.
- Former footballer and Southampton manager, Nigel Adkins, grew up in Eversley.

== Sport ==
Eversley F.C. was founded in 1910. They became the first winners of the Surrey Elite Intermediate League in 2009 and gained promotion to Division One of the Combined Counties League for the 2009–10 season.
