= Number 13 (1922 film) =

1922 film by Alfred Hitchcock

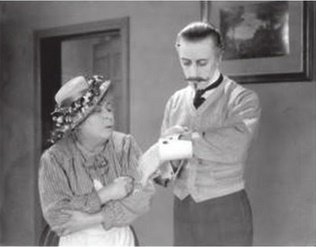
- Film still
- Directed by: Alfred Hitchcock
- Written by: Anita Ross
- Produced by: Alfred Hitchcock
- Starring: Clare Greet; Ernest Thesiger
- Production company: Gainsborough Pictures
- Country: United Kingdom
- Languages: Silent film English intertitles

In 1922, Alfred Hitchcock obtained his first shot at directing for Gainsborough Pictures with the film Number 13 (or Mrs. Peabody) but due to financial difficulties, it was never completed.

Clare Greet and Ernest Thesiger were to star as husband and wife. The story was about low-income residents of a building, financed by The Peabody Trust, founded by American banker-philanthropist George Foster Peabody, to offer affordable housing to needy Londoners.

However, the film's budget fell apart, and it was pulled from production after only a handful of scenes were shot. Hitchcock rarely, if ever, spoke about his first directing project, until his biographer, Donald Spoto, asked him about life in the early twenties, and his first films. On one occasion, he said that it was a "somewhat chastening experience".

All fragments of the film have been lost. As with Hitchcock's later lost films The Mountain Eagle and An Elastic Affair, footage from Number 13 has become widely sought after by film historians and collectors without success.

== Production ==
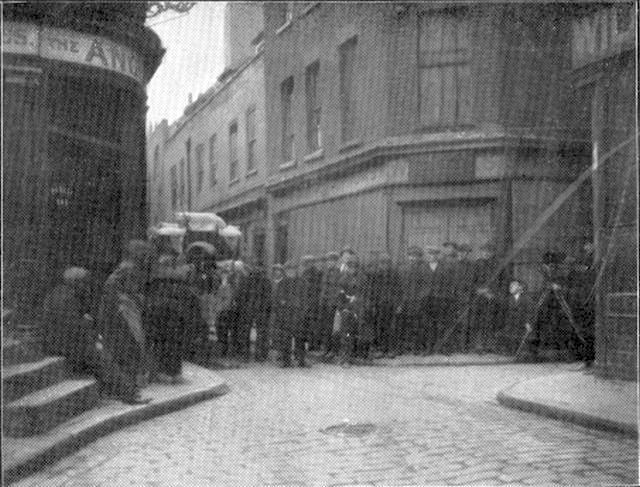
Hitchcock filming Number 13 in Rotherhithe, London.

Number 13 was written by Anita Ross, a woman employed at the Islington studio. She claimed to have a professional association with Charlie Chaplin, according to Hitchcock, in his book-length interview with François Truffaut, Hitchcock/Truffaut (Simon and Schuster, 1967).

Clare Greet was obliged to finance the production with her own money; before her, Alfred Hitchcock's uncle John Hitchcock had also provided funds. Greet's generosity was something the director never forgot, and she appeared in more Hitchcock films than any other performer (other than Leo G. Carroll, who also appeared in six Hitchcock films): The Ring (1927), The Manxman (1929), Murder! (1930), The Man Who Knew Too Much (1934), Sabotage (1936), and Jamaica Inn (1939).

== See also ==
- List of lost films

== Sources ==
- Donald Spoto, The Life of Alfred Hitchcock: The Dark Side of Genius (HarperCollins Publishers, 1983) ISBN 0-00-216352-7
- Patrick McGilligan, Alfred Hitchcock: A Life in Darkness and Light (Wiley and Sons, 2003) ISBN 0-470-86973-9
