= Christopher Neame (writer/producer) =

British film producer and screenwriter (1942–2011)

Christopher Elwin Neame (24 December 1942 – 12 June 2011) was a British film producer and screenwriter.

== Personal life ==
He was born in Windsor, Berkshire and educated at St. Wilfrid's School, Seaford and the King's School, Canterbury. He was the son of film director Ronald Neame and of Beryl Heanly and the grandson of Ivy Close. Neame lived in the south of France with his third wife Sally-Ann.

Neame was the third of four generations of the Neame family in the film business. His son Gareth also works in the media industry, and after spending many years at the BBC now works as the Managing Director of Carnival Films. He also had two daughters Emma (who is married to the artist Andrew Litten) and Shuna.

He was married three times:

- Heather Wade 1966; 2d,1s
- Caroline Langley 1974
- Sally-Ann Dowse 1991-2011

He died from an aneurysm aged 68.

== Career ==
Neame's credits as a producer include a number of UK films and television series, such as Emily (1976), Danger UXB, The Knowledge (BAFTA nominated), The Flame Trees of Thika, The Irish R.M. and Soldier, Soldier. His screenplay credits include Graham Greene’s Monsignor Quixote, which he also produced, and which received Christopher Award and BAFTA nominations. He later adapted Monsignor Quixote for the stage. He also wrote the screenplay of H.E. Bates’s Feast of July.

In 2003 his memoir, Rungs On a Ladder, about his years with Hammer Films, was published. In 2004, he continued his life story in A Take on British TV Drama - Stories from the Golden Age and the following year, Principal Characters completed the trilogy.

Courtenay, the stage musical, for which he wrote the book and lyrics was premièred in Britain in 2003. He co-wrote the book and lyrics for the opéra bouffe Lyssi, which was recorded for CD in 2006.
