= Robert Ranken =

Scottish cricketer

Personal information
- Full name: Robert Burt Ranken
- Born: 24 February 1840; Edinburgh, Midlothian, Scotland
- Died: 4 August 1902 (aged 62); Dumfries, Dumfriesshire, Scotland
- Batting: Unknown
- Bowling: Unknown

Domestic team information
- Years: Team
- 1860–1861: Oxford University

Career statistics
Competition	First-class
Matches	4
Runs scored	63
Batting average	12.60
100s/50s	–/–
Top score	20
Balls bowled	65
Wickets	7
Bowling average	14.00
5 wickets in innings	–
10 wickets in match	–
Best bowling	4/?
Catches/stumpings	2/–
- Source: Cricinfo, 23 June 2019

Robert Burt Ranken (24 February 1840 – 4 August 1902) was a Scottish first-class cricketer.

The son of Thomas Ranken, he was born at Edinburgh in October 1840. He was educated in the city at the Edinburgh Academy, before going up to the University of Glasgow. While at Glasgow he was a recipient of the Snell Exhibition scholarship, allowing him to undertake postgraduate studies at Balliol College, Oxford. While studying at Oxford he made his debut in first-class cricket for the Gentlemen of England against the Gentlemen of Kent at Lord's in 1859. He played three first-class matches for Oxford University in 1860–61. Across his four first-class matches, Ranken scored 63 runs and took 7 wickets. After graduating he became a successful and wealthy lawyer, marrying Mary Witherington Dunlop. The couple had four children, two sons and two daughters. One of their sons, William Bruce Ellis Ranken, was a noted artist, while one of their daughters, Janette Ranken Thesiger, was a famous actress. Ranken died at Dumfries in August 1902.
