= Augustus Stapleton =

English biographer and political pamphleteer

Augustus Granville Stapleton (1800–1880) was an English biographer and political pamphleteer.

== Biography ==
Stapleton was educated at Rugby School and Trinity Hall, Cambridge. After graduating he became private secretary to the Foreign Secretary, George Canning, and remained with him until Canning became Prime Minister in 1827. Canning died a few months later and Stapleton subsequently published an extensive biography.

== Publications ==
- The Political Life of the Right Honourable George Canning, 2 volumes, Longman, London, 1831 (second edition, 3 volumes, 1831)
- George Canning and His Times, John W. Parker & Son, London, 1859

and many pamphlets and contributions to newspapers
