= The Ware Case (1917 film) =

1917 film by Walter West

The Ware Case is a 1917 British silent drama film directed by Walter West and starring Matheson Lang, Violet Hopson and Ivy Close. It is an adaptation of the play The Ware Case by George Pleydell Bancroft, filmed again in 1928 and in 1938.

== Cast ==
- Matheson Lang - Sir Hubert Ware
- Violet Hopson - Lady Magdalene Ware
- Ivy Close - Marian Scales
- Gregory Scott - Michael Ayde
- George Foley - Sir Henry Egerton
