= The Ware Case (1928 film) =

1928 film

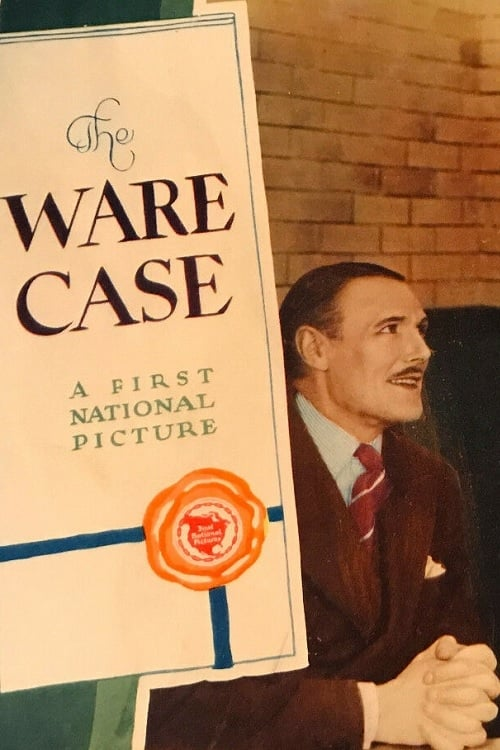
- Directed by: H. Manning Haynes
- Written by: Lydia Hayward
- Based on: The Ware Case by George Pleydell Bancroft
- Produced by: James B. Sloan
- Starring: Stewart Rome; Betty Carter; Ian Fleming; Cameron Carr
- Cinematography: William Shenton
- Production companies: British First National; The Vitaphone Corp.
- Distributed by: First National (UK); Warner Bros. Pictures (US)
- Release date: 3 May 1928
- Running time: 72 minutes
- Country: United Kingdom
- Languages: Silent; English intertitles

The Ware Case is a 1928 British silent drama film directed by H. Manning Haynes and starring Stewart Rome, Betty Carter and Ian Fleming. The film was shot by British First National at the Twickenham Studios in London with sets designed by the art director Hugh Gee. The rights for the film were acquired by the parent American company First National Pictures for copyright and distribution of the film in the United States. This explains why the film at this late date was completely silent as by this time First National was routinely supplying Synchronized musical soundtracks to its feature films. It was an adaptation of the play The Ware Case by George Pleydell Bancroft, previously filmed in 1917, with another version appearing in 1938. First National (through Warner Bros. Pictures) distributed the film in the United States.

== Plot ==
Sir Hubert Ware is athletic, charming, and popular in high society. But beneath his polished exterior lies a man who lives far beyond his means. Perpetually in debt, Sir Hubert hides his moral indifference behind good manners. Among his few acts of kindness is his continued financial help to Tommy Bold, an aging racing tout who has fallen on hard times.

Residing at the grand Ware estate is Lady Magda Ware, Hubert's wife, and her younger brother Eustace Ede, a wealthy and somewhat impressionable young man who has inherited the entirety of their father's fortune. Tensions rise between brother and sister, and following a bitter quarrel during a weekend house party, Eustace storms off to the lake for a swim.

Among the assembled guests is Sir Michael Adye, a celebrated barrister who harbors deep and unspoken affection for Lady Ware. Before long, the gardener bursts in with terrible news: Eustace has been found drowned.

Lady Ware discovers a cryptic note from her brother and, wracked with guilt, assumes he has taken his own life. But the coroner's inquest delivers a shocking twist—bruise marks have been found on Eustace's throat, indicating foul play. A verdict of murder by person or persons unknown is returned.

Public speculation is rampant. Some insist it was a tragic accident; others, suspecting financial motive, turn their eyes to Lady Ware. But chief among the skeptics is Inspector Watkins, who quietly builds a case against Sir Hubert. Suspicion becomes indictment. Weeks later, Sir Hubert Ware is arrested and formally charged with the murder of Eustace Ede.

Despite her emotional turmoil, Lady Ware pleads with Sir Michael Adye to defend her husband. Bound by honor and lingering affection, Sir Michael reluctantly agrees, and the trial commences at the Old Bailey.

The prosecution delivers a strong case, and it appears all hope is lost for the defendant. Then, in a dramatic turn, Tommy Bold—just released from prison—arrives at the courtroom seeking Sir Michael. Bold's testimony, based on details that suggest Eustace's death was likely accidental, undermines the prosecution's timeline. The jury, swayed by doubt, returns a verdict of Not Guilty.

The household returns home, but the tension lingers. Sir Hubert, intoxicated and elated by his narrow escape, begins to unravel. In a drunken haze, he boasts that he did in fact murder Eustace—provoked by financial desperation and personal hatred. Lady Ware and Sir Michael, stunned, realize the court has freed a guilty man.

Outside, a crowd gathers to cheer the triumphant baronet. Sir Hubert climbs to the rooftop parapet to soak in their acclaim. As he listens to their applause, he sways... and plunges from the rooftop to his death.

In the aftermath, Sir Michael Adye stands by Lady Magda's side. Though grief-stricken, she finds solace in his quiet strength. It is gently implied that in time, the bond between them may evolve into a new beginning.

== Cast ==
- Stewart Rome as Sir Hubert Ware
- Betty Carter as Lady Magda Ware
- Ian Fleming as Michael Adye
- Cameron Carr as Inspector Watkins
- Cynthia Murtagh as Celia Gurney
- Patrick Ludlow as Eustace Ede
- Wellington Briggs as Sir Henry Egerton
- Patrick Stewart as Marston Gurney
- Syd Ellery as Tommy Bold
- John Valentine as Attorney General

== Bibliography ==
- Low, Rachael. History of the British Film, 1918-1929. George Allen & Unwin, 1971.
- Wood, Linda. British Films, 1927-1939. British Film Institute, 1986.
