= Expiation (film) =

1922 film

- Directed by: Sinclair Hill
- Written by: E. Phillips Oppenheim (novel); Sinclair Hill
- Starring: Ivy Close; Fred Raynham; Lionelle Howard
- Production company: Stoll Pictures
- Distributed by: Stoll Pictures
- Release date: October 1922
- Country: United Kingdom
- Languages: Silent; English intertitles

Expiation is a 1922 British silent crime film directed by Sinclair Hill and starring Ivy Close, Fred Raynham and Lionelle Howard. It was based on an 1887 novel by E. Phillips Oppenheim. The film was made by Stoll Pictures at the Cricklewood Studios.

== Cast ==
- Ivy Close as Eva Mornington
- Fred Raynham as Cecil Braithwaite
- Lionelle Howard as Godfrey Mornington
- Malcolm Tod as Lord Dereham
- Daisy Campbell as Mrs. Langton
- Fred Rains as Mr. Woodruffe

== Bibliography ==
- Low, Rachael. History of the British Film, 1918-1929. George Allen & Unwin, 1971.
