= Paul Capon =

British author (1912–1969)

Harry Paul Capon (18 December 1912, in Kenton, Suffolk – 24 November 1969) was a British author who wrote fiction in various genres. He also worked as an editor in three films for Maurice Elvey (1887–1967), co-directed Radio Lover (1936), worked as an administrator in film and TV productions and was the head of the Film Department of Independent Television News (1963–1967). He began writing science fiction in the early 1950s with the Antigeos trilogy, dealing with the discovery of a Counter-Earth, usually hidden behind the Sun. He also wrote about utopias, time travel, lost civilizations, alien invasion and Martians.

== Series ==
The Other Side Trilogy

1. The Other Side of the Sun (1950)
2. The Other Half of the Planet (1952)
3. Down to Earth (1954)

== Novels ==
- Battered Caravanserai (1942)
- Brother Cain (1945)
- Hosts of Midian (1946)
- Dead Man's Chest (1947)
- The Murder of Jacob Canansay (1947)
- Fanfare for Shadows (1947)
- O Clouds Unfold (1948)
- Image of a Murder (1949)
- Toby Scuffel (1949)
- Threescore Years (1950)
- Delay of Doom (1950)
- No Time for Death (1951)
- Death at Shinglestrand (aka Murder at Shinglestrand) (1951)
- Death on a Wet Sunday (1952)
- In All Simplicity (1953)
- The World at Bay (1953)
- The Seventh Passenger (1953)
- Malice Domestic (1954)
- Phobos, the Robot Planet (aka Lost: A Moon) (1955)
- Thirty Days Hath September (1955)
- The Wanderbolt (1955)
- Margin of Terror (1955)
- Into the Tenth Millennium (1956)
- The Cave of Cornelius (aka The End of the Tunnel) (1959)
- Flight of Time (1960)
- Warriors' Moon (1960)
- The Kingdom of the Bulls (1961)
- Amongst Those Missing (1959)
- Lord of the Chariots (1962)
- The Golden Cloak (1962)
- Strangers on Forlorn (1969)
- Roman Gold (1968)
- The Final Refuge (1969)

== Non-fiction ==
- The Great Yarmouth Mystery (1965)

== Selected filmography ==
- Road House (1934)
- The Clairvoyant (1935)
- Play Up the Band (1935)
- Heat Wave (1935)
- Radio Lover (1936) – co-director
- The Trojan Brothers (1946)
