= The Prisoner of Zenda =

1894 adventure novel by Anthony Hope

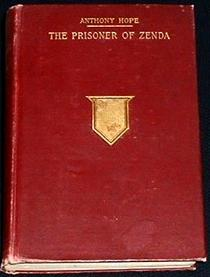
- Cover to 2nd edition
- Author: Anthony Hope
- Language: English
- Genre: Adventure fiction Ruritanian romance
- Publisher: J. W. Arrowsmith
- Publication date: 1894
- Publication place: United Kingdom
- Media type: Print (hardback & paperback)
- Pages: 310 (first edition)
- OCLC: 41674245
- Dewey Decimal: 823/.8 21
- LC Class: PR4762.P7 1999
- Preceded by: The Heart of Princess Osra
- Followed by: Rupert of Hentzau
- Text: The Prisoner of Zenda at Wikisource

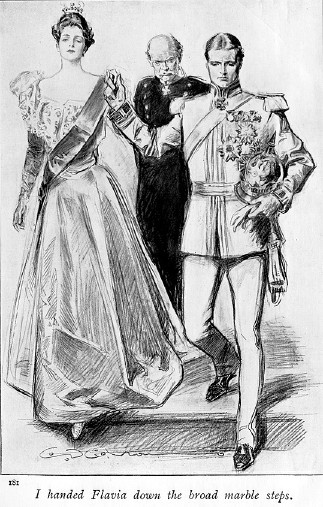
Frontispiece to the 1898 Macmillan Publishers edition, illustrated by Charles Dana Gibson

The Prisoner of Zenda is an 1894 adventure fiction novel by Anthony Hope, in which the King of Ruritania is drugged on the eve of his coronation and thus is unable to attend the ceremony. Political forces within the realm are such that, in order for the king to retain the crown, his coronation must proceed. Fortuitously, an English gentleman on holiday in Ruritania who resembles the monarch is persuaded to act as his political decoy in an effort to save the unstable political situation of the interregnum.

A sequel, Rupert of Hentzau, was published in 1898 and is included in some editions of The Prisoner of Zenda. The popularity of the novels inspired the Ruritanian romance genre of literature, film, and theatre that features stories set in a fictional country, usually in Central or Eastern Europe, for example Graustark from the novels of George Barr McCutcheon, and the neighbouring countries of Syldavia and Borduria in the Tintin comics.

== Synopsis ==
On the eve of the coronation of Rudolf V of Ruritania, he encounters his distant relative, English nobleman Rudolf Rassendyll, come to witness the festivities. The two men look very much alike. The future king and his loyal attendants, Colonel Sapt and Fritz von Tarlenheim, wine and dine their new acquaintance at a hunting lodge. However, Rudolf V's younger half-brother Michael, Duke of Strelsau, sees to it he is presented a bottle of drugged wine. His friends cannot rouse him the next morning.

Not showing up for the coronation would prove disastrous, but Sapt believes that fate has sent Rassendyll to Ruritania. He persuades the Englishman to impersonate the King. They hide the King in the cellar of the lodge and proceed to the capital. The ceremony goes off without a hitch. However, when they go to retrieve the real King Rudolf, they find that he has been abducted.

Rassendyll must continue his deception, but at least Duke Michael cannot unmask him without incriminating himself. While Sapt searches for the King, Rassendyll becomes acquainted with the beautiful Princess Flavia, who is beloved by the people. He learns that everyone expects them to wed. Despite himself, he falls in love with her, and she with him.

Help comes from an unexpected source. Antoinette de Mauban, Michael's mistress, does not want to lose him to Flavia. She confirms that the King is being held in the castle at Zenda. Rassendyll, Sapt, von Tarlenheim and ten picked men go "hunting" nearby. An attempt is made on Rassendyll's life by three of the Six, Duke Michael's most trusted henchmen. When that fails, Rupert Hentzau, one of the Six, visits Rassendyll to present Michael's offer of a million crowns to leave the country. When Rassendyll turns him down, Rupert flees after trying to kill him with a dagger. Rassendyll is only wounded in the shoulder.

They take captive Johann, a servant working at the castle, and bribe him into telling all he knows. At the first sign of an assault, King Rudolf is to be killed, and his corpse dropped secretly into the water. Michael would be no worse off than before, as Rassendyll could hardly accuse him of regicide.

A few days pass. Rassendyll swims the moat at night to reconnoitre. He kills a sentry in a boat. He hears King Rudolf talking to one of his captors, then returns to his friends. However, they are discovered by three of the Six. Two of the Six are killed, at the cost of three of Sapt's men, but Hentzau reaches the safety of the castle.

Later, they encounter Hentzau again, this time accompanying the body of his friend, one of the Six killed earlier. Hentzau privately makes another proposal: Have Sapt and von Tarlenheim lead an assault on the castle. With them and Duke Michael all dead (with Hentzau's assistance), the two of them would have all the spoils to themselves. Hentzau reveals a contributing motive; he is attracted to Antoinette de Mauban. Rassendyll turns him down.

More information is extracted from Johann, including the alarming news that King Rudolf is very ill: ill enough for Duke Michael to send for a doctor. Rassendyll offers Johann another large bribe to open the front door at two in the morning. Rassendyll enters the castle by stealth before then, then watches as Hentzau, caught trying to force himself on Antoinette, stabs the outraged Michael. Then, outnumbered by Michael's men, he dives into the moat. Rassendyll kills one of the Six and takes the key to the cell holding King Rudolf. The King is guarded by Detchard and Bersonin. Rassendyll slays Bersonin, but Detchard hurries to murder the King. The doctor sacrifices himself, grappling with Detchard before being murdered, giving Rassendyll time to catch up to and kill Detchard, with the King's assistance.

Hentzau appears at the drawbridge, defying Michael's men, and challenges Michael to fight him for Antoinette. However Antoinette cries out that Duke Michael is dead. Rassendyll has obtained a pistol, but cannot bring himself to shoot Hentzau. Antoinette has no such qualms, but she misses, and her target leaps into the moat. Then Rassendyll hears Sapt's voice and realizes that reinforcements have arrived. With King Rudolf no longer needing his protection, Rassendyll pursues Hentzau. Hentzau allows him to catch up. Before their duel can reach a conclusion, however, von Tarlenheim arrives, and Hentzau races away on horseback.

When Princess Flavia learns, by accident, about Rudolf Rassendyll, she faints. King Rudolf is restored to his throne, but the lovers are trapped by duty and honour, and must part.

== Adaptations ==
The novel has been adapted many times, mainly for film but also stage, musical, operetta, radio, and television. Probably the best-known version is the 1937 Hollywood film. The charismatic but Machiavellian Rupert of Hentzau has been interpreted by Ramon Novarro (1922), Douglas Fairbanks Jr. (1937), and James Mason (1952).

=== Stage ===
- The Prisoner of Zenda (1895–96) was the first adaptation, a stage play by Edward Rose. It opened in New York in 1895 starring E.H. Sothern and the next year in the West End in London starring George Alexander and Evelyn Millard.
- Princess Flavia (1925), an operetta with the score by Sigmund Romberg.
- Zenda (1963), a musical that closed on the road prior to a scheduled opening on Broadway. Adapted from the 1925 Princess Flavia.

=== Film ===
- The Prisoner of Zenda (1913): Starring James K. Hackett, Beatrice Beckley, David Torrence, Fraser Coalter, William R. Randall and Walter Hale. Adapted by Hugh Ford and directed by Ford and Edwin S. Porter, it was produced by Adolph Zukor and was the first production of the Famous Players Film Company.
- The Prisoner of Zenda (1915): Starring Henry Ainley, Gerald Ames, George Bellamy, Marie Anita Bozzi, Jane Gail, Arthur Holmes-Gore, Charles Rock and Norman Yates. It was adapted by W. Courtney Rowden and directed by George Loane Tucker.
- The Prisoner of Zenda (1922): Starring Ramón Novarro, Lewis Stone, Alice Terry, Robert Edeson, Stuart Holmes, Malcolm McGregor and Barbara La Marr. It was adapted by Mary O'Hara and directed by Rex Ingram.
- The Prisoner of Zenda (1937): Starring Ronald Colman as Rassendyll and Rudolph, Madeleine Carroll as Princess Flavia, Raymond Massey as Michael, Douglas Fairbanks Jr. as Rupert of Hentzau, C. Aubrey Smith as Colonel Zapt and David Niven as Captain Fritz von Tarlenheim. David O. Selznick decided to produce the film, partly as a comment on the Edward VIII abdication crisis, and it was directed by John Cromwell. Of the many film adaptations, this is considered by many to be the definitive version. Leslie Halliwell puts it at No. 590 of all the films ever made, saying that the "splendid schoolboy adventure story" of the late Victorian novel is "perfectly transferred to the screen", and quotes a 1971 comment by John Cutts that the film becomes more "fascinating and beguiling" as time goes by. Halliwell's Film Guide 2008 calls it "one of the most entertaining films to come out of Hollywood".
- The Prisoner of Zenda (1952): Starring Stewart Granger, Deborah Kerr, Louis Calhern, Jane Greer, Lewis Stone, Robert Douglas, James Mason and Robert Coote. Stone, who played the lead in the 1922 version, had a minor role in this remake. It was adapted by Edward Rose, (dramatisation) Wells Root, John L. Balderston, Noel Langley and Donald Ogden Stewart (additional dialogue, originally uncredited). It was directed by Richard Thorpe. It is a shot-for-shot copy of the 1937 film, the only difference being that it was made in Technicolor. Halliwell judges it "no match for the happy inspiration of the original".
- The Great Race (1965): Starring Tony Curtis, Jack Lemmon, and Natalie Wood. Directed by Blake Edwards, this adventure farce based on the 1908 New York to Paris Race features an extended parody of The Prisoner of Zenda in its third act. The evil Professor Fate (Lemmon) strongly resembles the dissipated Crown Prince Hapnick (also Lemmon) of an eastern European kingdom. An attempted coup led by Baron von Stuppe (Ross Martin) and General Kuhster (George Macready) loosely follows the structure of The Prisoner of Zenda, including the kidnapping of Hapnick and others. Curtis' white-clad hero is forced to rescue them and duel von Stuppe while Fate impersonates the missing king. The climax of the segment is a massive pie fight involving all the characters.
- The Prisoner of Zenda (1979): A comic version, starring Peter Sellers, Lynne Frederick, Lionel Jeffries, Elke Sommer, Gregory Sierra, Jeremy Kemp, Catherine Schell, Simon Williams and Stuart Wilson. It was adapted by Dick Clement and Ian La Frenais and directed by Richard Quine. In this version, Sellers plays the King, his father, and the other main character Syd Frewin, a London Hansom Cab driver, who finds himself employed as a double to the King and eventually changes places with him permanently.
- The Prisoner of Zenda (1988), an Australian animated version for children, starring Robert Coleby, Claire Crowther, David Whitney, Franc Violi, and Walter Sullivan, with a screenplay by Leonard Lee, produced by Burbank Animation Studios.

==== International ====
- Nadodi Mannan (1958): A Tamil film starring M. G. Ramachandran.
- Jhinder Bandi (ঝিন্দের বন্দী-'The Prisoner of Jhind') is a Bengali adaptation (in Indian/Bengali context) by Sharadindu Bandyopadhyay. The author wrote 'I admit the source by its name' (নাম দিয়াই বংশপরিচয় স্বীকার করিলাম) meaning, he named the fictional province, Jhind in tribute to Zenda in the original novel.
- Jhinder Bandi (1961): a Bengali film directed by Tapan Sinha, starring Uttam Kumar as the protagonist Gourishankar Roy (a youth from Kolkata) and the king Shankar Singh of the fictional Jhind state, Soumitra Chatterjee as the antagonist Moyur-Bahon with Tarun Kumar as Gourishankar's brother Udit, based on the novel by Saradindu Bandyopadhyay of the same title.
- Kiladi Ranga (1966): A Kannada film starring Dr. Rajkumar.
- Prem Ratan Dhan Payo (2015) is a Bollywood film starring Salman Khan and Sonam Kapoor that follows a similar plot. However, in this adaption, Rassendyll is married to Princess Flavia in the end.
- Gwange Wangyidoen namja, also known as Masquerade, is a 2012 Korean movie taking place during the Joseon dynasty that largely parallels the story in Prisoner of Zenda, but may be based on conjecture about a historical person, king Gwanghaegun of Joseon, and a 15-day period where records are missing from the annals of the Joseon Dynasty.

=== Radio and TV ===
- Colman, Smith and Fairbanks reprised their roles for a 1939 episode of Lux Radio Theatre, with Colman's wife Benita Hume playing Princess Flavia.
- The Prisoner of Zenda (1961) U.S. television adaptation (DuPont Show of the Month), starring Christopher Plummer and Inger Stevens.
- The Prisoner of Zenda (1973) BBC Radio adaptation starring Julian Glover as Rassendyll/King Rudolf and Hannah Gordon as Princess Flavia.
- Carry On Laughing (1974) Spoof adaptation 'The Prisoner of Spenda' starring Sidney James, Barbara Windsor
- The Prisoner of Zenda (1984) BBC television adaptation starring Malcolm Sinclair.
- The Prisoner of Zenda (1992) BBC Radio adaptation starring Douglas Hodge and Anthony Daniels.

=== Comic books ===
- Wonder Woman (vol 1) #194 (June 1971), "The Prisoner". Diana Prince, while stripped of her Wonder Woman powers, vacations in Daldonia and gets used as the double for the kidnapped princess Fabiola.
- A Mickey Mouse story The Monarch of Medioka (1937) is loosely based on the novel.
- Adapted by Mike Sekowsky. Classics Illustrated issue 76 (original edition October 1950) is The Prisoner of Zenda. (Art by H. C. Kiefer, script by Ken Fitch.)

== Homages ==
Many subsequent fictional works can be linked to The Prisoner of Zenda; indeed, this novel spawned the genre known as Ruritanian romance. What follows is a short list of those homages with a clear debt to Anthony Hope's book.

- The 1902 short story "Rupert the Resembler" is one of the so-called New Burlesques, a comedy parody by Bret Harte.
- The 30 May 1948 episode of the CBS radio series of The Adventures of Sam Spade starring Howard Duff is titled "The Prisoner of Zenda Caper" and involves a former actress who had starred in a film version of The Prisoner of Zenda before her marriage and who had lived in a castle-like mansion built in the style of the Zenda castle.
- Dornford Yates acknowledged Hope's influence in his two novels Blood Royal (1929) and Fire Below, a.k.a. By Royal Command (1930), which were set in the Ruritania-like Principality of Riechtenburg.
- John Buchan's The House of the Four Winds (1935) is an homage to The Prisoner of Zenda.
- Robert A. Heinlein adapted the Zenda plotline to his science fiction novel Double Star (1956).
- John Osborne's play The Blood of the Bambergs (1962) turns the plot into a satire on royal weddings.
- The 1965 comedy film The Great Race included an extended subplot that parodies Zenda, including a climactic fencing scene between The Great Leslie (Tony Curtis) and Baron Rolfe von Stuppe (Ross Martin). While Curtis's character performs the heroics, it is Jack Lemmon who plays the dual role of the drunken crown prince and Professor Fate, Leslie's rival/nemesis and reluctant impersonator of the prince.
- Two episodes of the spoof spy television series Get Smart, "The King Lives?" and "To Sire with Love, Parts 1 and 2", parodied the 1937 movie version, with Don Adams affecting Ronald Colman's accent, and taking place in a Ruritanian country, Coronia. A different episode "Don't Look Back" where Don Adam's Agent Smart must hide, and then compares his isolation To "the Prisoner of Zenda" also exists
- The 1970 novel Royal Flash by George MacDonald Fraser purports to explain the real story behind The Prisoner of Zenda, and indeed, in an extended literary conceit, claims to be the inspiration for Hope's novel—the narrator of the memoirs, in the framing story, tells his adventures to his lawyer, Hawkins, who can be assumed to be Anthony Hope. Otto von Bismarck and other real people such as Lola Montez are involved in the plot. It was adapted as the film Royal Flash in 1975, directed by Richard Lester, starring Malcolm McDowell as Flashman and Oliver Reed as Bismarck.
- The 1978 Doctor Who television story "The Androids of Tara" was loosely based on The Prisoner of Zenda, having been commissioned under the working title "The Androids of Zenda." While overt references to the novel were dropped from the story during production, the basic plot remained. It featured Tom Baker as the Doctor and Mary Tamm in four roles: Romana and Princess Strella, and android doubles of each. The 1980 novelisation was written by Terrance Dicks, who was script-editor on the 1984 BBC serialisation of Zenda.
- The Zenda Vendetta (TimeWars Book 4) by Simon Hawke (1985) is a science-fiction version, part of a series which pits 27th-century terrorists the Timekeepers against the Time Commandos of the US Army Temporal Corps. The Timekeepers kill Rassendyll so that the Time Commando Finn Delaney is sent back to impersonate the impersonator, both to ensure that history follows its true path and to defeat the terrorists. In the finale, the Time Commandos assault Zenda Castle with lasers and atomic grenades, both to rescue the king and to destroy the Timekeepers base.
- The 1992 Adventures in Odyssey episode "An Act of Nobility" is a whole plot reference to The Prisoner of Zenda.
- John Spurling's novel After Zenda (1995) is a tongue-in-cheek modern adventure in which Karl, the secret great-grandson of Rudolf Rassendyll and Queen Flavia, goes to post-Communist Ruritania, where he gets mixed up with various rebels and religious sects before ending up as constitutional monarch.
- The Prisoner of Zenda, Inc., a 1996 television version, is set in the contemporary United States and revolves around a high school boy who is the heir to a large corporation. The writer, Rodman Gregg, was inspired by the 1937 film version.
- De speelgoedzaaier, a Spike and Suzy comic by Willy Vandersteen, is loosely based on The Prisoner of Zenda.
- In "The Prisoner of Benda", an episode of the animated TV series Futurama, Bender impersonates (or rather, switches bodies with) the Emperor of Robo-Hungary as part of a scheme to steal the crown jewels.
- The 1994 role-playing game Castle Falkenstein lists The Prisoner of Zenda as inspiration and even includes a character named Tarlenheim.
- The Prisoner of Windsor, an audio-book by Mark Steyn, is both a sequel and an inversion of the story. Set in modern England, a Ruritanian from the House of Elphberg is called upon to stand in for an Englishman in London.
- The Henchmen of Zenda by KJ Charles is a queer historical romance retelling of the story.

== Legacy ==
In a popular but very questionable account, a German circus acrobat named Otto Witte claimed he had been briefly mistaken for the new King of Albania at the time of that country's separation from the Ottoman Empire, and that he was crowned and reigned a few days. However, the date of this claim (1913), and the lack of any evidence to back it up, suggest that Witte made up his story after seeing the first film version of the novel. The novel Every Inch a King (2005) by Harry Turtledove takes Witte's story and places it in a high fantasy setting.

Author Salman Rushdie cited The Prisoner of Zenda in the epigraph to Haroun and the Sea of Stories, the novel he wrote while living in hiding in the late 1980s.

The novel has been part of the syllabus of higher secondary schools in Pakistan for over three decades.

Nicholas Meyer in his homage to Sherlock Holmes, The Seven-Per-Cent Solution, references The Prisoner of Zenda in a footnote, describing an accidental meeting between Watson, Holmes and a "Mr. Rassendyll", whose "experiences in that kingdom and an interesting eye, witness [sic] account of the coronation of King Rudolph V can be found in Mr. Rassendyll's book on the subject, The Prisoner of Zenda, published in 1894 under the pen-name, Anthony Hope." As it is treated as a non-fiction memoir rather than fiction, this puts it in the same "universe" as The Seven-Per-Cent Solution.

== See also ==
- The Heart of Princess Osra
- Rupert of Hentzau
- The Prince and the Pauper
- Man in the Iron Mask
- Dave
- Moon over Parador
