= Brother Officers =

1915 British film by Harold M. Shaw

- Directed by: Harold M. Shaw
- Written by: Bannister Merwin; Leo Trevor
- Starring: Henry Ainley; Lettice Fairfax; Gerald Ames; Charles Rock
- Production company: London Film Company
- Release date: February 1915
- Country: United Kingdom

Brother Officers is a 1915 British silent war film directed by Harold M. Shaw and starring Henry Ainley, Lettice Fairfax and Gerald Ames. It was based on a play by Leo Trevor. A soldier wins the Victoria Cross during the First World War.

A British made film distributed by Paramount in the United States.

== Cast ==
- Henry Ainley – John Hinds
- Lettice Fairfax – Baroness Honour Royden
- Gerald Ames – Lieutenant Lancelot Pleydell
- Charles Rock – Jim Stanton
- George Bellamy – Colonel Stapleton
- Frank Stanmore – Dean
- Wyndham Guise – Bookmaker
- Gwynne Herbert – Lady Pleydell
