= Rupert of Hentzau (1915 film) =

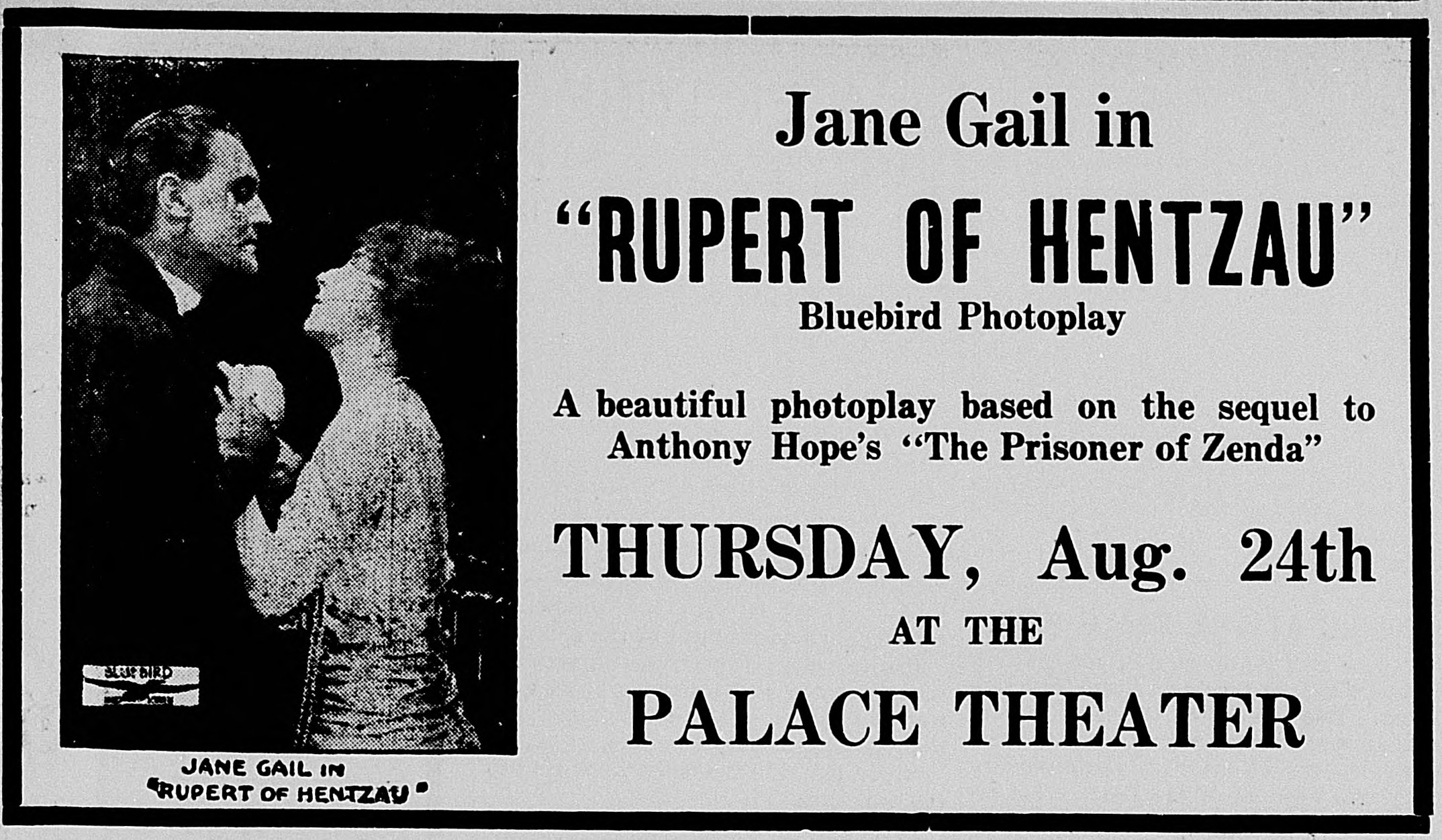
- Newspaper advert
- Directed by: George Loane Tucker
- Written by: W. Courtney Rowden
- Based on: novel Rupert of Hentzau by Anthony Hope
- Starring: Henry Ainley; Jane Gail; Gerald Ames
- Production company: London Film Company
- Release date: March 1915 (UK)
- Running time: Five reels
- Country: UK
- Language: Silent

Rupert of Hentzau is a 1915 British adventure film of the silent era. It was directed by George Loane Tucker and starred Henry Ainley, Jane Gail and Gerald Ames. It was based on the 1898 novel Rupert of Hentzau by Anthony Hope, the sequel to The Prisoner of Zenda (1894). It tells the story of the journey of an Englishmen to Ruritania in Eastern Europe where he is forced to impersonate a King to thwart the plans of a villainous aristocrat Rupert of Hentzau.

It was released in the United States in 1916, which sometimes leads to it being attributed to that year. It was later re-released in 1918 at the end of the First World War. It is believed to be a lost film, no longer known to exist in any studio archives, private collections or public archives such as the Library of Congress.

== Cast ==
- Henry Ainley as Rudolf Rassendyll / Rudolf V
- Jane Gail as Queen Flavia
- Gerald Ames as Rupert of Hentzau
- Charles Rock as Colonel Sapt
- George Bellamy as Count Von Rischenheim
- Warwick Wellington as Lieutenant Bernenstein
- Douglas Munro as Bauer
- Stella St. Audrie as Chancellor's Wife

== See also ==
- List of lost films
- Rupert of Hee Haw - a 1924 parody of the film by Stan Laurel
