= London Film Company =

British film production company (1913–1920)

The London Film Company was a British film production company active during the silent era. Founded in 1913, the company emerged as one of the dominant forces in production during the First World War. With strong financial backing the company constructed the Twickenham Studios, then the largest in Britain, and began production of features, which were then displacing short films as the dominant form. Two of the company's key early directors were Americans: Harold Shaw and George Loane Tucker. Later, British director Maurice Elvey made a number of films for the studio.

By 1915, a number of ambitious productions such as The Prisoner of Zenda and its sequel Rupert of Hentzau were attempted. However, that same year the studio had 130 employees whose wage bill was estimated to be £750 a week and it suffered heavy financial losses. The following year was more promising, with the release of The Manxman enjoying success in Britain and America. Tucker and Shaw both departed to work in other countries and production ground to a halt. For the remainder of the war, the Twickenham Studios were rented out for other companies to shoot there.

The company briefly revived after end of the war, and in 1920 it released nine films. This was the final year of operation before London Film withdrew from production completely and Twickenham was sold off.

== Filmography ==
- The House of Temperley (1913)
- Beauty and the Barge (1914, short)
- Lawyer Quince (1914, short)
- The Bosun's Mate (1914, short)
- A Christmas Carol (1914)
- The Ring and the Rajah (1914)
- The Black Spot (1914)
- England's Menace (1914)
- The King's Minister (1914)
- The Third String (1914)
- The Difficult Way (1914)
- England Expects (1914)
- Bootle's Baby (1914)
- She Stoops to Conquer (1914)
- Trilby (1914)
- On His Majesty's Service (1914)
- Called Back (1914)
- The Incomparable Bellairs (1914)
- Liberty Hall (1914)
- 1914 (1915)
- The Middleman (1915)
- The Sons of Satan (1915)
- The Shulamite (1915)
- The Heart of a Child (1915)
- The Derby Winner (1915)
- A Man of His Word (1915)
- Mr. Lyndon at Liberty (1915)
- The Christian (1915)
- Whoso Diggeth a Pit (1915)
- The Third Generation (1915)
- Brother Officers (1915)
- The King's Outcast (1915)
- The Firm of Girdlestone (1915)
- The Heart of Sister Ann (1915)
- Love in a Wood (1915)
- The Two Roads (1915)
- The Man in the Attic (1915)
- The Prisoner of Zenda (1915)
- Rupert of Hentzau (1915)
- The Game of Liberty (1916)
- His Daughter's Dilemma (1916)
- The Hypocrites (1916)
- Me and Me Moke (1916)
- Partners at Last (1916)
- The Man in Motley (1916)
- Altar Chains (1916)
- Mother Love (1916)
- The King's Daughter (1916)
- The Princess of Happy Chance (1916)
- The Man Without a Soul (1916)
- The Greater Need (1916)
- When Knights Were Bold (1916)
- Arsène Lupin (1916)
- The Mother of Dartmoor (1916)
- Vice Versa (1916)
- The Manxman (1916)
- Smith (1917)
- The Duchess of Seven Dials (1920)
- London Pride (1920)
- The Pursuit of Pamela (1920)
- True Tilda (1920)
- Lady Tetley's Decree (1920)
- The Little Welsh Girl (1920)
- Enchantment (1920)
- Judge Not (1920)
- The House on the Marsh (1920)

== Bibliography ==
- Low, Rachael. The History of the British Film: 1906-1914. Allen & Unwin, 1973.
