= The Game of Liberty =

The Game of Liberty may refer to:

- The Game of Liberty (novel), a 1915 work by E. Phillips Oppenheim
- The Game of Liberty (film), a 1916 film adaptation directed by George Loane Tucker
