= The Prisoner of Zenda (1915 film) =

- Directed by: George Loane Tucker
- Written by: W. Courtney Rowden
- Based on: The Prisoner of Zenda 1894 novel by Edward E. Rice Anthony Hope; The Prisoner of Zenda 1896 play by Edward E. Rose
- Produced by: Daniel Frohman
- Starring: Henry Ainley; Jane Gail; Gerald Ames
- Production company: London Film Company
- Distributed by: Jury Films
- Release date: March 1915
- Country: United Kingdom
- Languages: Silent; English intertitles

The Prisoner of Zenda is a 1915 British silent adventure film directed by George Loane Tucker and starring Henry Ainley, Jane Gail and Gerald Ames. Shot at Twickenham Studios, it is an adaptation of 1894 novel The Prisoner of Zenda by Anthony Hope. A film based on the 1898 sequel Rupert of Hentzau was released shortly afterwards with the same director and cast.

== Cast ==
- Henry Ainley as Rudolf Rasendyll / Rudolf V
- Jane Gail as Princess Flavia
- Gerald Ames as Rupert of Hentzau
- Arthur Holmes-Gore as Michael, Duke of Strelsau
- Charles Rock as Colonel Sapt
- George Bellamy as Captain von Rischenheim
- Norman Yates as Fritz von Tarlenheim
- Marie Anita Bozzi as Antoinette de Mauban

== Bibliography ==
- Goble, Alan. The Complete Index to Literary Sources in Film. Walter de Gruyter, 1999.
- Low, Rachael. The History of British Film, Volume III: 1914-1918. Routledge, 1997.
