= The Hypocrites (1916 film) =

- Directed by: George Loane Tucker
- Written by: Henry Arthur Jones (play); Kenelm Foss
- Starring: Elisabeth Risdon; Charles Rock; Cyril Raymond
- Production company: London Film Company
- Distributed by: Jury Films
- Release date: March 1916
- Country: United Kingdom
- Languages: Silent; English intertitles

The Hypocrites is a 1916 British silent drama film directed by George Loane Tucker and starring Elisabeth Risdon, Charles Rock and Cyril Raymond. It is also known by the alternative title The Morals of Weybury.

== Plot ==
A squire tries to make his son deny he fathered a villager's child, and wed an heiress.

== Cast ==
- Elisabeth Risdon as Rachel Neve
- Charles Rock as Squire Wilmore
- Cyril Raymond as Leonard Wilmore
- Douglas Munro as Sir John Plugenet
- Hayford Hobbs as Reverend Edgar Linnell
- Barbara Everest as Helen Plugenet
- Gerald Ames as Aubrey Viveash

== Bibliography ==
- Goble, Alan. The Complete Index to Literary Sources in Film. Walter de Gruyter, 1999.
