= The Bosun's Mate =

1914 British film by Harold M. Shaw

- Release date: 1914
- Country: United Kingdom
- Language: Silent

Redir

The Bosun's Mate is a 1914 British silent crime and comedy film directed by Harold M. Shaw and starring Mary Brough, Charles Rock and Wyndham Guise. It is an adaptation of a play by W. W. Jacobs.

== Premise ==
An ex-boatswain plans to rob a widow with the help of a former soldier.

== Cast ==
- Mary Brough – Mrs. Walters
- Charles Rock
- Wyndham Guise – Ned Travers
- W.H. Berry – George Benn
- George Bellamy
- Judd Green
- John East
- Brian Daly
