= Called Back (1914 British film) =

1914 film directed by George Loane Tucker

- Directed by: George Loane Tucker
- Written by: Hugh Conway (novel); Comyns Carr
- Starring: Henry Ainley; Jane Gail; Charles Rock
- Production company: London Film Company
- Distributed by: London Film Company
- Release date: October 1914
- Country: United Kingdom
- Languages: Silent; English intertitles

Called Back is a 1914 British silent drama film directed by George Loane Tucker and starring Henry Ainley, Jane Gail and Charles Rock. It is based on the 1833 novel Called Back.

== Cast ==
- Henry Ainley as Gilbert Vaughan
- Jane Gail as Pauline March
- Charles Rock as Macari
- George Bellamy as Dr. Manuel Ceneri
- Vincent Clive as Anthony March
- Akerman May as Petroff
- Judd Green as Drunk

== Bibliography ==
- Brian McFarlane & Anthony Slide. The Encyclopedia of British Film: Fourth Edition. Oxford University Press, 2013.
