= Behind the Stockade =

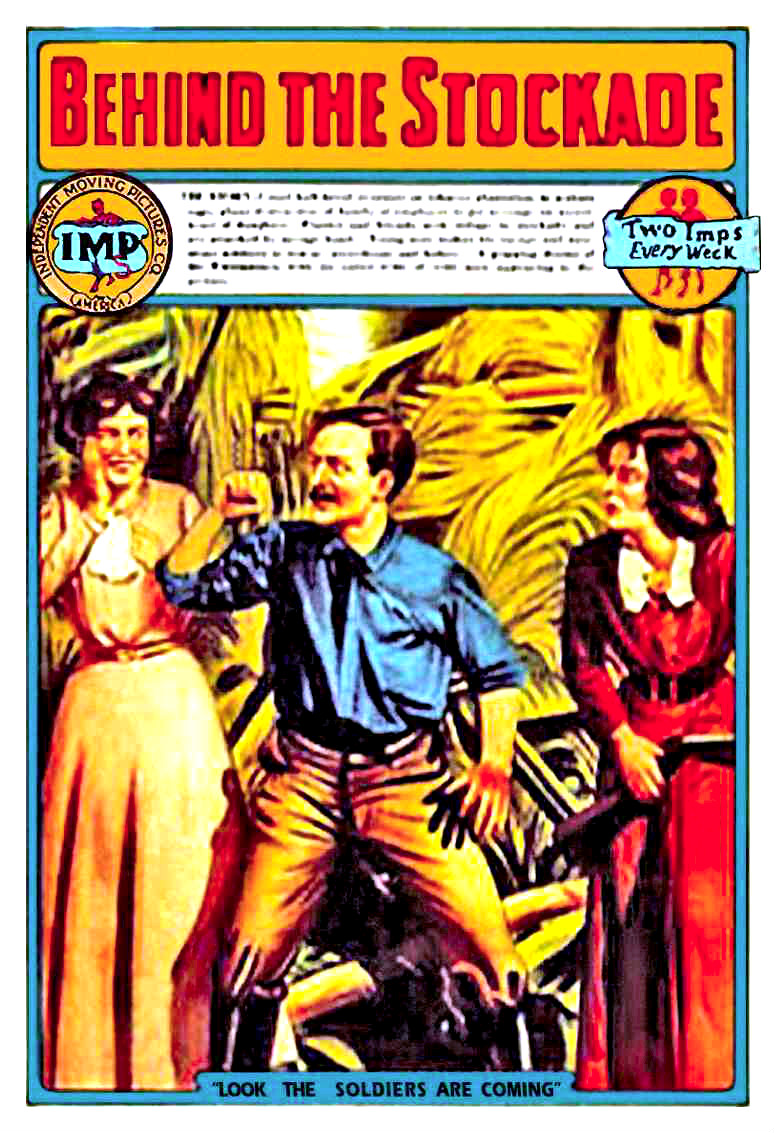
- Directed by: Thomas H. Ince; George Loane Tucker
- Written by: George Loane Tucker
- Produced by: Carl Laemmle; Independent Moving Pictures Company of America(IMP)
- Starring: Mary Pickford; Owen Moore
- Distributed by: Motion Picture Distributors and Sales Company
- Release date: June 12, 1911
- Running time: 1 reel
- Country: USA
- Language: Silent

Behind the Stockade is a 1911 short film drama co-directed by Thomas H. Ince and George Loane Tucker. It starred real-life married couple Mary Pickford and Owen Moore.

Only a shortened version of this film survives. It is part of RKO's Flicker Flashbacks (Series 5 No. 1) from 1947.

== Cast ==
- Mary Pickford - Florence Williams
- Owen Moore - Billy Thompson
