= The Difficult Way =

1914 British film by George Loane Tucker

- Directed by: George Loane Tucker
- Starring: Jane Gail; Langhorn Burton; Gerald Ames
- Production company: London Film Company
- Distributed by: London Film Company
- Release date: 1914
- Running time: 76 minutes
- Country: United Kingdom
- Languages: Silent; English intertitles

The Difficult Way is a 1914 British silent drama film directed by George Loane Tucker and starring Jane Gail, Gerald Ames and Langhorn Burton.

== Cast ==
- Jane Gail as Nan
- Gerald Ames as Roger Wentworth
- Langhorn Burton as Rev. John Pilgrim

== Bibliography ==
- Brian McFarlane & Anthony Slide. The Encyclopedia of British Film: Fourth Edition. Oxford University Press, 2013.
