= The MiddleMan (1915 film) =

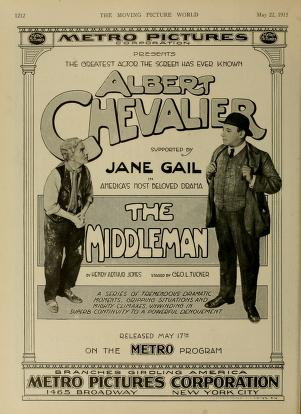
- Directed by: George Loane Tucker
- Written by: Bannister Merwin(scenario) play by Henry Arthur Jones
- Produced by: London Film Productions
- Starring: Albert Chevalier; Jane Gail
- Distributed by: Jury Imperial Pictures(UK); Metro Pictures(USA
- Release date: 17 May 1915
- Running time: 5 reels
- Country: United Kingdom
- Languages: Silent; English titles

The MiddleMan is a lost 1915 silent film drama directed by George Loane Tucker and starring Albert Chevalier a popular music hall performer and Jane Gail. In the US the film was distributed by Metro Pictures.

== Cast ==
- Albert Chevalier as Cyrus Blenkarn
- Jane Gail as Mary Blenkarn
- Gerald Ames as Julian Chandler
- Douglas Munro as Joseph Chandler
- George Bellamy as Sir Seaton umfraville
- Minna Grey as Maud Chandler
- Christine Rayner as Nancy
- Hubert Willis as Batty Todd
- Gwynne Herbert as Mrs. Chandler
