= The Black Spot (film) =

1914 British film by George Loane Tucker

- Directed by: George Loane Tucker
- Written by: Bannister Merwin; Hesketh Prichard
- Starring: Jane Gail; Charles Rock; Gerald Ames
- Production company: London Film Company
- Distributed by: London Film Company
- Release date: April 1914
- Country: United Kingdom
- Languages: Silent; English intertitles

The Black Spot is a 1914 British silent thriller film directed by George Loane Tucker and starring Jane Gail, Charles Rock, and Gerald Ames.

== Cast ==
- Jane Gail as Olga Scerloff
- Arthur Holmes-Gore as Duke Paul
- Charles Rock as Professor Scerloff
- Gerald Ames as Serge Malkow

== Bibliography ==
- Brian McFarlane & Anthony Slide. The Encyclopedia of British Film: Fourth Edition. Oxford University Press, 2013.
