= Bitter Fruit (disambiguation) =

Bitter Fruit is a 2001 novel by Achmat Dangor

== Books ==
- Bitter Fruit (poem), 1937 poem by Abel Meeropol in The New York Teacher, base of the Billie Holiday song "Strange Fruit"
- Bitter Fruit, The Story of the American Coup in Guatemala Stephen Schlesinger 1982
- Bitter Fruit, collection of stories by Sa'adat Hasan Manto

== Film and TV ==
- Bitter Fruit (1920 film), American silent film
- Bitter Fruit (1967 film) (Fruits amers), French film directed by Jacqueline Audry
- "Bitter Fruit" 1993 Season 2 Episode 12 of Street Justice (1991 TV Series)
- "Bitter Fruit" 1995 Season 6 Episode 1 of Law & Order (1990 TV Series)
- "A Bitter Fruit" 1998 Season 1 Episode 38 of Tokyo Pig (1997 TV Series)
- Bitter Fruits (Gorki plodovi) 2008 Serbian TV Series Predrag Miletić

== Music ==
- "Bitter Fruit", single by Steven Van Zandt from Freedom – No Compromise
- "Bitter Fruit", song by The Kills from Ash & Ice
- "Bitter Fruit", song by Blue Rodeo from The Days In Between
- "Bitter Fruit", song by Billie Myers from Vertigo
