= Edwin C. Hill =

American journalist (1884 or 1885 - 1957)

Edwin C. Hill (1884 or 1885 – February 12, 1957) was an American newspaper reporter and radio news commentator. His obituary in The New York Times said that he "had interviewed about 1,000 newsworthy men and women" in addition to having "covered many of the major news stories of his day". Chester Sanders Lord, editor of the New York Sun, called him "the world's best reporter". His reporting, whether in print or on radio, went beyond the facts of an event to enable listeners and readers to feel the event's effects on people.

== Early years ==
Hill was born and raised in Aurora, Indiana, and finished high school there. His mother died when he was 6 weeks old, and he was raised by his grandparents, Mr. and Mrs. Abraham Hill. He graduated from Indiana University in 1901 and did post-graduate work at Butler College.

== Career ==
=== Newspapers ===
After Hill's college graduation he wrote for the Indianapolis Journal, the Indianapolis Press, the Indianapolis Sentinel, and newspapers in Cincinnati and Fort Wayne. He began working for the New York Sun by 1904 as a "space writer", which meant that his pay was determined by the amount of his work that the newspaper published. After his story about a fire at an empty theater received front-page placement, his visibility increased, and "In a few months he was recognized as one of New York's crack reporters." By 1923, however, he began to feel occupational burnout, and he left the newspaper to work in the film industry. After four years there, he returned to the Sun in 1927. Hill's column, "The Human Side of the News", was distributed by King Features Syndicate.

=== Radio ===
Hill's transition to radio came after an unsuccessful audition. An employee on the publicity staff at CBS suggested to network officials that they audition Hill for an on-air position. The young man, who had worked with Hill and been mentored by him, pointed out Hill's journalistic experience and the quality of his voice. Someone else was selected for that job, but an advertising agency executive who attended the audition liked what he heard, and he soon hired Hill for another radio position.

Hill first broadcast on radio in 1931. He began making regular broadcasts in 1932 and continued for more than two decades, usually with 15-minute programs that often were titled The Human Side of the News. During various parts of that span he was heard on ABC, CBS, and NBC. In 1951 Hill had concurrent programs on ABC and NBC. He continued on ABC into 1955. His last work on radio occurred when he filled in for Walter Winchell while Winchell was on vacation in the summer of 1956.

==== Critical response ====
Time magazine said of Hill as a broadcaster, "His deep timbred voice, easy delivery, [and] intelligent interpretation of the day’s news won him a tremendous following." A 1938 newspaper article said, "But Edwin C. Hill had a voice — deep, rich, sonorous — that could express far better than printer's ink, the movement, the color and the emotion of his words."

=== Films ===
Hill's first stint with the film industry in 1923 found him initially doing research, then editing scenarios, and finally becoming a talent scout. In 1927 he left that field and returned to the Sun. A newspaper article in 1930 noted that Hill "does not remember those years with any great pleasure". In May 1934 Hill was signed to write and deliver the narration for Hearst Metrotone News newsreels. Newsreels had had narrators before Hill, but he was the first one to "attempt to give the complete background of events pictured", in contrast to those who had just described what was visible on the screen. Hill narrated the industrial film Steel: Man's Servant (1938), and he wrote the story for The Fighting President (1933), a six-reel film about Franklin D. Roosevelt.

=== Politics ===
President Theodore Roosevelt considered Hill a member of his "unofficial cabinet", and The New York Times said that Hill's reporting about Franklin D. Roosevelt's initial campaign for governor of New York helped to boost Roosevelt's political career.

=== Books ===
- The Iron Horse (1925) Novel adapted from the scenario of the film The Iron Horse (1924).
- The American Scene: The Inside Story (M. Witmark & Sons, 1933)
- The Human Side of the News (1934)

== Later years ==
"Old-Fashioned Thanksgiving Story", a recording of Hill's reminiscences about how that holiday was celebrated as he grew up in Indiana, was broadcast annually for the last 20 years of his life. Another annual holiday broadcast was a recording of a Christmas story that Hill had obtained in England. The story was revised several times. Shortly before he died, he completed a series of 52 human-interest stories.

== Personal life and death ==
Hill died on February 12, 1957, in St. Anthony's Hospital in St. Petersburg, Florida, aged 72. At the time of his death he was married to former actress Jane Gail.
