= The Manxman (1916 film) =

1916 British film

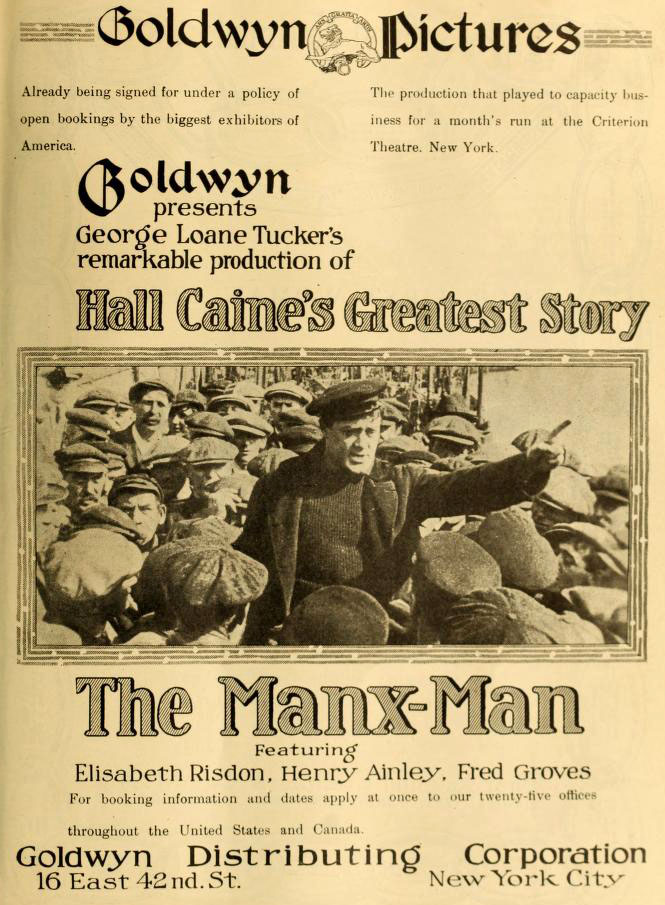
- U.S. theatrical release poster
- Directed by: George Loane Tucker
- Written by: Kenelm Foss
- Based on: The Manxman by Hall Caine
- Starring: Elisabeth Risdon; Henry Ainley; Fred Groves
- Production company: London Film Company
- Distributed by: Jury Films; Goldwyn Pictures
- Release dates: December 1916 (United Kingdom); 19 August 1917 (United States)
- Running time: 90 minutes
- Country: United Kingdom
- Language: Silent film with English intertitles

The Manxman (also known as The Manx-Man) is a 1916 British silent drama film directed by George Loane Tucker and starring Elisabeth Risdon, Henry Ainley and Fred Groves. It is based on the 1894 novel of the same name by Hall Caine. A second silent adaptation, directed by Alfred Hitchcock, was released in 1929.

Upon its release in England in December 1916, The Manxman was a financial and critical success. It was one of relatively few British films to also become a hit in the United States. No copies of the film are known to exist, and The Manxman nitrate was destroyed by a fire in the 1965 MGM vault fire.

== Cast ==
- Elisabeth Risdon - Kate Gregeen
- Henry Ainley - Philip Christian
- Fred Groves - Pete Quillian
- Adeline Hayden Coffin - Governor's wife
- Will Corrie - Fisherman
- John Marlborough East - Casar Cregeen
- Kenelm Foss - Ross Christian
- Lewis Gilbert - Black Tom
- Minna Grey - Mona
- Gwynne Herbert - Aunt Nan
- Philip Hewland - Governor
- Mary Merrall - Tom's girl
- John Milton - Quiggan
- Guy Newall - Secretary
- Edward O'Neill - Iron Christian
- Frank Stanmore - Kelley
- Hubert Willis - Clerk
- Bert Wynne - Peter Christian

== Production notes ==
Produced by the London Film Company, The Manxman was filmed on location on the Isle of Man.
