= Midnight (1931 film) =

1931 film

- John Stuart and Eve Gray in the film
- Directed by: George King
- Written by: Charles Bennett; Billie Bristow
- Produced by: Harry Cohen
- Starring: Eve Gray; George Bellamy; Ellen Pollock
- Production company: Harry Cohen Productions
- Distributed by: Fox Film Company
- Release date: 1931
- Running time: 44 minutes
- Country: United Kingdom
- Language: English

Midnight is a 1931 British comedy crime film directed by George King and starring Eve Gray, George Bellamy and Ellen Pollock. It was written by Charles Bennett and Billie Bristow, and was a quota quickie made at Nettlefold Studios for distribution by the British subsidiary of the American Fox Film Company.

== Preservation status ==
The British Film Institute National Archive holds a collection of stills but no film or video materials.

== Plot ==
Larry Byrne is a young man about town who intentionally leaves a clue behind after stealing a set of secret plans from a safe. His deliberate trail brings three people to his flat at midnight: two foreign spies, Sonia and Max, and Dorothy Harding, the daughter of a general, who is desperately trying to clear her father's name by recovering the stolen documents. Larry and his servant intervene just in time to save Dorothy's life and apprehend the spies. Larry reveals his true identity: he is not a thief at all, but a secret service agent.

== Cast ==
- John Stuart as Larry Byrne
- Eve Gray as Dorothy Harding
- George Bellamy as Max Strubel
- Ellen Pollock as Sonia Strubel
- Kiyoshi Takase as Ching

== Reception ==
Film Weekly wrote: "It's a talkie, but it's done heartily in the spirit of the old school, complete with sneering, snarling villain and slinky, sinuous vamp. ... Unambitious, with no intention other than to entertain for half an hour or so, this little picture is well acted, cleanly made and successful in its purpose."

Kine Weekly wrote: "George King has handled his subject extremely well, and carries it through in a light vein. The quips and gags are followed up, talk is effectively punctuated with action, and the love interest is there without being obtrusive. This is a Quota picture, but this is mentioned for obvious reasons and not in a damaging sense, for the picture is worth its place on any programme on its merits alone."

The Daily Film Renter wrote: "Fair acting and recording, and sufficiently entertaining to rank as program support booking for the general run of halls. This simple spy affair on old-fashioned lines has been directed quite straightforwardly by George King, so that the development is easily followed."
