= The King's Daughter (1916 film) =

- Directed by: Maurice Elvey
- Written by: Alexandre Dumas (novel)
- Starring: Gerald Ames; Janet Ross; Edward O'Neill; Hayford Hobbs
- Production company: London Film Company
- Distributed by: Jury Films
- Release date: December 1916
- Country: United Kingdom
- Languages: Silent; English intertitles

The King's Daughter is a 1916 British silent historical film directed by Maurice Elvey and starring Gerald Ames, Janet Ross and Edward O'Neill. The film is based on a novel by Alexandre Dumas.

== Cast ==
- Gerald Ames as Montrose
- Janet Ross as Hélène
- Edward O'Neill as The King
- Hayford Hobbs as Dubois
- Hubert Willis as Chief of Police

== Bibliography ==
- Klossner, Michael. The Europe of 1500-1815 on Film and Television: A Worldwide Filmography of Over 2550 Works, 1895 Through 2000. McFarland & Company, 2002.
