= Arsène Lupin (1916 film) =

1916 British silent film by George Loane Tucker

Arsene Lupin
- Directed by: George Loane Tucker
- Written by: Kenelm Foss
- Based on: Arsène Lupin; 1908 play by Maurice Leblanc; Francis de Croisset
- Starring: Gerald Ames; Manora Thew; Kenelm Foss
- Production company: London Film Company
- Distributed by: Jury Films
- Release date: June 1916
- Country: United Kingdom
- Languages: Silent; English intertitles

Arsene Lupin is a 1916 British silent crime film directed by George Loane Tucker and starring Gerald Ames, Manora Thew and Kenelm Foss. It features the popular French master criminal Arsene Lupin, and is the first instance of the character in English-language media.

== Cast ==
- Gerald Ames as Arsene Lupin
- Manora Thew as Savia
- Kenelm Foss as Inspector Guerchard
- Douglas Munro as Gournay-Martin
- Marga Rubia Levy
- Philip Hewland

== Bibliography ==
- Low, Rachael. The History of British Film, Volume III: 1914-1918. Routledge, 1997.
