= Enchantment (1920 film) =

1920 film

- Directed by: Einar Bruun
- Written by: Frank Powell; E. Temple Thurston (novel)
- Starring: Henry Krauss; Mary Odette; Eric Barclay
- Production company: London Film Company
- Distributed by: Jury Films
- Release date: February 1920
- Country: United Kingdom
- Languages: Silent; English intertitles

Enchantment is a 1920 British silent drama film directed by Einar Bruun and starring Henry Krauss, Mary Odette and Eric Barclay.

== Cast ==
- Henry Krauss as John Desmond
- Mary Odette as Pat Desmond
- Eric Barclay as Charles Stuart
- Edward O'Neill as Sandy Stuart
- Henry Vibart as Father Casey
- Mary Brough as Mrs. Slattery
- George Bellamy as Tim Cassidy
- Joyce Barbour as Sophie Desmond
- C. Hargrave Mansell as Dr. O'Connor
- Caleb Porter as Sailor

== Bibliography ==
- Low, Rachael. The History of the British Film 1918-1929. George Allen & Unwin, 1971.
