= She Stoops to Conquer (1914 film) =

- Directed by: George Loane Tucker
- Written by: Oliver Goldsmith (play); Bannister Merwin
- Starring: Henry Ainley; Jane Gail; Gregory Scott
- Production company: London Film Productions
- Distributed by: Gaumont British Distributors
- Release date: March 1914
- Country: United Kingdom
- Languages: Silent; English intertitles

She Stoops to Conquer is a 1914 British silent historical comedy film directed by George Loane Tucker and starring Henry Ainley, Jane Gail and Gregory Scott. It is an adaptation of Oliver Goldsmith's play She Stoops to Conquer.

This was Fay Compton's first screen appearance.

== Cast ==
- Henry Ainley as Marlow
- Jane Gail as Kate Hardcastle
- Gregory Scott as Jeremy
- Charles Rock as Hardcastle
- Wyndham Guise as Tony Lumpkin
- Christine Rayner as Constance Neville
- Gerald Ames as Hastings
- Lewis Gilbert as Sir Charles Marlow
- Stella St. Audrie as Mrs. Hardcastle
- Nelson Ramsey as Landlord
- Fay Compton as Barmaid

== Bibliography ==
- Goble, Alan. The Complete Index to Literary Sources in Film. Walter de Gruyter, 1999.
