= A Tale of Two Cities (1922 film) =

1922 film

- Directed by: Walter Courtney Rowden
- Written by: Walter Courtney Rowden
- Based on: A Tale of Two Cities; 1859 novel by Charles Dickens
- Produced by: H.B. Parkinson
- Starring: Clive Brook; Ann Trevor; J. Fisher White
- Production company: Master Films
- Distributed by: British Exhibitors' Films
- Release date: 1922
- Country: United Kingdom
- Language: English

A Tale of Two Cities is a 1922 British silent drama film directed by Walter Courtney Rowden and starring Clive Brook, Ann Trevor and J. Fisher White. The film is an adaptation of the 1859 novel A Tale of Two Cities by Charles Dickens, and its plot concerns events taking place during the French Revolution. It was made as part of the "Tense Moments with Great Authors Series" of films.

== Premise ==
During the French Revolution, a jaundiced British lawyer takes the place of a French aristocrat who has been sentenced to the guillotine.

== Cast ==
- Clive Brook as Sydney Carton
- Ann Trevor as Lucie Manette
- J. Fisher White as Doctor Alexandre Manette

== Bibliography ==
- Scott, Ian. From Pinewood to Hollywood: British Filmmakers in American Cinema, 1910-1969. Palgrave MacMillan, 2010.
