= Hubert Willis =

British actor (1862–1933)

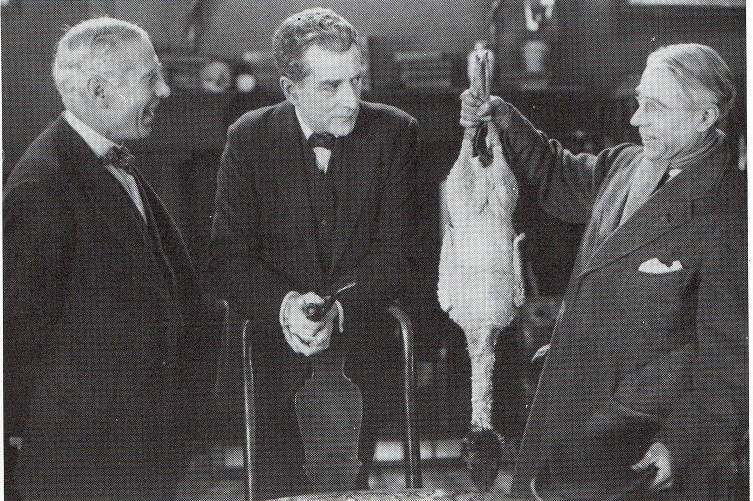
Hubert Willis, Eille Norwood and Douglas Payne in The Blue Carbuncle (1923)

Hubert Willis (1862 – 13 December 1933) was a British actor best known for his recurring role as Doctor Watson in a series of silent Sherlock Holmes films co-starring with Eille Norwood.

== Stage career ==
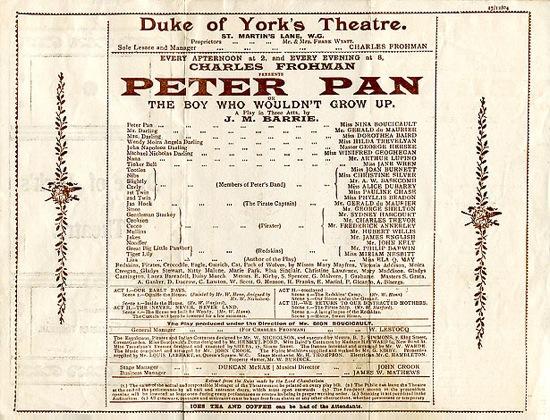
Programme for Peter Pan at the Duke of York's Theatre (1904) in which Willis played the pirate Mullins

Willis appeared in the copyright performance of William Gillette's play Sherlock Holmes (1899) in an unknown role. He played Planchette and Lavrille in Never Again at the Vaudeville Theatre (1897) opposite Allan Aynesworth. Captain Welsh opposite Robert Taber in Bonnie Dundee at the Adelphi Theatre (1900); Brother Jerome in The Sacrament of Judas at the Comedy Theatre (1901); Rushey Platt, MP in Love in Idleness at Terry's Theatre (1902). Dick Snaresby in Brown at Brighton at the Avenue Theatre (1903); Mullins in the original stage production of Peter Pan at the Duke of York's Theatre (1904) opposite Gerald du Maurier as Captain Hook/Mr. Darling and Nina Boucicault as Peter Pan; Jenkins in Castles in Spain at the Royalty Theatre (1906); Dubois in The Hon'ble Phil opposite G. P. Huntley at Hicks Theatre (1908); Mr. Curry in The Test at the Court Theatre (1906). and Village Handyman in The Man with his Back to the East at the Court Theatre (1912).

== Sherlock Holmes films ==
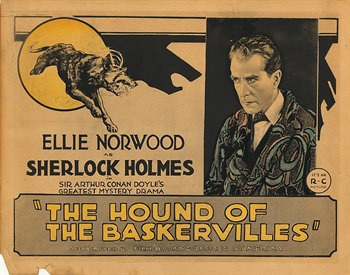
Poster for The Hound of the Baskervilles (1921)

Willis made his first film appearance as Shelton in the silent film The House of Temperley (1913), an adaptation of Rodney Stone by Arthur Conan Doyle. Between 1921 and 1923 he played Dr. Watson in 44 short films and one full length film opposite Eille Norwood as Sherlock Holmes including The Hound of the Baskervilles (1921) and in three series of 15 episodes each in The Adventures of Sherlock Holmes (1921); in The Further Adventures of Sherlock Holmes (1922), and in The Last Adventures of Sherlock Holmes (1923). In the episode The Sign of Four (1923) Willis was replaced by Arthur Cullin as Dr. Watson.

== Personal life ==
In 1892, Willis married (Harriet) Annie Godfrey (1861), an actress, and together they had a daughter, Winifred, who also became an actress. He lived at 39 Marlborough Crescent in Bedford Park, Chiswick, West London. Willis died in December 1933, leaving £4,105 1s 4d in his will.

== Selected filmography ==
- A Message From Mars (1913)
- Liberty Hall (1914)
- The MiddleMan (1915)
- The King's Daughter (1916)
- The Mother of Dartmoor (1916)
- Partners at Last (1916)
- His Daughter's Dilemma (1916)
- A Gamble for Love (1917)
- Justice (1917)
- The Manxman (1917)
- The Manchester Man (1920)
- Lady Audley's Secret (1920)
- The Pursuit of Pamela (1920)
- The Duchess of Seven Dials (1920)
