= A Fortune at Stake =

- Directed by: Walter West
- Written by: Nat Gould
- Produced by: Walter West
- Starring: Violet Hopson; Gerald Ames; Edward O'Neill; James Lindsay
- Release date: 1918
- Country: United Kingdom

A Fortune at Stake is a 1918 British silent drama film directed by Walter West and starring Violet Hopson, Gerald Ames and Edward O'Neill. It was based on a novel by Nat Gould.

== Cast ==
- Violet Hopson as Lady Launcelot
- Gerald Ames as Will Martindale
- Edward O'Neill as Lord Launcelot
- James Lindsay
- Wyndham Guise
- Gwynne Herbert
- Tom Coventry
