= Quinneys (1919 film) =

1919 film by Herbert Brenon, Maurice Elvey, and Rex Wilson

Quinneys is a 1919 British silent romance film directed by Herbert Brenon, Maurice Elvey, and Rex Wilson and stars Henry Ainley, Isobel Elsom and Eric Harrison. It is an adaptation of the play Quinneys by Horace Annesley Vachell which was again made into a film in 1927.

A reported £100,000 worth of props were used for the film.

== Plot ==
An antique dealer's daughter loves a foreman who sells fakes to his ex-partner.

== Cast ==
- Henry Ainley as Joseph Quinney
- Isobel Elsom as Posy Quinney
- Eric Harrison as James Miggott
- Tom Reynolds as Sam Tomlin
- Roland Pertwee as Cyrus Hunsucker
- Marie Wright as Mabel Dredge

== Bibliography ==
- Bamford, Kenton. Distorted Images: British National Identity and Film in the 1920s. I.B. Tauris, 1999.
