= The Christian (1915 film) =

1915 British film by George Loane Tucker

- Directed by: George Loane Tucker
- Written by: Hall Caine (play)
- Starring: Derwent Hall Caine; Elizabeth Risdon
- Production company: London Film Company
- Distributed by: Jury’s Imperial Pictures
- Release date: 1915
- Running time: 6 reels; 9,170 feet
- Country: United Kingdom
- Languages: Silent; English intertitles

The Christian is a 1915 British silent film directed by George Loane Tucker and starring Derwent Hall Caine and Elizabeth Risdon. The film is an adaptation of Hall Caine's 1898 play The Christian. This was the third film of the story, the first The Christian (1911) was made in Australia and the second The Christian (1914) was made in the United States. The Christian was made by the London Film company, which was at the time England's most highly regarded producing organisation and whose policy was to film works of the great authors.

== Cast ==
- Derwent Hall Caine as John Storm
- Elisabeth Risdon as Glory Quayle
- Philip Hewland as Lord Storm
- Bert Wynne as Lord Robert Ure
- Gerald Ames as Francis Drake
- Charles Rock as Parson Quayle
- Douglas Munro as Canon Wealthy
- Frank Stanmore as Curate Golightly
- George Bellamy as Father Lamplugh
- Christine Rayne as Polly Love
- Gwynne Herbert as Mrs. Macrae
- Mary Dibley as Mercy (her daughter)

== Bibliography ==
- Goble, Alan. The Complete Index to Literary Sources in Film. Walter de Gruyter, 1999.
