= The Cinderella Man (film) =

1917 silent film

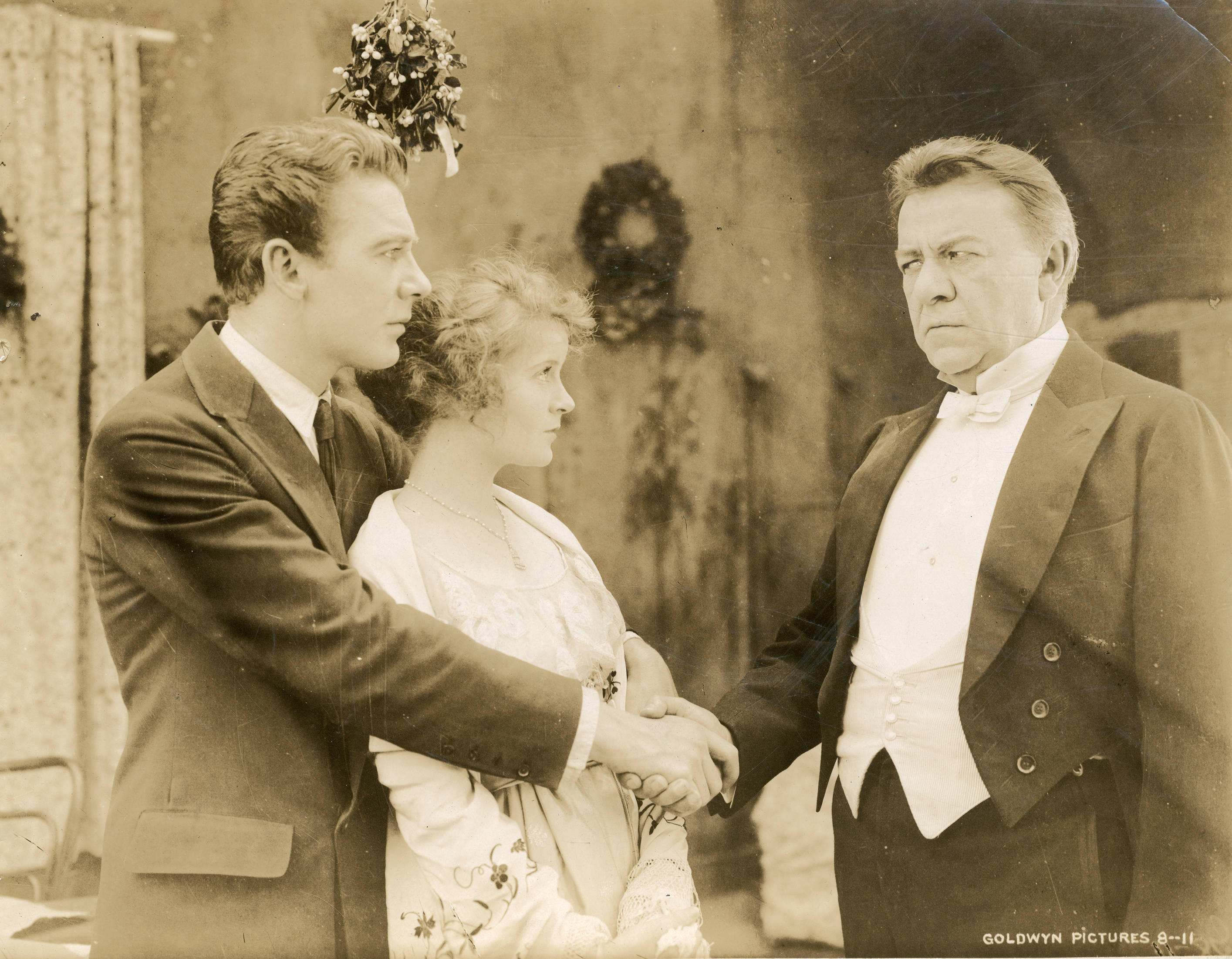
- Directed by: George Loane Tucker
- Written by: Edward Childs Carpenter (play); George Loane Tucker
- Produced by: Samuel Goldwyn
- Starring: Mae Marsh; Tom Moore; Alec B. Francis, Venie Atherton
- Cinematography: George W. Hill
- Production company: Goldwyn Pictures
- Distributed by: Goldwyn Pictures
- Release date: December 16, 1917
- Running time: 60 minutes
- Country: United States
- Languages: Silent; English intertitles

The Cinderella Man is a 1917 American silent comedy film directed by George Loane Tucker and starring Mae Marsh, Tom Moore and Alec B. Francis. The film's sets were designed by the art director Hugo Ballin.

== Plot summary ==
When Marjorie Caner returns from abroad, she is quite lonely in her millionaire father's big house. Learning that a young poet, Anthony Quintard, is living in poverty next door while working on the libretto of a great opera, she skips across the roofs and brings him a Christmas banquet. The poet sees Marjorie, and knowing that he detests wealth, she pretends to be the secretary of the Caner family. Marjorie volunteers to type his libretto, and a close intimacy grows between them. Tony wins a $10,000 prize for his work but is enraged when he discovers that Marjorie is an heiress. Morris Caner, mellowed under his daughter's tutelage, comes to the rescue by feigning financial ruin, and manages to reconcile the two lovers.

== Cast ==
- Mae Marsh as Marjorie Caner
- Tom Moore as Anthony Quintard
- Alec B. Francis as Romney Evans
- George Fawcett as Morris Caner
- Louis R. Grisel as Primrose
- George Farren as William Sewall
- Elizabeth Arians as Mrs. Prune
- Mrs. J. Cogan as Celeste
- Dean Raymond as Dr. Thayer
- Harry Scarborough as Blodgett

== General and cited references ==
- McCaffrey, Donald W.; Jacobs, Christopher P. (1999). Guide to the Silent Years of American Cinema. Westport, Conn.: Greenwood Publishing. doi:10.5040/9798400660429. ISBN 0313303452. OCLC 1035089232.
