= Traffic in Souls =

1913 film by George Loane Tucker

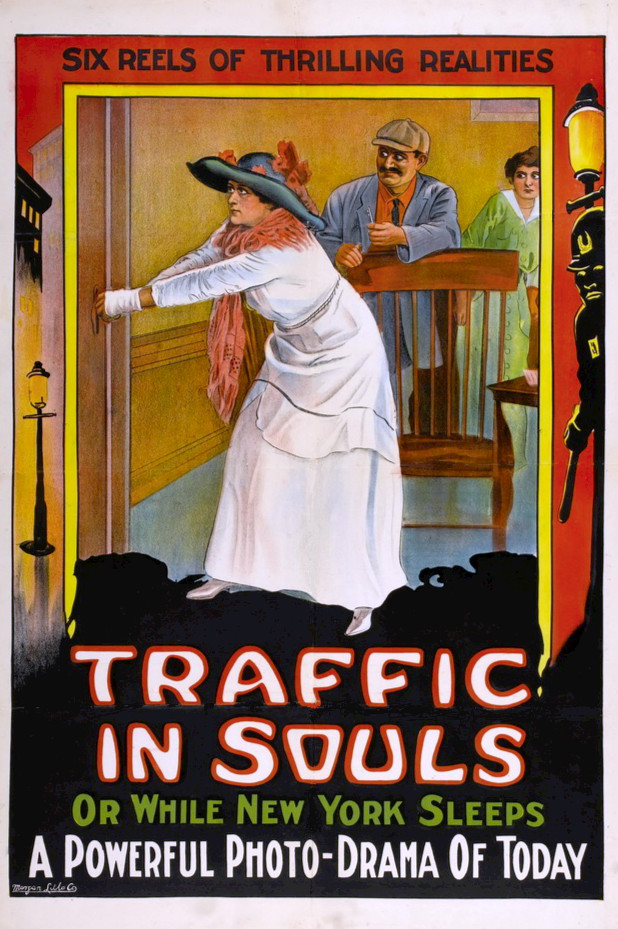
- Theatrical poster
- Directed by: George Loane Tucker
- Written by: Walter MacNamara (scenario)
- Story by: George Loane Tucker
- Produced by: Walter MacNamara; Jack Cohn (uncredited)
- Starring: Jane Gail; Ethel Grandin; William H. Turner; Matt Moore
- Cinematography: Henry Alder Leach
- Edited by: Jack Cohn (uncredited)
- Music by: Philip Carli (1994 release)
- Production company: Independent Moving Pictures
- Distributed by: Universal Film Manufacturing Company
- Release date: November 24, 1913
- Running time: 88 minutes
- Country: United States
- Language: Silent (English intertitles)
- Budget: $5,700
- Box office: $450,000

Full movie

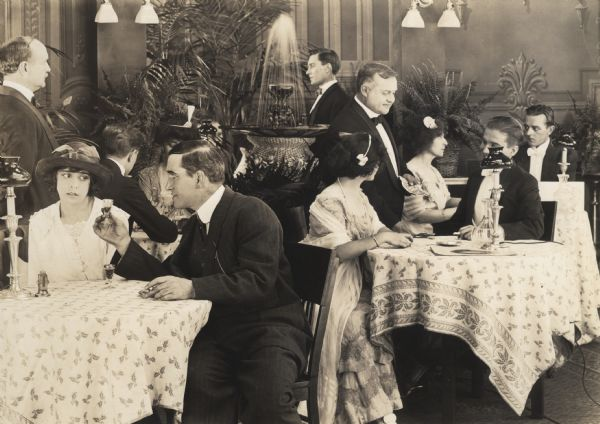
Lorna Barton (played by Ethel Grandin) is tempted by the procurer Bill Bradshaw (William Cavanaugh) in a cafe.

Traffic in Souls (also released as While New York Sleeps) is a 1913 American silent crime drama film focusing on forced prostitution (white slavery) in the United States. Directed by George Loane Tucker and starring Jane Gail, Ethel Grandin, William H. Turner, and Matt Moore, Traffic in Souls is an early example of the narrative style in American films. The film consists of six reels, which was longer than most American films of the era.

A copy of Traffic in Souls is preserved at the Library of Congress and the Film Preservation Associates. In 2006, the film was selected for preservation in the National Film Registry by the Library of Congress because it "presaged the Hollywood narrative film" and drew attention through its riveting depiction of the methods used to entrap young women into prostitution.

== Plot ==
The storyline concerns two young Swedish women immigrants who are approached by men soliciting for white slavery under the guise of a legitimate work offer. In the scenes filmed at Battery Park, after the women are transported there from Ellis Island, real immigrants can be seen in the background.

The entire film takes place over the course of three days and consists of a prologue; the main narrative in which one of the sisters is kidnapped by a pimp and the other sister and her boyfriend rush to rescue her in time and the pimp is killed; and an epilogue in which the viewer finds out the consequences from a trashed news article. The film concludes with a joke ending, an ending to a thriller that at the time was not the cliché it has become now.

== Cast ==
- Jane Gail as Mary Barton
- Ethel Grandin as Lorna Barton
- William H. Turner as Issac Barton, The Invalid Inventor - Mary's Father (credited as Wm. Turner)
- Matt Moore as NYPD officer Larry Burke
- Walter Long as other policeman (Uncredited)
- William Welsh as William Trubus
- Millie Liston as Mrs. Trubus (credited as Mrs. Hudson Lyston)
- Irene Wallace as Alice Trubus
- William Cavanaugh as Bill Bradshaw
- Howard Crampton as the go-between
- Arthur Hunter as the procurer
- William Burbidge as Mr. Smith
- Laura Huntley as the emigrant girl
- William Powers as the emigrant girl's brother
- Jack Poulson as R.C. Cadet
- Edward Boring as Swedish Cadet

== Production ==
Traffic in Souls was based on a story by the film's director George Loane Tucker. The scenario was written by Walter MacNamara who also served as producer with Jack Cohn. Executive producers include King Baggot, Herbert Brenon, William Robert Daly, and Carl Laemmle.

The film was shot and produced by Universal Film Manufacturing Company in Fort Lee, New Jersey, where many early film studios in America's first motion picture industry were based at the beginning of the 20th century. Additional footage was shot on location at Ellis Island and Manhattan. Its subjects were working women who had immigrated to the United States, and it was released at a time when the country was undergoing a "moral panic" over the issue of prostitution. While the film was passed by the National Board of Review as suggesting methods of controlling prostitution or reform of a prostitute, the film's release eventually resulted in the adding of "white slavery" to the list of topics banned under the Hays Code.

Terry Ramsaye, an early film historian, wrote in his book A Million and One Nights, that Traffic In Souls was made in under four weeks with a small budget of $5,000. He also claimed that all the money came from George Loane Tucker, Herbert Brenon, William Robert Daly, King Baggot, and Jack Cohn. Furthermore, he also wrote that the film had to be made in secret because Carl Laemmle (the future head of Universal Film) tried to stop the film's production and did not want to release it when completed. While Ramsaye's account of the Silent Era is influential, many of his claims have been challenged or rejected by contemporary scholars. Film historian Kevin Brownlow found evidence that the film actually started with $25,000 provided by theater magnate Lee Shubert, former U.S. Representative Joseph L. Rhinock, and others. And rather than being made in secret, the film actually had a large cast and expensive shooting locations in two states, while Laemmle supported the film because the public's intense interest in white slavery promised substantial profits.

The film is notable for its pioneering use of camera movement while shooting scenes. Most films made prior to 1913 relied heavily on scenes shot head-on with a stationary camera. Some filmmakers had been moving, tilting or panning their cameras to track a moving object or follow action. For example, Harold M. Shaw panned his camera during one of the final moments of The Land Beyond the Sunset (1912) while Alice Guy-Blaché mounted a camera on the back of a moving truck in Matrimony's Speed Limit (1913). What made Henry Alder Leach's cinematography so groundbreaking is how he deliberately choreographed his camera movements to convey meaning and anticipate action—a technique that predicted the future of film-making.

== Release ==
Traffic in Souls opened on November 24, 1913, at Lou Fields's Theatre at 1215 Broadway in New York City. The film was made for $5,700, and reportedly earned $400,000 during its theatrical run, helping to make Universal a major player among movie studios.

=== Home media ===
Traffic in Souls was released on VHS by Kino International accompanied by a piano score by Philip Carli in 1994. Flicker Alley released the film, along with The Italian (1915) and three shorts, as part of a two DVD set entitled Perils of the New Land in August 2008. Film historian Shelley Stamp provided expert audio commentary for the 2008 release.

== Reception ==
Author and film critic Leonard Maltin awarded the film two and a half out of four stars, calling it "a trashy, corny guilty pleasure."
