= Vanity Fair (1922 film) =

1922 British drama film

- Directed by: Walter Courtney Rowden
- Written by: Walter Courtney Rowden
- Based on: Vanity Fair; 1848 novel by William Makepeace Thackeray
- Produced by: H.B. Parkinson
- Starring: Clive Brook; Cosmo Kyrle Bellew; Douglas Munro
- Cinematography: T.R. Thumwood
- Production company: Master Films
- Distributed by: British Exhibitors' Films
- Release date: 1922
- Country: United Kingdom
- Language: English

Vanity Fair is a 1922 British silent drama film directed by Walter Courtney Rowden and starring Clive Brook, Cosmo Kyrle Bellew and Douglas Munro. An adaptation of the 1848 novel Vanity Fair by William Makepeace Thackeray, it was made as part of the "Tense Moments with Great Authors Series" of films.

== Partial cast ==
- Clive Brook - Rawdon Crawley
- Douglas Munro - Marquis of Staines
- Henry Doughty - Mr. Wenham
- Kyrle Bellew - Becky Sharp
