= The Mother of Dartmoor =

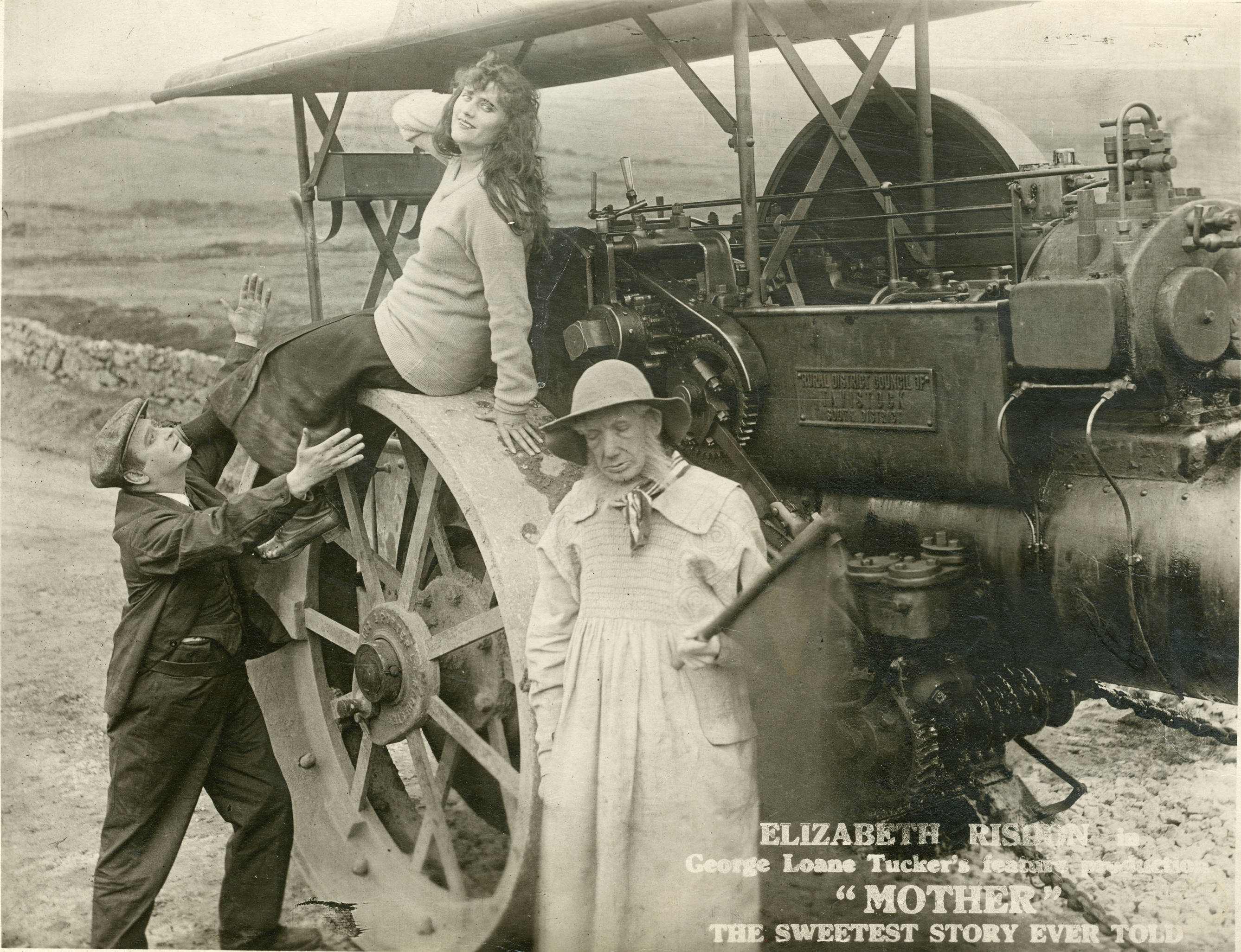
- Directed by: George Loane Tucker
- Written by: Eden Phillpotts (novel); Kenelm Foss
- Starring: Elisabeth Risdon; Bertram Burleigh; George Bellamy; Sydney Fairbrother
- Production company: London Film Company
- Distributed by: {{ubl[Jury Films|First National Pictures (US)}}
- Release date: October 1916
- Country: United Kingdom
- Languages: Silent; English intertitles

The Mother of Dartmoor is a 1916 British silent drama film directed by George Loane Tucker and starring Elisabeth Risdon, Bertram Burleigh and Enid Bell.

== Plot summary ==
A mother testifies against her own poacher son and he is sent to prison.

== Cast ==
- Elisabeth Risdon as Avesa Pomeroy
- Bertram Burleigh as Ives Pomeroy
- Enid Bell as Jill Wicket
- George Bellamy as Matthew Northmore
- Sydney Fairbrother as Mrs. Bolt
- Frank Stanmore as Sammy Bolt
- Hubert Willis as Moleskin

== Bibliography ==
- Goble, Alan. The Complete Index to Literary Sources in Film. Walter de Gruyter, 1999.
