= Edward O'Neill (actor) =

British actor (1862–1938)

Edward O'Neill (12 October 1862 – 20 August 1938) was a British actor.

He was born Edward Alfred Morse Becher in Solapur, British Raj and died at age 75 in Twickenham, Middlesex, England, UK.

== Selected filmography ==
- Henry VIII (1911)
- The Ring and the Rajah (1914)
- The King's Daughter (1916)
- A Fair Impostor (1916)
- The Manxman (1916)
- Sally in Our Alley (1916)
- Vice Versa (1916)
- Justice (1917)
- Everybody's Business (1917)
- A Fortune at Stake (1918)
- The Great Impostor (1918)
- The Wages of Sin (1918)
- Her Heritage (1919)
- Darby and Joan (1920)
- Duke's Son (1920)
- Enchantment (1920)
- The Mirage (1920)
- The Barton Mystery (1920)
- General John Regan (1921)
- Innocent (1921)
- Guy Fawkes (1923)
- One Arabian Night (1923)
- The Scandal (1923)
- Don Quixote (1923)
- The Sins Ye Do (1924)
- Not for Sale (1924)
- The Conspirators (1924)
- A Romance of Mayfair (1925)
- Sahara Love (1926)
- The Flight Commander (1927)
- Boadicea (1927)
- Dawn (1928)
- A Daughter in Revolt (1928)
- Chick (1928)
- Lily of Killarney (1929)
- Alf's Carpet (1929)
- The Bondman (1929)
