= The Game of Liberty (novel) =

1915 novel

- First edition
- Author: E. Phillips Oppenheim
- Language: English
- Publisher: Cassell & Company
- Publication date: 1915
- Publication place: United Kingdom
- Media type: Print
- Pages: 313

The Game of Liberty (U.S. title An Amiable Charlatan) is a 1915 novel by the British writer E. Phillips Oppenheim in which an aristocrat's son falls in love with a female thief.

== Adaptation ==
In 1916 the book was turned into a silent film The Game of Liberty directed by George Loane Tucker.

== Bibliography ==
- Goble, Alan. The Complete Index to Literary Sources in Film. Walter de Gruyter, 1999.
