= Judge Not (1920 film) =

1920 film

- Directed by: Einar Bruun
- Written by: Holger-Madsen
- Starring: Fay Compton; Fred Groves; Eric Barclay
- Production company: London Film Company
- Distributed by: Jury Films
- Release date: May 1920
- Country: United Kingdom
- Languages: Silent; English intertitles

Judge Not is a 1920 British silent drama film directed by Einar Bruun and starring Fay Compton, Fred Groves and Eric Barclay.

== Cast ==
- Fay Compton as Nelly
- Fred Groves as Burke
- Chappell Dossett as Frank Raymond
- Eric Barclay as Billy
- Frank Stanmore
- Mary Brough
- Henry Vibart
- George Bellamy
- Wallace Bosco
- Christine Silver

== Bibliography ==
- Palmer Scott. British Film Actors' Credits, 1895-1987. McFarland, 1988.
