= The Third String (1914 film) =

- Directed by: George Loane Tucker
- Starring: June Gail; Frank Stanmore; George Bellamy
- Production company: London Film Company
- Distributed by: Fenning Films
- Release date: February 1914
- Country: United Kingdom
- Languages: Silent; English intertitles

The Third String is a 1914 British silent sports comedy film directed by George Loane Tucker and starring June Gail, Frank Stanmore and George Bellamy. The film is based on a short story of the same name by W.W. Jacobs, which was later turned into a 1932 film.

== Premise ==
A man poses as a boxer to impress a barmaid, but this leads to him being forced to fight a champion.

== Cast ==
- June Gail as Julia
- Frank Stanmore as Ginger Dick
- George Bellamy as Peter Russett
- Judd Green as Sam Small
- Charles Rock as Landlord
- Charles E. Vernon as Bill Lumm

== See also ==
- List of boxing films

== Bibliography ==
- Goble, Alan. The Complete Index to Literary Sources in Film. Walter de Gruyter, 1999.
