= The Manxman (novel) =

1894 novel by Hall Caine

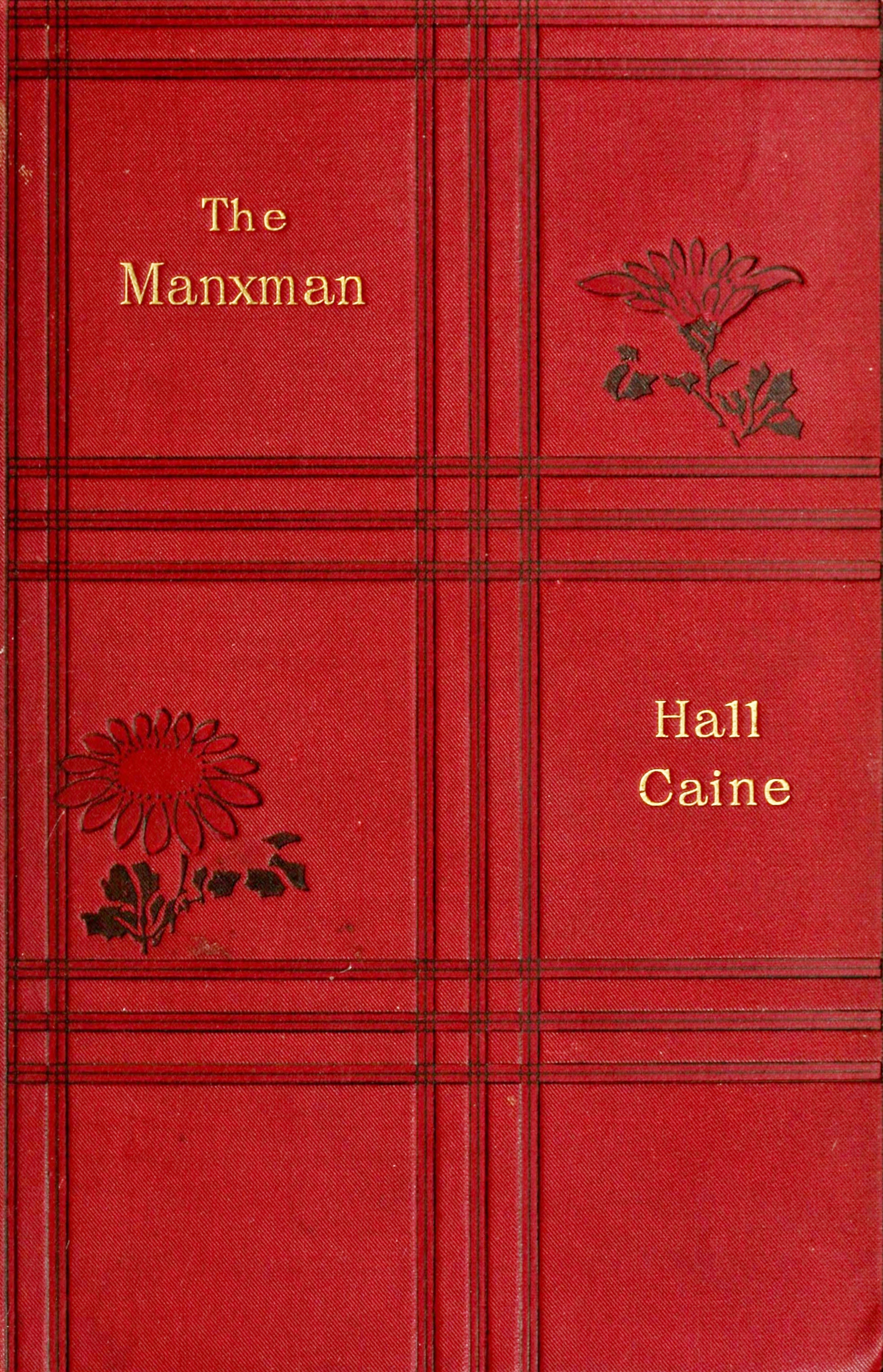
- First edition cover
- Author: Hall Caine
- Language: English
- Publisher: Heinemann
- Publication date: 3 August 1894
- Publication place: England
- Media type: Print (hardcover)
- Pages: 439 pp (first edition)

The Manxman is a novel by Hall Caine, first appearing as a serial in The Queen, The Lady's Newspaper and Court Chronicle between January and July 1894. Published as one volume in August 1894 by Heinemann, The Manxman ended the system of three-volume novels. A highly popular novel of its period, it was set in the Isle of Man and concerned a romantic triangle. The novel has as its central themes, the mounting consequences of sin and the saving grace of simple human goodness.

== Plot summary ==
Part I
The novel concerns the love triangle between Kate Cregeen and the two good friends and cousins, the illegitimate, poorly educated but good-hearted Peter Quilliam, and the well-educated and cultured Philip Christian. Kate's father rejects Pete's request to marry his daughter, due to his low prospects, and so Pete sets off to Kimberly, South Africa, to earn his fortune. He leaves Philip in charge of looking after Kate in his absence.

Part II
As Kate matures into an adult woman and Philip rises to become the foremost young lawyer in the island, they begin to fall in love. This is first openly spoken of between them when they hear rumours that Pete has died in Africa. However, the course of their love is still not open as Philip has to choose between worldly success and the position as Deemster, or his love of the lower class Kate. Feeling this push them apart, Kate "is driven to an effort to hold on to the man whom life is tearing away from her by making a mistaken appeal to his love."

Part III
Pete returns to the island with a fortune fit to have his marriage proposal accepted by Kate's parents, while Kate is bed-ridden recovering from an illness brought about by Philip's breaking with her to stay true to his promise to Pete. Remaining unaware of anything between Philip and Kate, Pete arranges for the wedding, which Kate goes through with in a confused daze.

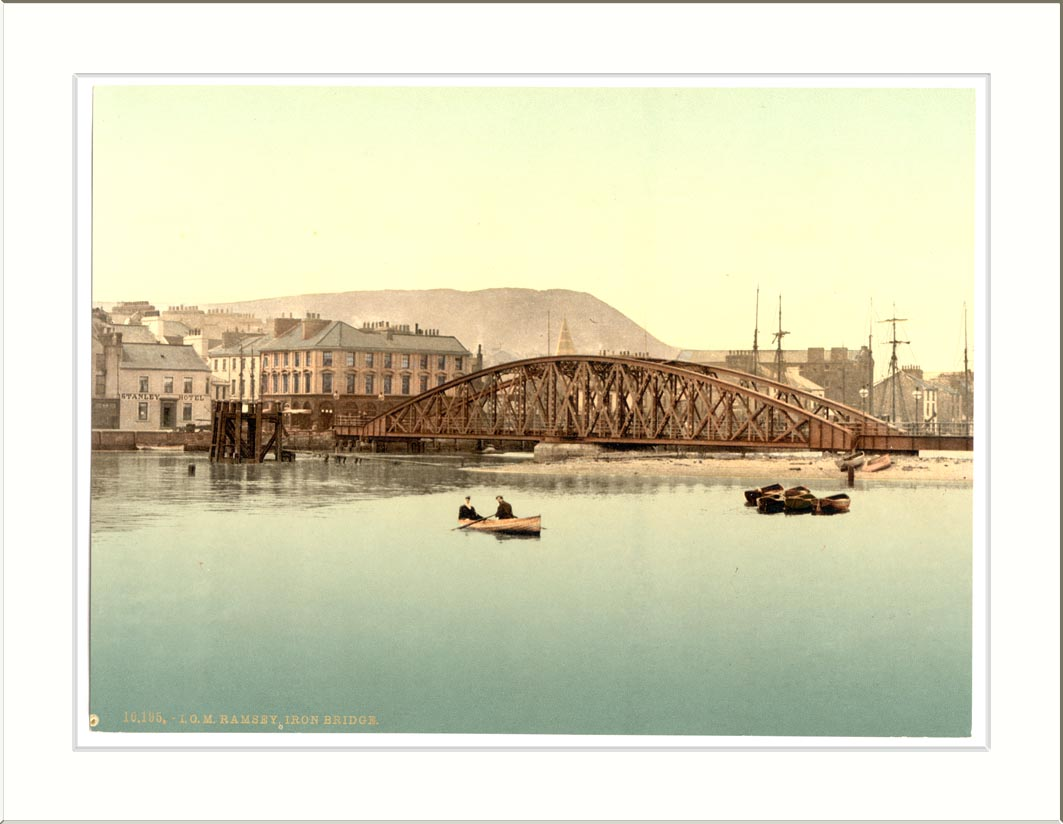
Ramsey harbour not long after the time that Hall Caine wrote The Manxman

Part IV
Kate gives birth to a daughter which she realises is Philip’s. This fact, along with the reason for Kate's displeasure at the marriage, remains hidden to Pete, who proves himself to be a good and doting husband. When Kate informs Philip of the paternity of the baby girl, they arrange for her to live with him in secret. She leaves Pete's house to go to Philip on the evening when Pete is at the head of the crowd honouring Philip on his return to Ramsey, having been made Deemster.

Part V
Heart-broken at the disappearance of Kate, Pete looks to keep her memory in honour by pretending that she has gone to Liverpool to stay with a fictional uncle. To maintain this lie against the gossip of the town, Pete multiplies his lies in beginning to fake a written correspondence between Kate and himself. As Philip watches his friend's pathetic pretence, he feels the weight of his deceit, which causes him to take to drink and to pull away from Kate who has been secretly installed in his house. This situation continues until Kate leaves Philip so that he is relieved of his wretched situation.

Part VI
With Pete's fortune used up, his deception with the letters is found out and Kate is universally thought of as a fallen woman by everyone but Pete. Meanwhile, the child falls sick, the news of which reaches Kate where she had fled, in London. She returns to see the child where she again meets Pete before throwing herself into the harbour, attempting to end her shameful life. However, she is saved and immediately brought before the Deemster, Philip, to be tried. Philip realises who she is as he commits her to the prison in Castletown, and then faints. Whilst still in a swoon he is taken to Pete's house, where Pete hears Philip's feverish and unconscious confessions. However, instead of wreaking vengeance on Philip and Kate, Pete "realises that he alone is the person in the way, and therefore wipes himself out in order that the woman he loves may be happy." So Pete determines to leave the island again, divorcing Kate before he goes and leaving Philip with the child and his best wishes. Philip then overcomes his final temptation, to take up the position of Governor, and confesses everything publicly and so unburdens himself. The final scene sees him retrieving Kate from prison to start life afresh.

== Style ==
The novel is notable for its regular use of Manx dialect in speech. Peter Quilliam and the majority of the smaller characters in the novel speak in a colloquial manner unique to the Isle of Man, rendered truthfully in the novel through unusual spellings, unusual grammatical structure and even occasional Manx Gaelic words and phrases (all of which are explained in the text). An example of such a section of dialogue is as follows:

"Is it wanting to get done with me, you are, Pete?" she said in a quavering voice. "There’s my black – I can sell it for something – it’s never been wore at me since I sat through the service."

== Reception ==
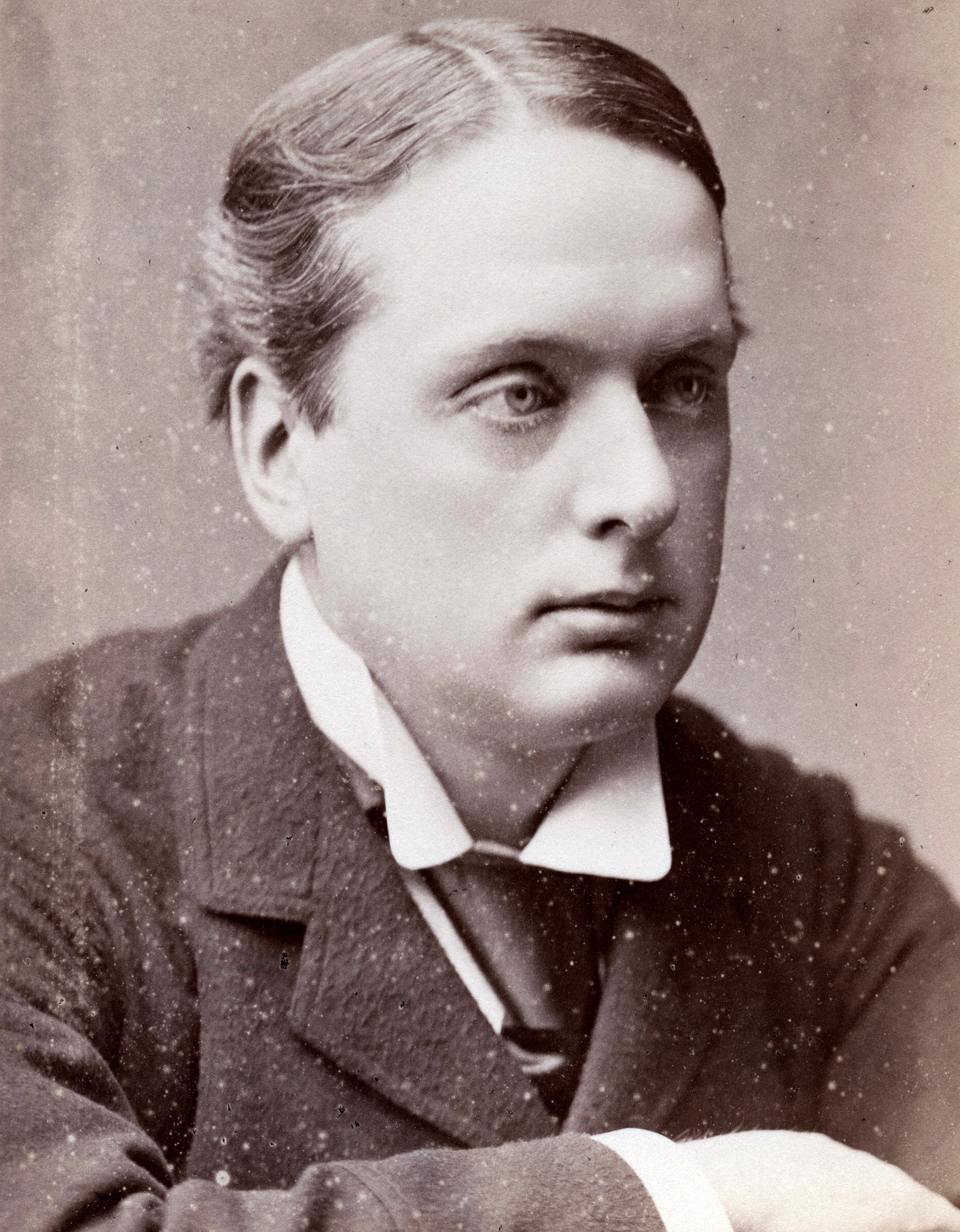
The Prime Minister, Lord Rosebery, who observed of the novel that "It will rank with the great works of English literature".

The Manxman was one of Hall Caine's greatest successes, selling over half a million copies by 1913 and being translated into twelve languages. It was also the fourth-best selling book in the United States in 1895.

It was well received by critics and the public figures of the day. The Editor of The Scotsman called it "the most powerful story that has been written in the present generation. It is a work of genius." T. P. O'Connor wrote that "The author of The Manxman belongs to the great elect of literature." This view was also shared by the Prime Minister, Lord Rosebery, who observed of the novel that "It will rank with the great works of English literature". It helped to establish the Isle of Man as one of the literary landscapes of Britain. Another contemporary of Caine's, the fellow novelist George Gissing however, thought it "very poor".

The novel created something of a sensation on the Isle of Man, though opinions on it were generally of outrage due to its apparent "coarseness." This reception was enjoyed by Caine's friend, the Manx national poet, T. E. Brown, as can be seen in his letters:

“The island is all in a shiver about Hall Caine. 'Worse than Tess!' so they say. Ladies can't admit that they read The Manxman.”

"Take The Manxman as a rapture, not a reality. It is not Manx or anything else that 'savours of the realty.' As well ask for a map of Prospero's Isle as a picture of the Isle of Man from The Manxman. Don't bother about that. Surrender yourself to the hurly-burly of splendour and get carried away, God knows where! [...] The dear old Manx folk are terribly puzzled, many of them quite outraged. 'Local colour' is knocked to smithereens (glorious smithereens!), anachronism runs riot [...]. Read and enjoy.”

== Adaptations ==
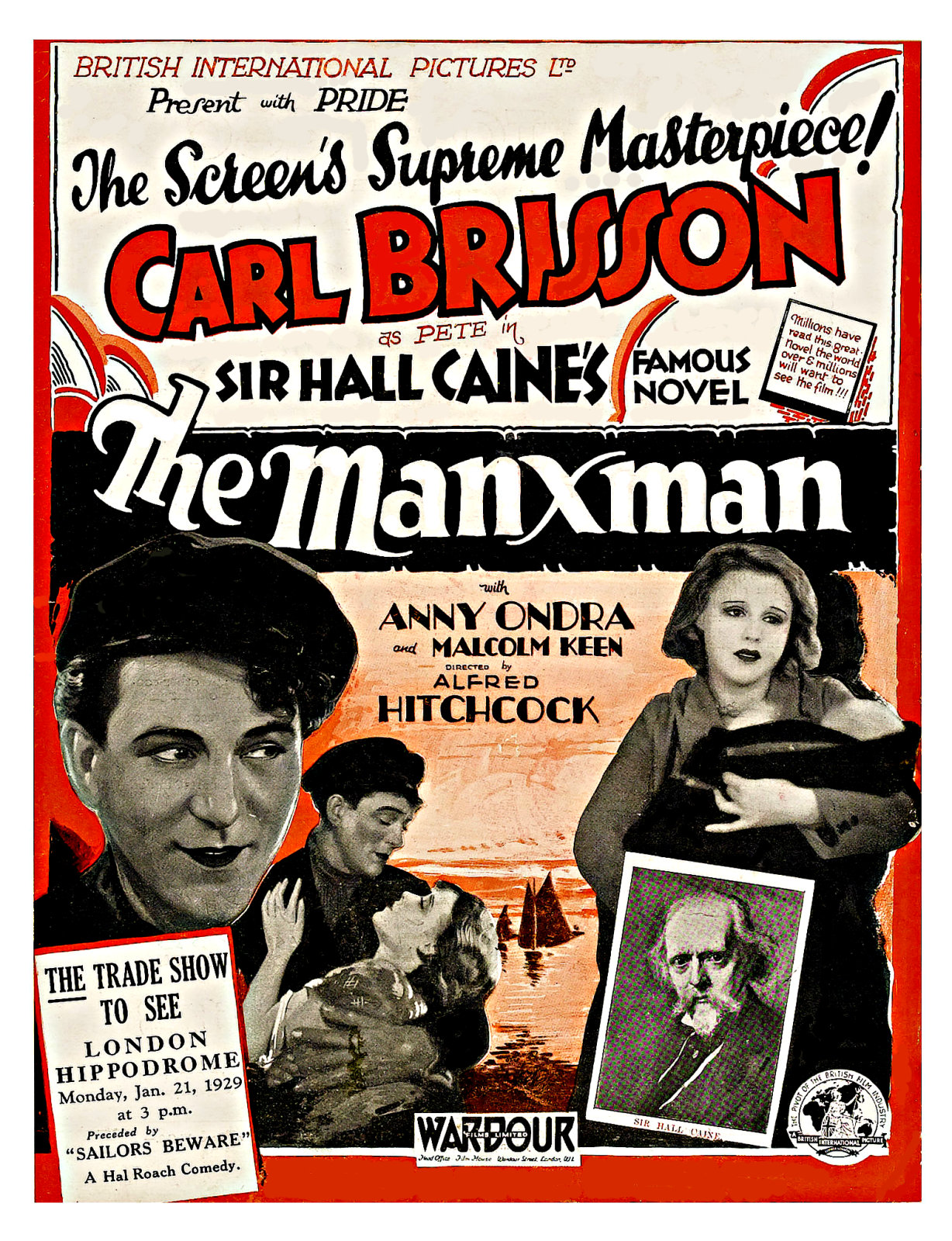
Advertising poster for the 1929 film adaption by Alfred Hitchcock

The novel was adapted twice for the stage. The initial play, written by Wilson Barrett with the title The Manxman, saw its first performance in the Grand Theatre, Leeds, on 22 August 1894, only three weeks after the publication of the book. After a regional tour, the play opened in the Shaftesbury Theatre in London with Lewis Walker in the lead role. However, it was so poorly received by the public and critics alike that it only last 13 performances. On 5 March 1898 Wilson Barrett, Maud Jeffries along with their London company opened the play in Her Majesty's Theatre, Sydney, Australia.

After a correspondence with George Bernard Shaw, Hall Caine himself then wrote a second version of the play in collaboration with Louis N. Parker. This version of the play, entitled Pete: A Drama in Four Acts featured Parker and his wife in the lead roles and proved to be a popular success.

In Australia Maud Williamson dramatised the novel as A Woman's Sin.

The novel had two eponymous silent film adaptations. In 1916, George Loane Tucker directed the first version and in 1929 Alfred Hitchcock made the hit remake, his last fully silent film.

== Locations in the novel ==
The principle locations in the novel include the following:

- Ramsey – The location of Pete and Kate's house, Philip's family home (in Ballure, which was considered to be distinct from Ramsey at the time of the novel), and most of the later action of the novel.
- Sulby – The location of the parental home of Kate, and most of early action in the novel.
- Douglas – The location of Philip's home in which he lives in secret with Kate (in Athol Street).
- Peel – The location of various scenes concerning Pete and his time as a sailor.
- Tynwald – The location of the confrontation between the sailors and the Governor, adjudicated by Philip (in Part V of the novel)
- Castletown – The location of Kate's incarceration, and Philip's final confession in the courthouse.

== Bibliography ==
- Allen, Vivien. Hall Caine: portrait of a Victorian romancer. Sheffield Academic Press, 1997.
- Stark, Susanne. The novel in Anglo-German context: Cultural Cross-Currents and Affinities.
- Yacowar, Maurice & Grant, Barry Keith. Hitchcock's British Films. Wayne State University Press, 2010.
