= Lettice Fairfax =

English actress (1876–1948)

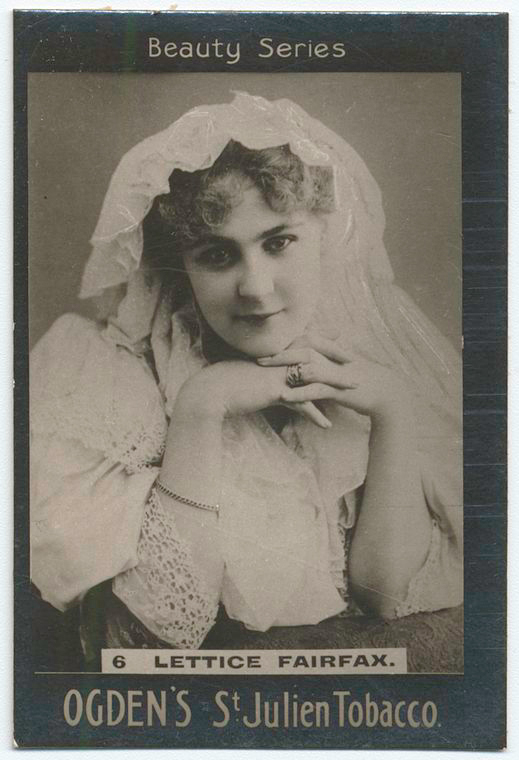
- Lettice Fairfax in a postcard
- Born: 26 March 1876; England
- Died: 25 December 1948 (aged 72); Somerset, England
- Burial place: Wells Cathedral
- Occupation: Actress
- Spouse: Compton Mackenzie 1896-1898 Children 1 Lettice jr Compton-Mackenzie. C. H. Biddulph Pinchard (m. 1908; died 1944) 1John Biddulph Pinchard

Alice Lilian Robbins "Lettice" Fairfax (26 March 1876 – 25 December 1948) was an English stage and silent film actress. She is known for her roles in the Edwardian musical comedy An Artist's Model (1895) and in silent cinema such as Brother Officers as Baroness Honour Royden (1915).

== Biography ==
Lettice Fairfax was born on 26 March 1876.

She married Major C. H. Biddulph Pinchard in 1908. He died in May 1944.

She died in Somerset on 25 December 1948, and was buried at Wells Cathedral.

== Plays ==
- Auld lang sine (1892)
- Don Juan (1893)
- An Artist's Model (1895)
- Josiah's Dream; or, The Woman of the Future (1895)
- The Muff of the Regiment (1896)
- When the Cat's Away (1896)
- The First Violin as May Wedderhorn (1898)
- Captain Swift (1899 and 1906)
- The First Night (1899)
- Facing the music (1900)
- Rip Van Winkle (1900)
- The Price of Peace (1900)
- The Queen's Double (1901)
- Beau Austin (1901)
- Beaucaire (1901-1902)
- Sporting Simpson (1902)
- Milky White (1902)
- Lyre and Lancet (1902)
- Brown at Brighton (1902)
- Mrs. Gorringe's Necklace (1903-1904)
- My Lady of Roselade (1904)
- The Money Makers (1904)
- A Wife without a Smile (1904)
- Mollentrave on Women (1905)
- Alice Sit-by-the-Fire: A Page from a Daughter's Diary (1905)
- Oliver Twist (1905)
- Beside the Bonnie Brier Bush (1905)
- As You Like It (1906)
- Raffles, The Amateur Cracksman (1906)
- The Education of Elizabeth (1907)
- The Walk (1908)
- A Lady calls on Peter (1921)
- Me and My Diary (1922)
- The Green Cord (1922)
- The Rakshashi (1925)

== Filmography ==
- Brother Officers as Baroness Honour Royden (1915)
- The Glorious Adventure as Court Lady (uncredited) (1922)
