= The Duchess of Seven Dials =

1920 British film by Fred Paul

- Directed by: Fred Paul
- Starring: Cecil Mannering, Marjorie Hume, Adelaide Grace
- Release date: 1920
- Country: United Kingdom
- Language: Silent

The Duchess of Seven Dials is a 1920 British silent romance film directed by Fred Paul and starring Cecil Mannering, Marjorie Hume and Adelaide Grace. Its plot involves a young aristocratic woman who falls in love with a curate doing charitable work in the Seven Dials area of Central London. It was made by the London Film Company.

== Cast ==
- Cecil Mannering as Reverend Moel Fortescue
- Marjorie Hume as Lady Irene Worth
- Adelaide Grace as Grace Milton
- Daphne Grey as Melia
- Teddy Arundell as Joe Murden
- Henry Paulo as Duke of Fivepence
- George Turner as Spivy
- Hubert Willis as Lord Sloane
- Cyril Percival as Lord Marcus
- Daisy Elliston
