= Walter Courtney Rowden =

Walter Courtney Rowden was a British screenwriter and film director. He is sometimes referred to as William Courtney Rowden. He was known for Corinthian Jack (1921), Daniel Deronda (1921), Simple Simon (1922), and Vanity Fair (1922). His other credits include The Prisoner of Zenda (1915), At Trinity Church I Met My Doom (1922), and Hornet's Nest (1923).

== Selected filmography ==
Screenwriter

- The Prisoner of Zenda (1915)
- Rupert of Hentzau (1915)
- Westward Ho! (1919)
- Hobson's Choice (1920)
- Calvary (1920)
- The Sheik (1922)
- Hornet's Nest (1923)

Director

- Daniel Deronda (1921)
- Corinthian Jack (1921)
- Vanity Fair (1922)
- A Tale of Two Cities (1922)

== Bibliography ==
- Scott, Ian. From Pinewood to Hollywood: British Filmmakers in American Cinema, 1910-1969. Palgrave MacMillan, 2010.
