= Douglas Munro (actor) =

English actor (1866–1924)

Douglas Munro (1866 in London – 27 January 1924 in Birmingham, Warwickshire) was an English actor.

== Selected filmography ==
- Liberty Hall (1914)
- The MiddleMan (1915)
- The Christian (1915)
- Arsène Lupin (1916)
- The Hypocrites (1916)
- The Game of Liberty (1916)
- Vice Versa (1916)
- Dombey and Son (1917)
- The Top Dog (1918)
- The Life Story of David Lloyd George (1918, suppressed until 1996)
- The Garden of Resurrection (1919)
- General Post (1920)
- Darby and Joan (1920)
- Duke's Son (1920)
- Testimony (1920)
- London Pride (1920)
- The Lure of Crooning Water (1920)
- A Temporary Vagabond (1920)
- The Mirage (1920)
- The Bigamist (1921)
- The Sport of Kings (1921)
- Vanity Fair (1922)
- Dicky Monteith (1922)
- A Sporting Double (1922)
- The Grass Orphan (1922)
- A Romance of Old Baghdad (1922)
- Fires of Fate (1923)
- Tons of Money (1924)
- The Desert Sheik (1924)
