= Quinneys (play) =

Quinneys is a comedy-drama play by the British writer Horace Annesley Vachell, which was first staged in 1914. It was a major hit on its release and went on to become one of the author's most successful plays. However, despite its popularity in London the play met with a lukewarm reception when it opened in New York City in 1915. It focuses on Joseph Quinney the endearing but stubborn head of a family firm of antiques dealers whose firm views cause problems for his relatives and friends.

The play's success led Vachell to write a series of novels following on the adventures of the family.

== Film adaptations ==
The play was twice turned into silents films. Quinneys (1919) directed by Herbert Brenon and Quinneys (1927) directed by Maurice Elvey.
In 1948 the BBC produced a 90-minute television adaptation.

== Bibliography ==
- Bordman, Gerald. American Theatre: A Chronicle of Comedy and Drama 1914-1930. Oxford University Press, 1996.
- Cohen, Deborah. Household Gods: The British And Their Possessions. Yale University Press, 2006.
