= Vice Versa (1916 film) =

1916 film by Maurice Elvey

Vice Versa is a 1916 British silent fantasy and comedy film directed by Maurice Elvey and starring Charles Rock, Douglas Munro and Guy Newall. It is an adaptation of the 1882 novel Vice Versa by Thomas Anstey Guthrie. The screenplay concerns a schoolboy who magically swaps places with his pompous father.

== Cast ==
- Charles Rock – Paul Bultitude
- Douglas Munro – Marmaduke Paradine
- Guy Newall – Dick Bultitude
- Edward O'Neill – Doctor Grimstone
