= Bitter Fruit (1920 film) =

1920 film

- Directed by: Will H. Bradley
- Written by: Will Bradley
- Cinematography: Harry W. Smith
- Production company: Dramafilms
- Distributed by: Arrow Film Corp.
- Release date: 1920
- Running time: 6 reels
- Country: United States
- Language: Silent (English intertitles)

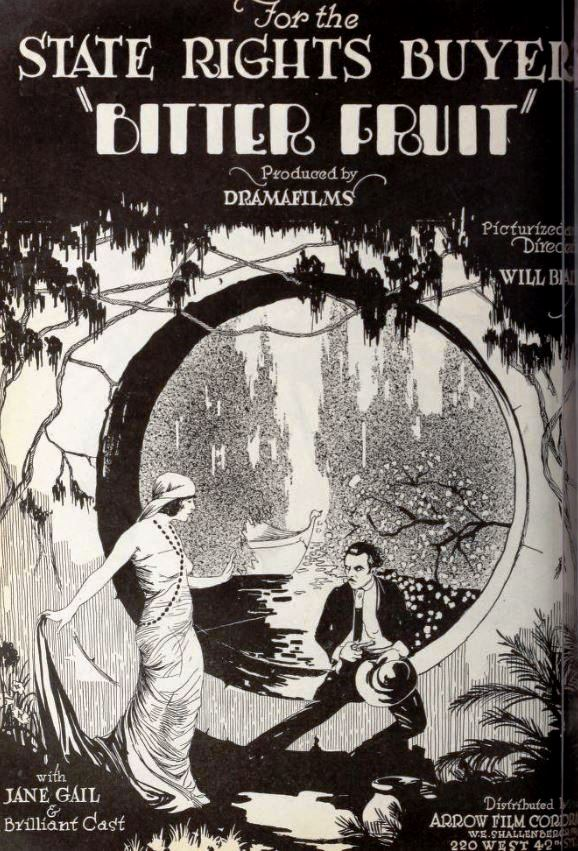
Bitter Fruit advertisement

Bitter Fruit is a 1920 American silent drama film directed by Will H. Bradley and starring Jane Gail.

== Cast ==
- Jane Gail as Rose Arnold
- John Charles as Gaspard
- Ruth Pecheur
- Charles Gotthold
- Wallace Ray
- Buck Connors (credited as George Connor)
- Marie Pecheur

== Production ==
Bitter Fruit was originally produced under the working title "The Black Lagoon," and filmed in the Florida Everglades.
