= Jane Gail =

American actress (1890–1963)

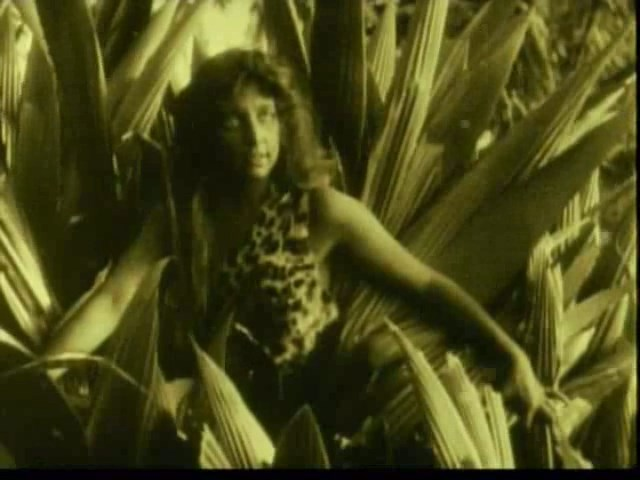
- Jane Gail in 20,000 Leagues Under the Sea (1916)
- Born: Ethel S. Magee; August 16, 1890; Salem, New York, U.S.
- Died: January 30, 1963 (aged 72); St. Petersburg, Florida, U.S.
- Occupation: Actress
- Years active: 1909–1920
- Spouse: Edwin C. Hill (m. 1922; died 1957)

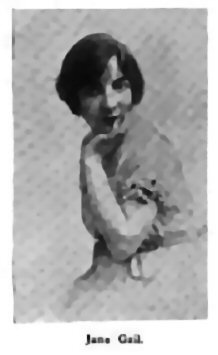
The Moving Picture World, November 22, 1913

Jane Gail (August 16, 1890 – January 30, 1963), born Ethel S. Magee in Salem, New York, was an early American silent movie and stage actress.

== Biography ==
Gail is best remembered for her role in the silent film Traffic in Souls (1913), and the adaptations of Dr. Jekyll and Mr. Hyde (1913), where she gained worldwide fame as Dr. Jekyll's (King Baggot) imperiled fiancée. She also appeared in the 1912 version of Jekyll and Hyde, but as an extra.

A veteran of 19 film appearances between 1912 and 1920, Gail first got her acting start on the Broadway stage, appearing in two productions, The Rack and The City. She was only 30 years old when she made her last film, Bitter Fruit (1920). She never appeared on the silver screen after that. Gail died in St. Petersburg, Florida, on January 30, 1963. She was 72 years old.

== Partial filmography ==
- Dr. Jekyll and Mr. Hyde (1912)
- Twixt Love and Ambition (1912)
- Dr. Jekyll and Mr. Hyde (1913)
- Traffic in Souls (1913)
- Gold Is Not All (1913) as The Girl
- Called Back (1914)
- The Difficult Way (1914)
- The Black Spot (1914)
- She Stoops to Conquer (1914)
- The MiddleMan (1915)
- The Prisoner of Zenda (1915)
- Rupert of Hentzau (1915)
- 20,000 Leagues Under the Sea (1916)
