= Chester Sanders Lord =

American journalist

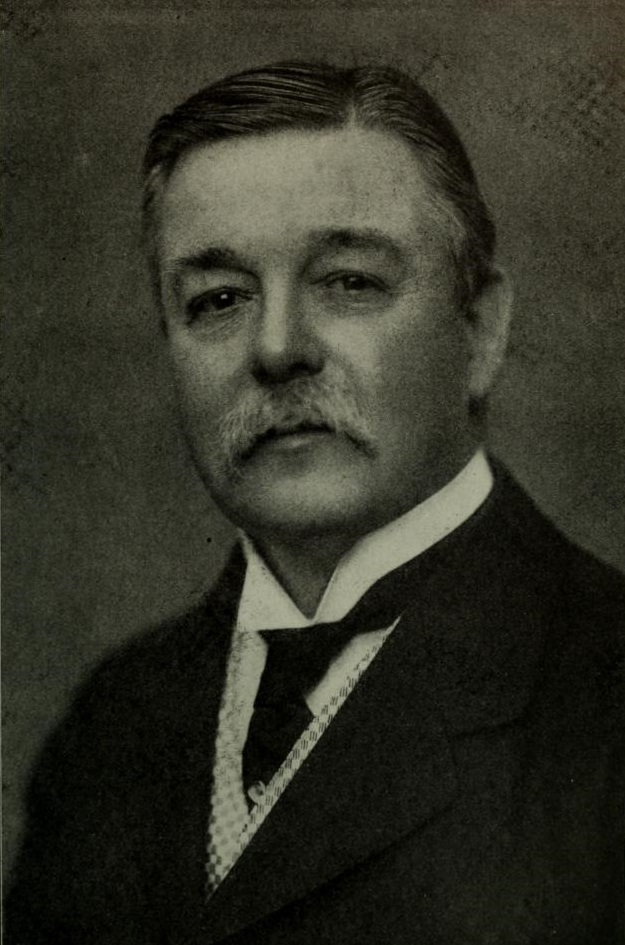
Portrait of Chester Sanders Lord.

Chester Sanders Lord (18 March 1850, Romulus, New York – 1 August 1933) was an American journalist.

He studied at Hamilton College, was for a time associate editor of the Oswego (New York) Advertiser, and in 1872 became a member of the staff of the New York Sun, and of which he was managing editor from 1880 to 1913, when he retired from business. He was regent of the University of the State of New York 1897–1904, and was reelected regent in 1909 for the term ending in 1922.
