= The Game of Liberty (film) =

1916 film directed by George Loane Tucker

- Directed by: George Loane Tucker
- Based on: The Game of Liberty by E. Phillips Oppenheim
- Starring: Gerald Ames; Douglas Munro; Laura Cowie
- Production company: London Film Company
- Distributed by: Jury Films
- Release date: January 1916
- Country: United Kingdom
- Languages: Silent; English intertitles

The Game of Liberty is a 1916 British silent comedy crime film directed by George Loane Tucker and starring Gerald Ames, Douglas Munro and Laura Cowie. It is also known by the alternative title of Under Suspicion. It was based on the 1915 novel of the same title by E. Phillips Oppenheim.

== Cast ==
- Gerald Ames as Hon. Paul Walmsley
- Douglas Munro as Joseph H. Parker
- Laura Cowie as Eva Parker
- Bert Wynne as Inspector Cullen
- Sydney Fairbrother as Mrs. Bundercombe
- Hugh Croise as Bert Johnson

== Bibliography ==
- Goble, Alan. The Complete Index to Literary Sources in Film. Walter de Gruyter, 1999.
