= Henry Ainley =

English actor (1879–1945)

- In Paolo and Francesca, 1902
- Born: Henry Hinchliffe Ainley; 21 August 1879; Morley, West Yorkshire, England
- Died: 31 October 1945 (aged 66); London, England
- Years active: 1900–1936
- Spouses: Suzanne Sheldon; Elaine Fearon; Bettina Riddle, later Baroness von Hutten zum Stolzenberg
- Children: At least 6, including Richard and Anthony

Henry Hinchliffe Ainley (21 August 1879 – 31 October 1945) was an English actor.

== Life and career ==
=== Early years ===
Ainley was born in Morley, near Leeds, on 21 August 1879, the only son and eldest child of Richard Ainley (1851–1919), a textile worker, and his wife, Ada née Hinchliffe (1850–1928). After education at the church school of St Peter's, Morley, Ainley became a bank clerk in Sheffield, where he took part in amateur dramatics. When the actor-manager George Alexander was on tour in 1899 in H. A. Jones's play The Masqueraders, Ainley obtained his permission to "walk on" (i.e. appear as a non-speaking extra). He made his professional stage début in F. R. Benson's company as a messenger in Macbeth. He remained with Benson for two years, making his London début at the Lyceum Theatre as the Duke of Gloster to Benson's king in Henry V, in a cast that also featured Constance Benson, Leslie Faber, Harcourt Williams, Charles Doran and Oscar Asche.

In 1902 Alexander saw Ainley in Benson's production of The Merchant of Venice and engaged him for the juvenile lead role of Paolo in Stephen Phillips's Paolo and Francesca at the St James's Theatre; this propelled him to stardom.

=== Shakespearean roles ===
After his first Shakespeare roles Ainley returned to Leeds to play at the Grand Theatre. Later roles included Oliver Cromwell, Mark Antony in Julius Caesar and Macbeth himself. He played Malvolio (1912) and Leontes under the direction of Granville-Barker and portrayed Hamlet several times, including a 1930 production that was chosen for a Royal Command Performance.

John Gielgud held Ainley in high regard and fulfilled a longstanding ambition to perform with him when Gielgud played Iago opposite Ainley's Othello in a 1932 BBC Radio broadcast. But he described Ainley's Prospero as "disastrous", writing in the Sunday Times in 1996.

=== Other roles ===
Publicity shot showing Ainley and Eileen Sharp in the original 1925 cast of The Moon and Sixpence.

Ainley played Robert Waring in The Shulamite at the Savoy Theatre in London in 1906. He played Joseph Quinney in Quinneys on stage in 1915 and on film in 1919. In 1921 he created the role of John Beal in the original production of Lord Dunsany's If at the Ambassadors Theatre. He appeared in A. A. Milne's The Dover Road opposite Athene Seyler in 1922 and as the Bishop of Chelsea in Bernard Shaw's Getting Married at the Haymarket Theatre. In 1929, he played James Fraser in St. John Ervine's The First Mrs. Fraser, a role he reprised for the film version in 1932. He also starred in stage and radio productions of James Elroy Flecker's Hassan.

=== Behind the scenes ===
In 1921, Ainley became a member of the council of the Royal Academy of Dramatic Arts and served as its president from 1931 to 1933.

In 1932, Ainley was part of the effort to save the debt-laden Sadler's Wells theatre. According to a report in The Times dated 15 March 1932, Ainley considered Sadler's Wells stalwart Samuel Phelps the "greatest actor of all" and Sir Johnston Forbes-Robertson "the greatest of Hamlets".

== Personal life ==
He was married three times – to Susanne Sheldon, Elaine Fearon and the novelist Bettina Riddle, who was known as the Baroness von Hutten zum Stolzenberg. He had several children (although the published obituaries in The Times and The Stage disagree as to the precise numbers) which include the actors Henry T. Ainley, Richard Ainley, Anthony Ainley and Patsy Ainley. He was also the father of Henrietta Riddle who was briefly engaged to Alistair Cooke in 1932.

Fifteen letters in the possession of Laurence Olivier's widow Joan Plowright suggest that Ainley may have had a sexual relationship with the younger actor in the late 1930s. The letters – said by Olivier's biographer Terry Coleman to be explicitly homosexual in content – suggest that Ainley was infatuated with Olivier, even if, as some members of Olivier's family insist, notably the actor's son Tarquin Olivier, the feeling was not reciprocated.

== Recordings ==
Henry Ainley made recordings for the Gramophone Company by the acoustic method, and also later for the same company (as His Master's Voice) by electric recordings. The early acoustics were as follows:

- 1456 The Day (Chappell) (Ho1100/B393) 10"
- 1457 The Kaiser and God (Pain). 1915. 10"
- B393 The Charge of the Light Brigade (Tennyson). 10"
- C490 Why Britain is at War. (coupled with GILBERT, John Bull's budget song)
- D177 Carillon 'Chantez, Belges, chantez!' (Sing, Belgians, sing!) poem by Emile Cammaerts, declamation with orchestral music composed by Edward Elgar. (two sides) 12". 1915.

== Selected filmography ==
- She Stoops to Conquer (1914)
- Called Back (1914)
- Sweet Lavender (1915)
- The Prisoner of Zenda (1915)
- Sowing the Wind (1916)
- The Marriage of William Ashe (1916)
- The Manxman (1917)
- Quinneys (1919)
- Build Thy House (1920)
- The Prince and the Beggarmaid (1921)
- The Royal Oak (1923)
- The First Mrs. Fraser (1932)

== Sources ==
- Parker, John, ed. (1939). Who's Who in the Theatre (ninth ed.). London: Sir Isaac Pitman and Sons. OCLC 473894893.

== Bibliography ==
- "Henry Ainley".
- "Collectors' Post biography". Archived from the original on 6 February 2005.
- Littlewood, S. R. "Ainley, Henry Hinchliffe (1879–1945)". Oxford Dictionary of National Biography (online ed.). Oxford University Press. doi:10.1093/ref:odnb/30353. (Subscription, Wikipedia Library access or UK public library membership required.)
