= Gerald Ames =

Actor, director, Olympic fencer (1880–1933)

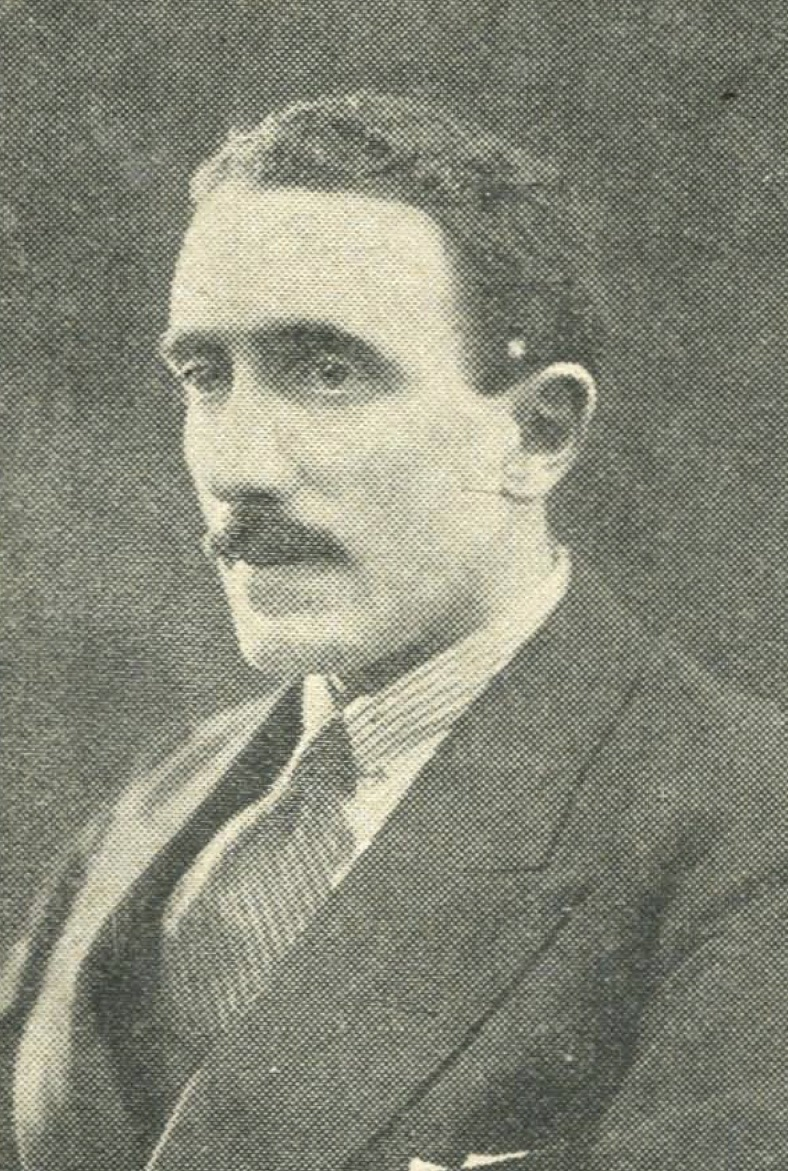
- in 1919
- Born: Percy Gerald Ames; 12 September 1880; Blackheath, London, England
- Died: 2 July 1933 (aged 52); Knightsbridge, London, England
- Years active: 1905–1928

Gerald Ames (12 September 1880 – 2 July 1933) was a British actor, film director and Olympic fencer. Ames was born in Blackheath, London in 1880 and first took up acting in 1905. He was a popular leading man in the post-First World War cinema, appearing in more than sixty films between his debut in 1914 and his retirement from the screen in 1928 in a career entirely encompassing the silent era. He was also a regular stage actor who took on many leading roles in the theatre.

He competed in the individual épée event at the 1912 Summer Olympics.

He died in 1933 after falling down the steps of Knightsbridge tube station and suffering a heart attack. He was married to the actress Mary Dibley.

== Partial filmography ==
- She Stoops to Conquer (1914)
- The Black Spot (1914)
- The Difficult Way (1914)
- The MiddleMan (1915)
- The Christian (1915)
- Love in a Wood (1915)
- The Shulamite (1915)
- The Prisoner of Zenda (1915)
- Rupert of Hentzau (1915)
- Arsène Lupin (1916)
- The Hypocrites (1916)
- The King's Daughter (1916)
- The Game of Liberty (1916)
- The Ragged Messenger (1917)
- Masks and Faces (1917)
- A Gamble for Love (1917)
- A Peep Behind the Scenes (1918)
- Boundary House (1918)
- Missing the Tide (1918)
- A Turf Conspiracy (1918)
- A Fortune at Stake (1918)
- Adam Bede (1918)
- Red Pottage (1918)
- The Irresistible Flapper (1919)
- Comradeship (1919)
- Possession (1919)
- The Forest on the Hill (1919)
- Sheba (1919)
- Sunken Rocks (1919)
- The Nature of the Beast (1919)
- Missing the Tides (1919)
- Broken in the Wars (1919)
- John Forrest Finds Himself (1920)
- Once Aboard the Lugger (1920)
- Aylwin (1920)
- Anna the Adventuress (1920)
- Alf's Button (1920)
- The Amazing Quest of Mr. Ernest Bliss (1920)
- Helen of Four Gates (1920)
- Mrs. Erricker's Reputation (1920)
- Mr. Justice Raffles (1921)
- Tansy (1921)
- Wild Heather (1921)
- The Woman Who Obeyed (1923)
- The Loves of Mary, Queen of Scots (1923)
- God's Prodigal (1923)
- A Royal Divorce (1923)
- The Little People (1926)
- The King's Highway (1927)
- The Rising Generation (1928)
- A Light Woman (1928)
