= George Bellamy (actor) =

English actor (1866–1944)

- Born: 10 July 1866; Bristol, England
- Died: 26 December 1944 (aged 78); London
- Occupation: Actor
- Years active: 1911-1933

George Bellamy (10 July 1866 – 26 December 1944) was an English film actor of the silent era. He spent eighteen years on the stage before making his film debut in Wanted - A Husband. He appeared in 70 films between 1911 and 1933. He also directed two films in 1917. He was born in Bristol, England.

== Selected filmography ==
- The Third String (1914)
- Called Back (1914)
- The MiddleMan (1915)
- The Christian (1915)
- The Prisoner of Zenda (1915)
- Rupert of Hentzau (1915)
- Honour in Pawn (1916)
- The Mother of Dartmoor (1916)
- The Answer (1916)
- Auld Lang Syne (1917)
- The Tiger Woman (1917 - directed)
- Sweet and Twenty (1919)
- The Scarlet Wooing (1920)
- Judge Not (1920)
- Little Dorrit (1920)
- The Black Sheep (1920)
- The Woman of the Iron Bracelets (1920)
- Enchantment (1920)
- Lady Noggs (1920)
- Uncle Dick's Darling (1920)
- Moth and Rust (1921)
- The Princess of New York (1921)
- The Old Country (1921)
- The Four Just Men (1921)
- The Truants (1922)
- Was She Justified? (1922)
- A Lost Leader (1922)
- Open Country (1922)
- Not for Sale (1924)
- The Mating of Marcus (1926)
- The Valley of Ghosts (1928)
- Houp La! (1928)
- Red Aces (1930)
- Midnight (1931)
- The Officers' Mess (1931)
- Stepping Stones (1931)
- Mixed Doubles (1933)
