= Charles Rock =

British actor (1866–1919)

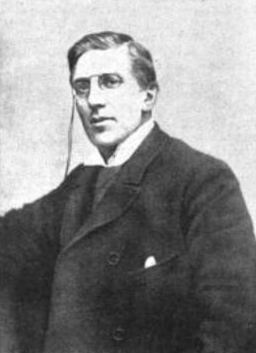
- Born: Arthur Charles Rock de Fabeck; 30 May 1866; Vellore, India
- Died: 12 July 1919 (aged 53); St John's Wood, London, England
- Occupation: Actor

Charles Rock (30 May 1866 – 12 July 1919) was a British actor. He was born Arthur Charles Rock de Fabeck.

Rock also wrote at least one play: The Ghost of Jerry Bundler, adapted from W. W. Jacobs' story Jerry Bundler. It was cast at the Haymarket Theatre on 9 September 1902, with Rock starring as the character George (waiter).

== Biography ==
Arthur Charles Rock de Fabeck was born in Vellore, India on 30 May 1866.

He died at his home in St John's Wood on 12 July 1919.

== Selected filmography ==
- She Stoops to Conquer (1914)
- The Third String (1914)
- The Black Spot (1914)
- Called Back (1914)
- The Christian (1915)
- The Firm of Girdlestone (1915)
- The Prisoner of Zenda (1915)
- Rupert of Hentzau (1915)
- Beau Brocade (1916)
- A Fair Impostor (1916)
- Esther (1916)
- Partners at Last (1916)
- The Hypocrites (1916)
- Vice Versa (1916)
- The Romance of Old Bill (1918)
- A Romany Lass (1918)
- The Chinese Puzzle (1919)
