= George Loane Tucker =

American film director, actor and screenwriter

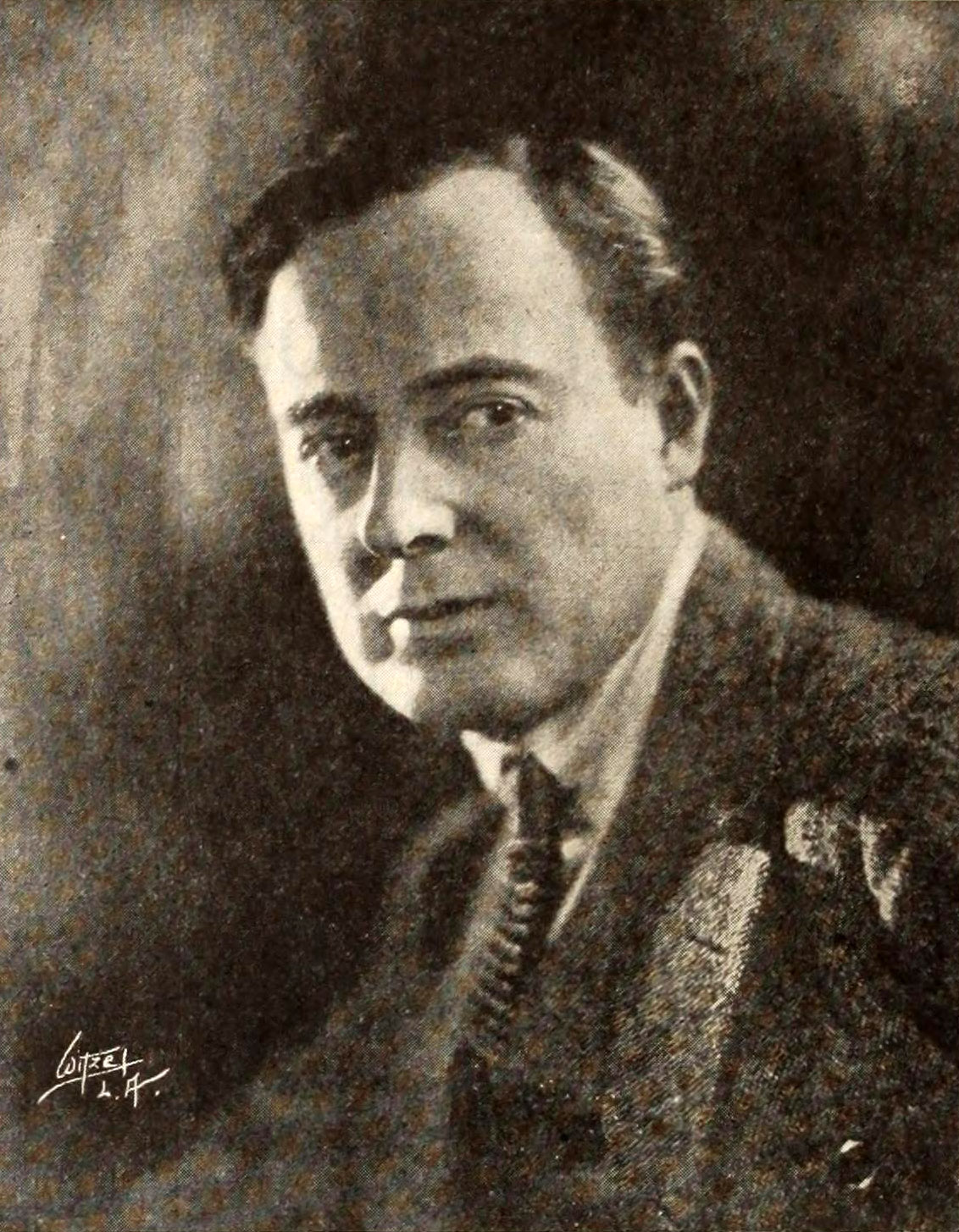
- Tucker in 1920
- Born: George S. Loane; June 12, 1872; Chicago, Illinois, U.S.
- Died: June 20, 1921 (aged 49); Los Angeles, California, U.S.
- Resting place: Hollywood Forever Cemetery
- Education: University of Chicago
- Occupations: Film director, actor, producer, screenwriter, editor
- Years active: 1909–1921
- Spouse: Elisabeth Risdon (m. 1916)

George Loane Tucker (June 12, 1872 – June 20, 1921) was an American actor, silent film director, screenwriter, producer, and editor.

== Career ==
Tucker was born George S. Loane in Chicago to George Loane and stage actress Ethel Tucker. After graduating from the University of Chicago, he got a job as a railroad clerk. He was chief clerk for the Maintenance of Way. Tucker was later the youngest man to be promoted to Contracting Freight Agent. After his first wife died while giving birth to the couple's son, Tucker quit his job. On the advice of friends, he began acting in stage productions.

By the mid-1910s, films were becoming a more popular draw for audiences which led Tucker to film acting and scenario writing. In 1911, he wrote a script for the short drama film Their First Misunderstanding. The film, which starred Mary Pickford, was a surprise hit.

Over the course of his career, Tucker directed 69 films, 19 of which he also wrote. In 1913 he directed Traffic in Souls, which concerned the topic of white slavery. The film was an enormous hit (it made over a million dollars in profit) and remains an early influential example of realism in early cinema. Traffic in Souls served to establish Tucker as a respected director and writer. Shortly after the film was released, he moved to England where he was hired as the Director-general for the London Film Company. It was there that Tucker met and married his second wife, British actress Elisabeth Risdon. While living in England, Tucker directed and produced several films for London Film including The Manxman (1917). An adaptation of the 1894 novel of the same name, it was one of the few British films that was distributed in the United States and would go on to become a financial and critical success.

In late 1916, Tucker returned to the United States in where he was hired as the Director-general for Goldwyn Pictures. That year, he wrote and directed The Cinderella Man which became that year's most profitable film. The following year, Tucker wrote and directed another hit, Virtuous Wives, starring Anita Stewart. In 1919, Tucker wrote, produced and directed what became his most well known and financially successful film, The Miracle Man. The film featured Lon Chaney in a breakout role as a man who pretends to be handicapped. The Miracle Man was a critical and financial success (some critics called it "the greatest picture ever made") and made the film's stars, Chaney and Thomas Meighan, established stars. Shortly before his death, Tucker completed direction on the drama Ladies Must Live. The film was released in October 1921, approximately four months after his death.

== Death ==
On June 20, 1921, Tucker died after a year long illness at his home in Los Angeles at the age of 49. He was survived by his wife, actress Elisabeth Risdon. Tucker is buried at Hollywood Forever Cemetery.

== Selected filmography ==
As actor:

Year	Title	Role	Notes
1909	The Awakening of Bess	The Heavy	Short film
1911	Pictureland	The Tourist	Short film
1911	Second Sight		Short film
1911	The Fair Dentist	Dental Patient	Alternative title: Mary's Patients; Short film
1911	Uncle's Visit	Mr. Sperry	Short film
1911	The Piece of String	The Tourist	also director Short film
1911	In the Sultan's Garden		Short film
1911	For the Queen's Honor	Duke Arturo	Short film
1911	A Gasoline Engagement	Rev. John Maxwell	Short film
1911	Dorothy's Family	Dorothy's Second Suitor	Short film
1912	Does Your Wife Love You?	George	Credited as George Tucker; Short film
1912	The Closed Bible	The Convict's Daughter's Husband	Credited as George Tucker; Short film
1912	The Winning Punch	James Roth	Short film
1912	Next	Edward Robbins, Successful Suitor	Short film
1912	An Old Lady of Twenty		Credited as George Tucker; Short film
1913	The Whole Truth	George Truthtell	also director Short film
1913	The Temptation of Jane	Harry Charlton	Short film
1913	Traffic in Souls	Wireless Operator	also director

As director/producer/writer:

Year	Title	Credit	Notes
1911	Their First Misunderstanding	Director; Writer	Short film
1911	Little Red Riding Hood	Director	Short film
1911	Over the Hills	Director	Short film
1911	The Portrait	Director; Writer	Short film
1911	The Aggressor	Director	Short film
1911	Behind the Stockade	Director; Writer	Short film
1911	The Brothers	Director	
1911	The Dream	Director	
1911	For Her Brother's Sake	Director	
1911	The Piece of String	Director	also actor
1911	The Rose's Story	Director	Short film
1911	The Scarlet Letter	Director	Short film
1911	Dangerous Lines	Director	Short film
1912	The Old Folks' Christmas	Director; Writer	Short film
1912	Prince Charming	Director; Writer	Short film
1913	Traffic in Souls	Director; Writer	also actor
1913	The Big Sister	Director	Short film
1913	His Hour of Triumph	Director	Short film
1913	Their Parents	Director	Short film
1913	The Whole Truth	Director	also actor Short film
1913	Just a Fire Fighter	Director	Short film
1913	The Count Retires	Director	Short film
1913	The Jealousy of Jane	Director	Short film
1913	A Possibility	Director	Short film
1913	The Yogi	Director	Short film
1913	In Peril of the Sea	Director	Short film
1913	Hidden Fires	Director	Short film
1913	Jane of Moth-Eaten Farm	Director	Short film
1913	The Temptation of Jane	Director	Short film
1913	Jane's Brother, the Paranoiac	Director	Short film
1914	The Third String	Director	
1914	The Revenge of Mr. Thomas Atkins	Director	Short film
1914	The Dawn of Romance	Director	Short film
1914	She Stoops to Conquer	Director	Short film
1914	The Cage	Director	Short film
1914	The Black Spot	Director	Short film
1914	A Bachelor's Love Story	Director	Short film
1914	The Difficult Way	Director	Short film
1914	England Expects	Director; Writer	Short film
1914	0-18 or A Message from the Sky	Director	
1914	Called Back	Director	
1914	The Fringe of War	Director	
1915	His Lordship	Director	
1915	Her Uncle	Director	
1915	The Prisoner of Zenda	Director	
1915	The Sons of Satan	Director	
1915	The Christian	Director	
1915	1914	Director	
1915	The Middleman	Director	
1915	Rupert of Hentzau	Director	
1915	The Folly of Desire	Director	
1915	A Man of His Word	Director; Writer	
1916	The Game of Liberty	Director	Alternative title: Under Suspicion
1916	Arsène Lupin	Director	
1916	The Manxman	Director	Lost film
1916	The Heel of the Law	Director	
1916	Homeless	Director	Short film
1916	A Story from Life	Director	
1916	Mixed Relations	Director; Writer	Short film
1916	An Odd Freak	Director; Writer	Short film
1916	The Hypocrites	Director	
1916	I Believe	Director; Writer	
1917	The Mother of Dartmoor	Director	
1917	The Cinderella Man	Director; Writer	
1918	Dodging a Million	Director; Writer	
1918	Joan of Plattsburg	Director; Writer	
1918	Virtuous Wives	Director; Writer	
1918	The Beloved Traitor	Writer; Editor	
1919	The Miracle Man	Director; Writer; Producer	
1921	Ladies Must Live	Director; Writer	
