= 2004 in public domain =

When a work's copyright expires, it enters the public domain. The following is a list of works that entered the public domain in 2004. Since laws vary globally, the copyright status of some works are not uniform.

== Entered the public domain in countries with life + 70 years ==
With the exception of Belarus (Life + 50 years) and Spain (Life + 80 years for creators that died before 1987), a work enters the public domain in Europe 70 years after the creator's death, if it was published during the creator's lifetime. The list is sorted alphabetically and includes a notable work of the creator that entered the public domain on January 1, 2004.

Names	Country	Birth	Death	Occupation	Notable work
J. M. Robertson	United Kingdom	14 November 1856	5 January 1933	politician, journalist.	Trade and Tariffs, The Fallacy of Saving – A Study in Economics, History of Freethought in the Nineteenth Century, Pagan Christs – Studies in Comparative Hierology, The Historical Jesus: A Survey of Positions, The Jesus Problem: Restatement of the Myth Theory, Jesus and Judas
Hugo Zöller	Germany	12 January 1852	1933	explorer, journalist.	Rund um die Erde, Die Deutschen im brasilianischen Urwald, Pampas und Anden
George Moore	Ireland	24 February 1852	21 January 1933	novelist, short-story writer, poet, art critic, memoirist and dramatist.	Confessions of a Young Man, Esther Waters
Sara Teasdale	United States	8 August 1884	29 January 1933	lyric poet.	Love Songs, Sonnets to Duse and Other Poems, Helen of Troy and Other Poems, Rivers to the Sea
John Galsworthy	United Kingdom	14 August 1867	31 January 1933	novelist, playwright.	The Forsyte Saga, The Silver Box, A Modern Comedy, End of the Chapter
Takiji Kobayashi	Japan	13 October 1903	20 February 1933	novelist, proletarian literature writer.	Kani Kōsen (The Crab Cannery Ship), Fuzaijinushi (The Absentee Landlord), March 15, 1928, Life of a Party Member, The Dogs That Kill Men
Earl Derr Biggers	United States	26 August 1884	5 April 1933	novelist, playwright, detective fiction writer, journalist.	The House Without a Key, The Chinese Parrot, Behind That Curtain, The Black Camel
E. W. Hobson	United Kingdom	27 October 1856	19 April 1933	mathematician.	The theory of functions of a real variable and the theory of Fourier's series, Mathematics, from the points of view of the Mathematician and of the Physicist, John Napier and the Invention of Logarithms, 1614, The Theory of Spherical and Ellipsoidal Harmonics
Janet Milne Rae	United Kingdom	8 July 1844	24 April 1933	novelist, missionary.	Morag: A Tale of Highland Life, Geordie's Tryst: A Tale of Scottish Life, A Bottle in the Smoke: A Tale of Anglo-Indian Life, The Awakening of Priscilla
Constantine P. Cavafy	Greece	29 April 1863	29 April 1933	poet, journalist, civil servant.	Waiting for the Barbarians, Ithaca, In Sparta, The God Abandons Antony, Kaisarion
Anna de Noailles	France	15 November 1876	30 April 1933	novelist, poet, autobiographer.	Les Innocentes, ou La Sagesse des femmes, Le Livre de ma vie, Les Vivants et les Morts, Les Forces éternelles
Leonard Huxley	United Kingdom	11 December 1860	3 May 1933	biographer, magazine editor, schoolteacher.	Life and Letters of Thomas Henry Huxley, Life and Letters of Sir Joseph Dalton Hooker OM, GCSI, Charles Darwin, Thomas Henry Huxley: a character sketch
John Henry Mackay	Germany	6 February 1864	16 May 1933	anarchist philosopher, sports novelist.	Die Anarchisten (The Anarchists: A Picture of Civilization at the Close of the Nineteenth Century), Leidenschaft(The Swimmer: The Story of a Passion), Die Bücher der namenlosen Liebe von Sagitta (Sagitta's Books of the Love without a Name), Der Freiheitsucher (The Freedom Seeker), Der Puppenjunge (The Hustler).
Horatio Bottomley	United Kingdom	23 March 1860	26 May 1933	nationalist politician, World War I-era propagandist, magazine editor, newspaper proprietor, journalist, financier, fraudster.	Founder of John Bull, co-founder of Financial Times, regular writer of the column series The World, the Flesh and the Devil, writer of Why Not a Women's Parliament?
Dragutin Domjanić	Croatia	12 September 1875	7 June 1933	poet, writer of puppet plays	Fala, Popevke sam slagal, Petrica Kerempuh and the Smart Ass
Anthony Hope	United Kingdom	9 February 1863	8 July 1933	adventure fiction writer, playwright	The Prisoner of Zenda, Rupert of Hentzau, Tales of Two People, A Man of Mark, The Dolly Dialogues
Alexandru Philippide	Romania	1 May 1859	12 August 1933	linguist, philologist, university professor, polemicist	Introducere în istoria limbei și literaturei române (Introduction to the History of Romanian Language and Literature), Gramatică elementară a limbii române (Elementary Grammar of the Romanian Language), Un specialist român la Lipsca (A Romanian Specialist at Leipzig), Originea românilor (The Origin of the Romanians)
Annie Besant	United Kingdom	1 October 1847	20 September 1933	political writer, Theosophist, women's rights activist, activist for both Irish and Indian Self-governance	Christianity: Its Evidences, Its Origin, Its Morality, Its History, A Study in Consciousness: A contribution to the science of psychology., Esoteric Christianity, Man's Life in This and Other Worlds, The Life and Teaching of Muhammad, Sins of the Church: Threatenings and Slaughters
György Almásy	Hungary	11 August 1867	23 September 1933	zoologist, ornithologist, ethnographer	Madártani betekintés a román Dobrudzsába(Ornithological investigation into the Romanian Dobruja),Utazásom orosz Turkesztánba (My Journey to Russian Turkestan), Vándor-utam Ázsia szívébe (My Travels to the Heart of Asia)
Ring Lardner	United States	6 March 1885	25 September 1933	sports columnist, novelist, short-story writer, satirist	regular writer for the column series In the Wake of the News, wrote You Know Me Al, Haircut, Alibi Ike, Elmer, the Great, June Moon
Pascal Poirier	Canada	15 February 1852	25 September 1933	politician, historian, lawyer	L'Origine des Acadiens, Les Acadiens de Philadelphie, Le Père Lefebvre et l'Acadie, Le Parler franco-acadien et ses origines
G. R. S. Mead	United Kingdom	22 March 1863	28 September 1933	historian, translator, magazine editor, Theosophist	Fragments of a Faith Forgotten, Did Jesus Live 100 BC?, Thrice Greatest Hermes: Studies in Hellenistic Theosophy and Gnosis, The Mysteries Of Mithra, The Chaldæan Oracles, Gnostic John the Baptizer: Selections from the Mandæan John-Book
Herminie Templeton Kavanagh	Ireland	6 May 1861	30 October 1933	short-story writer, playwright	Darby O'Gill and the Good People, Ashes of Old Wishes and Other Darby O'Gill Tales, The Color Sergeant, Swift-Wing of the Cherokee
F. Holland Day	United States	23 July 1864	23 November 1933	photographer, publisher	The Seven Last Words
Augustine Birrell	United Kingdom	19 January 1850	20 November 1933	politician, essayist, humorist, college professor	Obiter Dicta, Res Judicatae: Papers and Essays, More Obiter Dicta, Things Past Redress, Eight Years of Tory Government, 1895-1903; home affairs; handbook for the use of liberals
Minnie Earl Sears	United States	17 November 1873	28 November 1933	librarian, cataloguer, bibliographer	writer of the Sears List of Subject Headings and the List of Subject Headings for Small Libraries, editor of the Standard Catalog for Public Libraries and the Standard Catalog for High School Libraries, co-editor of the Essay and General Literature Index
Annie Armitt	United Kingdom	1850	30 November 1933	novelist, poet, short story writer, essayist	The Garden at Monkholme, In Shallow Waters, Man and His Relatives: A Question of Morality
Stefan George	Germany	12 July 1868	4 December 1933	symbolist poet, translator	Der Krieg (The War), Das neue Reich (The New Realm), Die Bücher der Hirten- und Preisgedichte, der Sagen und Sänge, und der hängenden Gärten(The Books of Eclogues and Eulogies, of Legends and Lays, and of the Hanging Gardens), Der siebente Ring (The Seventh Ring)
Robert W. Chambers	United States	26 May 1865	16 December 1933	short-story writer, supernatural horror writer, weird fiction writer	The King in Yellow, The Maker of Moons, The Mystery of Choice, The Tree of Heaven
Georgina Castle Smith	United Kingdom	9 May 1845	27 December 1933	children's writer	Nothing to Nobody, Froggy's Little Brother, Five Little Partridges, or, The Pilot's House, The Secret Terror
Jennie M. Bingham	United States	16 March 1859	27 June 1933	short-story writer, poet, biographer	A Grain of Mustard Seed, Melissa's Successful Failure, Margy's Holy Grail, Charlotte Brontë, Rembrandt and His Picture, The Anatomy Lesson

== Entered the public domain in countries with life + 50 years ==
In most countries of Africa and Asia, as well as Belarus, Bolivia, Canada, New Zealand, Egypt and Uruguay; a work enters the public domain 50 years after the creator's death.

Names	Country	Birth	Death	Occupation	Notable work
Rachilde	France	11 February 1860	4 April 1953	novelist, playwright	Monsieur Vénus, La Marquise de Sade, La Jongleuse
Idris Davies	United Kingdom	6 January 1905	6 April 1953	poet	Gwalia Deserta(Wasteland of Wales), The Angry Summer: A Poem of 1926, Tonypandy and other poems
C. E. M. Joad	United Kingdom	12 August 1891	9 April 1953	philosopher, political activist, New Party propagandist, BBC broadcasting personality, parapsychologist, ghost hunter, teacher	Guide to Modern Thought, Guide to Philosophy, Under the Fifth Rib, The Rational Approach to Conscription, The Meaning of Life As Shown in the Process of Evolution, The Story of Indian Civilisation, Man's Superiority to the Beasts : Liberty Versus Security in the Modern State
Gordon Hall Gerould	United States	1877	10 April 1953	philologist, folklorist, university professor	Sir Guy of Warwick, The Grateful Dead: The History of a Folk Story, Saints' Legends, The Ballad of Tradition
Alice Milligan	Ireland	4 September 1865	13 April 1953	dramatist, novelist, nationalist political activist, columnist, poet	regular writer of the column series Notes from the North, writer of The Last Feast of the Fianna: A Dramatic Legend, The Daughter of Donagh: A Cromwellian Drama in Four Acts, Sons of the Sea King, The Dynamite Drummer, Oisin in Tir-nan-Og, Glimpses of Erin: An Account of the Ancient Civilisation, Manners, Customs, and Antiquities of Ireland
Alfred Vierkandt	Germany	4 June 1867	24 April 1953	sociologist, ethnographer, social psychologist, social philosopher, philosopher of history	Naturvölker und Kulturvölker. Ein Beitrag zur Socialpsychologie, Allgemeine Verfassungs- und Verwaltungsgeschichte, Programm einer formalen Gesellschaftslehre (Program for a formal theory of society), Der Dualismus im modernen Weltbild
Moelona	United Kingdom	21 June 1877	5 June 1953	novelist, translator, children's writer, textbook writer	Rhamant Nyrs Bivan (Nurse Bevan's Romance), Alys Morgan, Teulu Bach Nantoer (The Little Family of Nantoer), Breuddwydion Myfanwy (The Dreams of Myfanwy)
Richard Jebb	United Kingdom	1874	25 June 1953	journalist, military writer, army instructor	
Elsa Beskow	Sweden	11 February 1874	30 June 1953	children's writer, illustrator	Tale of the Little Little Old Woman, Aunt Green, Aunt Brown and Aunt Lavender, Children of the Forest, Grandma's quilt, Buddy's Adventures in the Blueberry Patch, Talented Annika
Julia de Burgos	Puerto Rico	17 February 1914	6 July 1953	poet, journalist, political activist	Poema para Mi Muerte (My Death Poem), Yo Misma Fui Mi Ruta (I Was My Own Path), Alba de Mi Silencio (Dawn of My Silence)
Hilaire Belloc	United Kingdom	27 July 1870	16 July 1953	politician, historian, poet, satirist, biographer, travel writer, encyclopedist	Cautionary Tales for Children, The Bad Child's Book of Beasts, The Servile State, The Four Men: A Farrago, Europe and the Faith, The Jews, The Crusades: the World's Debate
J. H. M. Abbott	Australia	26 December 1874	12 August 1953	novelist, short-story writer, poet, journalist	Tommy Cornstalk : Being Some Account of the Less Notable Features of the South African War from the Point of View of the Australian Ranks, The King's School and Other Tales for Old Boys, Castle Vane : A Romance of Bushranging on the Upper Hunter in the Olden Days, Sydney Cove : A Romance of the First Fleet, Sally : The Tale of a Currency Lass
Maurice Nicoll	United Kingdom	19 July 1884	30 August 1953	neurologist, psychiatrist, esoteric teacher, novelist, short-story writer, dramatist	Psychological Commentaries on the Teaching of Gurdjieff and Ouspensky, Dream Psychology, Lord Richard in the Pantry, Cupid Goes North, In Mesopotamia, Half a Ton of Dynamite, An Awkward Situation
Eirik Vandvik	Norway	1904	1953	literature professor, classical scholar, medievalist, dictionary writer	Greek tragedy, Iliad
Ivan Bunin	Russia	22 October 1870	8 November 1953	realist novelist, short-story writer, diarist	The Village, Dry Valley, The Life of Arseniev, Dark Avenues, Cursed Days
John van Melle	South Africa	11 February 1887	8 November 1953	novelist, war fiction writer, schoolteacher	Bart Nel
Dylan Thomas	United Kingdom	27 October 1914	9 November 1953	poet, dramatist, scriptwriter for radio	Do not go gentle into that good night, And death shall have no dominion, Under Milk Wood, A Child's Christmas in Wales, Portrait of the Artist as a Young Dog
Eugene O'Neill	United States	16 October 1888	27 November 1953	realist playwright	Long Day's Journey into Night, Ah, Wilderness!, Beyond the Horizon, The Emperor Jones, Strange Interlude
T. F. Powys	United Kingdom	20 December 1875	27 November 1953	novelist, short-story writer	Mr. Weston's Good Wine, Unclay, The Soliloquy of a Hermit, An Interpretation of Genesis, Mr Tasker's Gods, The House With the Echo: Twenty-six Stories
Francis Picabia	France	22 January 1879	30 November 1953	avant-garde painter, writer, publisher, filmmaker, ballet writer	The Spring, La Nuit Espagnole (The Spanish Night), The Double World, Relâche, screenwriter for the film Entr'acte
Claude Scudamore Jarvis	United Kingdom	20 July 1879	8 December 1953	colonial governor, Arabist, naturalist, columnist	regular writer of the column series A Countryman's Notes, wrote Yesterday and To-day in Sinai, The Back Garden of Allah, Through Crusader Lands, Heresies and Humours, The forty years' wandering of the Israelites
Lulah Ragsdale	United States	5 February 1861	26 December 1953	novelist, dramatist, poet, actress	The Crime of Philip Guthrie, The Hand of Angèle, A Shadow's Shadow, The Little Ghost, Miss Dulcie from Dixie, The Next-Besters, The Dream Woman
Tan Khoen Swie	Indonesia	c. 1883	1953	publisher, writer, mystic	Eponymous founder of the publishing company Tan Khoen Swie Publishing Company, also published books under his own name which compiled texts from a variety of anonymous sources.

== Entering the public domain in the United States ==
In the United States, the copyright status of works extends for the life of the author or artists, plus 70 years. If the work is owned by a corporation, then the copyright extends 95 years.

Due to the passing of the Copyright Term Extension Act (Sonny Bono Copyright Term Extension Act) in 1998, works never registered or published before January 1, 1978, and whose authors died before 1934 entered the public domain in this jurisdiction on January 1, 2004. Other works would not enter the public domain here until 2019.

== See also ==
- 1903 in literature, 1933 in literature and 1953 in literature for deaths of writers
- Public Domain Day
- Creative Commons
