= The Haunts of Men =

The Haunts of Men is a collection of short stories by Robert W. Chambers, author of The King in Yellow (1895) and The Maker of Moons (1896). The first four tales feature the American Civil War, and most of the stories are set in America with Chambers' love of landscape prevalent. "Ambassador Extraordinary" is set in France, and the last two tales feature less distinguished reappearances of some of the characters in Paris that appeared in The King in Yellow.

Published by Frederick A. Stokes Company, New York, in 1898.

== Contents ==
- "The God of Battles"
- "Pickets"
- "An International Affair
- "Smith’s Battery"
- "Ambassador Extraordinary"
- "Yo Espero"
- "Collector of the Port"
- "The Whisper"
- "The Little Misery"
- "Enter the Queen"
- "Another Good Man"
