= Herbert Bunning =

English composer and musical director

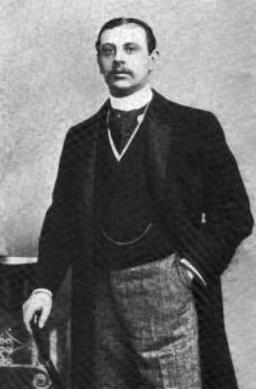
- In The Sketch, 16 April 1902
- Born: George Herbert Bunning; 2 May 1863; London, England
- Died: 26 November 1937 (aged 74); Thundersley, England
- Burial place: City of London Cemetery
- Education: Harrow School; Brasenose College, Oxford
- Occupation(s): Composer, musical director
- Spouse(s): Marguerite Wilhelmine, Marquise de Moligny (died 1937)

George Herbert Bunning (2 May 1863 – 26 November 1937) was an English composer and musical director active in the late 19th and early 20th centuries. He had one opera produced at Covent Garden, but was better known as a composer of lighter works and incidental music for stage productions.

== Life and career ==
Bunning was born in London, and educated at Harrow School and Brasenose College, Oxford. On leaving the latter he was commissioned into the British Army as a lieutenant in the Queen's Own Hussars, serving from 1884 to 1886. He resigned his commission and studied music in France, with Jules Massenet, and later in Italy (Milan) between 1886 and 1890. He was musical director of the Lyric Theatre, London (1892–1893), and the Prince of Wales Theatre, (1895–1896).

In 1902 Bunning's opera La Princesse Osra was produced at Covent Garden. The libretto was an Anglicised version of a French text based on Anthony Hope's Ruritanian novel The Heart of Princess Osra, and was ineffective. Despite a cast headed by Mary Garden, Adolphe Maréchal and Pol Plançon, conducted by André Messager, the piece was not a success. The Musical Times commented that Bunning's gifts were lyrical rather than dramatic. In a 2013 survey of opera in Britain between 1875 and 1918, Paul Rodmell cites Saint-Saëns and Massenet as influences on Bunning's musical style.

In addition to La Princesse Osra, Bunning published two orchestral suites, Shepherd's Call, 1893, and Village Suite, 1896; a scena, Sir Launcelot and Queen Guinevere, 1905; incidental music for a 1906 stage play Robin Hood; and a quantity of vocal and instrumental music. The British Library lists 97 compositions by Bunning in its holdings, mostly songs.

Bunning, who was half French, was married to Marguerite Wilhelmine, Marquise de Moligny. They had one child, who died in infancy. Bunning died at his home in Thundersley, Essex on 26 November 1937, aged 74, five weeks after the death of his wife. He was cremated and buried at City of London Cemetery.

== Sources ==
- Rodmell, Paul (2013). Opera in the British Isles, 1875–1918. Farnham: Ashgate. ISBN 978-1-4094-4162-5.
