= The Mask (Chambers short story) =

Short story by Robert W. Chambers

"The Mask" is a short story in four parts published by Robert W. Chambers in his 1895 collection The King in Yellow. The story involves the themes of fantasy and alchemy, as well as art, love, and uncanny science, and contains the motifs of the King in Yellow. The main fantasy element in the story is a mysterious solution capable of turning living beings into marble sculptures.

== Plot ==
=== Part one ===
The story opens with an excerpt from the fictional play The King in Yellow, Act 1, Scene 2d:

Camilla: You, sir, should unmask.
Stranger: Indeed?
Cassilda: Indeed it's time. We have all laid aside disguise but you.
Stranger: I wear no mask.
Camilla: (Terrified, aside to Cassilda) No mask? No mask!

In his home in Rue Sainte-Cécile, Paris, sculptor Boris Yvain has completed works representing figures such as the Madonna and Cupid, and is working on a representation of the Fates. Through a chemical process, he has produced a liquid that turns living beings immersed in it into pure marble representations of themselves. He demonstrates the solution to his painter friend Alec on an Easter lily and a goldfish, both of which are turned into white marble sculptures with azure and rose tints.

Amidst discussions about Boris's sculptures and his reluctance to reveal this transformative secret to the world, as it would forever disrupt science and art, the dynamic between the characters becomes apparent, as there is an unspoken love triangle involving Boris, Alec, and Geneviève, Boris's lover who was also the model for his acclaimed Madonna sculpture. Geneviève's ever-changing moods and interactions hint at deeper emotions and tensions within the trio.

=== Part two ===
The second part focuses on the daily life and dynamics among Boris, Alec, Geneviève, and their mutual friend Jack Scott. Boris continues his experiments with the transformative solution, accidentally almost dunking Alec into a pool filled with it. Later, Boris and Jack leave for an art exhibition, leaving Alec to work on a project for Geneviève's boudoir.

Alec's artistic frustrations lead to a break, and he relaxes in the smoking room, eventually dozing off. He awakens to hauntingly sad music and discovers Geneviève weeping in the dark room, playing a spinet. Mistaking Alec's voice for Boris's, Geneviève, who had stumbled upon a wolf's head in the room and sprained her ankle, collapses in pain, revealing she is alone and injured. Boris and the household servants are absent, leaving Alec feeling guilty for not realizing earlier and offering assistance.

Boris and Jack are still away in the following day, and Alec, concerned for her well-being, tries to help. He tries to reassure her with a small lie about the music, prompting Geneviève's gratitude. Eventually, Alec arranges for assistance and leaves Geneviève in the care of a maid.

=== Part three ===
Boris frantically tends to Geneviève as she succumbs to a mysterious fever. While she is taken care of, Boris, in order to distract himself from distress, turns yet another goldfish into marble with the transformative solution, and then decides to do the same to a white rabbit. Alec avoids witnessing this, and instead turns to reading the play The King in Yellow.

Still feverish, Geneviève wakes up briefly and says Alec's name. While Alec is astonished by this, Boris tries to comfort his friend, saying "It is not your fault, Alec, don't grieve so if she loves you".

Alec hurriedly leaves, taking Jack with him, and concludes he is going to be ill as well. He enters a long-lasting period of illness, with the last thing he remembers before it being Jack saying "For Heaven's sake, doctor, what ails him, to wear a face like that?", which reminded Alec of the Pallid Mask in The King in Yellow.

Alec is drawn into a period of feverish delirium with terrifying hallucinations involving Boris, Geneviève, and motifs in The King in Yellow. He also recalls that Geneviève's words were actually "I love you, but I think I love Boris best". While he recovers, Jack takes care of him, and he repeatedly asks Jack to see Boris and Geneviève, but is never granted that request.

Before almost reaching full recovery, Alec wonders on his plans to meet Boris and Geneviève again, aiming to leave their lives forever afterward. However, Jack finally reveals that they are both dead. Alec, in a fit of rage, sinks into weeks of relapse, after which Jack, in a heartbreaking narrative, reveals what happened to their friends—Geneviève drowned in the pool after falling under the influence of drugs, becoming a marble sculpture, and Boris shot himself in despair. Jack also tells Alec of his own meticulous actions to eradicate any trace of the transformative solution and the formula to produce it after the tragic events, as well as his work with a doctor to cover up the strange events. He then reveals Boris's will, which bequeaths everything to Geneviève, with the house and marbles left to Alec, and Jack entrusted with another property. Jack departs to fulfill Boris's wishes.

The devastating revelation leaves Alec shattered, realizing the finality of their intertwined lives and the profound tragedy that has torn them apart forever.

=== Part four ===
After inheriting Boris's house, Alec finally faces the haunting memories by returning to Rue Sainte-Cécile. However, overwhelmed by the silence and grief, he locks up the house and leaves for Constantinople, spending two years in the East trying to escape the tragedy. Yet, the memories of Boris and Geneviève keep resurfacing, eventually in letters from Jack, even though they initially avoided the subject.

Upon Jack's urgent request, Alec returns to Paris, where they spend time together, visiting Boris's resting place at the cemetery in Sèvres. However, Jack's restless dreams and inexplicable anxiety prompt him to separate temporarily. Alec decides to move into Boris's house, now his, finding solace in painting but avoiding the marble room where Geneviève's body, now a fine marble sculpture, rests.

One April afternoon, drawn by an irresistible force, Alec finally opens the sealed door to the marble room. Bathed in sunlight, he discovers Geneviève lying under the Madonna's tender gaze, with a faint warmth beneath the marble. Overwhelmed, he kisses the marble and retreats into the house.

As he sits in the conservatory reading a letter from Jack, a maid interrupts, speaking of strange occurrences—a live rabbit replacing the marble one, and live fish replacing the marble ones. Frustrated, Alec investigates, finding the marble Easter lily transformed into a fresh, fragrant flower. Suddenly understanding, he rushes back to the marble room. As the doors open, Geneviève, alive and flushed, wakes from her marble slumber, greeted by the heavenly smile of the Madonna.

== Characters ==
- Alec: The story's twenty-year-old protagonist and first-person narrator. He is a painter who is in love with Geneviève.
- Boris Yvain: A twenty-three-year-old American sculptor of Russian and French ancestry, the lover of Geneviève and friend of the protagonist.
- Geneviève: A beautiful eighteen-year-old girl and Boris' lover.
- Jack Scott: Another friend of the group.
