= The Repairer of Reputations =

Short story by Robert W. Chambers

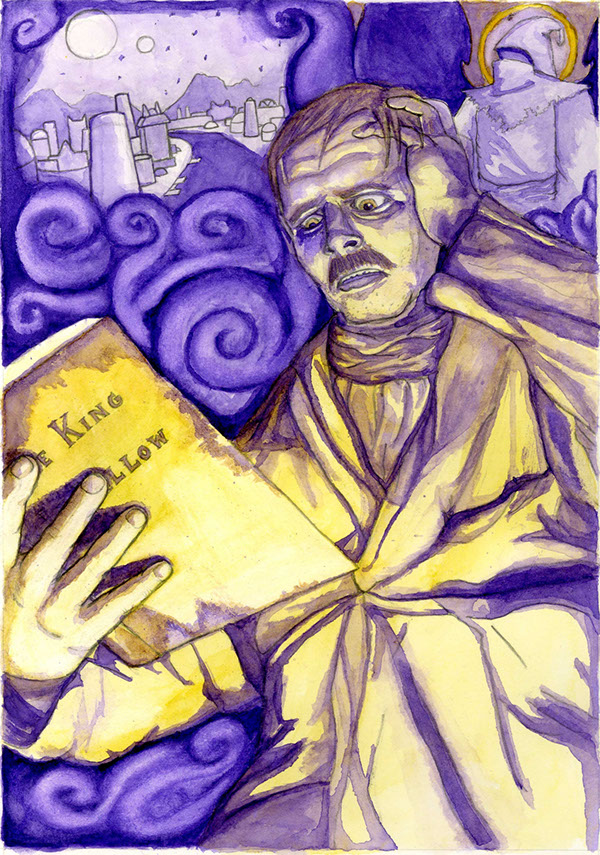
An illustration of Hildred Castaigne, protagonist of the story, reading the eldritch play that serves as the driving plot device and common thread throughout much of The King in Yellow.

"The Repairer of Reputations" is a short story published by the American writer Robert W. Chambers in the collection The King in Yellow in 1895. The story is an example of Chambers' horror fiction, and is one of the stories in the collection which contains the motif of the Yellow Sign and the King in Yellow.

== Plot ==
The story is purportedly set in New York City in the year 1920, 25 years after the story's publication. It is told from the view of Hildred Castaigne, a man whose personality changes drastically following a head injury sustained by falling from his horse. He is subsequently committed to an asylum for treatment of insanity by Dr. Archer. Due to his accident, Hildred is a prime example of an unreliable narrator.

As related by Hildred, the United States has apparently prospered in the meantime, significantly improving its infrastructure. The rise of a new aristocratic elite in the United States has resulted in new laws that reduce the influence and immigration of those considered foreign, including exclusion of all foreign-born Jews and the establishment of a state for those of African descent. Further forced assimilation of Native populations has also been implemented to resemble the use of Cossacks in the military. (Chambers belies the extent to which this "solves" the "Indian problem" by also noting the installation of an equestrian statue of Philip Sheridan.) Suicide has been legalized, and has been made generally and readily accessible in the newly established government "Lethal Chambers" being rapidly rolled out across every town and city.

While still recovering from his accident, Hildred obtains and reads The King in Yellow (a use, by the author, of a false document), which is represented as a universally censored play which deeply disturbs him. Once a wealthy dilettante and affable man-about-town, after his accident Hildred becomes an eccentric recluse who spends his days poring over old books and maps and associating with a more eccentric character, Mr. Wilde, the "Repairer of Reputations" of the story's title.

Wilde claims to be the architect of a vast conspiracy which uses, amongst other devices, blackmail to influence and command powerful men whose reputations the conspiracy has saved from scandal. Hildred imagines that, with Wilde's help, he will become the heir of the "Last King" of "The Imperial Dynasty of America", which Wilde says is descended from a lost kingdom within distant stars in the Hyades. Hildred, however, perceives his cousin Louis standing before him in the line of succession. Thus, he plans to force Louis to abdicate his claim to the throne, accept exile, and never marry.

Louis, realizing that Hildred is still mentally ill, humors him by agreeing to abdicate his claim, but becomes angry when Hildred insists that Louis cannot marry his fiancée, Constance Hawberk. Louis is shocked when Hildred claims that he has murdered Dr. Archer and had Constance assassinated. When Hildred runs back to the apartment of Mr. Wilde, there is confusion in its dark doorway: Wilde's cat rushes out as Hildred is trying to enter, Hildred's "long knife flew" then hears the cat "tumbling and thumping about in the darkness…and…Mr. Wilde lay on the floor with throat torn open". Hildred's plans of conquering the United States with the help of Wilde's conspiracy are destroyed. The police arrive, and Hildred sees Constance crying as he is dragged away. It is ambiguous whether or not Hildred actually committed any murders.

The story ends with a note that Hildred died in an asylum for the criminally insane.

== "Anti-story" nature of the work ==
Chambers produced in this piece an early version of what has since become called the "anti-story". This is a type of fiction writing where one (or more) of the fundamental rules of short story telling is broken in some way, often resulting in what most readers would consider "experimental literature". In the case of "The Repairer of Reputations", Chambers invites the reader to doubt every single detail the unreliable narrator relates. Chambers breaks the basic contract between author and reader by refusing to relate something that is both interesting and truthful (even given the "suspension of disbelief" required of fiction). He makes this clear at a point in the story when Hildred dons his diadem and describes it as being made of "heavy beaten gold" only to have Louis call it a "brass crown" shortly afterwards; likewise, what Hildred calls a "steel safe" is seen by Louis to be a "biscuit box".

== Characters ==
- Hildred Castaigne: The protagonist and narrator of the story, Hildred's character is much changed after sustaining a head injury and reading The King in Yellow during his convalescence. Hildred spends much of his time poring over old books; he never mentions work and appears to be independently wealthy. Hildred is a classic example of an unreliable narrator, as he often comments that other people appear to be humouring him or treating things he regards as very important as inconsequential or non-existent.
- Louis Castaigne: Hildred's cousin and a military officer, Louis does not share his cousin's intellectualism or ambition, and is mainly focused on his love for Hawberk's daughter, Constance. Louis is horrified to find that Hildred has been reading The King in Yellow, but appears to make an effort to humour Hildred's eccentricities and strange behaviour.
- Hawberk: An armourer, Hawberk fashions and repairs antique bits of armour in a little shop below Mr. Wilde's. Castaigne and Mr. Wilde both believe that Hawberk is secretly the exiled Marquis of Avonshire (a fictional shire in England). Hawberk is noticeably shaken when Castaigne obliquely implies this in conversation. Hawberk's name comes from the word "hauberk", meaning a shirt of mail.
- Constance Hawberk: Hawberk's daughter, a beautiful girl engaged to Louis Castaigne.
- Mr. Wilde: A bizarre and eccentric character, Mr. Wilde lives in a dingy office above Hawberk's shop, where his door advertises him as a "Repairer of Reputations". Mr. Wilde is deformed (possibly microcephalic) and mutilated, having lost his ears and several fingers. He keeps a vicious feral cat which he habitually provokes into attacking him. Although his sanity is questionable, the narrator treats Wilde as a genius who is a living library of valuable information, and believes he holds powerful men under his sway.

== Critical reception ==
David G. Hartwell described "The Repairer of Reputations" as "an extraordinary achievement" and "a horrific tale that is also a sophisticated, avant-garde work of science fiction".
