= The Heart of Princess Osra =

1896 novel by Anthony Hope

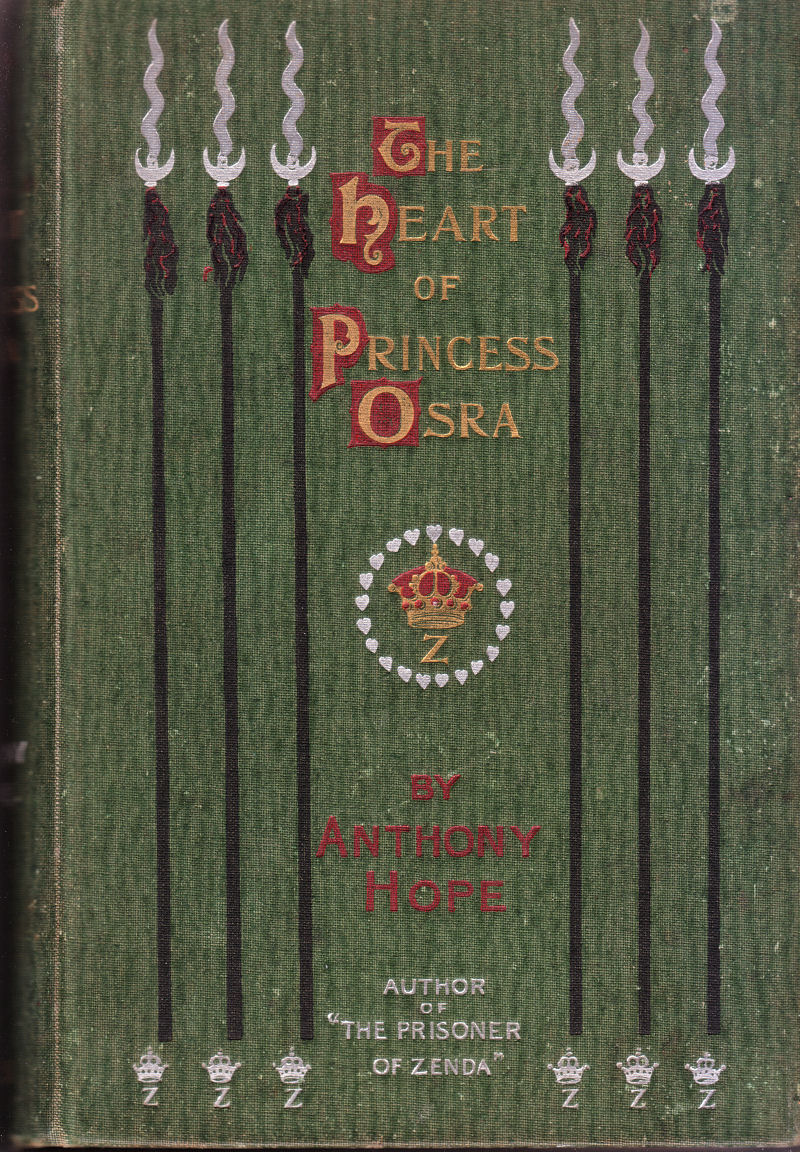
- First edition cover
- Author: Anthony Hope
- Language: English
- Genre: Historical novel
- Publisher: Frederick A. Stokes
- Publication date: 1896
- Publication place: United Kingdom
- Media type: Print (Hardback & Paperback)
- Pages: 301 pp
- Followed by: The Prisoner of Zenda

The Heart of Princess Osra is an 1896 novel and is part of Anthony Hope's trilogy of books which spawned the genre of Ruritanian romance. This collection of linked short stories is a prequel: it was written immediately after the success of The Prisoner of Zenda (1894) and was published in 1896, but is set in the 1730s, well over a century before the events of the first novel and its sequel, Rupert of Hentzau (1898). The stories are set in the fictional country of Ruritania, a Germanic kingdom, and deal with the love life of Princess Osra of the House of Elphberg. Osra is the younger sister of Rudolf III, the shared ancestor of Rudolf Rassendyll, the English gentleman who acts as political decoy in The Prisoner of Zenda, and Rudolph V, the absolute monarch of Ruritania.

Literary scholar Shoshana Milgram Knapp has observed that Hope's stories in the volume are both analytic of and acclamatory toward the inspiration of romantic love:

"Osra's physical beauty is a metaphor for spiritual beauty. Her name, the feminine form of "Osric," is not an invention, but it is sufficiently unusual to suggest that the character is herself extraordinary, separated from life’s routine. Who will best love Osra? He who best knows her, and matches her. In Ruritania, love is the appreciation of the beloved’s uniqueness, accompanied by the commitment to rise to one’s best. And because Osra is not merely a prize to be valued, but a human being capable of valuing, she herself can learn what her suitors learn: that romantic love inspires extraordinary action.

"The nine individual stories follow a pattern. A man meets Princess Osra, and immediately develops a consuming romantic passion for this extraordinary woman. In loyalty to his value, he performs an extraordinary act of courage, ingenuity, or passion. He does not act in order to win the princess’s affection, or to prove to her his worth. He performs his act, in most cases, without expecting Osra to recognize his deed, much less acknowledge or reward it. Sooner or later, Osra does in fact recognize and acknowledge the act; she does not, however, requite the love that inspired it."

Although The Prisoner of Zenda has been adapted many times for stage and screen, The Heart of Princess Osra has not.
