= Caesarion =

Pharaoh of Egypt from 44 to 30 BC

- Theos Philopator Philometor
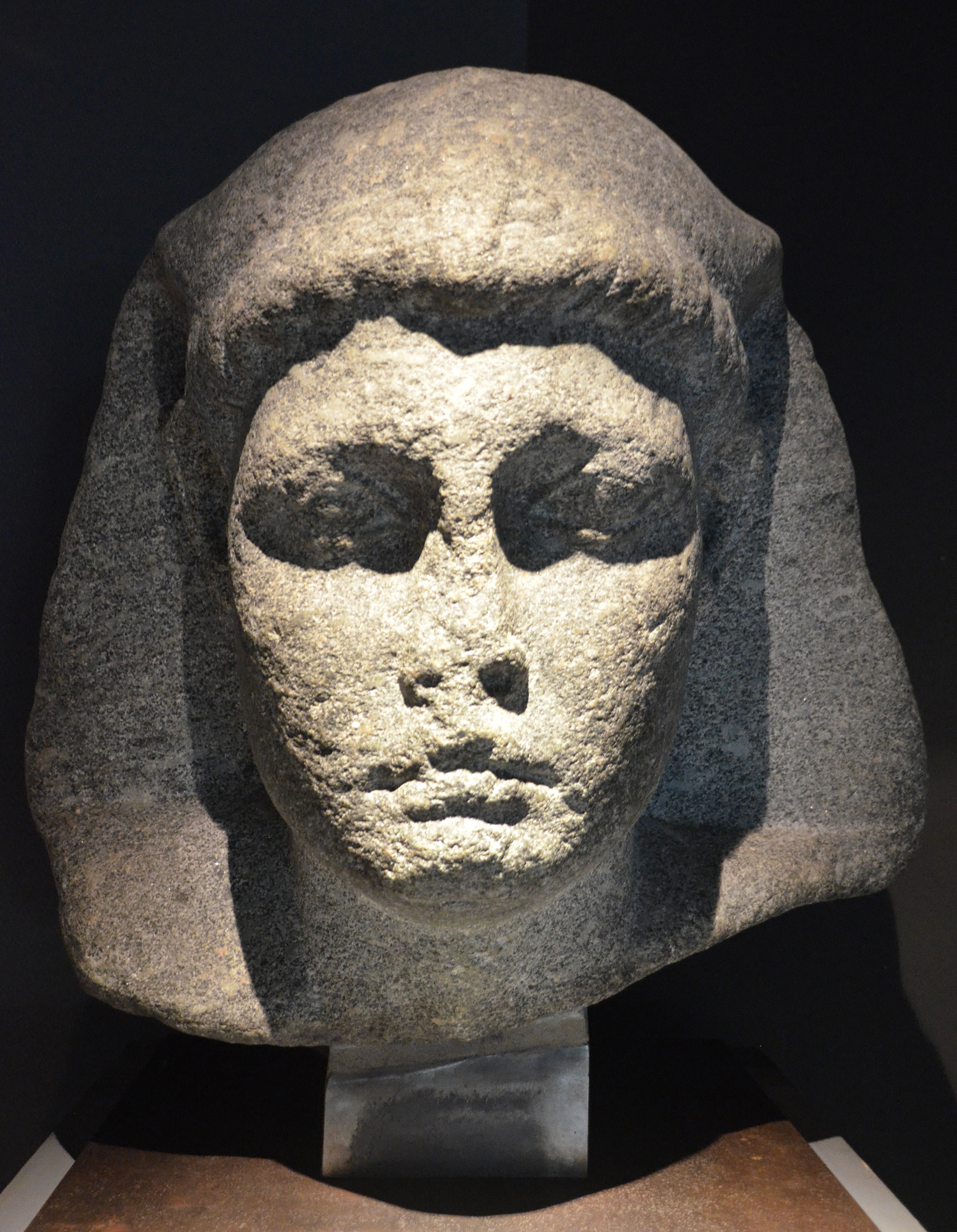
- Granite head identified as Caesarion, hosted in Bibliotheca Alexandrina Antiquities Museum, Egypt

King of the Ptolemaic Kingdom Pharaoh of Egypt
- Reign: 2 September 44 BC – 12 August 30 BC
- Coregency: Cleopatra VII
- Predecessor: Cleopatra VII and Ptolemy XIV
- Successor: Octavian (as Roman emperor) (Note: The Ptolemaic Kingdom was annexed by the Roman Republic in 30 BC and hence the office of pharaoh ceased to exist. However, due to the pharaoh's central position in Egyptian religion, the local people recognized Augustus and all subsequent Roman emperors as pharaohs for the sake of continuity; no emperor ever bore or recognized the title. See Roman pharaoh)
Royal titulary
Horus name
ḥwnw
Hunu
The youth
G5	H wn n nw W A17
Prenomen
iwꜤ pꜢ nṯr nti nḥm stp n ptḥ iri mꜢꜤt rꜤ sḫm (Ꜥnḫ) n imn
Iwapanetjernetynehem setepenptah irmaatra sekhem(ankh)enamun
The heir of the saviour god, chosen by Ptah, who brings forth the Maat of Ra, the living image of Amun

M23 X1 L2 X1	p nTr nw t N41 a p t H U21 n ir N36 C12 C2 n
Nomen
ptwlmys
Ptolemys
Ptolemy

G39 N5	p t wA l M i i s
kysrs
Kyseres
Caesar

G39 N5	k i i z r s
- Father: Julius Caesar
- Mother: Cleopatra VII
- Born: 23 June 47 BC; Ptolemaic Kingdom
- Died: 12 August 30 BC (aged 17); Alexandria, Ptolemaic Kingdom
- Dynasty: Ptolemaic dynasty

Ptolemy XV Caesar (Note: Later full name: Ptolemy Caesar Theos Philopator Philometor (Greek: Πτολεμαῖος Καῖσαρ Θεὸς Φιλοπάτωρ Φιλομήτωρ).) (/ˈtɒləmi/; Ancient Greek: Πτολεμαῖος Καῖσαρ, Ptolemaios Kaisar; 47 BC – late August 30 BC), nicknamed Caesarion (Greek: Καισαρίων, Kaisaríōn, "Little Caesar"), was the last pharaoh of the Ptolemaic Kingdom of Egypt, reigning with his mother Cleopatra VII from 44 BC to 30 BC. He nominally reigned as sole pharaoh for a few days after his mother's death, although Alexandria had already fallen and Caesarion remained in hiding until his execution by Octavian, who would become the first Roman emperor as "Augustus".

Caesarion was the eldest son of Cleopatra and was the only known biological son of Julius Caesar, after whom he was named. He was the last sovereign member of the Ptolemaic dynasty, and the last pharaoh of Ancient Egypt, ending more than 3,000 years of traditional kingship.

== Early life ==
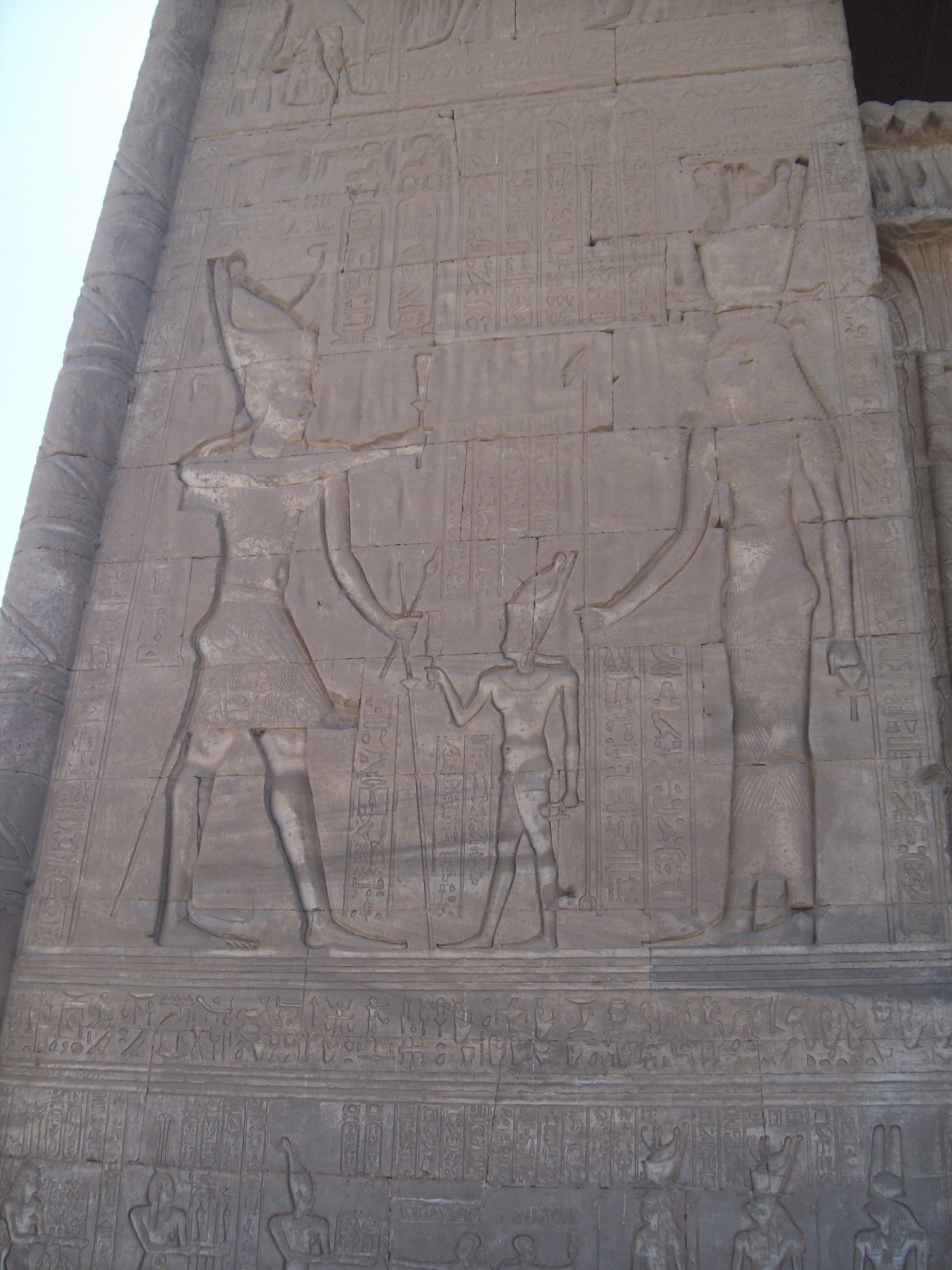
Caesarion as a child between Cleopatra VII and Julius Caesar. A relief from Temple of Hathor at Dendera.

Caesarion was born in Egypt 47 BC. An Egyptian demotic stele recovered from the Serapeum in Memphis, records his birth on 23 June 47 BC. He was conceived during Julius Caesar's extended residence in Egypt in September 48 BC. During this period, Caesar intervened in the Alexandrian War, militarily supporting Cleopatra's claim to the Ptolemaic throne against her brother and rival, Ptolemy XIII.

In late 46 BC, Cleopatra traveled to Rome at the invitation of Julius Caesar, bringing her infant son Caesarion. During their time in Italy, Cleopatra and her son resided as official guests in Caesar's private villa, the Horti Caesaris. Some sources documented that Caesarion bore a physical resemblance to Julius Caesar. Mark Antony later testified before the Roman Senate that Caesar had privately acknowledged the boy as his biological son to his closest associates. However, Caesar never officially or legally recognized Caesarion as his legitimate heir under Roman law. One of Caesar's supporters, Gaius Oppius, wrote a pamphlet which attempted to prove that Caesar could not have fathered Caesarion. In 46 BC, Caesar dedicated the Temple of Venus Genetrix in the Forum Julium, honoring his family's mythological ancestor. Inside the temple, he placed a gilded statue of Cleopatra.

Julius Caesar was assassinated on 15 March 44 BC. When his final will was read, Caesarion was completely omitted from the document. Instead, Caesar posthumously adopted his grandnephew, Octavian, naming him as his primary heir.

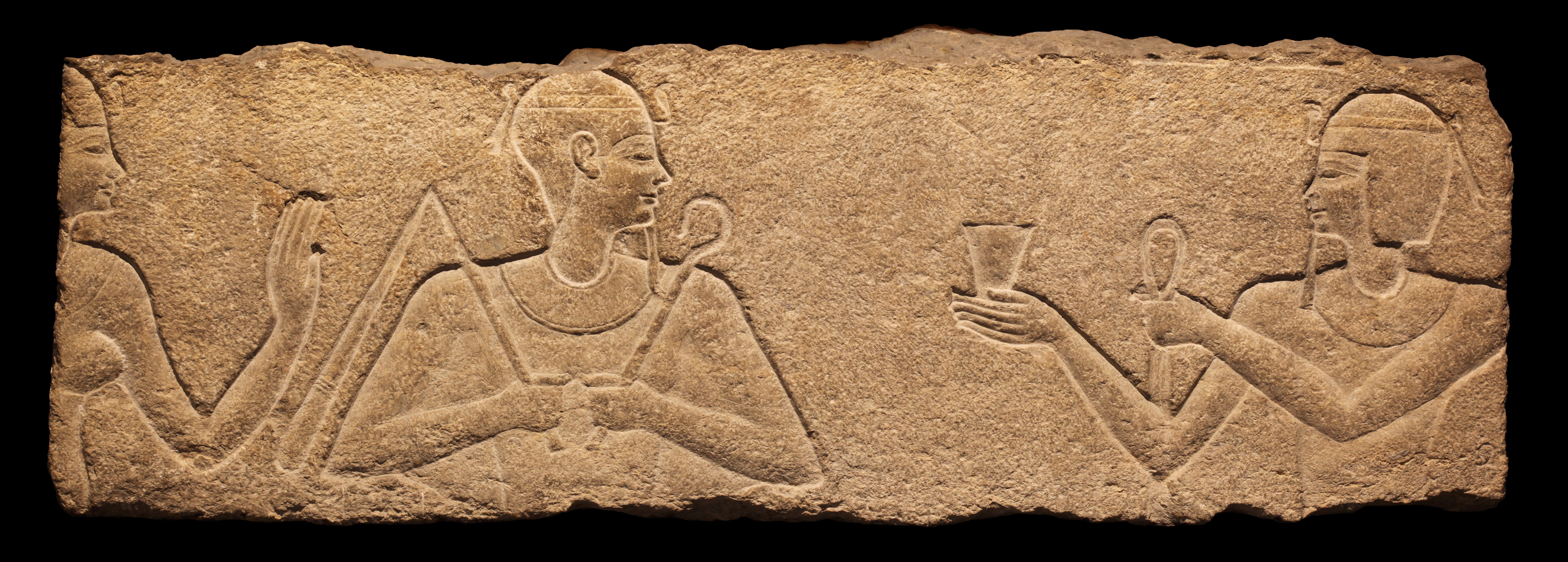
Caesarion making offerings to Egyptian Gods, while dressed in Pharaoh's regalia

Following Caesar's assassination, Cleopatra fled the city with the two-year-old Caesarion in mid-April 44 BC, returning to Alexandria. Shortly after their return to Egypt, Cleopatra's brother and nominal co-ruler, Ptolemy XIV, died. On 2 September 44 BC, at the age of three, Caesarion was officially proclaimed King of Egypt; although Cleopatra retained absolute autocratic authority.

Caesarion was assigned the royal epithets Theos Philopator Philometor ("The God Who Loves His Father and Mother"). Cleopatra utilized religious iconography, styling herself as the goddess Isis/Venus and presenting Caesarion as son Horus/Eros. The earliest extant physical depictions of Caesarion are found on Cypriot coinage minted in 44 BC, which portray him as an infant held in his mother's arms.

Cleopatra commissioned the construction of a birth house at the Temple complex of Montu in Armant. The temple's decorative reliefs depicted the divine birth of Caesarion.

== Pharaoh ==
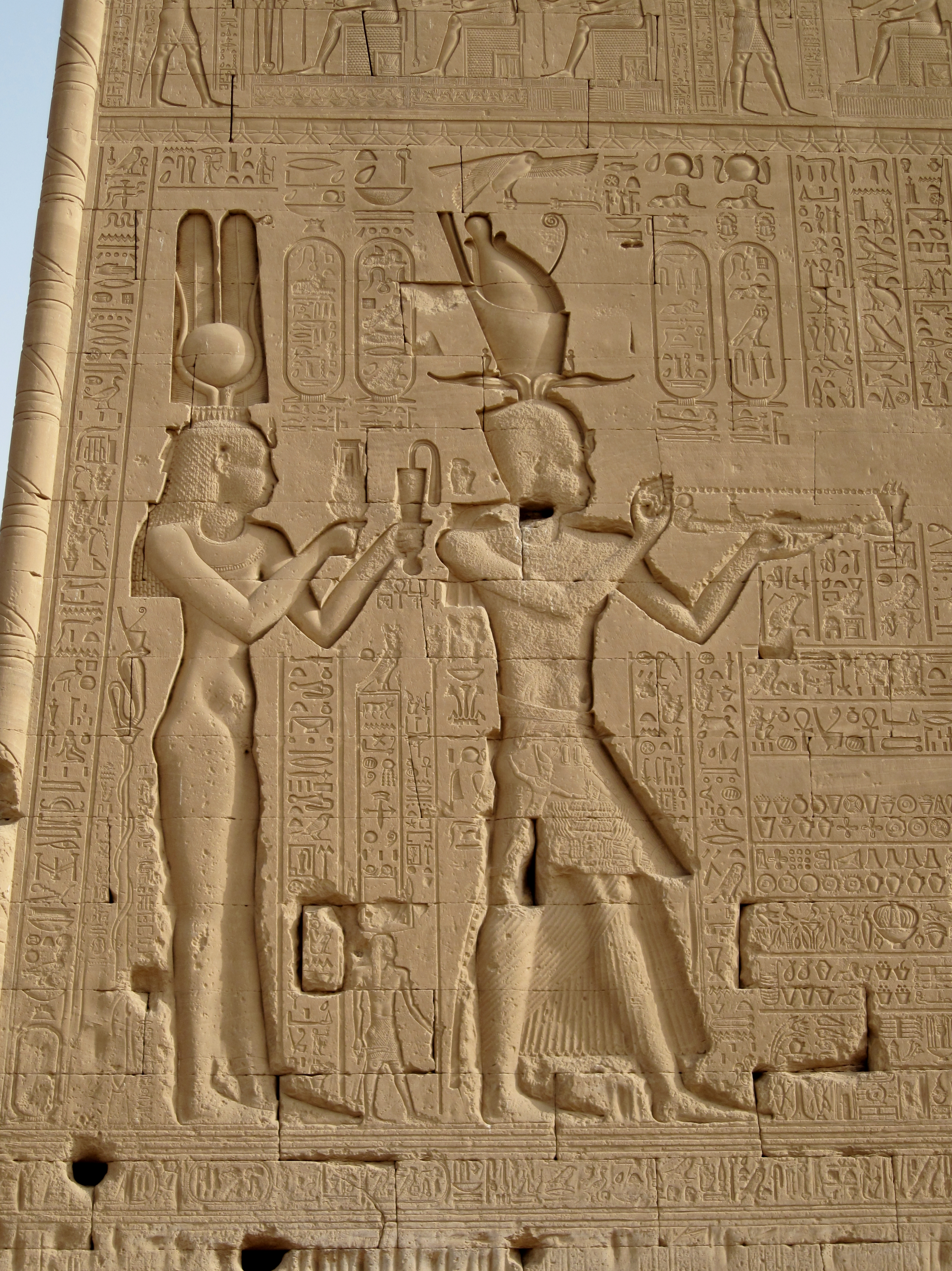
Caesarion and Cleopatra on a relief from Dendera Temple

Caesarion's formal co-regency with Cleopatra VII was recorded via double-dating systems in official state documentation.

In 34 BC, Antony granted further eastern lands and titles to Caesarion and his own three children with Cleopatra in the Donations of Alexandria. Caesarion was proclaimed to be a god, a son of [a] god, and "King of Kings". This grandiose title was "unprecedented in the management of Roman client-king relationships" and could be seen as "threatening the 'greatness' of the Roman people". Antony also declared Caesarion to be Caesar's true son and heir. This declaration was a direct threat to Octavian (whose claim to power was based on his status as Julius Caesar's grandnephew and adopted son). These proclamations partly caused the fatal breach in Antony's relations with Octavian, who used Roman resentment over the Donations to gain support for war against Antony and Cleopatra.

== Death ==
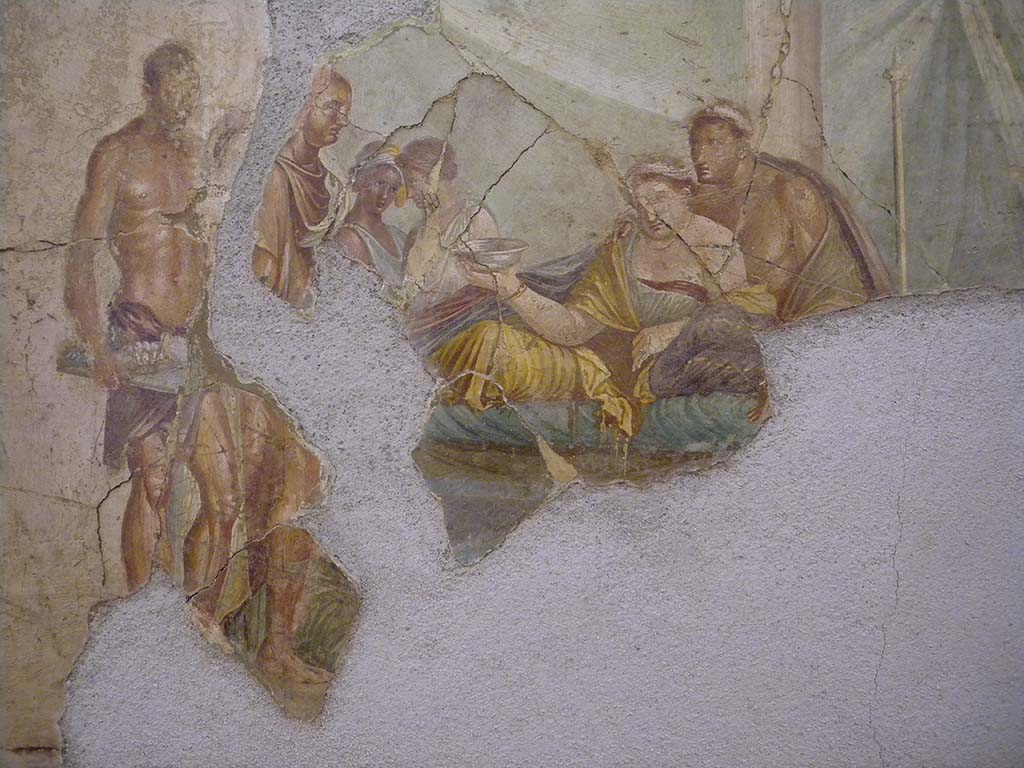
Roman painting from Pompeii, early 1st century AD, most likely depicting Cleopatra VII, wearing her royal diadem, taking poison in an act of suicide, while Caesarion, also wearing a royal diadem, stands behind her

After the defeat of Mark Antony and Cleopatra at the Battle of Actium in 31 BC, Cleopatra seems to have groomed Caesarion to take over as "sole ruler without his mother". She may have intended to go into exile, perhaps with Antony, who may have hoped that he would be allowed to retire peacefully as Lepidus had. Caesarion reappears in the historical record in 30 BC, when Octavian invaded Egypt and searched for him. Cleopatra may have sent Caesarion, 17 years old at the time, to the Red Sea port of Berenice for safety, possibly as part of plans for an escape to India. Plutarch does say that Caesarion was sent to India, but also that he was lured back by false promises of the kingdom of Egypt:

Caesarion, who was said to be Cleopatra's son by Julius Caesar, was sent by his mother, with much treasure, into India, by way of Ethiopia. There Rhodon, another tutor like Theodorus, persuaded him to go back, on the ground that [Octavian] Caesar invited him to take the kingdom.

Octavian captured the city of Alexandria on 1 August 30 BC, the date that marks the official annexation of Egypt to the Roman Republic. Eleven days later on 12 August 30 BC, Mark Antony and Cleopatra died, traditionally said to be by suicide.

Though Octavian may have temporarily considered permitting Caesarion to succeed his mother and rule Egypt (though now a smaller and weaker kingdom), he is supposed to have had Caesarion executed at age 17 in Alexandria in late August, possibly on 29 August 30 BC (the beginning of the Egyptian new year). According to Plutarch, he followed the advice of his companion Arius Didymus, who said "Too many Caesars is not good" (a pun on a line in Homer). Surviving information on the death of Caesarion is scarce. Octavian then assumed absolute control of Egypt. The year 30 BC was considered the first year of the new ruler's reign according to the traditional chronological system of Egypt.

== Depictions ==
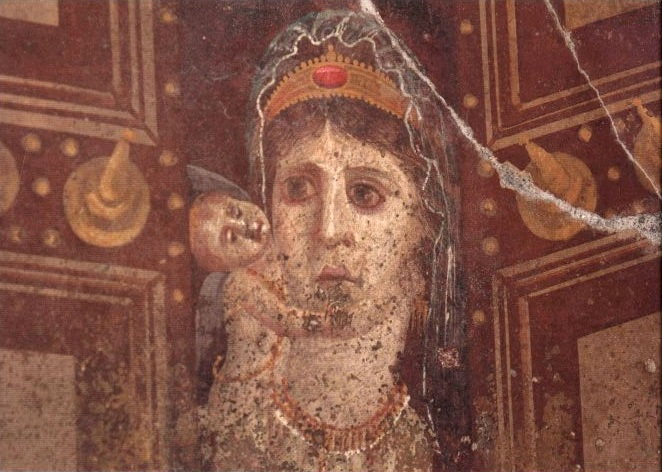
This mid-1st century AD Roman wall painting in Pompeii, Italy, showing Venus holding a cupid is most likely a depiction of Cleopatra VII of Ptolemaic Egypt as Venus Genetrix, with her son Caesarion as the cupid

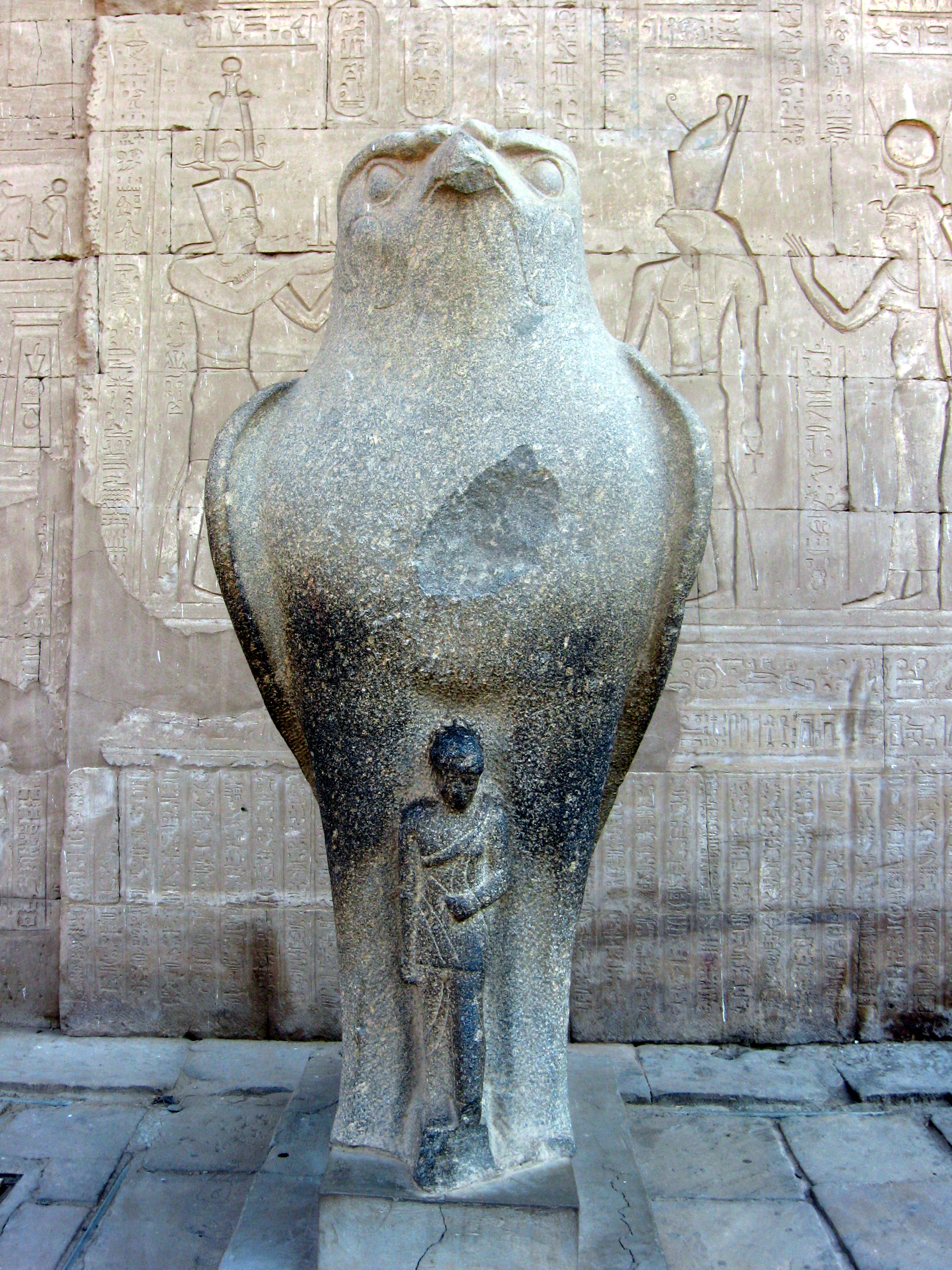
One of two statues of the falcon god Horus behind a smaller depiction of Caesarion at the Temple of Edfu in Edfu, Upper Egypt

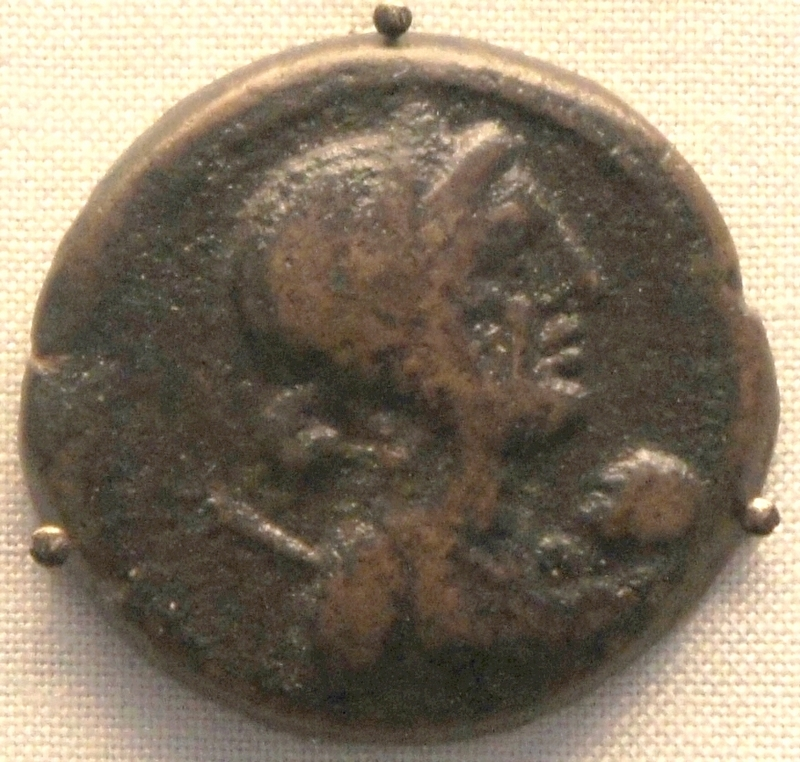
A coin depicting Cleopatra VII with her son Caesarion as an infant, British Museum

Few images of Caesarion survive. He is thought to be depicted in a partial statue found in the harbour of Alexandria in 1997 and is also portrayed twice in relief, as an adult pharaoh, with his mother on the Temple of Hathor at Dendera. His infant image appears on some bronze coins of Cleopatra.

== Egyptian names ==
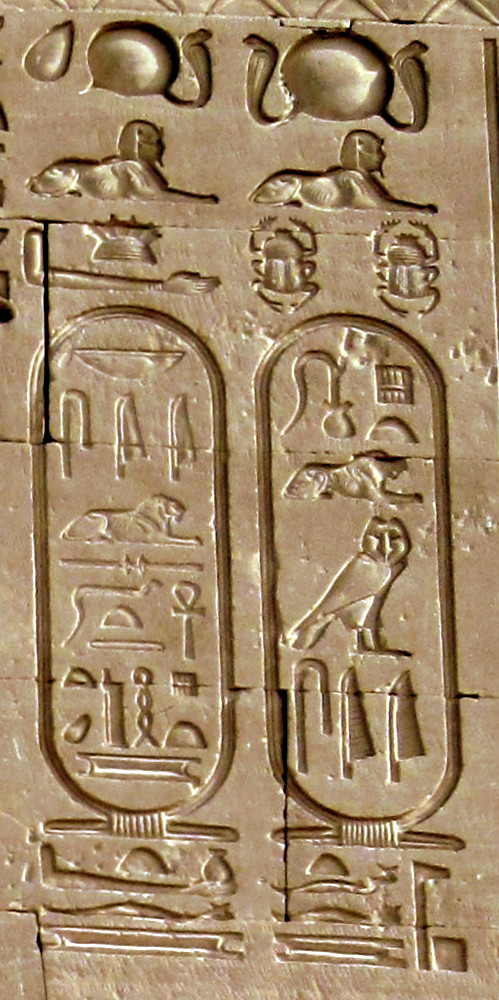
Cartouches of Caesarion in Hieroglyphics

In addition to his Greek name and nicknames, Caesarion also had a full set of royal names in the Egyptian language:

- Iwapanetjer entynehem – "Heir of the god who saves"
- Setepenptah – "Chosen of Ptah"
- Irmaatenre – "Carrying out the rule of Ra" or "Sun of righteousness"
- Sekhemankhamun – "Living image of Amun"

== See also ==
- Caesareum of Alexandria
- Julia gens
- Reign of Cleopatra
- List of unsolved murders (before the 20th century)
- Kaisarion (poem)

== Notes ==
Caesarion Ptolemaic dynasty Born: 47 BC Died: 30 BC
Preceded by Cleopatra VII Philopator	Pharaoh of Egypt; 44–30 BC with Cleopatra VII	Egypt annexed by Rome
