= A Young Man in a Hurry =

1904 short story collection by Robert W. Chambers

A Young Man in a Hurry is a collection of short stories by American writer Robert W. Chambers. A collection of light romantic tales in which Chambers' love of fishing and hunting and natural scenery prevails. The stories are set in America. The title story is a comedy of coincidence which has an atmospheric setting of nocturnal snow in New York.

== Table of contents ==
- "A Young Man in a Hurry"
- "A Pilgrim"
- "The Shining Band"
- "One Man in a Million"
- "The Fire-Warden"
- "The Market-Hunter"
- "The Path-Master"
- "In Nauvoo"
- "Marlett's Shoes"
- "Pasque Florida"

== Publication ==
The collection was originally published by Harper & Brothers, New York City, in 1904. It was published in Britain by Archibald Constable & Co Ltd, London in 1905.
