= Adolphe Maréchal =

Belgian opera singer

Adolphe (Alphonse) Maréchal (26 September 1867 – 1 February 1935) was a Belgian tenor whose career in the French and Italian repertoire took him to France and England.

== Life and career ==
Maréchal was born in Liège. Having studied at the Liège Conservatoire, Maréchal made his debut at Dijon in 1891 and toured the French provinces, singing in Rheims, Nice, Bordeaux, and especially at the Théâtre du Grand Cercle in Aix-les-Bains.

He was engaged by the Opéra-Comique in 1895, making his debut as Don José in Carmen on 7 October 1895. His repertoire at the Opéra-Comique covered Cavalleria Rusticana (Turriddu), Don Juan (don Ottavio), Les dragons de Villars (Sylvain), Joseph, Lakmé (Gérald), Manon (des Grieux), Mireille (Vincent), La Navarraise (Araquil), Le pardon de Ploërmel (Un faucheur), Les pêcheurs de perles (Nadir), Le pré aux clercs (Mergy) and Le roi d'Ys (Mylio). He also sang in several premieres, notably Louise in 1900 (Julien) and Grisélidis in 1901 (Alain), as well as enjoying a success in the Paris premiere of La Boheme (Rodolphe).

At the Opéra de Monte-Carlo he created the role of Jean in Le jongleur de Notre Dame in 1902, and made his debut at Covent Garden the same year as Don José, also appearing in Faust, Manon and the première of The Princess Osra by Herbert Bunning (1863-1937 ).

He retired back to Belgium in 1907, having made a handful of recordings. He died at Brussels, aged 67.
