= The Tree of Heaven =

Short story collection by Robert W. Chambers

The Tree of Heaven is a collection of short stories by Robert W. Chambers. Mostly set in New York with a snowy nocturnal backdrop, the stories are light and humorous romantic tales, several of which feature the weird.

Published in America by D. Appleton & Company, New York, 1907, with pictorial cloth design, and by Grosset & Dunlap, New York, 1907, with dark green cloth and pictorial paste-down. Published in Britain by Archibald Constable & Co. Ltd, London, in 1908. It contains illustrations by Henry Hutt, Howard Chandler Christy and A. B. Wenzell.

== Contents ==
- "The Carpet of Belshazzar"
- "The Sign of Venus"
- "The Case of Mr. Helmer"
- "The Tree of Dreams"
- "The Bridal Pair"
- "Ex Curia"
- "The Golden Pool"
- "Out of the Depths"
- "The Swastika"
- "The Ghost of Chance"
