= Tales of Two People =

Collection of short stories and novelettes by Anthony Hope

Tales of Two People is a collection of short stories and novelettes by Anthony Hope, the author better known as the writer of The Prisoner of Zenda. It was published in book form in 1907.

The stories included are as follows:

== "Helena’s Path" ==
Ambrose Calverley, who has travelled and adventured for many years, returns to England on the death of his father. Inheriting the title and estates of Lord Lynborough, he takes up residence at Scarsmore Castle on the coast of Yorkshire, with his friends Leonard 'Cromlech' Stubb, an ancient history researcher, and Roger Wibraham, his private secretary. Fond of sea bathing, he finds that the path to the beach, the 'Beach Path', which passes through the grounds of Nab Grange (formerly part of the Calverley estate), has been blocked off by the new owner, the widowed Anglo-Italian lady Helena, Marchesa di San Servolo. Although neither meet, a dispute begins between them concerning access to the path. Neither will give way, the lady is prepared to go to court and Lynborough calls her bluff. After a stalemate, Lynborough persuades his friends to pay court to the ladies staying with the Marchesa. Seeing her chance, she applies a similar strategy to Lynborough's companions, creating a wedge in his resolve. Persuaded by her lawyer that her legal case is very weak, the lady accepts a compromise presented to her by an 'embassy' sent by Lynborough. He demands the right to use the path, if she will allow him to visit her to present his 'homage' once a year on the day of St John Baptist. She graciously accepts. It is implied that they will eventually marry. And the Beach Path is renamed 'Helena's Path'.

== "Mrs Thistleton’s Princess" ==
The story is narrated by Tregaskis, a country gentleman, who is invited to the manor of Mr and Mrs Thistleton to meet the exiled Princess Vera of Boravia. Mr Thistleton, a lawyer, is negotiating for the return of the Princess's private fortune, but is unsuccessful. To pay off his fee, the impoverished princess is forced to accept the position of governess in the household, known simply as Fräulein Friedenburg. When a neighbour, an up-and-coming stockbroker, becomes engaged to the eldest daughter of the house, instead of the princess (as she had hoped), she is forced to leave. A respectable situation is found for her, but as she leaves, a revolution breaks out in her country. She travels to Vienna, with expenses paid by Tregaskis, who is the only one who actually believed her story. It transpires later that she has indeed become Queen of Boravia.

== "The Necessary Resources" ==
Prince Julian, pretender to the throne of a European country, is living in London with the mysterious Mrs Rivers. Byers, a financial speculator, is persuaded by her to provide support to the prince, but in fact contrives rumours that will cause the country's stock to rise and fall in value. In the end, the prince does not return to his country, but he does marry Mrs. Rivers. Byers makes a fortune and later stands for Parliament.

== "Miss Gladwin’s Chance" ==
Mr Foulkes, a solicitor, narrates the tale of Sir Thomas Gladwin of Worldstone Park, a rich country gentleman. A widower, he is engaged to Nettie Tyler, a girl many times younger than he is, and he has altered his Will in her favour. Four days before the wedding, he is killed in a horse riding accident. The Will has not been formalised and the estate goes to his daughter Beatrice, who had largely been cut out of her inheritance. She allows Nettie to remain on the estate with the uncertain status of 'companion'. A year later, Beatrice accedes to the unspoken feelings of the local 'county set' and makes over £100,000 in her favour. Shortly after, Nettie becomes engaged to neighbouring impoverished landowner Captain Spencer Fullard who had once paid court to Beatrice. She reveals to Foulkes that she did it to stop Fullard proposing marriage to herself.

== "The Prince Consort" ==
The narrator tells of the Clinton family. Mrs Clinton is a well-known novelist and a centre of literary society, whilst her husband is content to live in her shadow. He has let it be known that he also 'writes', but nothing much is known of what he writes. Eventually, a large two-volume work emerges and is taken up by his wife's publishers more as a favour than anything else. The work is an unexpected success and the gaze of the literary set turns from Mrs Clinton to her Husband.

== "What was expected of Miss Constantine" ==
Katherine Constantine is rich, pretty and the object of interest to two men; Valentine Hare of the Colonial Office, and Oliver Kirby, also in the government. She is proposed to by Hare, but she keeps him waiting for an answer. Family and friends all volunteer opinions and advice. She discusses the matter with a friend, Mr Wynne. When Hare is elevated to the Secretaryship for the Colonies, Miss Constantine decides to marry Kirby. They immediately leave for Canada, where Kirby hopes to enter politics.

== "Slim-Fingered Jim" ==
Gentleman thief James Walsh, known as Slim-Fingered Jim, has been convicted for involvement in a bond robbery and sentenced to seven years in prison. In a country house garden one evening, Mrs Pryce confides to a friend that she met Walsh several years previously on a ship travelling from America. She was much taken with his suave and debonair manner, even after he confessed to her his involvement in a swindle. He was later arrested but found not guilty. She hopes that he can tolerate his prison sentence.

== "The Grey Frock" ==
The Petheram family are landed gentry, but as a large family, their expenditure exceeds their income. One daughter has already married into the aristocracy, but Winifred chooses to become engaged to Harold Jackson, who has a small income only. Harold takes Winifred to London to see the house he proposes to rent for them. It is the best they can afford, but Winifred is horrified at the small size and dirtiness of the proposed home. She is even more horrified that Harold has ignored the new grey costume she has specially worn for the occasion. She breaks the engagement, and it is implied that she may marry a wealthy former suitor instead.

== "Foreordained" ==
One evening in a London club, The Colonel relates a story of a friend, George Langhorn, who inherited the ownership of Stretchleys, a high-class Savile Row tailor, but hates it. He is persuaded to take a break in Monte Carlo, where he meets the pretty and rich Miss Minnie Welford. It transpires that she has inherited half-ownership of a mass-production clothing company Sky-High Tailoring, which she also hates. The couple quickly become engaged and marry. One of the Colonel's listeners, a lawyer, then reveals that the week before, the companies amalgamated, with Langhorn as chairman of the joint concern.

== "Prudence and the Bishop" ==
Miss Prudence, eldest daughter of a vicar with a large family, is expected to marry money. She discusses with a friend the chances of her husband-to-be becoming a bishop.

== "The Opened Door" ==
A passenger on a sinking ship debates with himself whether or not to surrender to his fate. A scoundrel of some sort who has escaped trial and prison, he eventually drowns.

== "Love’s Logic" ==
In a short dramatic scene, a man who has just avoided proposing marriage, and a lady who has just refused a proposal, meet and discuss their various failures.

== "La Mort À La Mode" ==
Monsieur Le Duc and Madame La Marquise are being taken to their execution during the French Revolution. They exchange words and comfort each other before they mount the scaffold.

== "The Riddle of Countess Runa" ==
The walled city of Or is being besieged by King Stanislas, but the ruler of the city, Countess Runa, has held out and defied the King's angry demands. She claims that the city cannot be defeated until a riddle she has presented to him is solved. A prisoner is brought to her, who claims to be a renegade from the King's army. He is given sanctuary for seven days and nights and will be released if he has solved the riddle. On the final morning, he reveals himself to be the King, as Runa had known all along, and proposes a truce. And so peace reigns in the Kingdom.

== "The Lady and the Flagon" ==
The rich young Duke of Belleville (pronounced Bevvle) visits his villa near Hampstead Heath, but late at night, he feels lonely and bored. He bribes a passing policeman to change clothes with him and goes on patrol to check the doors and windows of his neighbours. Returning, he sees a young man outside his villa. He claims that he is the Duke of Belleville (pronounced Bevvle) who has lost his key. Intrigued, the real Duke assists the imposter to enter. It's soon clear that he knows about, and plans to steal, the valuable 'Queen Bess Flagon'. A young lady, clearly an accomplice, arrives in a brougham. The real Duke changes clothes back with the policeman, snatches the flagon and runs across the heath, chased by the imposter. The chasers are confronted by a real policeman, an inspector who lives nearby; he recognises the fake Duke of Belleville (pronounced Bevvle) as a confidence trickster and arrests him. The real Duke, heartily enlivened by the night's excitement, refuses to prefer charges and the would-be thief is allowed to go free. He graciously presents the flagon to the (still anonymous) lady and she also leaves.

== "The Duke’s Allotment" ==
The Duke, again bored with life, decides to take a small cottage and allotment in a country district and pass himself off as an out-of-work labourer. Unused to physical work, he is soon exhausted from his digging, and is visited by a formidable lady who believes him to be a drunkard. Affecting a Somersetshire accent, the Duke enjoys the deception. The lady sends her daughter to try to reform him. The house is later surrounded by other neighbours and police who have mistaken him for a thief believed to have burgled silver plate from a nearby manor house. The Duke takes to his heels, pursued by the local Chief Constable and others, but evades them. He returns home, accompanied by the lady, and resumes his true identity, much to her amusement.
