= La Nuit Espagnole (The Spanish Night) =

1922 painting by Francis Picabia

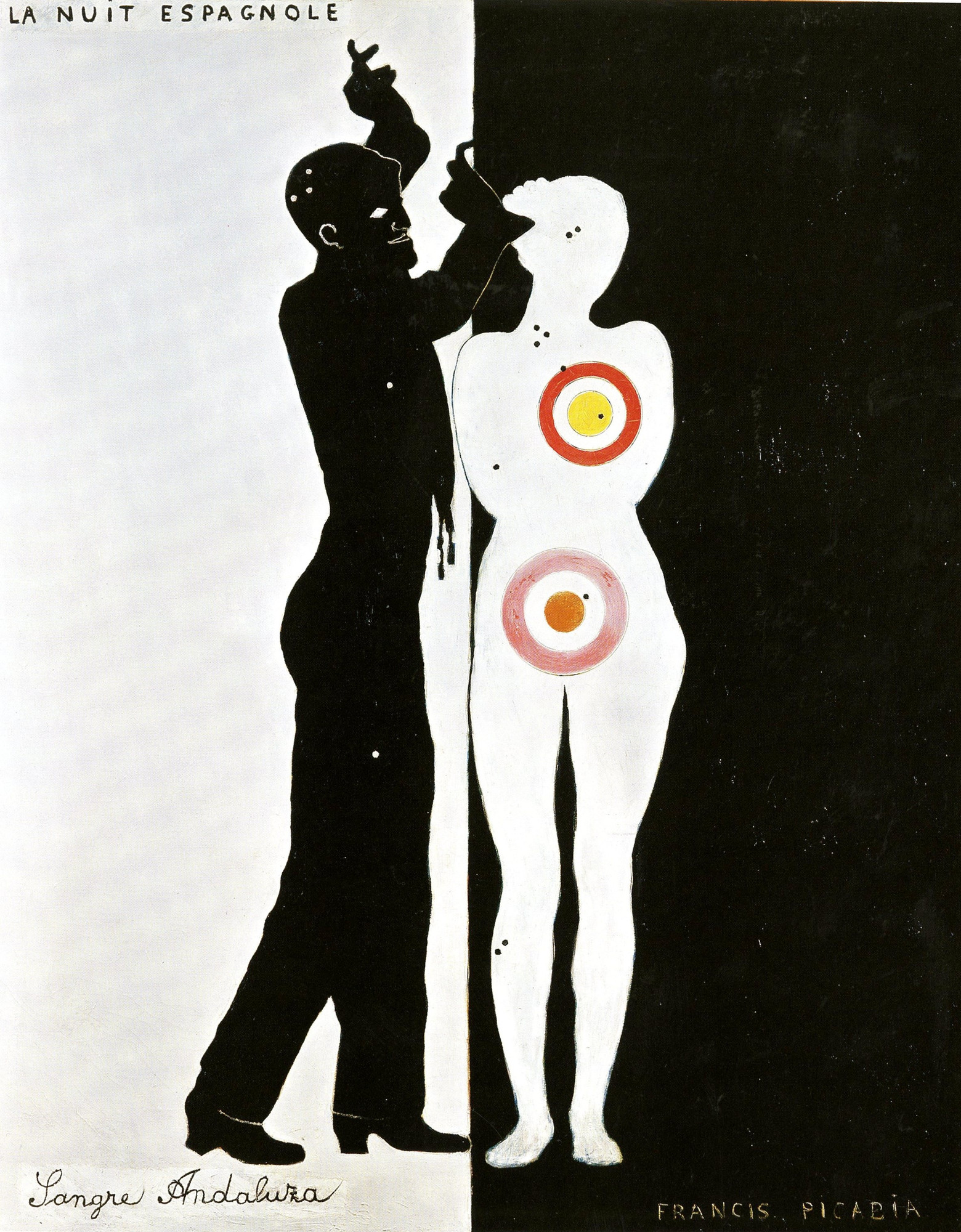
- Artist: Francis Picabia
- Year: 1922
- Medium: enamel on canvas
- Dimensions: 162.5 cm × 131 cm (64.0 in × 52 in)
- Location: Museum Ludwig; Cologne

La Nuit Espagnole (The Spanish Night) is an enamel on canvas painting by French artist Francis Picabia, created in 1922. It is held at the Museum Ludwig, in Cologne.

== Description and analysis ==
The painting is divided in two halves, each one depicts two black and white silhouettes, one male and the other female. The black silhouette of the man is on the left side, while the white silhouette of the woman is at the right side. On the left top of the canvas it reads the title "La Nuit Espagnole", in French. At the bottom left it reads "Sangre Andaluza" (Andalucian blood), in Spanish. The signature of the artist appears at the bottom right. The meaning of the work is complicated by the presence of two colored targets on the female figure, one at her chest and the other at her belly, but also by the strange position of the man, who raises his arms and hands open to her. It can be seen as representing a knife thrower, a banderilla planter or a fandango dancer.

== See also ==
- List of works by Francis Picabia
