= Kaisarion (poem) =

Greek poem by Constantine P. Cavafy

"Kaisarion" (Greek: Καισαρίων) is a Greek poem by Constantine P. Cavafy. It was written in December 1914, with the original title being "Of the Ptolemy Caesar." It was published four years later in 1918. The poem refers to the historical figure Kaisarion (also known as Ptolemy XV Caesar), the son of Julius Caesar and Cleopatra. This poem can be classified a historical poem in Cavafy's anthology.

== Story ==
"Kaisarion" takes place in the study of the poet, where he reminisces of the physicalities and youthfulness of this historical figure. The poet dives into the lost tragic history of the eldest son of Cleopatra. The abundance of information lost over time about Kaisarion made Cavafy's imagination run wild as this prince was a mystery to most people. He is seen as almost reminiscing about a boy who he felt he knew his whole life. The poet creates an image of what this young boy would look like from the way he spoke to the subtle way he moved and behaved.

This poem has underlying lonely as well as melancholic tones as the poet refers to his untimely and quick death, at the age of 17.

=== Excerpt ===
Original Greek	Transliteration	English Translation
Εν μέρει για να εξακριβώσω μια εποχή, εν μέρει και την ώρα να περάσω, την νύχτα χθες πήρα μια συλλογή επιγραφών των Πτολεμαίων να διαβάσω. Οι άφθονοι έπαινοι κ' η κολακείες εις όλους μοιάζουν. Ολοι είναι λαμπροί, ένδοξοι, κραταιοί, αγαθοεργοί; καθ' επιχείρησίς των σοφοτάτη. Αν πεις για τες γυναίκες της γενιάς, κι αυτές, όλες η Βερενίκες κ' η Κλεοπάτρες θαυμαστές.	En mérei gia na exakrivóso mia epochí, en mérei kai tin óra na peráso, tin nýchta chthes píra mia syllogí epigrafón ton Ptolemaíon na diaváso. Oi áfthonoi épainoi k' i kolakeíes eis ólous moiázoun. Oloi eínai lamproí, éndoxoi, krataioí, agathoergoí: kath' epicheírisís ton sofotáti. An peis gia tes gynaíkes tis geniás, ki aftés, óles i Vereníkes k' i Kleopátres thavmastés.	Partly to throw light on a certain period, partly to kill an hour or two, last night I picked up and read a volume of inscriptions about the Ptolemies. The lavish praise and flattery are much the same for each of them. All are brilliant, glorious, mighty, benevolent; everything they undertake is full of wisdom. As for the women of their line, the Berenices and Cleopatras, they too, all of them, are marvelous.
