= The Mystery of Choice =

1897 short story collection by Robert W. Chambers

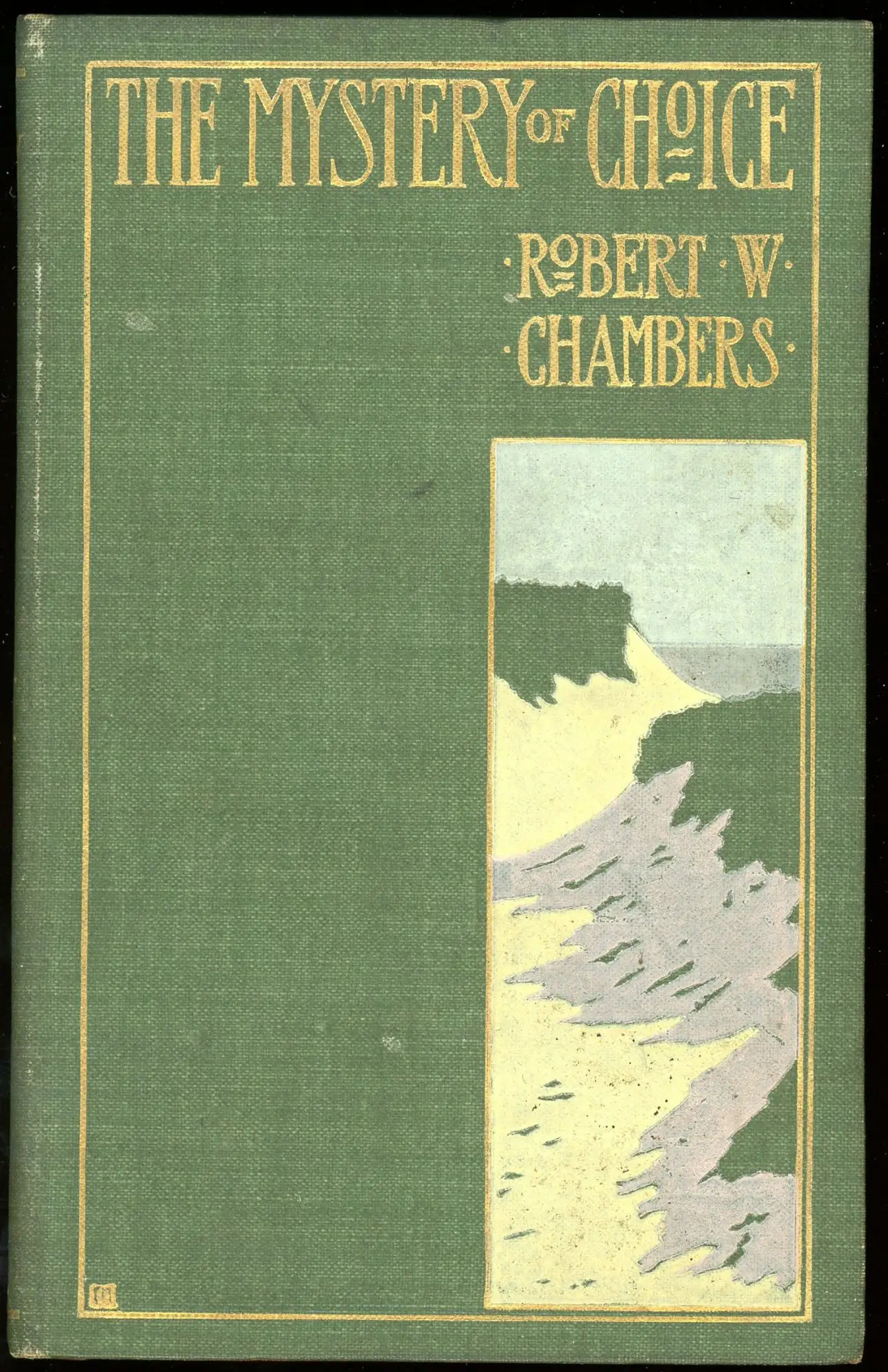
- First edition cover
- Author: Robert W. Chambers
- Language: English
- Genre: Macabre, Short story collection
- Publisher: D. Appleton & Company
- Publication date: 1897
- Publication place: United States
- Media type: Print (hardcover)
- Pages: 252
- Preceded by: The Red Republic
- Followed by: The Cambric Mask
- Text: The Mystery of Choice at Wikisource

The Mystery of Choice is a collection of short stories by American writer Robert W. Chambers, published by D. Appleton in 1897. Distinguished by an atmospheric use of natural scenery, the stories are mostly set in French region of Brittany. The macabre and eerie feature throughout, and the first three stories feature the same protagonist, acting as follow-up to each other. The last story was later incorporated into the episodic novel In Search of the Unknown. The first edition omitted the title of "The Key to Grief" in its contents list.

== Contents ==
- "The Purple Emperor" – The first of three stories featuring protagonist Dick Darrel, an American living in Brittany; the tale of the bitter rivalry between two butterfly collectors.
- "Pompe Funebre" – The short story of Dick observing a sexton beetle.
- "The Messenger" – The third and last story to feature Dick, as he fears that he might be targeted by a dead priest's curse.
- "The White Shadow" – Two cousins suffer a tragic accident and become ghost-like figures, continuing their new existence together.
- "Passeur" – the short tale of a man who feels like his surroundings have changed eerily.
- "The Key to Grief" – the tale of a man seeking to escape lynching by hiding on an uncanny island.
- "A Matter of Interest" – the tale of a hunt for the remains of a previously unknown creature.
- "Envoy" – A sixteen-part poem about forgiveness.
