= The Prisoner of Zenda (disambiguation) =

The Prisoner of Zenda is an 1894 adventure novel by Anthony Hope.

The Prisoner of Zenda may also refer to one of its many film adaptations:

- The Prisoner of Zenda (1913 film), with James Keteltas Hackett and Beatrice Beckley
- The Prisoner of Zenda (1915 film), starring Henry Ainley and Jane Gail
- The Prisoner of Zenda (1922 film), featuring Lewis Stone and Alice Terry
- The Prisoner of Zenda (1937 film), starring Ronald Colman and Madeleine Carroll
- The Prisoner of Zenda (1952 film), with Stewart Granger and Deborah Kerr
- The Prisoner of Zenda (1979 film), featuring Peter Sellers and Lynne Frederick
- Prisoner of Zenda (1988 film), animated film produced in Australia

For a comprehensive list of other adaptations (stage, radio, TV, operetta, books, etc.), see The Prisoner of Zenda#Adaptations.
