= The Double World (Picabia) =

Painting by Francis Picabia

- Le Double Monde (French)
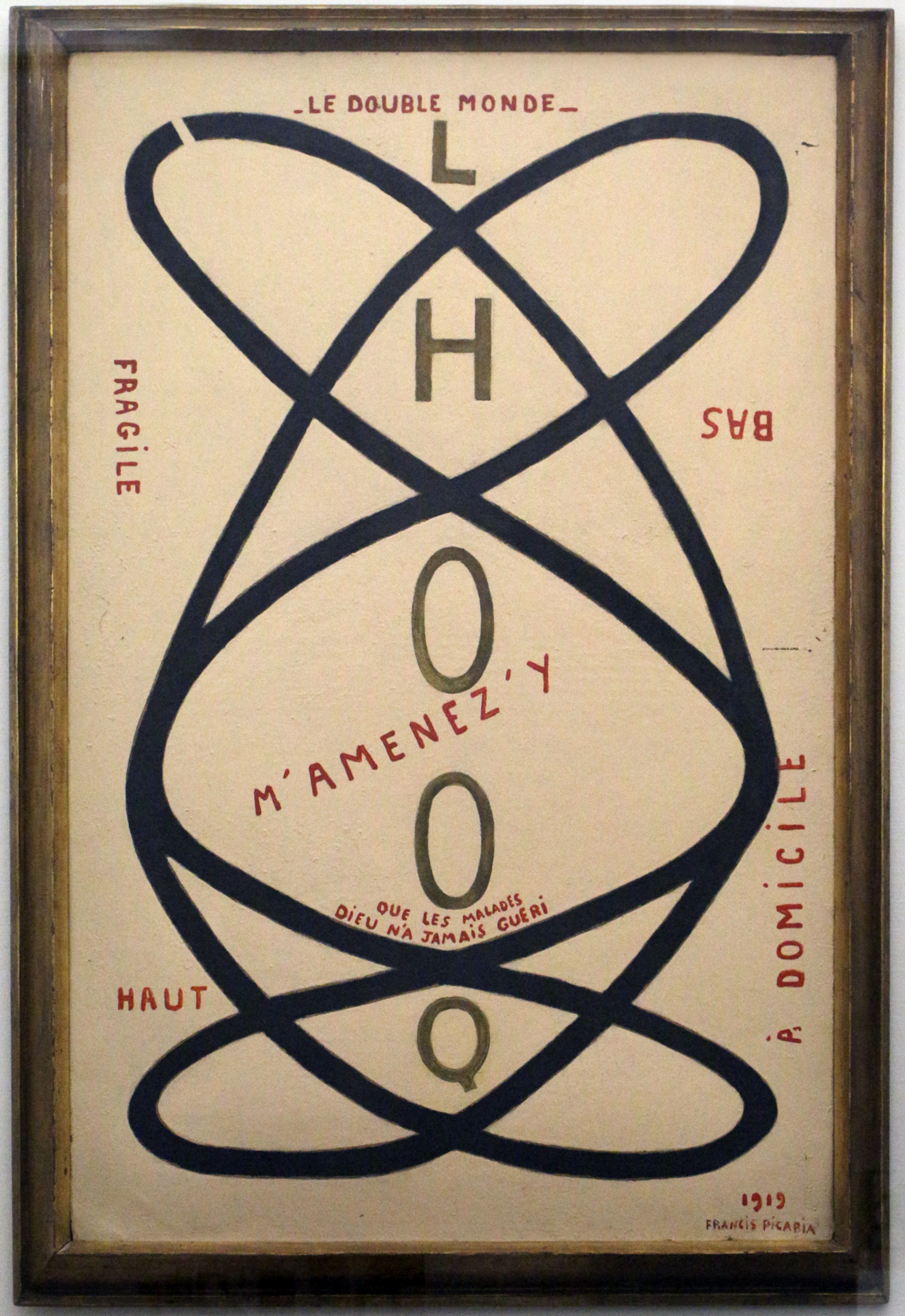
- Artist: Francis Picabia
- Year: 1919
- Medium: enamel and oil on cardboard
- Dimensions: 132 cm × 85 cm (52 in × 33 in)
- Location: Musée National d'Art Moderne; Paris

The Double World is an enamel and oil on cardboard painting by the French painter Francis Picabia, created in December 1919. It has been held in the Musée National d'Art Moderne, in Paris.

== History and description ==
Picabia was involved in the Dada movement. This provocative painting represents the letters "LHOOQ" inscribed vertically in black rings on a brown background, where more marginal textual indications take the form of the handling instructions that can be found on a cardboard box. This painting was inspired by L.H.O.O.Q., the famous work by Marcel Duchamp which parodies the Mona Lisa through an obscene pun. Picabia had rejected cubism after World War I, embrancing the apparent anti-art movement of dada, and his second exhibition of the Section d'Or, in 1920, shows his new artistic experiments. Picabia claimed that his geometric studies were capable of creating works in accordance with a universal harmony, inspired by Leonardo da Vinci.

Didier Ottinger states that "Just as Duchamp's Mona Lisa juxtaposes the image of the "mental thing" and the reminder of a very real physiology, The Double World (...) brings the symbol closer to a speculative, esoteric art (the golden ratio) and reminders of the prosaic materiality of the paintings (“high”, “low”, “fragile”...). Through this telescoping, Francis Picabia denounces the tartuffery of painters who are followers of what he calls, from then on, the “bronze section”.

This painting was for a long time in the private collection of leading surrealist André Breton.

== See also ==
- List of works by Francis Picabia
