= Anthony Hope =

English novelist (1863-1933)

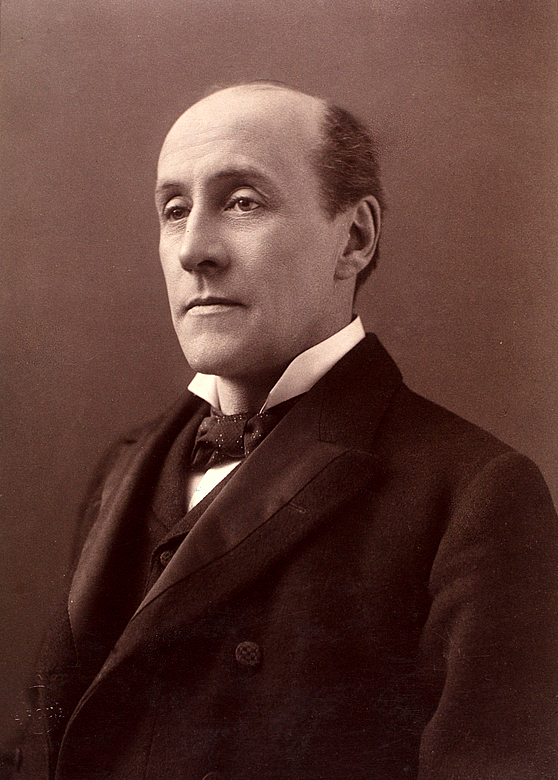
- Hope, 1880–1898
- Born: Anthony Hope Hawkins; 9 February 1863; Clapton, London, England
- Died: 8 July 1933 (aged 70); Walton-on-the-Hill, Surrey, England
- Education: St John's School, Leatherhead; Marlborough College; Balliol College, Oxford
- Occupations: Barrister; Writer
- Notable work: The Prisoner of Zenda; Rupert of Hentzau

Signature
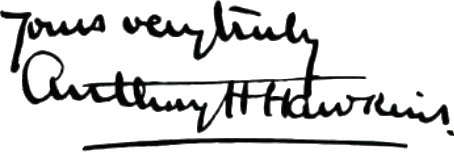

Sir Anthony Hope Hawkins (9 February 1863 – 8 July 1933), better known as Anthony Hope, was a British novelist and playwright. He was a prolific writer, especially of adventure novels but he is remembered predominantly for only two books: The Prisoner of Zenda (1894) and its sequel Rupert of Hentzau (1898).

These works, "minor classics" of English literature, are set in the contemporaneous fictional country of Ruritania and spawned the genre known as Ruritanian romance, books set in fictional European locales similar to the novels. Zenda has inspired many adaptations, most notably the 1937 Hollywood movie of the same name and the 1952 version.

== Early career and Zenda ==
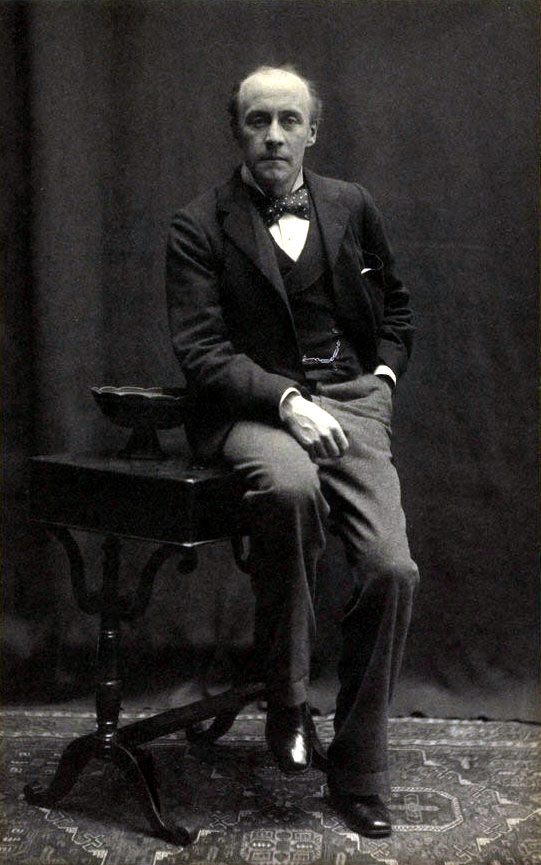
Anthony Hope Hawkins by Zaida Ben-Yusuf, 1897

Hope was educated at St John's School, Leatherhead, Marlborough College and Balliol College, Oxford. In an academically distinguished career at Oxford he obtained first-class honours in Classical Moderations (Literis Graecis et Latinis) in 1882 and in Literae Humaniores ("Greats") in 1885.

Hope trained as a lawyer and barrister, being called to the Bar by the Middle Temple in 1887. He served his pupillage under the future Liberal Prime Minister H. H. Asquith, who thought him a promising barrister and who was disappointed by his decision to turn to writing.

Hope had time to write, as his working day was not overfull during these early years and he lived with his widowed father, then Rector of St Bride's Church, Fleet Street. His short pieces appeared in periodicals but for his first book, he was forced to resort to a self-publishing press. A Man of Mark (1890) is notable primarily for its similarities to Zenda: it is set in an imaginary country, Aureataland, and features political upheaval and humour. More novels and short stories followed, including Father Stafford in 1891 and the mildly successful Mr Witt's Widow in 1892. He stood as the Liberal candidate for Wycombe in the election of 1892 but was not elected.

In 1893, he wrote three novels (Sport Royal, A Change of Air and Half-a-Hero) and a series of sketches that first appeared in The Westminster Gazette and were collected in 1894 as The Dolly Dialogues, illustrated by Arthur Rackham.

Dolly was his first major literary success. A. E. W. Mason deemed these conversations "so truly set in the London of their day that the social historian would be unwise to neglect them," and said that they were written with "delicate wit [and] a shade of sadness."

The idea for Hope's tale of political intrigue, The Prisoner of Zenda, being the history of three months in the life of an English gentleman, came to him at the close of 1893 as he was walking in London. Hope finished the first draft in a month and the book was in print by April. The story is set in the fictional European kingdom of 'Ruritania', a term which has come to mean "the novelist's and dramatist's locale for court romances in a modern setting." Zenda achieved instant success and its witty protagonist, the debonair Rudolf Rassendyll, became a well-known literary creation. The novel was praised by Mason, literary critic Andrew Lang, and Robert Louis Stevenson.

The popularity of Zenda persuaded Hope to give up the "brilliant legal career [that] seemed to lie ahead of him" to become a full-time writer but he "never again achieved such complete artistic success as in this one book." Also in 1894, Hope produced The God in the Car, a political story, which the late nineteenth-century English novelist George Gissing thought was "of course vastly inferior to what I had supposed from the reviews".

== Later years ==
Hope wrote 32 volumes of fiction over the course of his lifetime and he had a large popular following. In 1896 he published The Chronicles of Count Antonio, followed in 1897 by a tale of adventure set on a Greek island, entitled Phroso. He went on a publicity tour of the United States in late 1897, during which he impressed a New York Times reporter as being somewhat like Rudolf Rassendyll: a well-dressed Englishman with a hearty laugh, a soldierly attitude, a dry sense of humour, "quiet, easy manners", and an air of shrewdness.

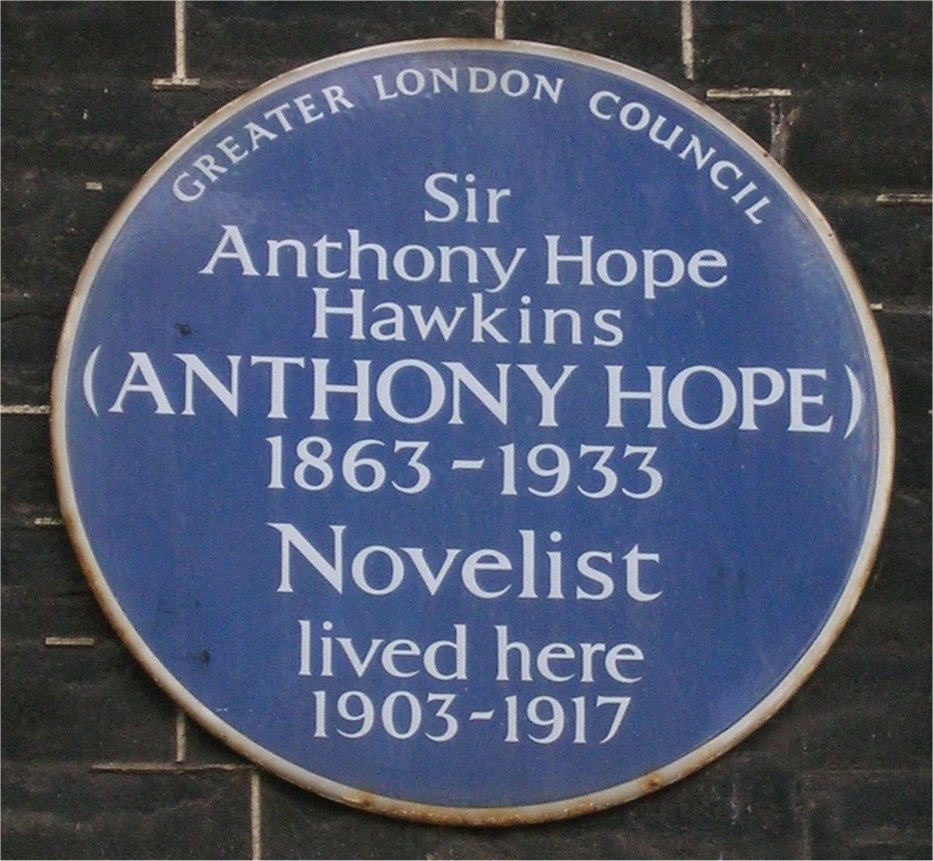
Blue plaque in Bedford Square, London

In 1898, he wrote Simon Dale, a historical novel involving actress and courtesan Nell Gwyn. Marie Tempest appeared in the dramatisation, called English Nell. One of Hope's plays, The Adventure of Lady Ursula, was produced in 1898. This was followed by his novel The King's Mirror (1899), which Hope considered one of his best works; and Captain Dieppe (1899). In 1900, he published Quisanté and he was elected chairman of the committee of the Society of Authors. He wrote Tristram of Blent in 1901, The Intrusions of Peggy in 1902, and Double Harness in 1904, followed by A Servant of the Public in 1905, about the love of acting.

In 1906, he produced Sophy of Kravonia, a novel in a similar vein to Zenda which was serialised in The Windsor Magazine; Roger Lancelyn Green is especially damning of this effort. Nevertheless, the story was filmed twice, in Italy in 1916 as Sofia De Kravonia, and in the United States in 1920 as Sophy of Kravonia or, The Virgin of Paris. Both adaptations featured the actress Diana Karenne in the title role (billed as "Diana Kareni" in the latter film).

In 1907, a collection of his short stories and novelettes was published under the title Tales of Two People; as well as the novel Helena's Path. In 1910, he wrote Second String, followed by Mrs Maxon Protests the next year.

Hope wrote and co-wrote many plays and political non-fiction during the First World War, some under the auspices of the Ministry of Information. Later publications included The Secret of the Tower, and Beaumaroy Home from the Wars, in 1919 and Lucinda in 1920. Lancelyn Green asserts that Hope was "a first-class amateur but only a second-class professional writer.

== Personal life ==
Hope married Elizabeth Somerville (1885/6–1946) in 1903 and they had two sons and a daughter. He was knighted in 1918 for his contribution to propaganda efforts during World War I.

He published an autobiographical book, Memories and Notes, in 1927.

== Death ==
Hope died of throat cancer at the age of 70 (1933) at his country home, Heath Farm at Walton-on-the-Hill in Surrey. There is a blue plaque on his house in Bedford Square, London.

== Bibliography ==
=== The Ruritanian Trilogy ===
1. The Heart of Princess Osra, 1896 – a fix-up novel containing 9 linked short stories
2. The Prisoner of Zenda: being the history of three months in the life of an English gentleman, 1894.
3. Rupert of Hentzau: being the sequel to a story by the same writer entitled the Prisoner of Zenda, 1898.

=== Other works ===
- A Man of Mark, 1890.
- Father Stafford, 1891.
- Mr Witt's Widow: A Frivolous Tale, 1892.
- A Change of Air, 1893.
- Half a Hero, 1893.
- Sport Royal and other stories, 1893.
- The Dolly Dialogues, 1894.
- The God in the Car, 1894.
- The Indiscretion of the Duchess: being a story concerning two ladies, a nobleman, and a necklace, 1894.
- The Chronicles of Count Antonio, 1895.
- Comedies of Courtship, 1896.
- Phroso: A Romance, 1897.
- Simon Dale, 1898.
- The King's Mirror, 1899.
- Quisanté, 1900.
- Tristram of Blent: an episode in the story of an ancient house, 1901.
- The Intrusions of Peggy, 1902.
- Double Harness, 1904.
- A Servant of the Public, 1905.
- Sophy of Kravonia, 1906.
- Tales of Two People, 1907.
- The Great Miss Driver, 1908.
- Love's Logic and other stories, 1908.
- Dialogue, 1909.
- Second String, 1910.
- Mrs Maxon Protests, 1911.
- Helena's Path, 1912.
- The New (German) Testament: some texts and a commentary, 1914.
- Militarism, German and British, 1915.
- A Young Man's Year, 1915.
- Why Italy is with the Allies, 1917.
- Captain Dieppe, 1918.
- Beaumaroy Home from the Wars, 1919.
- Lucinda, 1920.
- Little Tiger: A Novel, 1925.
- Memories and Notes, 1927.

== See also ==
- Assassinations in fiction
