= The King in Yellow =

1895 short story collection by Robert W. Chambers

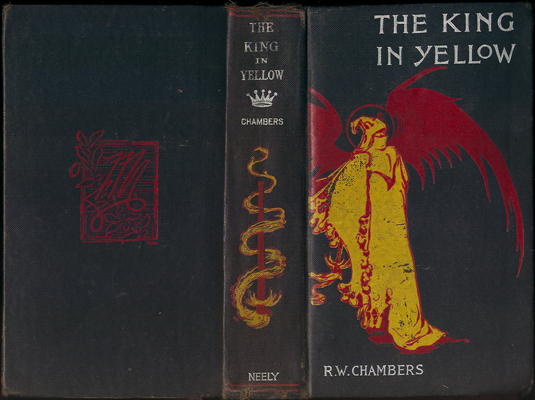
- Cover of an 1895 edition
- Author: Robert W. Chambers
- Language: English
- Genre: Decadent literature, horror, supernatural, weird, romance
- Publisher: F. Tennyson Neely
- Publication date: 1895
- Publication place: United States
- Media type: Print
- Pages: 316
- Dewey Decimal: 813.4
- LC Class: PZ3. C355
- Followed by: The Maker of Moons
- Text: The King in Yellow at Wikisource

The King in Yellow is a short story collection by American writer Robert W. Chambers, first published by F. Tennyson Neely in 1895. The British first edition was published by Chatto & Windus in 1895 (316 pages).

The book contains nine short stories and a sequence of poems; while the first stories belong to the genres of supernatural horror and weird fiction, The King in Yellow progressively transitions towards a more light-hearted tone, ending with romantic stories devoid of horror or supernatural elements. The horror stories are highly esteemed, and it has been described by critics such as E. F. Bleiler, S. T. Joshi, and T. E. D. Klein as a classic in the field of the supernatural. Lin Carter called it "an absolute masterpiece, probably the single greatest book of weird fantasy written in this country between the death of Poe and the rise of Lovecraft", and it was an influence on Lovecraft himself.

The book is named for the eponymous play within the stories that recurs as a motif through the first four stories, a forbidden play that induces madness in those who read it.

== Stories ==
The first four stories are loosely connected by three main devices:

- A play in book form titled The King in Yellow
- A mysterious and malevolent supernatural and gothic entity known as the King in Yellow
- An eerie symbol called the Yellow Sign

These stories are macabre in tone, centering, in keeping with the other tales, on characters who are often artists or decadents, inhabitants of the demi-monde.

The first and fourth stories, "The Repairer of Reputations" and "The Yellow Sign", are set in America, whereas the second and third stories, "The Mask" and "In the Court of the Dragon", are set in Paris. These stories are haunted by the theme: "Have you found the Yellow Sign?"

The macabre character gradually fades away during the remaining stories, and the last three are written in the romantic fiction style common to Chambers's later work. They are all linked to the preceding stories by their Parisian setting and their artistic protagonists.

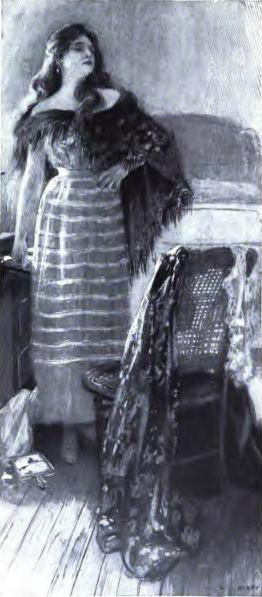
Illustration of Tessie in "The Yellow Sign", from a 1902 edition of the book.

The stories in the book are:

- "The Repairer of Reputations" – a story of egotism and paranoia which carries the imagery of the book's title.
- "The Mask" – a dream story of art, love, and uncanny science.
- "In the Court of the Dragon" – a man is pursued by a sinister church organist who is after his soul.
- "The Yellow Sign" – an artist is troubled by a sinister churchyard watchman who resembles a coffin worm.
- "The Demoiselle d'Ys" – a time travel love story.
- "The Prophets' Paradise" – a sequence of eerie prose poems that develop the style and theme of a quotation from the fictional play The King in Yellow that introduces "The Mask".
- "The Street of the Four Winds" – an atmospheric tale of an artist in Paris who is drawn to a neighbor's room by a cat; the story ends with a tragic touch.
- "The Street of the First Shell" – a war story set during the Siege of Paris (1870–1871).
- "The Street of Our Lady of the Fields" – romantic American bohemians in Paris.
- "Rue Barrée" – romantic American bohemians in Paris, with a discordant ending that playfully reflects some of the tone of the first story.

== Inspirations for The King in Yellow ==
Chambers borrowed the names Carcosa, Hali and Hastur from Ambrose Bierce: specifically, his short stories "An Inhabitant of Carcosa" and "Haïta the Shepherd". There is no strong indication that Chambers was influenced beyond liking the names. For example, Hastur is a god of shepherds in "Haïta the Shepherd", but is implicitly a location in "The Repairer of Reputations", listed alongside the Hyades and Aldebaran.

Brian Stableford has pointed out that the story "The Demoiselle d'Ys" was influenced by the stories of Théophile Gautier, such as "Arria Marcella" (1852); both Gautier and Chambers's stories feature a love affair enabled by a supernatural time slip.

== Legacy and influence ==
H. P. Lovecraft read The King in Yellow in early 1927 and included passing references to various things and places from the book, such as the Lake of Hali and the Yellow Sign, in "The Whisperer in Darkness" (1931).

The first season of True Detective, a 2014 American anthology crime drama television series created by Nic Pizzolatto, references a figure called "the Yellow King". Allusions to The King in Yellow can be observed in the show's dark philosophy, its recurring use of "Carcosa" and "The Yellow King" as motifs throughout the series, and its symbolic use of yellow as a thematic signature that signifies insanity and decadence.
