= Robert W. Chambers =

American artist and author (1865–1933)

Robert William Chambers
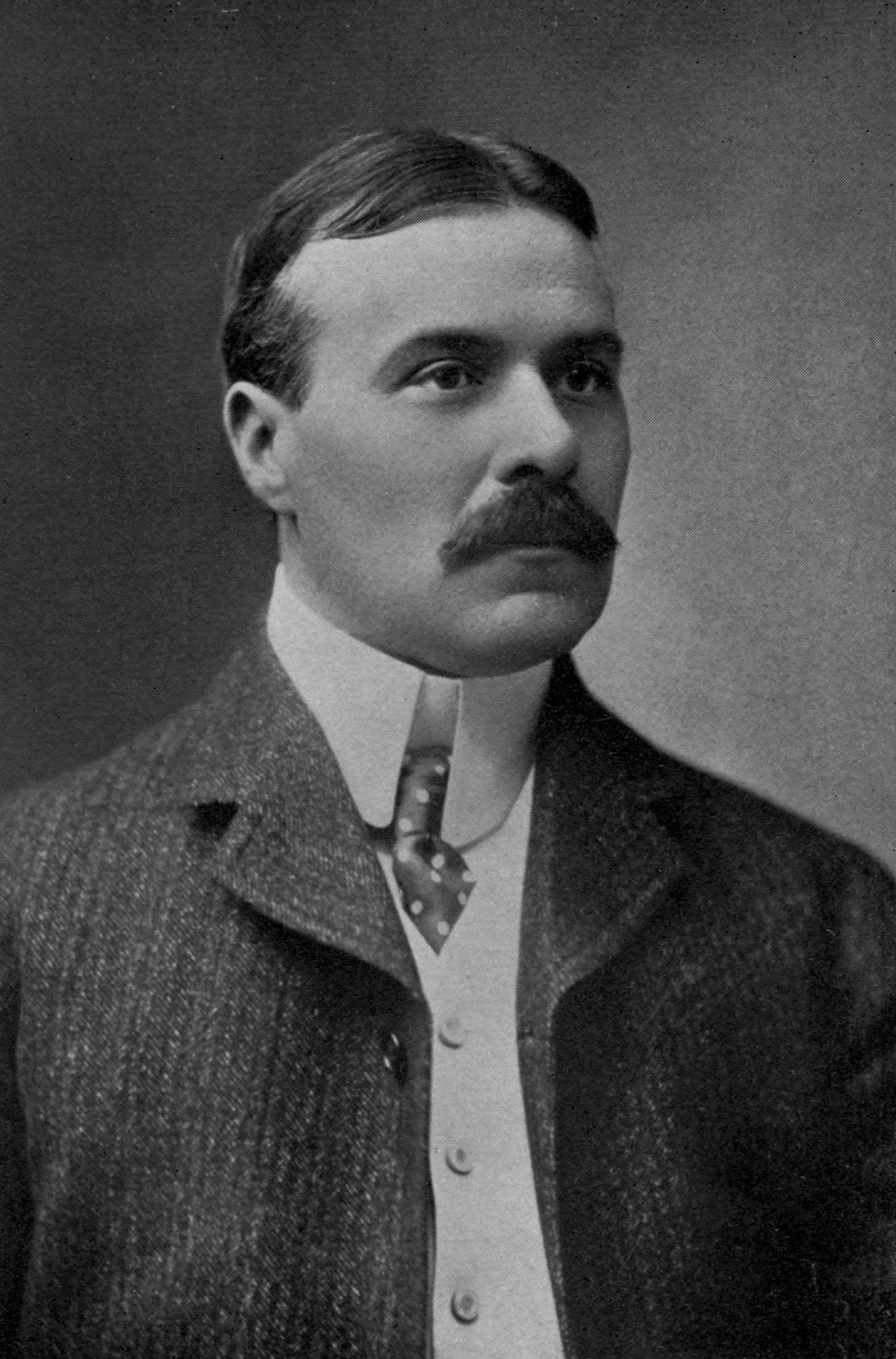
- Chambers in 1903
- Born: Robert William Chambers; May 26, 1865; Brooklyn, New York, U.S.
- Died: December 16, 1933 (aged 68); New York City, U.S.
- Occupations: Novel and short story author
- Spouse: Elsa Vaughn Moller (m. 1898)
- Children: 1
- Writing career
- Genres: Art Nouveau, decadent literature, fantasy, historical fiction, horror, romance, science fiction, supernatural
- Notable work: The King in Yellow

Robert William Chambers (May 26, 1865 – December 16, 1933) was an American artist and fiction writer, best known for his book of short stories titled The King in Yellow, published in 1895.

== Early life ==
Chambers was born in Brooklyn, New York, to William P. Chambers (1827–1911), a corporate and bankruptcy lawyer, and Caroline Smith Boughton (1842–1913). His parents met when his mother was twelve years old and William P. was interning with her father, Joseph Boughton, a prominent corporate lawyer. Eventually the two formed the law firm of Chambers and Boughton which continued to prosper even after Joseph's death in 1861. Robert Chambers's great-grandfather, William Chambers (birth unknown), a lieutenant in the British Royal Navy, was married to Amelia Saunders (1765–1822), a great-granddaughter of Tobias Saunders of Westerly, Rhode Island. The couple moved from Westerly to Greenfield, Massachusetts, and then to Galway, New York, where their son, also named William Chambers (1798–1874), was born. The second William graduated from Union College at the age of 18, and then went to a college in Boston, where he studied medicine. Upon graduating, he and his wife, Eliza P. Allen (1793–1880), a direct descendant of Roger Williams, the founder of Providence, Rhode Island, were among the first settlers of Broadalbin, New York. His brother was the architect Walter Boughton Chambers.

Chambers was first educated at the Brooklyn Polytechnic Institute, and then entered the Art Students' League at around the age of twenty, where the artist Charles Dana Gibson was a fellow student. Chambers studied in Paris at the École des Beaux-Arts and the Académie Julian from 1886 to 1893, and his work was displayed at the Salon as early as 1889.

== Career ==
On his return to New York, he succeeded in selling his illustrations to Life, Truth, and Vogue magazines. Then, for reasons unclear, he devoted his time to writing, producing his first novel, In the Quarter, written in 1887 in Munich. His most famous effort is The King in Yellow, a collection of short stories published in 1895. This included several famous weird short stories that are connected by the theme of a fictitious drama of the same title, which drives those who read it insane. E. F. Bleiler described The King in Yellow as one of the most important works of American supernatural fiction. The story was also strongly admired by H. P. Lovecraft and his circle.

Chambers returned to the weird genre in his later short story collections The Maker of Moons, The Mystery of Choice and The Tree of Heaven, but none matched the success or acclaim of The King in Yellow. Some of Chambers's work contains elements of science fiction, such as In Search of the Unknown (1904) and Police!!! (1915), about a zoologist who encounters monsters. Lovecraft expressed admiration for Chambers's story "The Harbor Master" (from In Search of the Unknown) which probably influenced "The Shadow Over Innsmouth" (1931).

Chambers's main work of historical fiction was a series of novels set during the Franco-Prussian War. These novels were The Red Republic (1895, centring on the Paris Commune), Lorraine (1898), Ashes of Empire (1898) and Maids of Paradise (1903). Chambers wrote Special Messenger (1909), Ailsa Paige (1910) and Whistling Cat (1932), novels set during the American Civil War. Chambers also wrote Cardigan (1901), a historical novel for younger readers, set at the outbreak of the American Revolution. Chambers later turned to writing romantic fiction to earn a living. According to some estimates, Chambers had one of the most successful literary careers of his period, his later novels selling well and a handful achieving best-seller status. Chambers' romance novels often featured intimate relationships between "caddish" men and sexually willing women, resulting in some reviewers accusing Chambers' works of promoting "immorality." Many of his works were also serialised in magazines.

His novel The Man They Hanged was about Captain Kidd, and argued that Kidd was not a pirate but had been made a scapegoat by the British government.

During World War I, Chambers wrote war adventure novels and war stories, some of which showed a strong return to his old weird style, such as "Marooned" in Barbarians (1917). After 1924 he devoted himself solely to writing historical fiction.

Chambers for several years made Broadalbin, New York, his summer home. Some of his novels touch upon colonial life in Broadalbin and Johnstown.

== Personal life ==
On July 12, 1898, he married Elsa (Elsie) Vaughn Moller (1882–1939). They had a son, Robert Edward Stuart Chambers (1899–1955) (who sometimes used the name Robert Husted Chambers).

== Death ==
Robert W. Chambers died on December 16, 1933, three days after undergoing intestinal surgery.

== Criticism and legacy ==
H. P. Lovecraft said of Chambers in a letter to Clark Ashton Smith:

Chambers is like Rupert Hughes and a few other fallen Titans – equipped with the right brains and education but wholly out of the habit of using them.

Though Chambers largely abandoned supernatural themes in his later works, only his early weird fiction remained in print through most of the twentieth century thanks in part to Lovecraft's inclusion of them in the critical study "Supernatural Horror in Literature".

Frederic Taber Cooper commented:

So much of Mr Chambers's work exasperates, because we feel that he might so easily have made it better."

In an overview of Chambers' historical fiction, Wendy Bousfield stated that the historical novel Cardigan was "Chambers' most highly praised historical novel" during his lifetime. Bousfield also argued that much of Chambers' historical fiction was marred by poorly written characters and "insensitive humor at the expense of ethnic types". Bousfield also wrote that "Chambers' trivializing of human relationships is regrettable, since his recreation of period details of dress and daily life is vivid and historically accurate."

Critical studies of Chambers's horror and fantasy work include Lee Weinstein's essay in Supernatural Fiction Writers, Brian Stableford's essay in the St. James Guide to Horror, Ghost and Gothic Writers and a chapter in S. T. Joshi's book The Evolution of the Weird Tale (2004).

Chambers's novel The Tracer of Lost Persons was adapted into a long-running (1937–54) radio crime drama, Mr. Keen, Tracer of Lost Persons, by soap opera producers Frank and Anne Hummert.

Science fiction and fantasy writers influenced by Robert W. Chambers' work include H. P. Lovecraft, A. Merritt, Robert E. Howard, Clark Ashton Smith, Tod Robbins, Jack Vance, James Blish, Marion Zimmer Bradley, Joseph Payne Brennan, Lin Carter, and Karl Edward Wagner.

Chambers's The King in Yellow has inspired many modern authors, including Joseph S. Pulver, Lin Carter, James Blish, Nic Pizzolatto, Michael Cisco, Stephen King, Ann K. Schwader, Robert M. Price, Galad Elflandsson and Charles Stross.

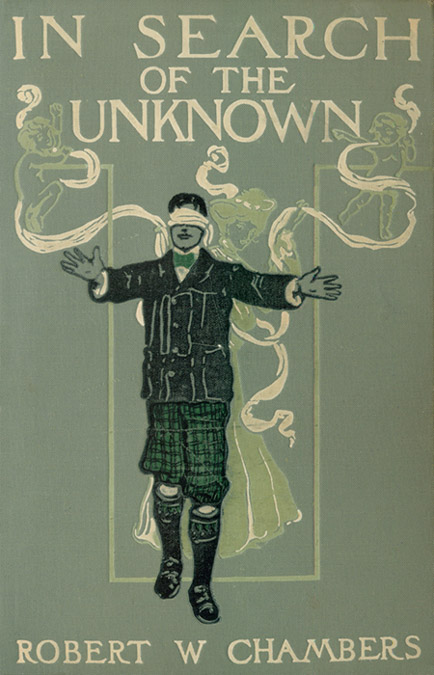
Cover of the first edition of In Search of the Unknown

== Bibliography ==
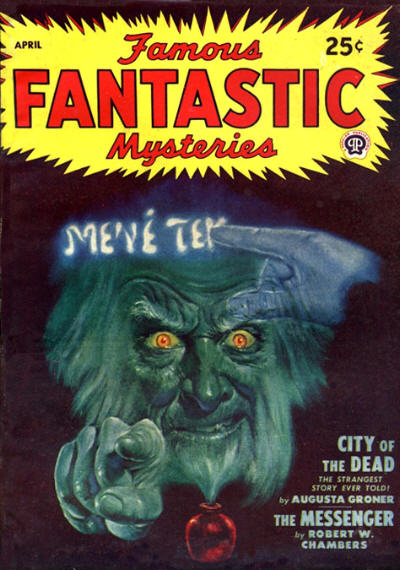
A reprint of Chambers's 1897 novelette "The Messenger" was cover-featured on the April 1948 issue of Famous Fantastic Mysteries.

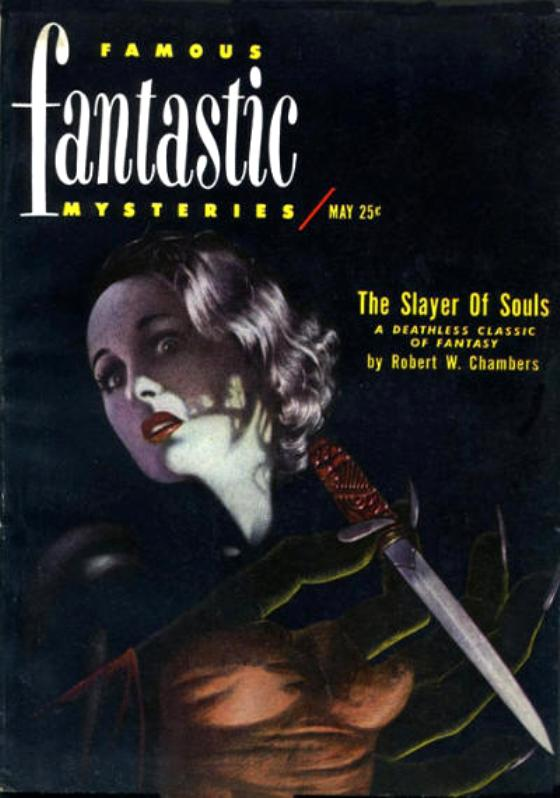
Chambers's 1920 novel The Slayer of Souls was reprinted as the cover story on the May 1951 issue of Famous Fantastic Mysteries.

=== Novels and story collections ===
- In the Quarter (1894)
- The King in Yellow (1895) – short stories
- The Red Republic (1895)
- The Maker of Moons (1896) – short stories
- A King and A Few Dukes (1896)
- With the Band (1896)
- The Mystery of Choice (1897) – short stories
- Lorraine (1898)
- Ashes of Empire (1898)
- The Haunts of Men (1898) – short stories
- Outsiders (1899)
- The Cambric Mask (1899)
- The Conspirators (1899)
- Cardigan (1901)
- The Maid-at-Arms (1902)
- The Maids of Paradise (1903)
- In Search of the Unknown (1904)
- A Young Man in a Hurry (1904) – short stories
- The Reckoning (1905)
- Iole (1905)
- The Tracer of Lost Persons (1906)
- The Fighting Chance (1906)
- The Tree of Heaven (1907) – short stories
- The Younger Set (1907)
- Some Ladies in Haste (1908)
- The Firing Line (1908)
- Romance (1908) – serialized in Collier's
- Special Messenger (1909)
- The Danger Mark (1909)
- The Green Mouse (1910)
- Ailsa Paige (1910)
- The Common Law (1911)
- The Adventures of a Modest Man (1911)
- Blue-Bird Weather (1912)
- The Streets of Ascalon (1912)
- The Japonette (1912) – serialized in Cosmopolitan under the title The Turning Point
- The Gay Rebellion (1913)
- The Business of Life (1913)
- Quick Action (1914)
- The Hidden Children (1914)
- Anne's Bridge (1914)
- Between Friends (1914)
- Who Goes There! (1915)
- Athalie (1915)
- Police!!! (1915) – short stories
- The Girl Philippa (1916)
- The Better Man (1916) – short stories
- The Dark Star (1917)
- Barbarians (1917)
- The Laughing Girl (1918)
- The Restless Sex (1918)
- The Moonlit Way (1919)
- In Secret (1919)
- The Crimson Tide (1919)
- A Story of Primitive Love (1920)
- The Slayer of Souls (1920)
- The Little Red Foot (1920)
- Eris (1922)
- The Flaming Jewel (1922)
- The Talkers (1923)
- The Hi-Jackers (1923)
- America; or, The Sacrifice (1924)
- The Mystery Lady (1925)
- Marie Halkett (1925 UK, 1937 US)
- The Girl in Golden Rags (1925 UK, 1936 US)
- The Man They Hanged (1926)
- The Drums of Aulone (1927)
- The Gold Chase (1927)
- The Sun Hawk (1928)
- The Rogue's Moon (1928)
- The Happy Parrot (1929)
- The Painted Minx (1930)
- The Rake and the Hussy (1930)
- War Paint and Rouge (1931)
- Gitana (1931)
- Whistling Cat (1932)
- Whatever Love Is (1933)
- Secret Service Operator 13 (1934) – short stories published in Cosmopolitan between 1930 and 1932
- The Young Man's Girl (1934) – serialized in The Delineator, 1933
- Love and the Lieutenant (1935) – serialized in The Woman's Home Companion, 1934
- Beating Wings (1936) – serialized in McCall's, 1927
- The Fifth Horseman (1937) – serialized in McCall's, 1930
- Smoke of Battle (1938) – this novel was possibly finished by Rupert Hughes.

=== Children's books ===
- Outdoorland (1902). Illustrated by Reginald Bathurst Birch
- Orchard-Land (1903). Illustrated by Reginald Bathurst Birch
- River-Land (1904). Illustrated by Elizabeth S. Green
- Forest-Land (1905). Illustrated by Emily Benson Knipe
- Mountain-Land (1906). Illustrated by Frederick Richardson & Walter King Stone
- Garden-Land (1907). Illustrated by Harrison Cady
- The Happy Parrot (1931). Illustrated by Norman Price

=== Reprint collections ===
- The King in Yellow and Other Horror Stories, edited by E. F. Bleiler, Dover 1970
- The Yellow Sign and Other Stories, edited by S.T. Joshi, Chaosium 2004

=== Anthologies containing reprinted work by Robert W. Chambers ===
- Sporting Blood: The Great Sports Detective Stories, edited by Ellery Queen, Little, Brown and Company, 1942 – contains "The Purple Emperor"
- Sleep No More, edited by August Derleth, Rinehart & Company, 1944 – contains "The Yellow Sign"
- The Faded Banners, edited by Eric Solomon, T. Yoseloff, 1960 – contains "Pickets"
- The Dark Descent, edited by David G. Hartwell, Tor, 1987 – contains "The Repairer of Reputations"
- The Horror Hall of Fame, edited by Robert Silverberg and Martin H. Greenberg, Carroll & Graf, 1991 – contains "The Yellow Sign"
- The Hastur Cycle, edited by Robert M. Price, Chaosium, 1993 – contains "The Repairer of Reputations" and "The Yellow Sign"
- Detection by Gaslight, edited by Douglas G. Greene, Dover Publications, 1997 – contains "The Purple Emperor"
- The Innsmouth Cycle, edited by Robert M. Price, Chaosium, 1998 – contains "The Harbor-Master" (the first five chapters of In Search of the Unknown)
- American Supernatural Tales, edited by S. T. Joshi, Penguin Classics, 2007 – contains "The Yellow Sign"
- The Tindalos Cycle, edited by Robert M. Price, Hippocampus Press, 2010 – contains "The Maker of Moons"

== Movies ==
- The Reckoning (1908), silent short film adaptation of novel. Directed by D. W. Griffith
- The Common Law (1916), silent film adaptation of novel. Directed by Albert Capellani
- The Fighting Chance (1916), silent film adaptation of novel.
- The Girl Philippa (1917), silent film adaptation of novel. Directed by S. Rankin Drew
- The Hidden Children (1917), silent film adaptation of novel. Directed by Oscar Apfel
- The Fettered Woman (1917), silent film adaptation of Anne's Bridge. Directed by Tom Terriss
- Who Goes There? (1917), silent film adaptation of novel. Directed by William P. S. Earle
- The Woman Between Friends (1918), silent film adaptation of Between Friends. Directed by Tom Terriss
- The Business of Life (1918), silent film adaptation of novel. Directed by Tom Terriss
- The Danger Mark (1918), silent film adaptation of novel. Directed by Hugh Ford
- The Girl of Today (1918), silent film adaptation of short story. Directed by John S. Robertson
- The Cambric Mask (1919), silent film adaptation of novel. Directed by Tom Terriss
- The Firing Line (1919), silent film adaptation of novel. Directed by Charles Maigne
- The Dark Star (1919), silent film adaptation of novel. Directed by Allan Dwan
- The Black Secret (1919), silent film serial adaptation of In Secret. Directed by George B. Seitz
- Even as Eve (1920), silent film adaptation of short story "The Shining Band". Directed by Chester De Vonde and B. A. Rolfe
- The Turning Point (1920), silent film adaptation of The Japonette. Directed by J. A. Barry
- The Fighting Chance (1920), silent film adaptation of novel. Directed by Charles Maigne
- The Restless Sex (1920), silent film adaptation of novel. Directed by Leon D'Usseau and Robert Z. Leonard
- Unseen Forces (1920), silent film adaptation of Athalie. Directed by Sidney A. Franklin
- Cardigan (1922), silent film adaptation of novel. Screenplay by Chambers. Directed by John W. Noble
- The Common Law (1923), silent film adaptation of novel. Directed by George Archainbaud
- America (1924), silent film adaptation of The Reckoning. Screenplay by Chambers. Directed by D. W. Griffith
- Between Friends (1924), silent film adaptation of novel. Directed by J. Stuart Blackton
- The Common Law (1931), film adaptation of novel. Directed by Paul L. Stein
- Operator 13 (1934), film adaptation of short stories from Secret Service Operator 13. Directed by Richard Boleslawski
- A Time Out of War (1954), short film adaptation of short story "Pickets". Directed by Denis Sanders
- The Yellow Sign (2001), film adaptation of short story. Directed by Aaron Vanek
