= The Maker of Moons =

1896 short story collection

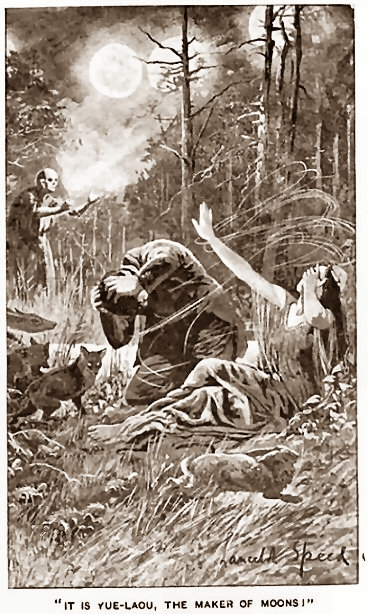
- "It is Yue-Laou, the Maker of Moons"
- Author: Robert W. Chambers
- Language: English
- Publication date: 1896
- Publication place: United States

The Maker of Moons is an 1896 short story collection by Robert W. Chambers which followed the publication of Chambers' most famous work, The King in Yellow (1895).

It contained eight new stories, including the title story, one of his weird tales, and several romantic Art Nouveau stories, concluding with two more weird tales. These two tales were subsequently incorporated into the episodic novel In Search of the Unknown.

The first three stories are linked by the theme of a dream wife named Ysonde. The weird nature of the first story has echoes in the other two, which feature picturesque animal figures, such as a red ibis and a disagreeable porcupine.

The story "In the Name of the Most High" is set during the American Civil War. The next two stories are humorous romantic tales with a fishing theme and setting. Chambers' love of natural scenery illuminates most of the stories.

The short story was published by Putnam's, in New York and London, in 1896.

The first edition featured a frontispiece with a black and white illustration by Lancelot Speed.

== Contents ==
- "The Maker of Moons"
- "The Silent Land"
- "The Black Water"
- "In the Name of the Most High"
- "Boy's Sister"
- "The Crime"
- "A Pleasant Evening"
- "The Man At The Next Table"

== Reviews ==
The book was received favorably abroad.
