= Cinema of South Africa =

- No. of screens: 857 (2010)
  - Per capita: 1.9 per 100,000 (2010)
- Main distributors: Ster-Kinekor 38.8% Nu-Metro 35.7% Uip 21.7%

Produced feature films (2016)
- Total: 28

Number of admissions (2011)
- Total: 22,400,000

Gross box office (2016)
- Total: R1.14 billion
- National films: R69 million (6%)

The cinema of South Africa refers to the films and film industry of South Africa. Films have been made in English and Afrikaans (List of Afrikaans-language films). Many foreign films have been produced about South Africa, including many involving race relations.

The first South African film to achieve international acclaim and recognition was the 1980 comedy The Gods Must Be Crazy, written, produced and directed by Jamie Uys. Set in the Kalahari, it tells the story of how life in the community of Bushmen changes when a Coke bottle, thrown out of an airplane, suddenly lands from the sky. Even though the film presented an incorrect perspective of the Khoisan san people, by framing them as a primitive society enlightened by the modernity of a falling Coke bottle. The late Jamie Uys, who wrote and directed The Gods Must Be Crazy, also had success overseas in the 1970s with his films Funny People and Funny People II, similar to the TV series Candid Camera in the United States. Leon Schuster's You Must Be Joking! films are in the same genre, and were popular among the white population of South Africa during apartheid.

Another high-profile film portraying South Africa was District 9 (2009). Directed by Neill Blomkamp, a native South African, and produced by The Lord of the Rings trilogy director Peter Jackson, the action/science-fiction film depicts a sub-class of alien refugees forced to live in the slums of Johannesburg in what many saw as a creative allegory for apartheid. The film was a critical and commercial success worldwide, and was nominated for four Academy Awards, including Best Picture, at the 82nd Academy Awards.

== Silent Era ==
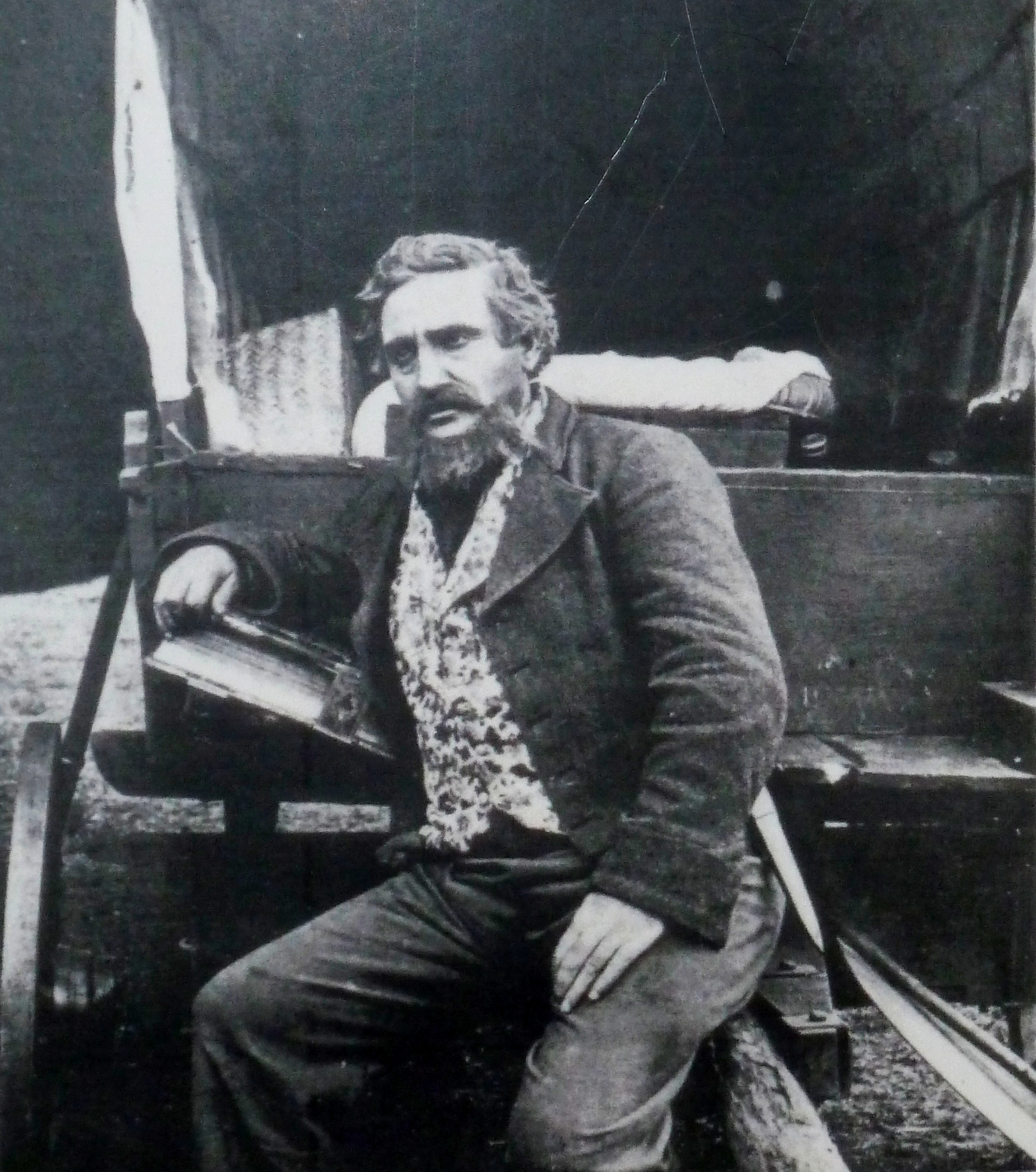
Dick Cruikshanks as Piet Retief in the 1916 silent film, "The Voortrekkers" (or "Winning a Continent" in the USA).

The first film studio in South Africa, Killarney Film Studios, was established in 1915 in Johannesburg by American business tycoon Isidore W. Schlesinger when he traveled to South Africa against his family's wishes after he read about the discovery of gold in Witwatersrand and was interested in exploring what he could find.

During the 1910s and 1920s, a significant amount of South African films were made in or around Durban. These films often used the dramatic scenery of rural KwaZulu-Natal, particularly the Drakensberg region. KwaZulu-Natal also served as the location for historical films such as De Voortrekkers (1916) and The Symbol of Sacrifice (1918). American filmmaker Lorimer Johnston directed several films in the area in the late 1910s, which starred American actresses Edna Flugrath and Caroline Frances Cooke. Despite Johnson, Flugrath, and Cooke's participation, these were South African productions featuring local actors and stories.

A notable theme in early South African cinema was the ethic confrontation between Boer and British South Africans stemming from the Second Boer War.

== Sound Era ==
Sarie Marais, directed by Joseph Albrecht, the first South African sound film and Afrikaans-language sound film, was released in 1931. Subsequent sound releases such as Die Wildsboudjie (1948), a 1949 Sarie Marais remake, and Daar doer in die bosveld (1950) continued to cater primarily to white, Afrikaans-speaking audiences.

African Film Productions produced four musical films from 1949-1951: African Jim, The Magic Garden, Song of Africa and Zonk!

The 1950s saw an increased use of South African locations and talent by international filmmakers. British co-productions such as Coast of Skeletons (1956) and American co-productions such as The Cape Town Affair (1967) reflected a growing trend toward shooting on location rather than on backlots.

== International Productions ==
Since 2009, there has been an increase in the use of South African locations and talent by international film studios. US productions like District 9 (2009), Chronicle (2012), Avengers: Age of Ultron (2015), The Dark Tower (2017), Tomb Raider (2018), The Kissing Booth (2018), Maze Runner: The Death Cure (2018), Escape Room (2019) and Bloodshot (2020) reflect a growing trend by large international houses to use Cape Town, Johannesburg and other South African locations for their film productions.

== Historiography ==
Jacqueline Maingard, at the University of Bristol, has written on the history of film in South Africa.

== Film distributors ==
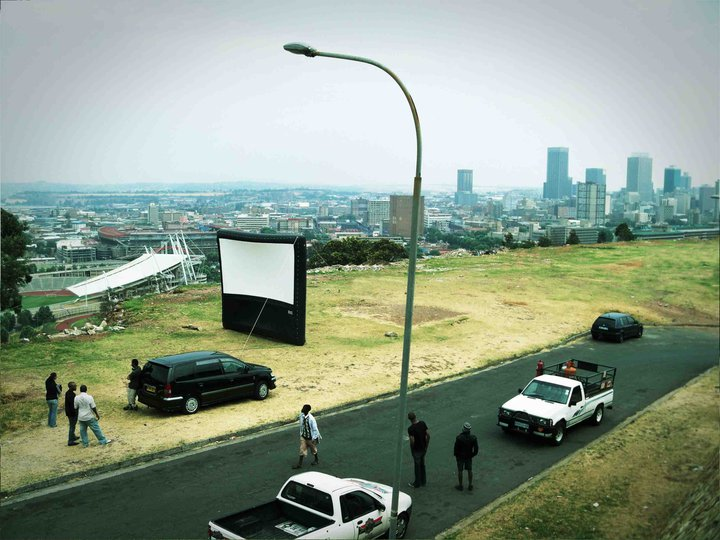
Open-Air-Cinema in Johannesburg.

Listed alongside each distributor are the studios they represent:

- Nu Metro (pre-2013)/Times Media Films: 20th Century Studios, Warner Bros., New Line Cinema, DreamWorks Pictures, DreamWorks Animation, SVF Entertainment, Eskay Movies, Surinder Films, Windows Productions, Raj Chakraborty Entertainment.
- Ster-Kinekor: Walt Disney Pictures, Sony Pictures, and formerly PolyGram Filmed Entertainment and 20th Century Fox.
- United International Pictures: Universal Pictures, Paramount Pictures, VideoVision Entertainment

== Notable South African Filmmakers ==
Here are several notable South African filmmakers who have added to South Africa's cinema history:

- Joseph Albrecht (1894–1977): A South African director, writer, producer, and actor, he is often referred to as "the father of South African film." He directed and co-directed several feature films and shorts such as The Piccanin's Christmas (1917), Isban; or, The Mystery of the Great Zimbabwe (1920) and South Africa's first sound film Sarie Marais (1931).
- Jamie Uys (1921-1996): An award winning South Africa director, producer, writer and actor who films include Beautiful People (1999) and the 1981 Grand Prix winner from Festival International du Film de Comedy VeveyThe Gods Must be Crazy (1980).
- Zola Maseko (born 1967): Swazi-born film director who's best known for his films The Foreigner (1994) addressing South African xenophobia and The Life and Times of Sarah Baartman (1998) portraying the life of a Koi woman kidnapped and displayed in 19th century Europe as "the Hottentot Venus". In 2004, Maseko produced his first feature entitled Drum telling the story of an anti-apartheid journalist in 1950s Johannesburg. This film was the first South African film to receive the Golden Stallion of Yennenga at FESPACO in 2005.
- Gavin Hood (born 1963): a director and filmmaker most famous for his Oscar award-winning film Tsotsi (2005) based on the novel of the same name by Athol Fugard. He has earned international acclaim, directing films such as the Polish film In Desert and Wilderness and Marvel's X-Men Origins: Wolverine.
- Dean Israelite (born 1984): South African film director, writer, and producer. He is best known for directing the science-fiction thriller Project Almanac (2015), and for bringing a mature, real-world approach to Haim Saban's Power Rangers (2017).

== See also ==
- List of South African films
- Media of South Africa
- Cinema of the world
- World cinema
- African cinema
- South African Film and Television Awards
