= Jennie Ahlstrom =

American silent film actress

- Born: Jennie Cecilia Ahlstrom; June 12, 1861; New York City, New York, U.S.
- Died: October 21, 1938 (aged 77); Los Angeles, California, U.S.
- Years active: 1911–1916
- Spouse: William Bechtel

Jennie Cecilia Ahlstrom (June 12, 1861 – October 21, 1938), professionally known as Mrs. William Bechtel, was an American actress active during the silent film era. She was married to German-American actor William Bechtel. From 1911 to 1916, she appeared in nearly 100 short films. The couple had no children.

== Selected filmography ==
- The Quest of Life (1916)
- The Purple Lady (1916)
- The Diamond Crown (1913)
- The Evil Thereof (1913)
- A Christmas Accident (1912)
- The Librarian (1912, Short) as Miss Curtis
- The Land Beyond the Sunset (1912)
- Kitty at Boarding School (1912)
- A Fresh Air Romance (1912)
- Hearts and Diamonds (1912)
