= Beauty and the Barge =

Beauty and the Barge may refer to:

- Beauty and the Barge (play), a 1905 play by W. W. Jacobs
- Beauty and the Barge (1914 film), a silent British film directed by Harold M. Shaw
- Beauty and the Barge (1937 film), a sound British film directed by Henry Edwards
