= Rodney Stone =

1896 novel by Arthur Conan Doyle

- First US edition (publ. D. Appleton and Company)
- Author: Arthur Conan Doyle
- Language: English
- Publication date: 1896

Rodney Stone is a Gothic mystery and boxing novel by Scottish writer Sir Arthur Conan Doyle first published in 1896.

The eponymous narrator is a Sussex country boy who is the son of a sailor and wishes to go to sea himself. He is taken to London by his uncle Sir Charles Tregellis, a highly respected gentleman and arbiter of fashion who is on familiar terms with the most important people of Great Britain. The novel interweaves Rodney's coming-of-age story with that of his friend Boy Jim's boxing endeavours. Jim has been brought up by a blacksmith whom he believes to be his uncle - the blacksmith Harrison was a famous former boxer and the 'nephew' wishes to fight too. A large portion of it deals with the famous bare-knuckle boxers of the late eighteenth and early nineteenth centuries, such as Jem Belcher, John Jackson, Daniel Mendoza, Dutch Sam, and others. The book includes vignettes of a number of historical personages, notably the Prince Regent, Lord Nelson, Sir John Lade, Lord Cochrane and Beau Brummell. There are also descriptions of thuggery, of gambling and cheating, and of dangerous horse-drawn chases.

It was adapted into a 1913 silent film, The House of Temperley, directed by Harold M. Shaw.

The novel was dramatised as a four-part serial on BBC Radio 4 in 1983, which was repeated on BBC Radio 4 Extra in March 2020 and June 2022. Available online via BBC Sounds.
