= Anne Merwin =

American screenwriter

- Born: Anne Nelson; April 9, 1887; Brooklyn, New York, USA
- Died: September 12, 1962 (aged 75); Los Angeles, California, USA
- Occupation: Screenwriter
- Spouse: Bannister Merwin

Anne Merwin (born Anne Nelson; April 9, 1887 – September 12, 1962) was an American screenwriter known for writing short Edison comedies in the silent era. She was married to director Bannister Merwin, who also worked for Edison. Later, both Anne and Bannister Merwin wrote scenarios for the London Film Company.

The Bioscope wrote that "The names of Anne and Bannister Merwin as authors of a drama for the screen are a guarantee of originality and felicity of invention, combined with a picturesque treatment which never fails to render their productions of unusual interest". The same magazine comments on Merwin's writing when discussing The Ring and the Rajah: "Miss Anne Merwin has written a very effective drama, ... The story is interesting, and is set forth in a concise and dramatic manner..."

== Filmography ==
- The Foreman's Treachery (1913)
- The Elder Brother (1913)
- A Youthful Knight (1913)
- The Revenge of Mr. Thomas Atkins (1914)
- The Fringe of War (1914)
- The Victoria Cross or V.C. (1914)
- The Ring and the Rajah (1914)
- All for His Sake (1914)
- A Daughter of Romany (1914)
- A Warning (1914)
- Stormflower (1921)
