= The Heart of a Child =

1915 film by Harold M. Shaw

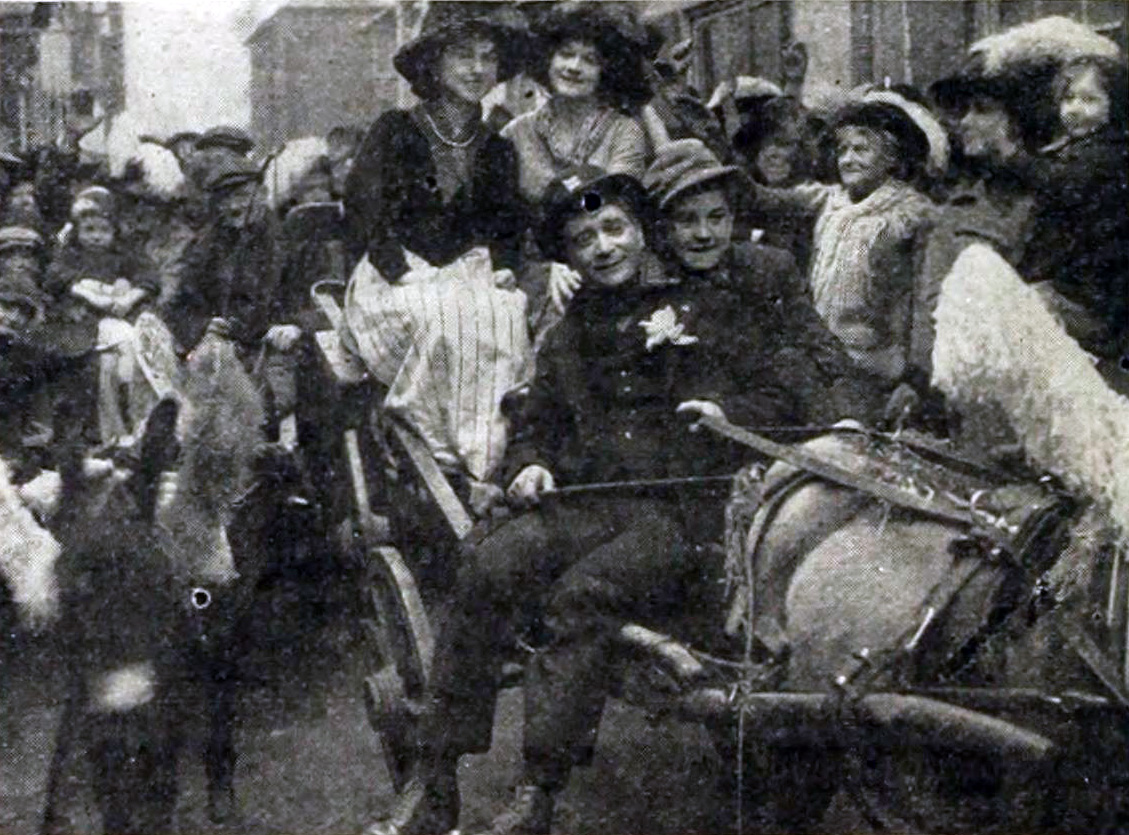
- Still from a review in The Moving Picture World
- Directed by: Harold M. Shaw
- Release date: 1915
- Country: United Kingdom
- Language: Silent

The Heart of a Child is a 1915 British silent drama film directed by Harold M. Shaw and starring Edna Flugrath, Edward Sass and Hayford Hobbs. It is based on a 1908 novel by Frank Danby.

A later remake of Danby's story appeared in 1920 starring Alla Nazimova.

== Plot ==
A girl from the slums is injured by an aristocrat's car. Years later, now a successful dancer, she falls in love with the aristocrat's brother.

== Cast ==
- Edna Flugrath - Sally Snape
- Edward Sass - Lord Kidderminster
- Hayford Hobbs - Lord Gilbert
- Mary Dibley - Lady Dorothea Lytham
- George Bellamy - Mr. Peastone
- Douglas Munro - Joe Aarons
- Frank Stanmore - Johnny Doone
- Gwynne Herbert - Lady Fortive
- Christine Rayner ... Mary
- Lewis Gilbert - Bill Snape
- Anna Godfrey - Mrs. Snape
- Stanley Burton - Johnny's Brother
