= Bannister Merwin =

American film director, poet, novelist and screen writer

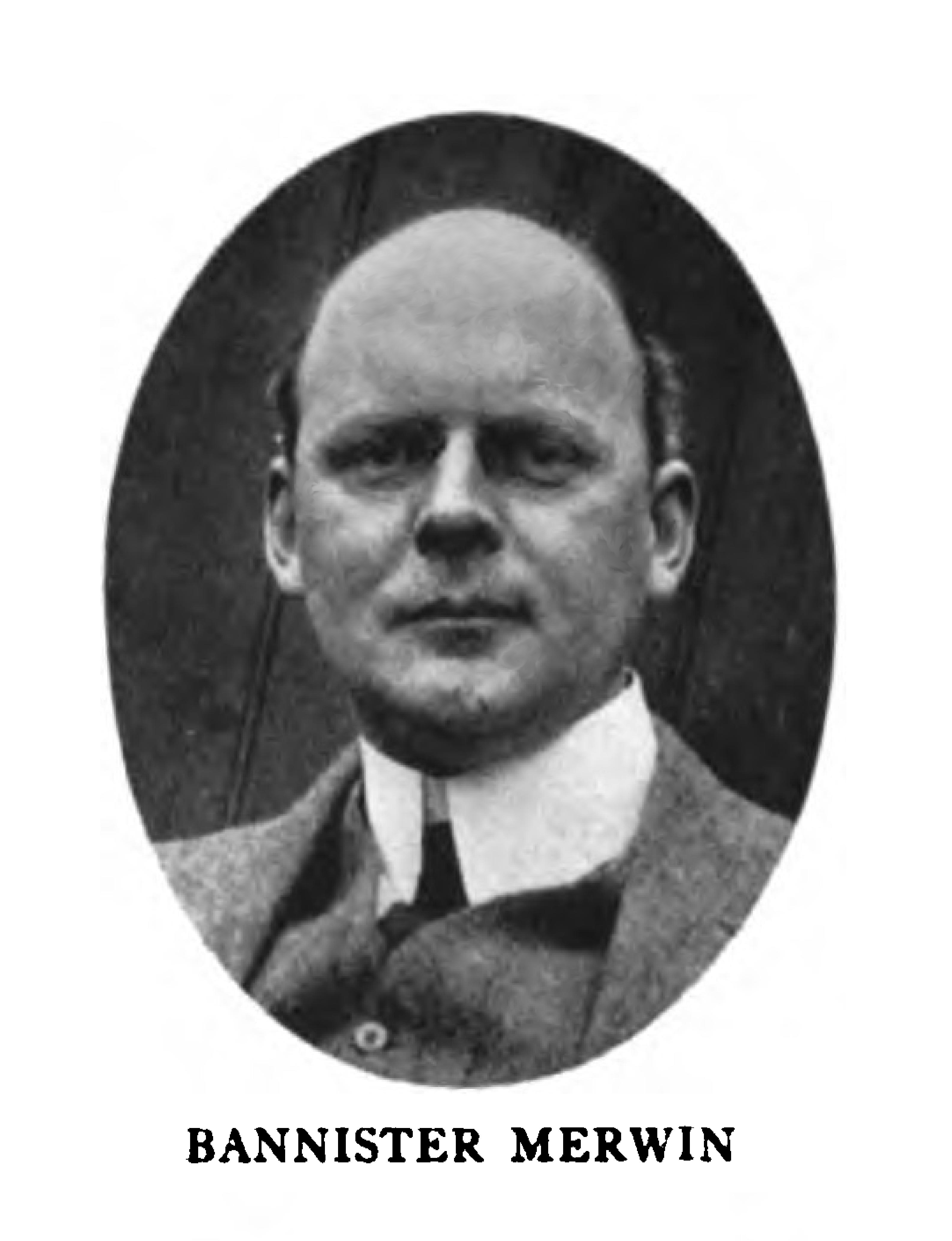

Henry Bannister Merwin (1873 – 22 February 1922), was an American poet, magazine editor, novelist, film director and screenwriter during the silent era. He wrote as many as 141 films between 1909 and 1921. He was associated with Edison Studios and the London Film Company. Merwin often wrote with his wife, Anne Merwin.

He was born in Litchfield, Connecticut, United States and died in London, England, United Kingdom.

== Selected filmography ==
=== Screenwriter ===
- For the Cause of the South (1912)
- In His Father's Steps (1912)
- Holding the Fort (1912)
- Helping John (1912)
- The Sunset Gun (1912)
- Liberty Hall (1914)
- The Black Spot (1914)
- She Stoops to Conquer (1914)
- A Turf Conspiracy (1918)
- The Silver Greyhound (1919)
- The Land of Mystery (1920)
- London Pride (1920)
- The Pursuit of Pamela (1920)
- True Tilda (1920)
- The Golden Dawn (1921)
- The Magistrate (1921)

=== Director ===
- Her Heritage (1919)
- The Librarian (1912, Short)
