= The Wheels of Chance =

Novel by H. G. Wells

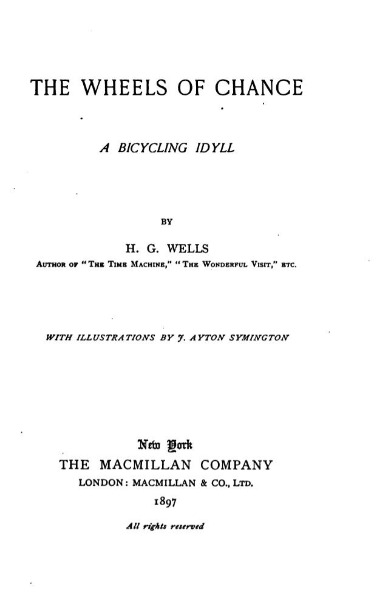
- Title page for The Wheels of Chance (1897)
- Author: H. G. Wells
- Illustrator: J. Ayton Symington
- Language: English
- Genre: Comedy
- Publisher: J. M. Dent
- Publication date: 1896
- Publication place: United Kingdom
- Media type: Print (Hardbound)
- Pages: 313 pp
- Text: The Wheels of Chance at Wikisource

The Wheels of Chance is an early comic novel by H. G. Wells about an August 1895 cycling holiday, somewhat in the style of Three Men in a Boat. In 1922 it was adapted into a silent film The Wheels of Chance directed by Harold M. Shaw.

== Plot introduction ==
The Wheels of Chance was written at the height of the cycling craze (1890–1905), when practical, comfortable bicycles first became widely and cheaply available and before the rise of the automobile.

== Plot ==
The hero of The Wheels of Chance, Mr. Hoopdriver, is a frustrated "draper's assistant" in Putney, a badly paid, grinding position (and one which Wells briefly held); and yet he owns a bicycle and is setting out on a bicycling tour of "the Southern Coast" on his annual ten days' holiday.

Hoopdriver survives his frustration by escaping in his imagination into a world of fantasy. He is not a skilled rider of his forty-three-pound bicycle, and his awkwardness reflects both Wells's own uncertainties in negotiating the English class system and his critical view of that society. Nonetheless, Hoopdriver is treated sympathetically: "But if you see how a mere counter-jumper, a cad on castors, and a fool to boot, may come to feel the little insufficiencies of life, and if he has to any extent won your sympathies, my end is attained."

Hoopdriver's summer adventure begins lyrically:

Only those who toil six long days out of the seven, and all the year round, save for one brief glorious fortnight or ten days in the summer time, know the exquisite sensations of the First Holiday Morning. All the dreary, uninteresting routine drops from you suddenly, your chains fall about your feet. . . . There were thrushes in the Richmond Road, and a lark on Putney Heath. The freshness of dew was in the air; dew or the relics of an overnight shower glittered on the leaves and grass. . . . He wheeled his machine up Putney Hill, and his heart sang within him.

Hoopdriver encounters a pretty young woman cycling alone and wearing rationals (bloomers). He dares not speak to the Young Lady in Grey, as he calls her, but their paths keep crossing. She is ultimately revealed to be Jessie Milton, a girl of seventeen who has run away from her stepmother in Surbiton, risking "ruin" at the hands of the bounder Bechamel, an unscrupulous older man who has promised to help the naive Jessie to establish herself an independent life but who is really intent on seducing her. Ironically, her flight has in part been inspired by liberal ideals of unconventionality that have been hypocritically promoted by her stepmother's popular novels.

Hoopdriver half-inadvertently rescues her from Bechamel's clutches, and the two proceed to cycle across the south of England. Ashamed of his true circumstances, Hoopdriver spins droll tales of South African origins and the comforts of wealth until shame induces him to confess his true circumstances. But he also displays genuine courage, rebuking insolent travellers who insult Jessie's honour.

Hoopdriver's encounter inspires in him a desire to better himself, as well as impossibly romantic feelings toward Jessie. At last a party consisting of her stepmother, some of her stepmother's admirers, and her former schoolteacher catches up with them. Jessie returns home and Hoopdriver returns to the Drapery Emporium of Messrs. Antrobus & Co., but Jessie has promised to "send him some books" and has held out the vague prospect that "in six years' time" things may be different.

Jessie's bookish and romantic education has kept her ignorant of the realities of life, and her ignorance contributes to the comedy of Hoopdriver's half-clever, half-ridiculous improvised stories of life in Africa. Jessie has her own aspirations: "She was going to Live her Own Life, with emphasis." Wells's intention in The Wheels of Chance might be taken to be satirical, were his protagonists' circumstances not so closely related to his own history and that of his second wife, Catherine Robbins.

== Setting ==
Wells used real places in plotting the novel, and the entire route can be followed on a map. Among the sites described in the novel are Ripley, Cobham, Guildford, Haslemere, Godalming, Milford, Midhurst, Chichester, Bognor (where, at the Vicuna Hotel, Hoopdriver comes to Jessie's rescue), Chichester Harbour, Havant, Botley, the hamlet of Wallenstock (where Hoopdriver defends Jessie's honour), Blandford (where Hoopdriver confesses his true identity to Jessie), Ringwood, Stoney Cross, and the Rufus Stone (where Hoopdriver says good-bye to Jessie).

== Publication ==
The novel was paired with The Time Machine and included in the Everyman's Library (no. 915) in 1935.
