= A Dear Fool =

1921 British film by Harold M. Shaw

- Directed by: Harold M. Shaw
- Written by: Arthur T. Mason; Frank Miller
- Starring: George K. Arthur; Edna Flugrath; Edward O'Neill; Bertie Wright
- Release date: 1921
- Country: United Kingdom

A Dear Fool is a 1921 British silent comedy film directed by Harold M. Shaw and starring George K. Arthur, Edna Flugrath and Edward O'Neill. It was based on a novel by Arthur T. Mason. An ambitious young Fleet Street reporter is sent to discover the identity of a reclusive new playwright.

== Cast ==
- George K. Arthur - John Denison
- Edna Flugrath - Viva Hamilton
- Edward O'Neill - Stephen Blair
- Bertie Wright - Sir John Boscatel
- Vera Tyndale - Lady Boscatel
- C. Tilson-Chowne - Oliver Chambers
- Mabel Archdale - Sylvia Polesworthy
