= The Evil Thereof =

The Evil Thereof may refer to:

- The Evil Thereof (1913 film)
- The Evil Thereof (1916 film)
