= Zonk =

Zonk may refer to:

- Zonk, nickname for Keith Moreland, former Major League Baseball player
- Zonk, name used for undesirable "booby prizes" on the game show Let's Make a Deal
- Zonk, protagonist of the video game Air Zonk
- Zonk, Iran, village in Iran
- Zonk! 1950 musical film from South Africa
- Zonk, a dice game similar or synonymous to Farkle
