= Flugrath =

Flugrath is a surname and may refer to:

- Edna Flugrath (1893–1966), American silent film actress
- Leonie Flugrath alias Shirley Mason (1900–1979), American silent film actress
- Virginia Flugrath alias Viola Dana (1897–1987), American silent film actress
