= The Firm of Girdlestone (film) =

1916 silent film

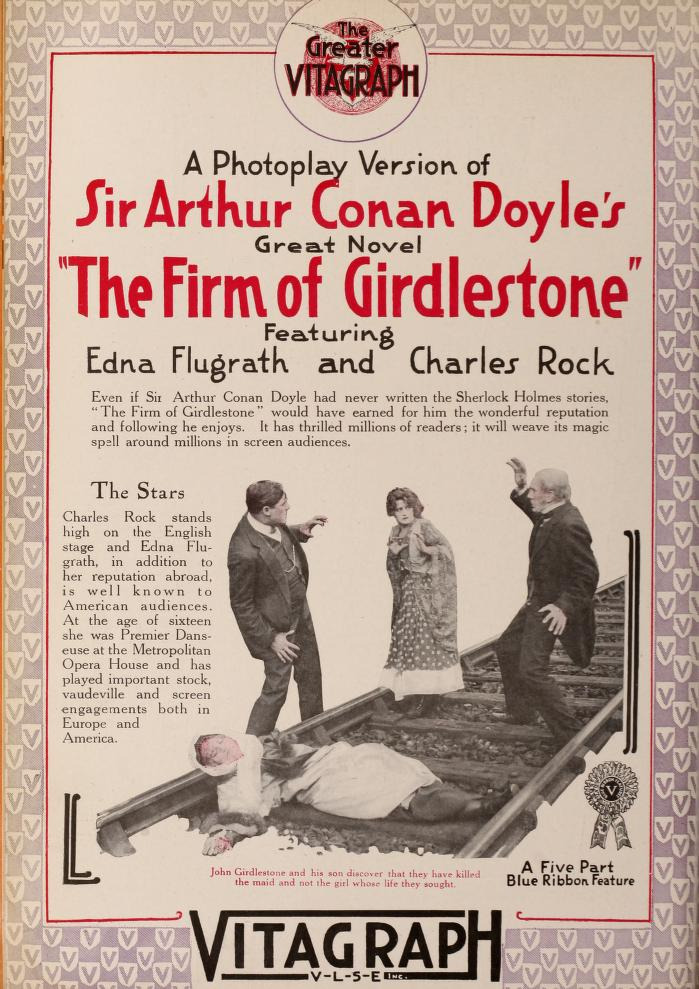
- Directed by: Harold M. Shaw
- Written by: Bannister Merwin
- Based on: The Firm of Girdlestone by Arthur Conan Doyle
- Starring: Edna Flugrath; Fred Groves; Charles Rock
- Production company: London Film Company
- Distributed by: Jury Films; Greater Vitagraph (US)
- Release date: December 1915
- Running time: 50 minutes
- Country: United Kingdom
- Languages: Silent; English intertitles

The Firm of Girdlestone is a 1915 British silent drama film directed by Harold M. Shaw and starring Edna Flugrath, Fred Groves and Charles Rock. It is an adaptation of the 1890 novel The Firm of Girdlestone by Arthur Conan Doyle. It was shot at Twickenham Studios.

== Cast ==
- Edna Flugrath as Kate Horston
- Fred Groves as Ezra Girdlestone
- Charles Rock as John Girdlestone
- Wyndham Guise as Major Clutterbuck
- Hayford Hobbs as Tom Dimsdale
- Gwynne Herbert as Mrs. Scully
- Mollie Terraine as Rebecca

== Bibliography ==
- Nollen, Scott Allen. Sir Arthur Conan Doyle at the Cinema. McFarland & Co., 1996.
