= A Fool's Awakening =

1924 film directed by Harold M. Shaw

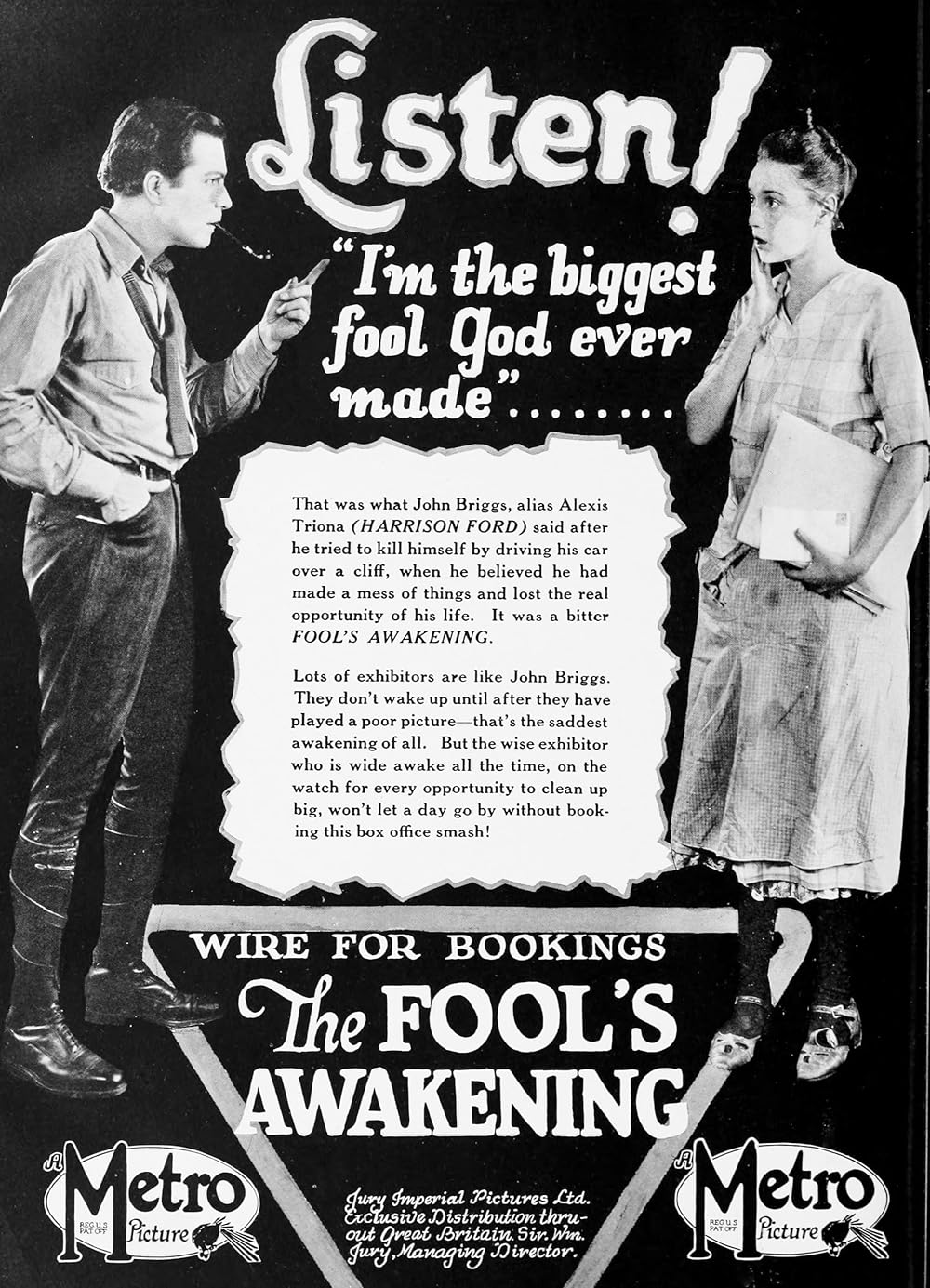
- Directed by: Harold M. Shaw
- Written by: Tom J. Hopkins
- Based on: The Tale of Triona by William J. Locke
- Starring: Mary Alden; Lionel Belmore; Enid Bennett
- Cinematography: Allen G. Siegler
- Production company: Metro Pictures
- Distributed by: Metro Pictures
- Release date: January 28, 1924
- Running time: 60 minutes
- Country: United States
- Language: Silent (English intertitles)

A Fool's Awakening is a 1924 American silent drama film directed by Harold M. Shaw and starring Mary Alden, Lionel Belmore, and Enid Bennett.

== Plot ==
As described in a film magazine review, John Briggs, who was seen service during World War I during the Bolshevik Revolution, returns to England. Discouraged by his failure to be a success in literature, he uses as source material for his stories the tales in a diary he found on a dead Russian soldier. Published using the name Alexis Triona, it becomes a hit. He weds Olivia Gale, and subsequently reveals his deception to her. Repulsed by Olivia after he meets her after driving his automobile, he deliberately swings the vehicle over a cliff. She goes to his aid. He recovers and they are reconciled.

== Cast ==
- Mary Alden as Myra
- Lionel Belmore as Herbert Lorington
- Enid Bennett as Olivia Gale
- Edward Connelly as Blandon
- Mark Fenton as Wainwright
- Harrison Ford as John Briggs
- Alec B. Francis as Maj. Oliphant
- Pauline French as Lady Ordwynne
- D.R.O. Hatswell as Bobby Walton
- Lorimer Johnston as Col. Onslow
- Harry Northrup as Hargrave Mavenna
- Arline Pretty as Lydia Mainwaring
- Evelyn Sherman as Miss Oliphant
- John St. Polis as Lt. Wedderburn

== Bibliography ==
- Munden, Kenneth White. The American Film Institute Catalog of Motion Pictures Produced in the United States, Part 1. University of California Press, 1997.
