= The Wheels of Chance (film) =

1922 film

- Directed by: Harold M. Shaw
- Starring: George K. Arthur; Olwen Roose; Gordon Parker
- Cinematography: A. Randall Terraneau
- Release date: 1922
- Country: United Kingdom

The Wheels of Chance is a 1922 British silent comedy drama film directed by Harold M. Shaw and starring George K. Arthur, Olwen Roose and Gordon Parker. It was based on the 1896 novel The Wheels of Chance by H. G. Wells, and was mostly filmed at the locations in Hampshire and Sussex specified by Wells. The interiors were partly filmed in the hotels named in the novel, with a very few interiors taken at Stoll Pictures' Cricklewood plant. In addition, many of the film's titles are taken directly from Wells' text. This film was the second Wells adaptation Shaw directed with George K. Arthur in the principal role; the first was Kipps (1921).

== Cast ==
- George K. Arthur – Hoopdriver
- Olwen Roose – Jessie Milton
- Gordon Parker – Bechamel
- Bertie Wright – Briggs
- Mabel Archdale – Mrs. Milton
- Judd Green – Wickens
- Wallace Bosco – Dayle
- Clifford Marle – Phipps
