= The Librarian (1912 film) =

- Directed by: Bannister Merwin
- Starring: Mary Fuller; Marc McDermott; Robert Brower; Mrs. William Bechtel; Walter Edwin; William West; George Lessey; Harry Beaumont; James Gordon; William Wadsworth (rumor); Gladys Hulette (rumor)
- Production company: Edison Company
- Distributed by: General Film Company
- Release date: August 9, 1912 (U.S.)
- Running time: 980 feet / 298.7 meters (1 reel)
- Country: United States
- Language: Silent (English intertitles)

The Librarian is a 1912 dramatic silent short film by Bannister Merwin.

Posters were distributed.

== Plot ==
Betty Gibbs is given the position of librarian of the little village library. As soon as she is installed the library becomes very popular. Among those who attend is Robert Prentice, a school teacher, and he and Betty quickly become interested in each other.

Betty’s brother Jack has recently enlisted in the army, and is at a post near the village. Corporal Cutler, coming across Jack Gibbs while the boy is supposedly off duty, is abusive to him, and the boy knocks the officer down.This is a serious offence, and Jack, not know howing badly he has hurt Cutler, deserts, and goes to find Betty.

He comes into the library in the evening, tells Betty what he has done, and begs her to help him escape. She takes him to her room, and leaves him there, only to find that Prentice has come in to talk with her. She goes back to her room, and shuts Jack in the cupboard.

Knowing that Jack is likely to be discovered, Betty decides to save him at the cost of her own good name.Coming back to the reading room, she sees soldiers approaching, the members of the village library committee with them. She tells Prentice to follow her to her room. Shutting him in, she goes to face the search party.

To the Corporal’s questions she gives evasive replies. When he starts his search she resists. At the door of her room she fights against their entering, but the door is opened, and Prentice stands revealed.The library committee stands aghast, and Betty hangs her head in what looks like guilty confusion, while the soldiers, thrown off the scent, retire. Betty dashes into the room, slamming the door after her, and bursts into tears.

Jack hears Betty’s sobs, and comes out. She urges him to go back into hiding, but he will not.Then Prentice, opening the door, sees Jack, and understands. He tells Jack of Betty’s sacrifice.Jack immediately starts to go and give himself up, but Betty clings to him. At this moment the Corporal reappears, followed by the judge and the minister. The Corporal demands Jack’s surrender. He gives himself up, and explains what has happened, thereby clearing Betty’s name. Her sacrifice softens the Corporal’s heart, who forgives Jack, and the picture closes with a shot of Betty and Prentice embracing.

== Production ==
The film was produced by the Edison Company.

== Distribution ==
Distributed by the General Film Company, the film – a one-reel short – was released in US cinemas on August 9, 1912. On December 6 of the same year, it was also released in the United Kingdom. Kinetograph presented the film as ”an unusual story in an unusual atmosphere”.

== Cast ==
- Mary Fuller as Betty Gibbs
- Marc McDermott as ??
- Robert Brower as Judge Binney
- Mrs. William Bechtel as Miss Curtis
- Walter Edwin as Rev. Mr. Wainright
- William West as The Bookworm
- George Lessey as The School Teacher (Robert Prentice)
- Harry Beaumont as Jack Gibbs
- James Gordon as Corporal Cutler
- William Wadsworth as ?? (rumor, not listed in official historical documents)
- Gladys Hulette as ?? (rumor, not listed in official historical documents)
