= The House of Temperley =

1913 film by Harold M. Shaw

- Release date: 1933
- Country: United Kingdom
- Language: Silent

The House of Temperley is a 1913 British silent drama film directed by Harold M. Shaw and starring Charles Maude, Ben Webster and Lillian Logan. It is based on the 1896 novel Rodney Stone by Arthur Conan Doyle and is sometimes known by the alternative title Rodney Stone. The House of Temperley was the first film made by the London Film Company and first shown in Nottingham.

== Cast ==
- Charles Maude - Captain Jack Temperley
- Ben Webster - Sir Charles Temperley
- Lillian Logan - Ethel Morley
- Charles Rock - Sir John Hawker
- Edward O'Neill - Jakes
- Wyndham Guise - Ginger Stubbs
- Cecil Morton York - Gentleman Jackson
- Claire Pauncefort - Lady Temperley
- Rex Davis - Gloster Dick
- John East - Tom Cribb
- Hubert Willis - Shelton
- F. Bennington - Joe Berks
