= Rouged Lips =

1923 silent film

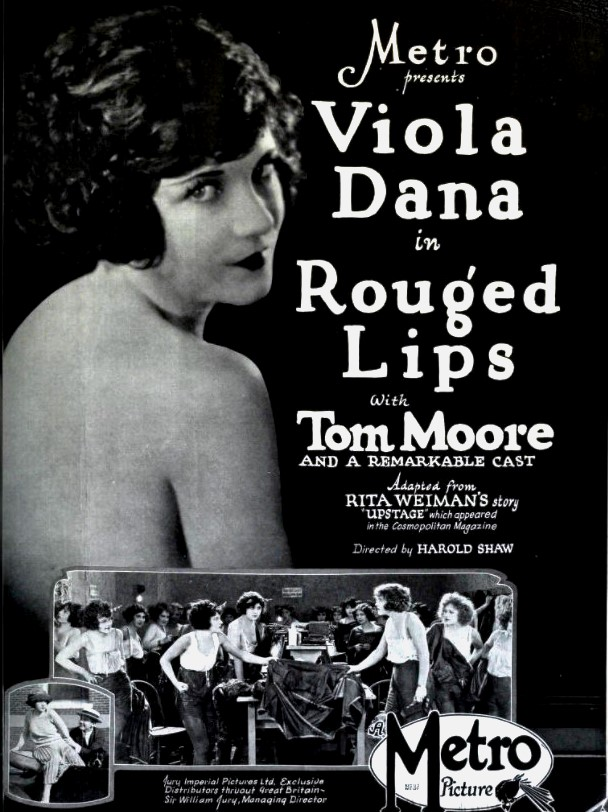
- Advertisement
- Directed by: Harold M. Shaw
- Written by: Clyde Bruckman; Tom J. Hopkins
- Based on: Upstage by Rita Weiman
- Starring: Viola Dana; Tom Moore; Nola Luxford
- Cinematography: John Arnold
- Production company: Metro Pictures
- Distributed by: Metro Pictures
- Release date: September 17, 1923 (United States)
- Running time: 60 minutes
- Country: United States
- Language: Silent (English intertitles)

Rouged Lips is a 1923 American silent drama film directed by Harold M. Shaw and starring Viola Dana, Tom Moore, and Nola Luxford. It is based in the story Upstage by Rita Weiman which appeared in Cosmopolitan Magazine.

== Cast ==
- Viola Dana as Norah MacPherson
- Tom Moore as James Patterson III
- Nola Luxford as Mamie Dugan
- Sidney De Gray as James Patterson II
- Arline Pretty as Mariette
- Francis Powers as Mr. MacPherson
- Georgia Woodthorpe as Mrs. MacPherson
- Burwell Hamrick as Billy Dugan

== Preservation ==
A print of Rouged Lips is reportedly in a foreign film collection.

== Bibliography ==
- Munden, Kenneth White. The American Film Institute Catalog of Motion Pictures Produced in the United States, Part 1. University of California Press, 1997.
