= A Fresh Air Romance =

1912 film directed by Harold M. Shaw

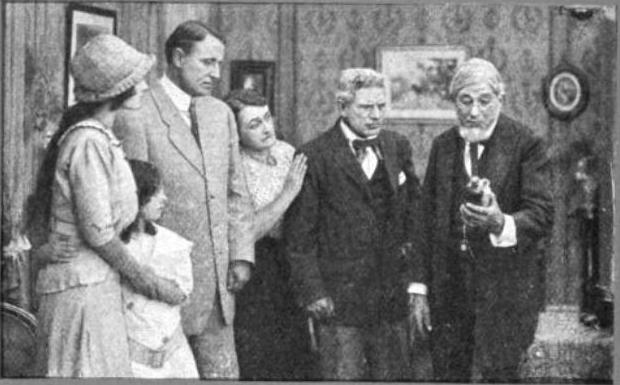
- Directed by: Harold M. Shaw
- Starring: William West; George Lessey; Gertrude McCoy; Mrs. William Bechtel; John Sturgeon; Leonie Flugrath
- Distributed by: Edison
- Release date: October 12, 1912
- Running time: 1000 ft (approx.)
- Country: United States
- Languages: Silent; English intertitles

A Fresh Air Romance is an American silent film produced by the Edison Company in 1912.

== Plot ==
Old Dr. Fogg has been practicing medicine in the same small town for several decades when he takes his son, a recent medical school graduate, as a partner in his practice. The young doctor quickly realizes that his father's methods are outdated, and harmful, and tries to work around them. In the process, he finds romance with one of his father's patients.

== Release ==
The film was released in the United States on October 12, 1912. It was exhibited in Aberaman, Wales in February, 1913. Around this same time, the film was still circulating through the United States, where it was being shown in places like the Dixie Theatre in Bryan, Texas.
