= George Lessey =

American actor (1879–1947)

- Lessey (right) in Hope, a Red Cross Seal Story (1912)
- Born: June 8, 1879; Amherst, Massachusetts, U.S.
- Died: June 3, 1947 (aged 67); Westbrook, Connecticut, U.S.
- Years active: 1910–1946
- Spouse: May Abbey (1911-1947) (his death)

George Lessey (June 8, 1879 – June 3, 1947) was an American actor and director of the silent era. He appeared in more than 120 films between 1910 and 1946. He also directed more than 70 films between 1913 and 1922.

Lessey was born in Amherst, Massachusetts, and as a boy he acted in theatrical productions there. He graduated from Amherst College.

For a year, Lessey was a leading man for Edison Studios, after which he directed films for the company for two years. In 1914, he joined Universal Studios as a director. He portrayed Romeo in the initial film version of Romeo and Juliet, directed the first serial, What Happened to Mary, and played the first dual role in film as twins in The Corsican Brothers.

On stage, Lessey appeared in the original Broadway production of Porgy and Bess (1935) in one of the few white roles, that of the lawyer Mr. Archdale.

In the 1930s, Lessey worked as a model for men's clothes.

Lessey was married to the former May Abbey. On June 3, 1947, Lessey died on vacation in Westbrook, Connecticut, aged 67.

== Selected filmography ==
- A Fresh Air Romance (1912, Short) - Young Doctor Fogg
- A Soldier's Duty (1912, Short) - Commanding General
- The Librarian (1912, Short) - The School Teacher (Robert Prentice)
- The Twelfth Juror (1913, Short)
- Graft (1915, Serial)
- The Purple Lady (1916, director)
- Patria (1917, Serial)
- The Eagle's Eye (1918, director)
- To Him That Hath (1918) - Henry Allen
- Twilight (1919) - Dr. Henry Charmant
- The $1,000,000 Reward (1920, director) - James Bradley
- The Harvest Moon (1920) - Jacques Vavin
- Wits vs. Wits (1920) - James Marsley
- A Divorce of Convenience (1921) - Senator Wakefield
- Is Life Worth Living? (1921) - Lawyer
- Why Girls Leave Home (1921) - Mr. Hedder
- Handcuffs or Kisses (1921) - Elias Pratt
- Rainbow (1921) - Rufus Halliday
- School Days (1921) - His Guardian - the Deacon
- The Snitching Hour (1922) - Larry
- The Silent Command (1923) - Mr. Collins
- It Is the Law (1924) - Inspector Dolan
- Scar Hanan (1925) - Bart Hutchins
- The Fool (1925) - Goodkind
- White Thunder (1925) - Sheriff Richards
- Durand of the Bad Lands (1925) - John Boyd
- Annapolis Salute (1937) - Captain Brooks (uncredited)
- ...One Third of a Nation... (1939) - Doctor (uncredited)
- Birthright (1939)
- Dr. Kildare's Strange Case (1940) - Rufus Ingersoll
- Edison, the Man (1940) - Toastmaster
- Andy Hardy Meets Debutante (1940) - Underwood
- Sporting Blood (1940) - Banker Cobb
- The Golden Fleecing (1940) - Buckley Sloan
- Boom Town (1940) - Judge
- Strike Up the Band (1940) - Mr. Morgan
- Sky Murder (1940) - Senator Monrose
- Dulcy (1940) - Judge Paroling Henry to Dulcy (uncredited)
- Hullabaloo (1940) - Mr. Arthur Jay Norton
- Gallant Sons (1940) - Judge
- Go West (1940) - Railroad President
- Blonde Inspiration (1941) - C. V. Hutchins
- Forbidden Passage (1941, Short) - American Consul in Lisbon
- Men of Boys Town (1941) - Bradford Stone
- The Big Boss (1941) - Senator Williams
- Adventure in Washington (1941) - Vice-President (uncredited)
- Moon Over Miami (1941) - William Boulton
- Sweetheart of the Campus (1941) - Dr. Hale
- Blossoms in the Dust (1941) - Mr. Keats
- We Go Fast (1941) - J.P. Hempstead
- It Started with Eve (1941) - Johnson - Hotel Guest (uncredited)
- You Belong to Me (1941) - Marshall (uncredited)
- Born to Sing (1942) - Mr. Lawson (uncredited)
- Roxie Hart (1942) - Judge Cannon
- Rings on Her Fingers (1942) - Fenwick Sr.
- The Postman Didn't Ring (1942) - Governor Marvin Winthrop (uncredited)
- The Pride of the Yankees (1942) - Mayor of New Rochelle
- The Gay Sisters (1942) - Judge Barrows
- Girl Trouble (1942) - Morgan
- Now, Voyager (1942) - Uncle Herbert (uncredited)
- Laugh Your Blues Away (1942) - Mr. Westerly
- The Crystal Ball (1943) - Judge (uncredited)
- Dixie Dugan (1943) - Sen. Patterson
- Mission to Moscow (1943) - Bill - Well-wisher (uncredited)
- Someone to Remember (1943) - College Trustee (uncredited)
- Pistol Packin' Mama (1943) - Mr. Burton
- What a Woman! (1943) - Senator Hendricks (uncredited)
- Henry Aldrich, Boy Scout (1944) - Commissioner Towers (uncredited)
- None Shall Escape (1944) - Presiding Judge
- Charlie Chan in the Secret Service (1944) - Slade (uncredited)
- Cover Girl (1944) - Minister (uncredited)
- Buffalo Bill (1944) - Mr. Schyler Vandervere
- The Adventures of Mark Twain (1944) - Henry H. Rogers (uncredited)
- Roger Touhy, Gangster (1944) - Judge (uncredited)
- Bride by Mistake (1944) - Business Man (uncredited)
- Wilson (1944) - Senator (uncredited)
- Sweet and Low-Down (1944) - Norman Wilson (uncredited)
- Eadie Was a Lady (1945) - Rev. Ames (uncredited)
- One More Tomorrow (1946) - Men's Club Member (uncredited)
- The Missing Lady (1946) - James Douglas (uncredited)
