= Helping John =

- Directed by: Harold M. Shaw
- Written by: Bannister Merwin
- Starring: Bigelow Cooper; Miriam Nesbitt; Barry O'Moore; Robert Brower
- Distributed by: Edison
- Release date: August 28, 1912
- Running time: 1 reel; approximately 1000 feet
- Country: United States
- Languages: Silent; English intertitles

Helping John is a 1912 short American silent comedy written Bannister Merwin, directed by Harold M. Shaw, and produced by the Edison Company at its main studio in New York City, in the Bronx.

== Production ==
Although some modern film references credit Bannister Merwin with directing Helping John, it was actually Harold M. Shaw who served as the motion picture's director. In 1912, in its semimonthly newsletter The Kinetogram, the Edison Company in the August 15 issue recognizes Merwin as the screenwriter of the project with the commonly used "By" credit for story writers; however, in the newsletter's next issue, on September 1, Edison announces Shaw's recent promotion to director at the studio and publicly credits and compliments him for directing Helping John along with other films produced in the summer of 1912:

It is with great pleasure—though not unalloyed with regret—that we announce the appointment of Harold Shaw as a director of Edison photo-plays. The regret arises from the fact that his new duties will prevent Mr. Shaw from appearing in pictures, as all of his time will be devoted to directing...In his new capacity, he has already produced several films, among them "The Librarian," "The Harbinger of Peace," "The Cub Reporter," "Helping John," and "The Dam Builder." Any one of these pictures might be the work of a veteran director, so excellently have they all been assembled and worked out in detail....

== Release and distribution ==
The film was released in the United States on August 28, 1912. By December that year, it reached venues in New Zealand, with screenings in Canterbury at the beginning of the month and in Whanganui, where the local newspaper on December 26 promoted Helping John as "A Comedy Drama, written by Bannister Mervin [sic]". It played in Masterton the next month and at His Majesty's Theatre in Stratford, Taranaki in February 1913. Then, in March, it was presented on a twin bill with another comedy, Holding the Fort, at King's Theatre in Thames.
