= Me and Me Moke =

- Directed by: Harold M. Shaw
- Written by: Richard Ganthony
- Starring: Edna Flugrath; Gerald Ames; Hubert Willis
- Production company: London Film Company
- Distributed by: Jury Films; Universal Pictures (US)
- Release date: February 1916
- Country: United Kingdom
- Languages: Silent; English intertitles

Me and Me Moke is a 1916 British silent comedy film directed by Harold M. Shaw and starring Edna Flugrath, Gerald Ames and Hubert Willis. The screenplay concerns a young man from a wealthy background who takes a job working as a porter at the fruit and vegetable market in Covent Garden.

== Cast ==
- Edna Flugrath as Kitty Kingsland
- Gerald Ames as Harry Masterman
- Hubert Willis as Labby
- Sydney Fairbrother as Mammy
- Lewis Gilbert as Flash Hawkins
- Douglas Munro as James Hilliard
- Gwynne Herbert as Mrs. Kingsland
