= The Heart of Sister Ann =

1915 film by Harold M. Shaw

The Heart of Sister Ann is a 1915 British silent drama film directed by Harold M. Shaw and starring Edna Flugrath, Hayford Hobbs and Guy Newall. Its plot involves an orphaned dancer who repays the sister brought her up her by marrying the man she loves – after becoming pregnant by a Russian novelist.

This marked the film debut of Newall who went on to found one of the leading British silent-era film studios.
