= Little Brother of God =

1922 film

- Directed by: Floyd Martin Thornton
- Written by: Leslie Howard Gordon (novel and screenplay)
- Production company: Stoll Pictures
- Distributed by: Stoll Pictures
- Release date: April 1922
- Country: United Kingdom
- Languages: Silent; English intertitles

Little Brother of God is a 1922 British silent crime film directed by F. Martin Thornton.

== Cast ==
- Alec Fraser as Donald Wainwright
- Lionelle Howard as Douglas Wainwright
- Victor McLaglen as King Kennidy
- Varies Nickawa as Jean Marie
- Fred Rains as Father Joseph
- Fred Raynham as Bliss
- Valia as Helen McKee
- Robert Vallis as Johnny Jackpine
- Bertie Wright as Etienne Parouche

== Bibliography ==
- Goble, Alan. The Complete Index to Literary Sources in Film. Walter de Gruyter, 1999.
