= Liberty Hall (film) =

- Directed by: Harold M. Shaw
- Written by: R.C. Carton (play); Bannister Merwin
- Starring: Ben Webster; Edna Flugrath; O. B. Clarence
- Production company: London Film Company
- Distributed by: Jury Films
- Release date: December 1914
- Country: United Kingdom
- Languages: Silent; English intertitles

Liberty Hall is a 1914 British silent comedy film directed by Harold M. Shaw and starring Ben Webster, Edna Flugrath and O. B. Clarence. It is an adaptation of the 1892 play of the same title by R. C. Carton.

The film had 3 reels.

The film revolves around a rich heir who pretends to be the lodger of a young woman who receives unsolicited attentions.

The film was theatrically shown in 1917 in the United States as a double feature with Skinner's Dress Suit.

== Cast ==
- Ben Webster as Sir Hartley Chilworth
- Edna Flugrath as Ann Chilworth
- O. B. Clarence as Todman Crafer
- Ranee Brooks as Blanche Chilworth
- Douglas Munro as Briginshaw
- Langhorn Burton as Gerald Haringay
- Gwynne Herbert as Mrs. Crafer
- Hubert Willis as Pedrick

== Bibliography ==
- Goble, Alan. The Complete Index to Literary Sources in Film. Walter de Gruyter, 1999.
