= Beauty and the Barge (1914 film) =

1914 British film by Harold M. Shaw

- Directed by: Harold M. Shaw
- Written by: W.W. Jacobs
- Based on: Beauty and the Barge by W. W. Jacobs
- Starring: Cyril Maude; Lillian Logan; Gregory Scott; Mary Brough
- Production company: London Film Company
- Release date: 1914
- Country: United Kingdom

Beauty and the Barge is a 1914 British silent comedy film directed by Harold M. Shaw and starring Cyril Maude, Lillian Logan and Gregory Scott. It is an adaptation of the 1905 play Beauty and the Barge by W. W. Jacobs. A sound version of the same story was released in 1937.

== Cast ==
- Cyril Maude as Captain Barley
- Lillian Logan as Ethel Smedley
- Gregory Scott as Lieutenant Seton Boyne
- Mary Brough as Mrs. Baldwin
- Judd Green as Dibbs
