= False Evidence (1922 film) =

1922 film

False Evidence is a 1922 British silent drama film directed by Harold M. Shaw and starring Edna Flugrath, Cecil Humphreys and Teddy Arundell. It was adapted from an 1896 novel by Phillips Oppenheim.

== Cast ==
- Edna Flugrath - Maude Deveraux
- Cecil Humphreys - Rupert Deveraux
- Teddy Arundell - Hilton
- E. Holman Clark - Sir Frances Arbuthnot
- Frank Petley - Herbert Arbuthnot
- Eric Lugg - Hugh Arbuthnot
- Constance Rayner - Marian Arbuthnot
