= Holding the Fort (film) =

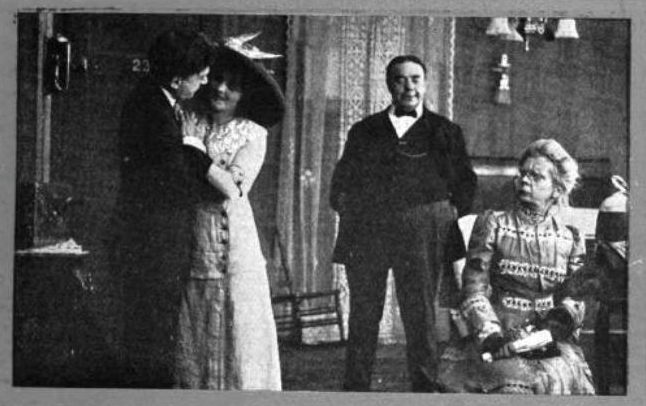
- Directed by: C.J. Williams
- Written by: Bannister Merwin
- Starring: Elsie MacLeod; Edward Boulden; Henry Tomlinson; Frank A. Lyons; Alice Washburn
- Distributed by: Edison
- Release date: August 14, 1912
- Running time: 1,000 feet (approx.)
- Country: United States
- Languages: Silent; English intertitles

Holding the Fort is a short American silent comedy produced by the Edison Company in 1912.

== Release ==
The film was released in the United States on August 14, 1912. A week after premiering in major coastal markets, the film was seen in smaller markets like Missoula, Montana. It played in Pendleton, Oregon, a month later, and in Cairo, Illinois, in October.

In December, 1912, Holding the Fort was shown in Wellington, New Zealand, at the People's Picture Palace. It was exhibited at the T.P. Electric Theatre, Forester's Hall, in Masterton a month later. In March, 1913, it was exhibited in Thames, New Zealand, as part of a program that included another Merwin-penned comedy, Helping John.
