= Mr. Lyndon at Liberty =

1915 film by Harold M. Shaw

- Directed by: Harold M. Shaw
- Based on: Mr. Lyndon at Liberty by Victor Bridges
- Release date: 1915
- Country: United Kingdom
- Language: Silent

Mr. Lyndon at Liberty is a 1915 British silent thriller film directed by Harold M. Shaw and starring Edna Flugrath, Fred Groves and Charles Rock. It was based on the 1915 novel by Victor Bridges.

== Plot summary ==
With the help of a secret service agent a man on the run is able to expose a respected Doctor as an enemy spy.

== Cast ==
- Edna Flugrath - Joyce Aylmer
- Fred Groves - Tom Morrison
- Charles Rock - Doctor McMurtie
- S. Jensen - George Marwood
- Manora Thew - Sonia Savoroff
- Harry Welchman - Neil Lyndon
