= Lillian Logan =

British actress

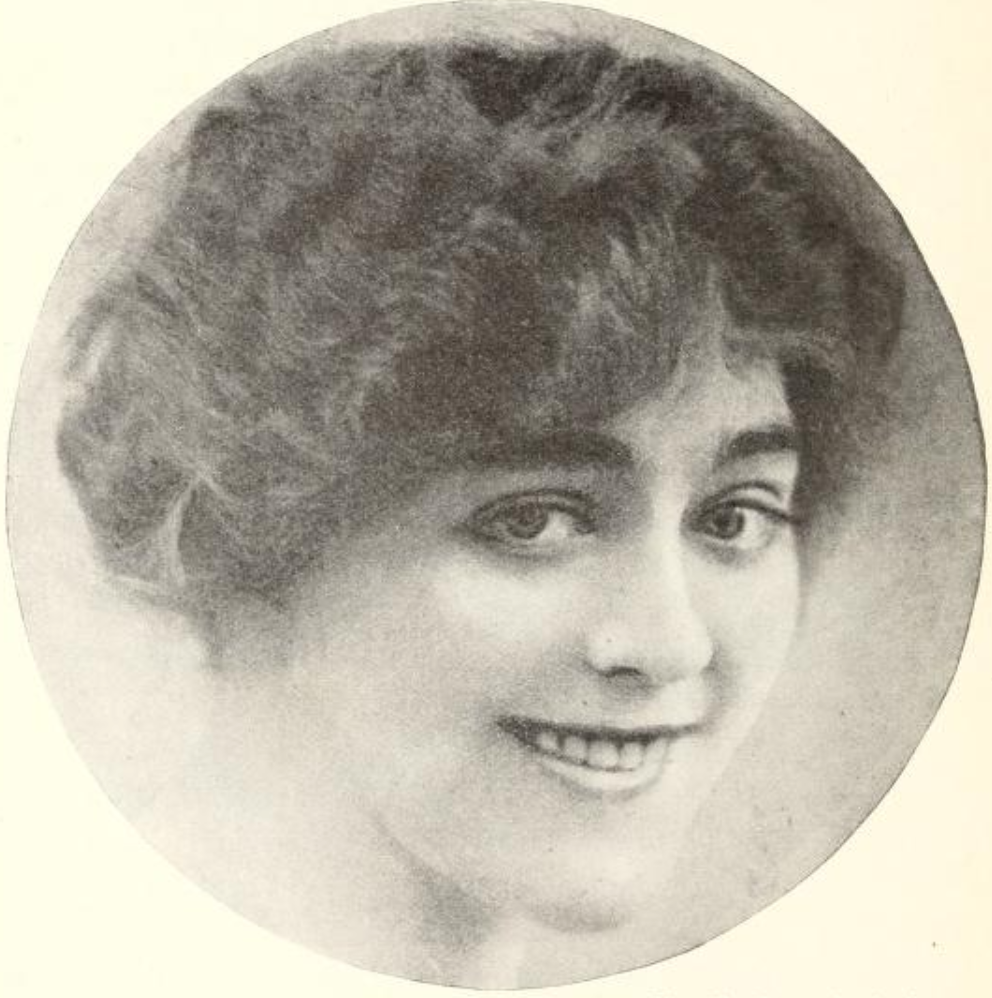
Lillian Logan, from a 1913 publication

Lillian Logan was an American actress based in Britain. She was born in Chicago, and studied as a singer in Milan and Berlin.

== Selected filmography ==
- The Pink Opera Cloak (1913) - Laura Keene
- The House of Temperley (1913)
- Lawyer Quince (1914)
- Her Children (1914)
- Beauty and the Barge (1914)
- Branscombe's Pal (1914)
