= The Derby Winner =

1915 British film by Harold M. Shaw

- Directed by: Harold M. Shaw
- Based on: The Derby Winner by: Henry Hamilton; Augustus Harris; Cecil Raleigh
- Release date: 1915
- Country: United Kingdom
- Language: Silent

The Derby Winner is a 1915 British silent sports drama film directed by Harold M. Shaw and starring Edna Flugrath, Gerald Ames and Mary Dibley. It is an adaptation of an 1895 play The Derby Winner by Henry Hamilton, Augustus Harris and Cecil Raleigh (which was retitled as The Sporting Duchess in the United States).

== Cast ==
- Edna Flugrath as May Aylmer
- Gerald Ames as Captain Douglas Desburn
- Mary Dibley as Lady Muriel Fortescue
- Lewis Gilbert as Colonel Donnelly
- Christine Rayner as Annette Donnelly
- Wyndham Guise as Joe Aylmer
- Gwynne Herbert as Duchess
- J. L. Mackay as Captain Geoffrey Mostyn
- George Bellamy as Rupert Leigh
- Winifred Dennis as Mrs. Donnelly
- Harry Hargreaves as Doctor Cyprian Streatfield
- Will Asher as Dick Hand
