= Stormflower =

1922 film

- Directed by: Bert Wynne
- Screenplay by: Anne Merwin
- Produced by: A. Randall Terraneau
- Starring: Hayford Hobbs; Joan Ferry; Philip Hewland
- Production company: A.R.T.
- Release date: 1922
- Country: United Kingdom

Stormflower is a 1922 British silent film directed by Bert Wynne and written by Anne Merwin.

== Plot ==
Husband John Fulton casts his wife Cecily out after he suspects her of an affair, not knowing she is pregnant. After Cecily dies, Peter unknowingly adopts his own biological daughter named Stormflower. However, John disowns Stormflower as well when she weds Peter, an officer who dies during the Great War.

== Starring ==
- Hayford Hobbs as Peter
- Joan Ferry as Stormflower
- Philip Hewland as John Fulton
- Beatrix Templeton as Cecily Fulton
