= Like Knights of Old =

- Directed by: C.J. Williams
- Starring: Edna Flugrath; Augustus Phillips; Charles Ogle
- Distributed by: Edison
- Release date: October 16, 1912
- Running time: 650 ft. (approximately 10 minutes)
- Country: United States
- Languages: Silent; English intertitles

Like Knights of Old is a short American silent comedy film produced by the Edison Company in 1912.

== Release ==
The film was released in the United States on August 14, 1912.
