= The Land Beyond the Sunset =

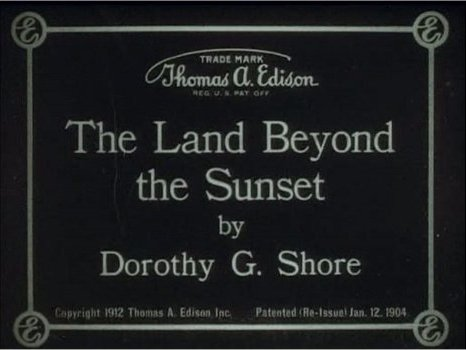
- Film's original title card with credit to the author of the story
- Directed by: Harold M. Shaw
- Written by: Dorothy G. Shore
- Starring: Martin Fuller; Mrs. William Bechtel; Walter Edwin; Bigelow Cooper
- Distributed by: Thomas A. Edison, Inc.
- Release date: October 28, 1912
- Running time: 1 reel (1000 feet); originally 14-15 minutes
- Country: United States
- Languages: Silent film English intertitles

The Land Beyond the Sunset is a 1912 short, silent drama film which tells the story of a young boy, oppressed by his grandmother, who goes on an outing in the country with a social welfare group. It stars Martin Fuller, Mrs. William Bechtel, Walter Edwin, and Bigelow Cooper. Produced by Edison Studios in collaboration with the Fresh Air Fund, the screenplay was written by Dorothy G. Shore and directed by Harold M. Shaw.

In 2000, The Land Beyond the Sunset was selected for preservation in the United States National Film Registry by the Library of Congress as being "culturally, historically, or aesthetically significant". It is included on the DVD Treasures from American Film Archives (2000).

== Plot ==
PLAY copy of film; runtime 00:12:45.

Joe is an impoverished New York newsboy who lives with his abusive grandmother. While selling papers, he is given a ticket for a children's excursion sponsored by the Fresh Air Fund. The next morning, Joe sneaks out of his tenement home to join the excursion, where he sees the countryside and the ocean for the first time. After a picnic, an adult volunteer reads to the children a fanciful tale from a story book, a tale about a young prince who is beaten by an old witch. A group of fairies rescues the boy, take him to a boat, and sail off for "the Land Beyond the Sunset, where he lived happily ever after." Joe imagines himself as the boy in the story. When the other children and adults begin their return to the city, Joe manages to get the book, linger, and then hide, afraid that his grandmother will be mad at him and dreading the prospect of returning to his wretched life in the city's slums. Next he wanders to the beach, where he finds a rowboat and decides to embark alone on a voyage to the wonderful, far-off land. He pushes the oarless boat into the water and climbs aboard. The film ends with a distant view of Joe, holding the storybook against his chest, slowly drifting out to sea toward the horizon and most likely to his death.

== Cast ==
- Martin Fuller as Joe, the Newsboy
- Mrs. William Bechtel as Joe's Grandmother
- Walter Edwin as Manager of the Fresh Air Fund
- Ethel Jewett as Committee Woman
- Elizabeth Miller as Committee Woman
- Gladys Du Pell as Committee Woman
- Margery Bonney Erskine as Committee Woman (as Mrs. Wallace Erskine)
- Bigelow Cooper as The Minister

== Production ==
The film was shot in studio at the Edison Company's plant at Decatur Avenue and Oliver Place in New York City, in the Bronx, as well as on location in a Bronx-area park that afforded a view of Long Island Sound.
