= The Ring and the Rajah =

- Directed by: Harold M. Shaw
- Written by: Anne Merwin
- Starring: Edna Flugrath; Arthur Holmes-Gore; Vincent Clive
- Production company: Florence Turner Productions
- Distributed by: London Film Company; Universal Pictures (US)
- Release date: March 1914
- Country: United Kingdom
- Languages: Silent; English intertitles

The Ring and the Rajah is a 1914 British silent drama film directed by Harold M. Shaw and starring Edna Flugrath, Arthur Holmes-Gore and Vincent Clive.

It was written by Anne Merwin.

== Cast ==
- Edna Flugrath as Edith Blayne
- Arthur Holmes-Gore as The Rajah
- Vincent Clive as Captain Blayne
- Edward O'Neill as Ferak

== Bibliography ==
- Geoffrey Nowell-Smith. The Oxford History of World Cinema. Oxford University Press, 1996.
