= Lawyer Quince (1914 film) =

1914 film by Harold M. Shaw

Lawyer Quince is a 1914 British silent comedy film directed by Harold M. Shaw and starring Charles Rock, Lillian Logan and Gregory Scott. It was made by the London Film Company based on a short story by W. W. Jacobs.

== Cast ==
- Charles Rock - Lawyer Quince
- Lillian Logan - Celia Rose
- Gregory Scott - Ned Quince
- Mary Brough - Mrs Quince
- Judd Green - Farmer Rose
