= Bertie Wright =

British actor (1871–1960)

Albert James Matthew Wright (6 February 1871 – 7 March 1960), known as Bertie Wright, was a British actor of the silent era. Wright was born in Blackburn, Lancashire, England, and died on 7 March 1960, in Sydney, New South Wales, Australia.

== Partial filmography ==
- A Little Bit of Fluff (1919)
- General John Regan (1921)
- The Wheels of Chance (1922)
- A Sailor Tramp (1922)
- Little Brother of God (1922)
- Young Lochinvar (1923)
- The Royal Oak (1923)
- The Rest Cure (1923)
