= De Voortrekkers =

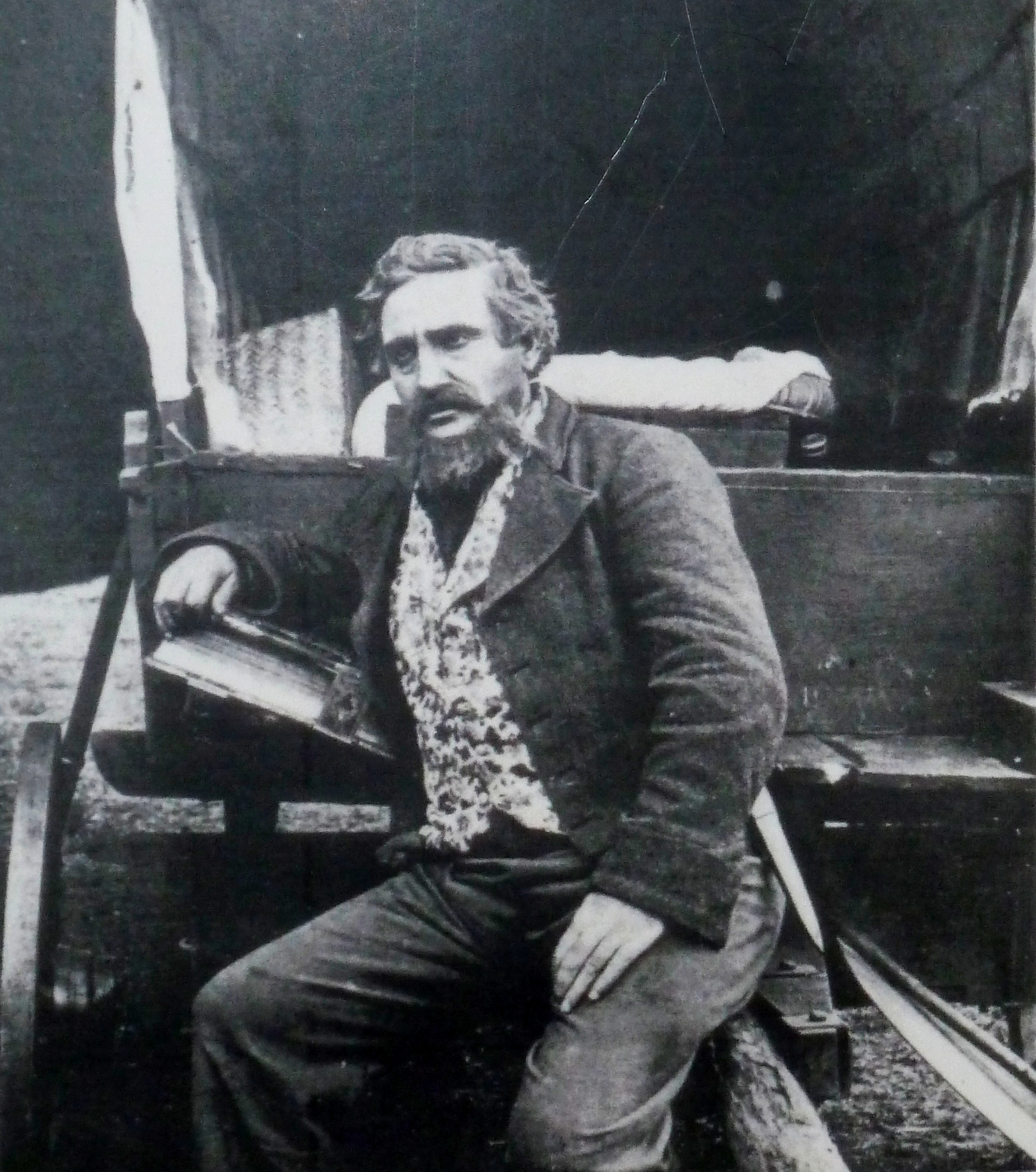
- Dick Cruikshanks as Piet Retief
- Directed by: Harold M. Shaw
- Screenplay by: Gustav Preller, Harold M. Shaw
- Produced by: African Film Productions
- Starring: Dick Cruikshanks; Percy Marmont; Edna Flugrath; Harold M. Shaw; Goba
- Cinematography: Henry Howse
- Release date: 14 December 1916
- Running time: Approximately two hours in full original cut; 54 minutes in later releases to foreign cinemas
- Country: South Africa

De Voortrekkers

De Voortrekkers is a 1916 silent film recognized as the first epic in South Africa's motion-picture history and also that nation's oldest surviving feature film. Produced by African Film Productions and directed by Harold M. Shaw, it portrays the Boers' "Great Trek" of the 1830s, concluding with a hegemonic recreation of the Battle of Blood River that occurred on 16 December 1838, when a few hundred armed Afrikaners defeated several thousand Zulus. Descendants of the Dutch-speaking voortrekkers or "pioneers" who participated in the Great Trek revered the film and used it to commemorate the event, which forms part of a highly contentious period in South Africa's history. Afrikaners presented it in school classrooms for decades and screened it annually at social events marking the battle's anniversary.

De Voortrekkers premiered in South Africa at Krugersdorp on 14 December 1916, just two days before the battle's 78th anniversary. It was later distributed in an abbreviated form to cinemas in England, the United States, Canada, and elsewhere outside Africa under the title Winning a Continent. Intertitles used in the original film and in later releases employ a split-screen format that presents texts in both English and Afrikaans.
