= BioScope: South Asian Screen Studies =

- Discipline: Communication studies
- Language: English
- Edited by: Ravi S Vasudevan, Rosie Thomas, S V Srinivas, Debashree Mukherjee, Lotte Hoek and Salma Siddique

Publication details
- History: 2010
- Publisher: Sage Publications India Pvt. Ltd. (India)
- Frequency: Biannual
- Impact factor: 0.3

Standard abbreviations
- ISO 4: BioScope: South Asian Screen Stud.

Indexing
- ISSN: 0974-9276 (print); 0976-352X (web)

Links
- Journal homepage; Online access; Online archive

BioScope: South Asian Screen Studies is a blind peer-reviewed journal published twice in a year by Sage in association with University of Westminster and Sarai/Centre for the Study of Developing Societies. It is edited by Ravi S Vasudevan, Rosie Thomas, S V Srinivas, Debashree Mukherjee, Lotte Hoek and Salma Siddique

This journal is a member of the Committee on Publication Ethics (COPE).

== Abstracting and indexing ==
BioScope: South Asian Screen Studies is abstracted and indexed in:

- Bibliography of Asian Studies
- CCC
- Clarivate Analytics: Arts & Humanities Citation Index
- DeepDyve
- Dutch-KB
- EBSCO
- Indian Citation Index
- J-Gate
- OCLC
- Portico
- Pro-Quest-RSP
- UGC-CARE (GROUP II)
- SCOPUS
