= The Pursuit of Pamela =

1920 film

The Pursuit of Pamela is a 1920 British silent comedy drama film directed by Harold M. Shaw, starring Edna Flugrath, Templar Powell and Douglas Munro, and based on a play by C. B. Fernald.

== Premise ==
Following her wedding a bride runs away from her much older husband and goes after a younger man who gone to the Far East.

== Cast ==
- Edna Flugrath - Pamela Dodder
- Templar Powell - Allan Graeme
- Douglas Munro - John Dodder
- Ada Palmer - Miss Astby
- Hubert Willis - Peter Dodder
- Wyndham Guise - Scot McVelie
- Ma Fue - Fah Nin
