= Hearts and Diamonds (1912 film) =

1912 film

- Directed by: Harold M. Shaw
- Written by: Herbert E. Morgan
- Starring: Augustus Phillips; Edna Flugrath; Robert Brower
- Distributed by: Edison
- Release date: September 20, 1912
- Running time: 1000 ft (approx.)
- Country: United States
- Languages: Silent; English intertitles

Hearts and Diamonds is a short American silent drama film produced by the Edison Company in 1912.

== Release ==
Hearts and Diamonds was released in the United States on September 20, 1912.
