= London Pride (film) =

1920 film

- Directed by: Harold M. Shaw
- Written by: Arthur Lyons and Gladys Unger
- Starring: Edna Flugrath, Fred Groves and O. B. Clarence
- Production company: London Film Company
- Release date: 1920
- Country: United Kingdom

London Pride is a 1920 British silent comedy film, directed by Harold M. Shaw, and starring Edna Flugrath, Fred Groves and O. B. Clarence. It was based on a play by Arthur Lyons and Gladys Unger.

== Cast ==
- Edna Flugrath - Cherry
- Fred Groves - Cuthbert Tunks
- O. B. Clarence - Mr. Tunks
- Mary Brough - Mrs. Tunks
- Constance Backner - Maud Murphy
- Frank Stanmore - Mooney
- Douglas Munro - Garlic
- Mary Dibley - Mrs. Topleigh-Trevor
- Cyril Percival - Menzies
- Teddy Arundell - Bill Guppy
