= Dick Cruikshanks =

British film actor and director (1874–1947)

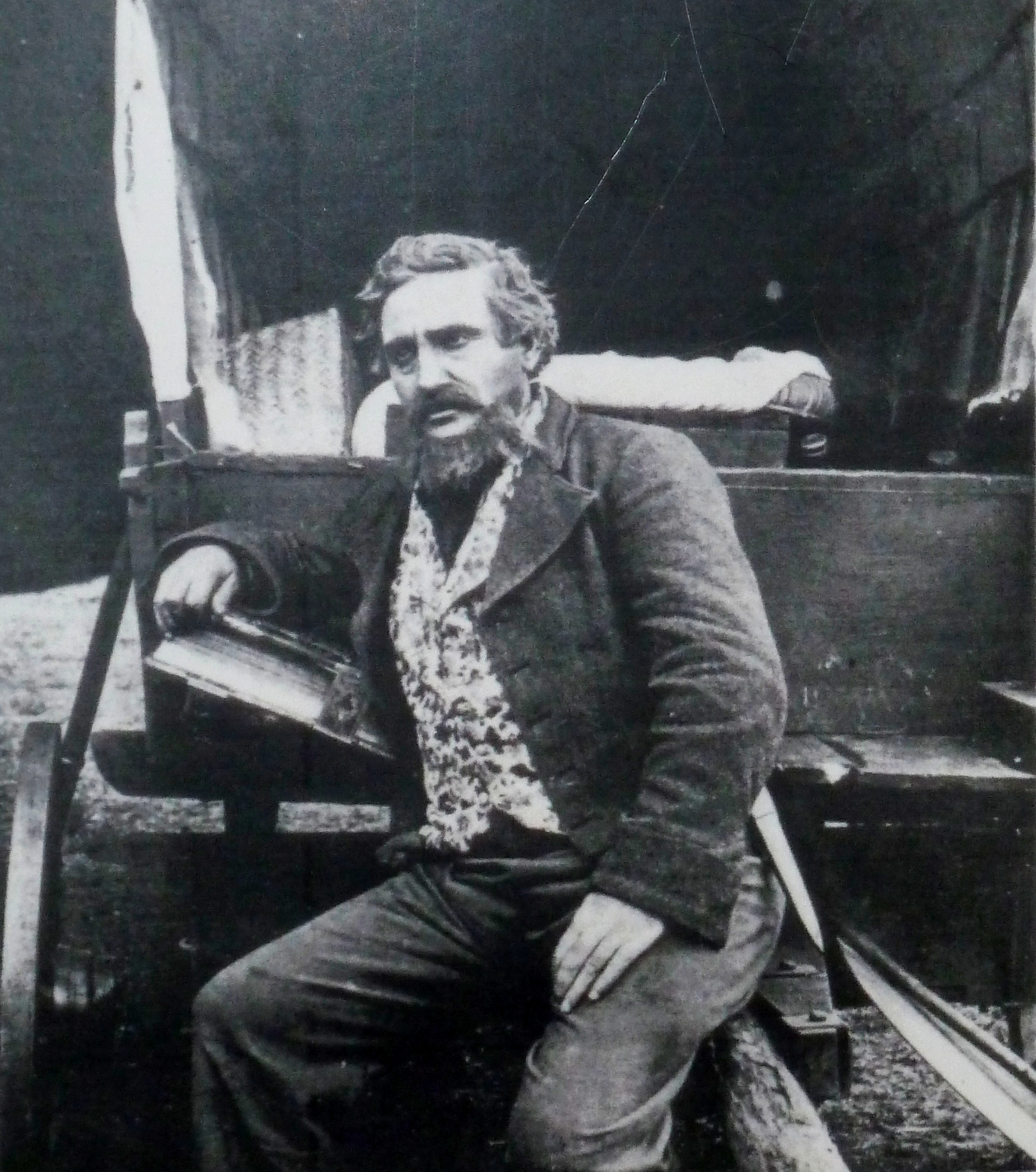
- Cruikshanks in De Voortrekkers as Piet Retief, 1916
- Born: 1874; South Africa
- Died: March 3, 1947 (aged 72–73)
- Occupations: Actor, director

Dick Cruikshanks (1874 – March 3, 1947) was a South African actor and director.

His work includes five short comedies filmed in 1917, three of them with African actors.

== Partial filmography ==
=== Actor ===
- De Voortrekkers (1916) as Piet Retief
- Swallow (1918) as Jan Botmar

=== Director ===
- The Major's Dilemma (1917)
- The Mealie Kids (1917)
- The Piccanini's Christmas (1917)
- Zulu-Town-Comedies (1917)
- Bond and Word (1918)
- The Bridge (1918)
- Fallen Leaves (1919)
- Prester John (1920)
- The Vulture's Prey (1921)
- The Blue Lagoon (1923)
