= Zonk! =

South African musical film

Zonk! is a 1950 South African musical film directed by Hyman Kirstein and produced by African Film Productions. It features black performers doing American style numbers.

The film shows Broadway's influence. It is one of four films made between 1949 and 1951 documenting original music and performances by Africans. Jacqueline Maingard of the University of Bristol analysed the film in an article titled "Cinematic Images of Black Sexual Identity".

== Cast ==
- Sylvester Phahlane
- Daniel Lekoape
- Fiver Kelly
- Richard Majola
- Hessie Kerry
- Timothy Zwane
- Moffat Tlale
- Laura Gagashane
- Geoffrey Tsebe
- Manhattan Stars
- Zonk Band led by Samuel Maile
