= Harold M. Shaw =

American film director (1877–1926)

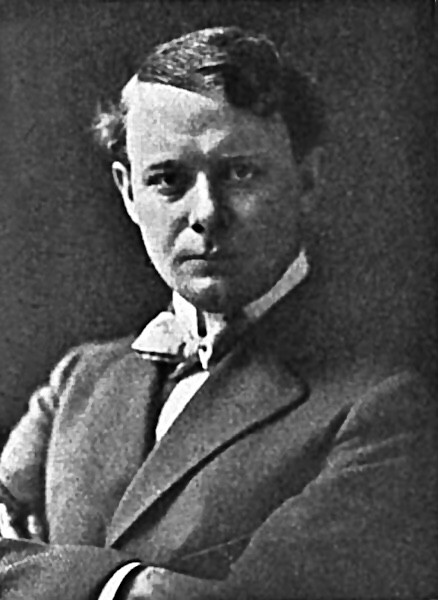
- The Edison Kinetogram, 1912
- Born: Harold Marvin Shaw; November 3, 1877; Brownsville, Tennessee, United States
- Died: January 30, 1926 (aged 48); Los Angeles, California, United States
- Resting place: Hollywood Forever Cemetery, Hollywood
- Occupations: Stage performer, screen actor and director, screenwriter
- Years active: 1894–1926
- Spouse(s): Myrtle Chapman (m. 1900–div. before 1910); Edna Flugrath (m. 1917–1926; his death)

Harold Marvin Shaw (also cited in some records as Henry Marvin Shaw; November 3, 1877 – January 30, 1926) was an American stage performer, film actor, screenwriter, and director during the silent era. (Note: The vast majority of records cite Shaw's full name as Harold Marvin Shaw, although a microfilm copy of his official 1926 California death certificate records his name as Henry Marvin Shaw. No original Tennessee birth certificate has yet been found that confirms his official birth name.) A native of Tennessee, he worked in theatrical plays and vaudeville for 16 years before he began acting in motion pictures for Edison Studios in New York City in 1910 and then started regularly directing shorts there two years later. Shaw next served briefly as a director for Independent Moving Pictures (IMP) in New York before moving to England in May 1913 to be "chief producer" for the newly established London Film Company. During World War I, he relocated to South Africa, where in 1916 he directed the film De Voortrekkers in cooperation with African Film Productions, Limited. Shaw also established his own production company while in South Africa, completing there two more releases, The Rose of Rhodesia in 1918 and the comedy Thoroughbreds All in 1919. After directing films once again in England under contract with Stoll Pictures, he finally returned to the United States in 1922 and later directed several screen projects for Metro Pictures in California before his death in Los Angeles in 1926. During his 15-year film career, Shaw worked on more than 125 films either as a director, actor, or screenwriter.

== Early life and stage career ==
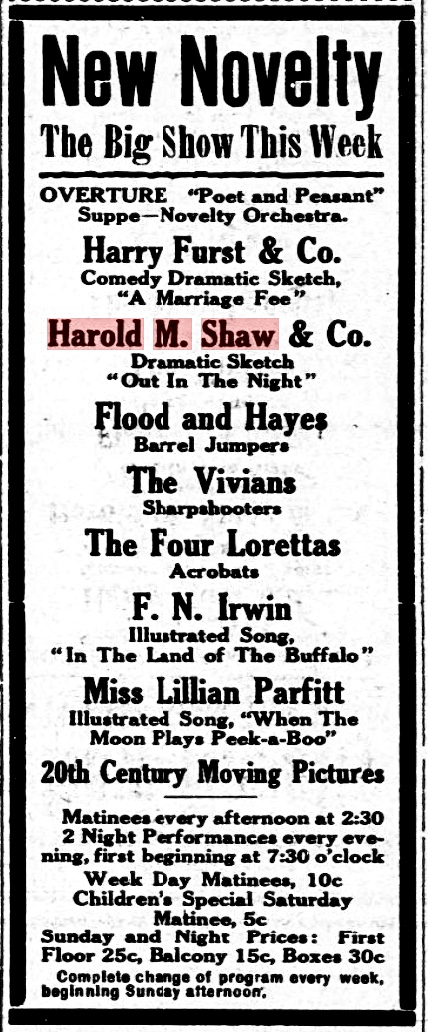
Newspaper ad for vaudeville show with Shaw, 1908

Born in Brownsville, Tennessee in 1877, Harold was the child of Oliver A. Shaw of Kentucky and his first wife, Zula Waggoner, (Note: In government records Zula Waggoner's maiden name is also cited as Waggner and as Wagner in Harold Shaw's 1926 death certificate.) who was also a native of Kentucky. By 1886, young Harold had relocated with his family to northern California, to the Oakland area in Alameda County, where his father worked as a telegraph operator and by the early 1900s as an automobile "tyre" salesman. (Note: Harold Shaw’s father married twice, first to Zula Waggoner in 1875 and then to Laura Gertrude Plummer in California in 1887. Due to the total destruction of the United States Census of 1890 by fire, the composition of the Shaw family in Oakland that year is unknown. It appears that Harold's mother Zula died before or shortly after Oliver Shaw relocated to California, where he then wed Laura, a California native, the next year.) Harold received his public education in Oakland, became interested in theatre productions there in his teenage years, and started acting professionally on stage in 1894. Over the next 16 years he traveled extensively performing with various stock companies and in vaudeville. By 1898 he had already established himself as a "high-class" and "genteel" entertainer, as one generally recognized in the print media as among "the dramatic favorites" of vaudeville audiences. The Kentucky Irish American, for example, the local newspaper in Louisville, informs its readers in its August 20, 1898 issue about Shaw's upcoming performances at the city's Buckingham Theater:

Lovers of vaudeville, pure, select and high-class, with no burlesque or horseplays to detract from its merits, will be amply provided for at the Buckingham the coming week, commencing with the matinee to-morrow, when Girard's Inter-Ocean Vaudevilles open for a week's engagement. It is a pleasure to note the many names of well-known and well-liked vaudeville stars combined in one show...Deservedly heading the bill will be found Miss Grace Emmet and Harold M. Shaw, the dramatic favorites who, assisted by the little comedian, Eddie Russell, will present a sketch by Arthur J. Lamb, entitled "Why Papa Consented." It can be taken for granted that this will be a treat in the way of genteel comedy.

Shaw's years of popular and critical success on the vaudeville stage led to more and more offers for leading roles in touring productions as well as supporting roles in the "legitimate" theatre, including Broadway productions. He performed in 1904 on Broadway in the romantic drama Olympe, which was presented at the Knickerbocker Theatre in January and February. In that play he performed in the supporting role of "Bompain", a hairdresser. During that time, Shaw's experience and continuing successes in all forms of stage production convinced him to form his own traveling group, Harold M. Shaw and Company, a venture that generated enough personal wealth for him that in San Francisco in August 1906 he bought a building on a two-acre site at 1303 East 14th Street and made plans to renovate the structure and convert it into a private hotel.

== Films ==
By 1910, Shaw decided to expand his entertainment career into acting in motion pictures or, as they were often called in the early silent era, "photoplays". His first screen work was in shorts for Edison Studios, all filmed at the company's main production facility in the Bronx in New York City and on location elsewhere in the city or at nearby sites in New Jersey. While some modern film references include a pair of 1909 Edison releases in Shaw's filmographies, none of those references cite period sources or documents preserved in film archives that confirm he actually performed in those two productions. (Note: The online film reference IMDb (Internet Movie Database) lists the two 1909 Edison shorts—Lochinvar, released in August that year, and A Rose of the Tenderloin, in November—as productions in which Harold Shaw performed. No period trade publications or studio records, however, have thus far been located to verify that he appeared in either of those now-lost films. Also, as referenced in this page's narrative, the February 15, 1912 issue of The Edison Kinetogram states that Shaw began working for the company "for the past two years.") A profile of Shaw included in a 1912 issue of The Edison Kinetogram states that Shaw by then had been "appearing in our productions by special arrangement, for the past two years". The studio newsletter also notes that it was not until January 1912 when such special arrangements ended and the experienced performer became an official member of the Edison Stock Company, the studio's select lineup of full-time actors. Up to that point, during 1910 and 1911, Shaw continued to split his time between his projects for Edison and continuing his stage work in New York and in other locations across the country.

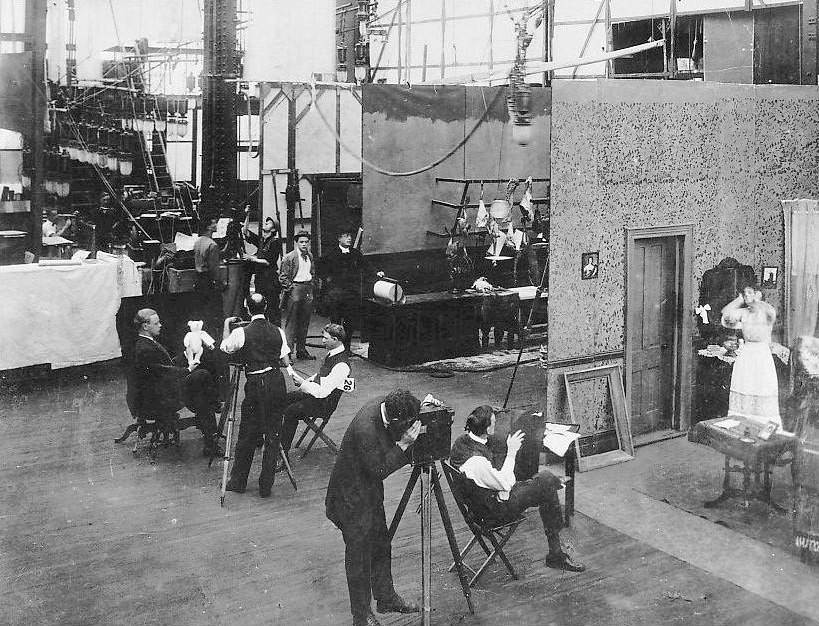
Inside Edison's busy studio in the Bronx, c. 1912; Shaw is seated with paperwork numbered "26" tucked under his arm. Also present is fellow director Charles Brabin, seated while supervising the film being shot on the right-hand set.

Trade publications and other records, including a surviving print of the 1910 Edison film The Attack on the Mill, confirm Shaw's work at the studio that year. The 11-minute melodrama, which is set during the 1870 Franco-Prussian War, was originally released in the United States on August 12, 1910. Later, when Edison distributed theatrical prints to Europe, those in the Netherlands included Dutch intertitles and were advertised and screened under a different title, De Grootmoedige molenaar ("The Generous Miller"). One of those Dutch prints is preserved today in the Netherlands, in the archives of the Eye Film Institute. In the film's opening sequence, Shaw, who is in heavy "old-man's" makeup and attired in a padded light-colored trench coat, dominates the foreground action. (Note: The title frame of the Dutch copy of The Attack on the Mill carries the date "1907", which is likely Edison's original copyright date on the screenplay, although it could be, but less likely, a misdating that occurred when the 1910 release was duplicated months or even years later.)

Edison, like other studios in those early days of the silent period, produced films at seemingly breakneck speed, often completing productions in a matter of days and at times in a single day. Shaw's acting work in both uncredited and credited role was therefore equally prolific after joining Edison. He acted much more frequently in studio productions during the latter half of 1911, and in November that year was credited for his role in Edison's adaptation of Robert Louis Stevenson's 1888 novel The Black Arrow. In that period, he performed in a wide range of other screenplays. He portrayed, as a few examples, the title character's uncle in the light comedy Mary's Masquerade; starred in the historical drama The Death of Nathan Hale; played the title character in The Kid from the Klondike; was a major supporting player in The Reform Candidate; co-starred with Mary Fuller in The Modern Dianas; co-starred in an adaptation of British author Charles Reade's 1866 novel Foul Play; portrayed a Continental officer in How Mrs. Murray Saved the American Army; played a central character in The Awakening of John Bond, a story highlighting urban poverty and the scourge of tuberculosis; and starred in the holiday drama Santa Claus and the Clubman.

=== Directing at Edison, for the World's Best Film Company, and at IMP, 1912–1913 ===
In 1912, Shaw continued to act in Edison productions like The Corsican Brothers, The Bachelor's Waterloo, The Nurse, Tony's Oath of Vengeance, The Patent Housekeeper, A Man in the Making, and other assorted dramas and comedies, although the studio by mid-summer of that year elevated him to the full-time position of director. In the September 1, 1912 issue of its semimonthly newsletter The Edison Kinetogram, the company formally announced its recent promotion of Shaw:

It is with great pleasure—though not unalloyed with regret—that we announce the appointment of Harold Shaw as a director of Edison photo-plays. The regret arises from the fact that his new duties will prevent Mr. Shaw from appearing in pictures, as all of his time will be devoted to directing...
In his new capacity, he has already produced several films, among them "The Librarian," "The Harbinger of Peace," "The Cub Reporter," "Helping John," and "The Dam Builder." Any one of these pictures might be the work of a veteran director, so excellently have they all been assembled and worked out in detail. Always an earnest worker, Mr. Shaw has entered upon a new career with enthusiasm and determination that, together with his natural artistic gifts and suavity of manner, have made his success inevitable.

PLAY The Land Beyond the Sunset (1912) directed by Shaw; runtime 00:12:45.

The film-industry journal Motography also reported about Shaw's promotion, noting that at a special "photoplay dinner" held on September 7 for studio personnel at New York's Coney Island, he was introduced as a speaker at that event and as a "director of Edison films". Some of the additional films he directed during the remainder of 1912 include A Question of Seconds, A Fresh Air Romance, A Romance of the Rails, The Governor, Hearts and Diamonds, The Grandfather, Mary in Stage Land, The Girl from the Country, and The Crime of Carelessness. However, Shaw's most acclaimed directorial work from that period is The Land Beyond the Sunset, a "'social conscience"' film released by Edison in October 1912. The film presents the tragic contemporary tale of a New York newsboy, who lives in dire poverty with his abusive grandmother and ends with the boy drifting out to sea in a small boat, desperately searching and likely dying in a doomed attempt to find a better, more humane life beyond the horizon. In recognition of the motion picture's importance to the United States' motion picture heritage, the Library of Congress in December 2000 selected The Land Beyond the Sunset for addition to the National Film Registry, a collection of films that are deemed "'culturally, historically, or aesthetically significant'".

Shaw finally left Edison in January 1913—after the release of At Bear Track Gulch—to direct The Wizard of the Jungle, filmed on location "in the wilds of the Florida jungleland" for the World's Best Film Company. He then completed screen projects for Independent Moving Pictures, a New York City studio most often referred to in trade publications and in general conversations within the film industry by its acronym, "Imp". During the early months of 1913, he directed The Old Melody and The Cub for that studio. Regarding the latter, the film critic for the trade journal The Moving Picture World described the production as "a brisk, modern newspaper story, written and produced [directed] by Harold Shaw", adding that the IMP release was a "good offering".

=== Working in England, 1913–1915 ===
Having gained significant production experience managing his own theatre company and then acting in and directing screen projects for Edison and IMP, Shaw accepted an offer in May 1913 to proceed immediately to England to be "director-in-chief" for the newly established London Film Company, which was in the final stages of completing Twickenham Studios, its large production facilities in the London suburb of St. Margarets. (Note: During the early silent era, the terms "director" and "producer" were often used interchangeably at studios and in many news items and promotions in film-industry publications. The jobs had not yet evolved into distinctly different positions in motion-picture productions.) His first film completed there is The House of Temperley (1913), a drama produced in collaboration with Arthur Conan Doyle, the author of Rodney Stone, the 1896 novel on which the motion picture is based. In fact, that adaptation directed by Shaw was the first feature released by the London Film Company as well as the first picture completed at Twickenham. The House of Temperley proved to be a commercial success in both Britain and overseas markets, prompting the London studio to assign Shaw to direct more than 30 additional projects for the company between 1913 and 1915.

After the outbreak of World War I in late July 1914, Shaw was described as an enthusiastic, "firm supporter" of the Allied cause during the conflict. He immediately volunteered for the Canadian army to support the British empire but was turned down for service. Despite that rejection, Shaw at London Films began writing and directing additional screen projects, many with stirring "military-patriotic" themes as well as short dramas with scenarios about "German spies and intrigues". One of his widely distributed and most effective wartime releases is You!, a military-recruitment drama released in January 1916. Commissioned by the Parliamentary Recruitment Committee, it is considered to be one of the most significant World War I propaganda films by British film historians. Those war-related, propaganda projects appear to have created personal links and associations with officials in the United Kingdom's Foreign Office. Over the next two years, Shaw also continued to direct comedies and romance dramas aimed at general audiences. Many of those films included his future wife, American actress Edna Flugrath, who by 1915 had become a popular lead with British theatergoers for her performances in an array of Shaw-directed productions, a few examples being The Ring and the Rajah (1914), England's Menace (1914), Liberty Hall (1914), The Heart of a Child (1915), and The Derby Winner (1915).

=== South Africa, 1916–1919 ===
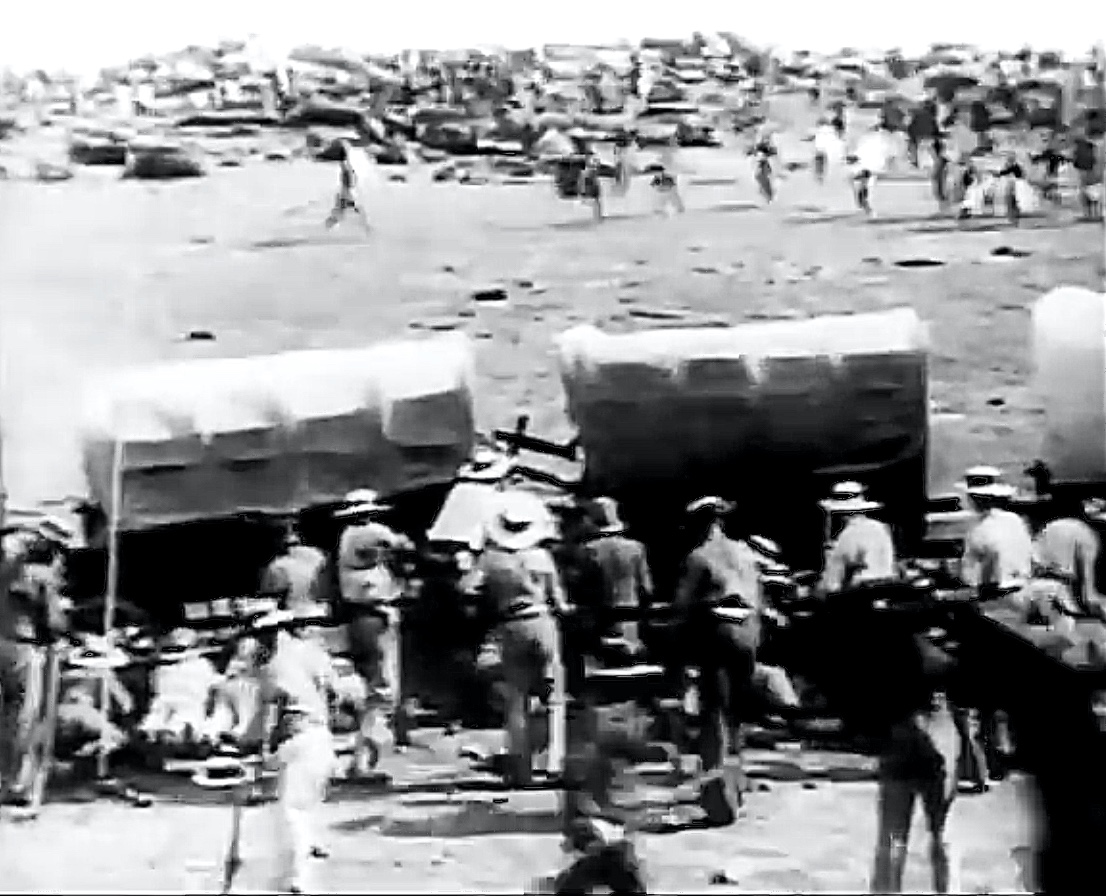
De Voortrekkers (1916) includes battle scenes with several thousand extras costumed as Zulu warriors and as heavily armed Dutch settlers. (Note: The cited number of extras who re-enacted the Battle of Blood River vary significantly in period trade publications and in later sources, with numbers ranging as high as 10,000 costumed performers. The true total of extras was likely far less than that figure. In an interview published in the December 18, 1920 issue of the London-based film journal Picture Show, Edna Flugrath Shaw describes some of her many "adventures" while working on location as an actor. She states that during the filming of De Voortrekkers "Five thousand natives of Africa were taking part and five hundred Dutch." She also states that 137 black extras were injured during the filming of battle sequences. The specific number she cites for injuries and the fact she was present at the filming indicate that she had detailed knowledge of her husband's overall casting for the production, a knowledge that enhances her credibility for the numbers she cites.)

In May 1916–with the approval if not the encouragement of Foreign Office officials in London—Shaw moved to South Africa after accepting a job offer from African Film Productions (AFP) to be that company's "chief producer-director". Central to that assignment was for Shaw to direct De Voortrekkers, a planned historical epic to be filmed in KwaZulu-Natal. The project proposed to portray from the perspective of that region's white minority the "Great Trek" made by Dutch-speaking Voortrekkers or "pioneers" in the 1830s, a time when South Africa was a colony of Great Britain. AFP and other backers of the film envisioned a production of "Griffith-like scale" that hoped "to capture white Afrikaner (Boer) patriotic pride and to earn possible super-profits from export overseas." The film ultimately completed by Shaw later in 1916 features in its extensive cast Dick Cruikshanks, Percy Marmont, and Edna Flugrath and includes an elaborate recreation of the Battle of Blood River of 1838, when a few hundred armed Dutch-speaking Boers defeated thousands of Zulu warriors.

According to Flugrath, who married Harold Shaw a month after the film's release, location work on De Voortrekkers took its toll on the cast and crew, especially on the director and on scores of native African extras injured during the battle re-enactment. Simulated fights between black and white performers during filming quickly escalated to genuine, near deadly off-camera altercations after some of the extras portraying the Dutch settlers "secretly filled their guns with pebbles" instead of firing empty barrels at their Zulu counterparts. The situation quickly "got out of hand", recalled Flugrath, with one Zulu extra getting so enraged after being wounded by pebbles that he "threw his assegai [spear] at Mr. Shaw", which only missed him "by a few inches." "It was a miracle", she added, "that he was not killed."

De Voortrekkers premiered in South Africa on December 16, 1916 for "Dingaan's Day" celebrations at Krugersdorp, marking at the time the 78th anniversary of the battle. The screen drama then circulated to major cities, where it proved to be extremely popular with white audiences. By March 1917, even American trade papers were reporting that Shaw's "Boer film" in Pretoria was "drawing big houses". The original print distributed to South African cinemas reportedly had a runtime of "some two hours", although much shorter versions of the picture were later presented in foreign markets. (Note: A shorter version of the original South African film De Voortrekkers, one retitled Winning a Continent, was later presented in England, but not generally distributed to theaters in the United States until December 1924.)

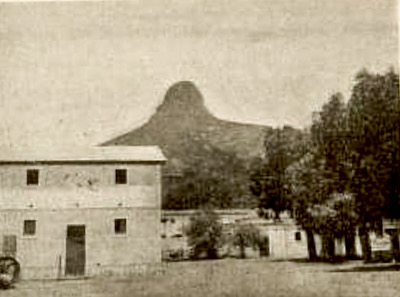
Studio buildings of Harold Shaw Films Productions near Cape Town, South Africa, 1918

After the release of De Voortrekkers and the end of his association with AFP, Shaw in late January 1917 embarked on an extended international journey, leaving South Africa and traveling for months to India, Ceylon, the Far East, Egypt, and to other destinations. The tour, conducted for both business-related reasons and as a honeymoon trip after marrying Edna Flugrath, consumed most of the year, but Shaw returned to South Africa near the end of 1917. At that time, he decided to establish his own motion picture company there, selecting Sea Point, a suburb of Cape Town, as the site to build his production facilities. The company's first studio building, which was constructed around a renovated "abandoned carbarn", was surrounded by attractive seascapes and landscapes that provided Shaw a wide assortment of convenient filming locations, ranging from Table Bay with its broad stretches of beach to diverse higher elevations distinguished by Lion's Head Mountain. In March 1918, the widely read American trade paper Variety reported a few details about the new studio's principal employees:

Harold Shaw, who some time ago came out as producer for African Films Trust, has severed his connection and has formed a company under the title Harold Shaw Films Productions, Ltd., with headquarters in Capetown. The company comprises Harold Shaw, director; Ralph Kimpton, assistant director; Henry Howes, cameraman; Ernest Palmer, cameraman; Edna Flugarth [sic], leading.

Under the administration of his new company, Shaw completed two more releases before leaving South Africa and returning to England: The Rose of Rhodesia in 1918, the first production filmed at Sea Point, and the comedy Thoroughbreds All in 1919.

=== Later films in England, 1920–1922 ===
Shaw returned to London in the final weeks of 1919 after closing his studio facilities in Cape Town. Once re-established in the English capital, he initially worked on a few pictures for the financially struggling London Film Company, which finally ceased operations late in 1920. Soon, though, the experienced filmmaker accepted a commission offered by Basil Thomson, the chief of intelligence for Britain's Home Office, to direct a proposed production, one with a storyline set within the ongoing civil war in Russia between Bolshevik forces and anti-communists. The film, titled The Land of Mystery, was to be shot on location in and around Kovno (now known as Kaunas), Lithuania, and intended in part to present a thinly veiled, unflattering portrayal of the Russian revolutionary Vladimir Lenin. With Shaw's wife Edna Flugrath and English actor Norman Tharp in co-starring roles, the project proved to be a grueling experience for cast and crew while traveling and filming for weeks in the late-winter conditions of far-off Lithuania. Tharp, who closely resembled Lenin, portrayed in the production the dissolute character "Lenoff", who falls desperately in love with a ballerina (Flugrath), becomes a ruthless Bolshevik revolutionary, and ultimately commits suicide when she elopes with a Russian prince.

On both sides of the Atlantic, film-industry publications periodically reported on Shaw's progress on the "anti-Bolshevik film". Variety in the United States, in its March 26, 1920 issue, updates its readers:

Harold Shaw is on his way to Poland with a company of British artists to make a picture with a Bolshevist setting. The interior work was completed in the "London" studios last week. A mysterious gentleman, Boris Said, is apparently behind the venture.

The Land of Mystery was released in the United Kingdom in July 1920 and was presented "week after week" in London and elsewhere in England. Despite the film's commercial success, the logistical challenges of shooting the drama in Lithuania and the ensuing political controversies connected to the British government's association with its production may have influenced Shaw's decision to accept an offer in the fall of 1920 from Stoll Pictures in London to join its staff of directors. Stoll at the time was the largest motion-picture studio in England, employing over 1000 people at its operations in Cricklewood, where the company had a sprawling complex of buildings formerly used by an aircraft factory that had closed after World War I.

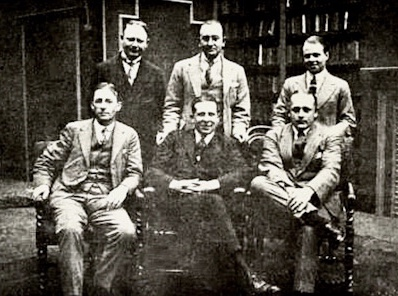
Stoll's directors (Shaw standing, left) with the studio's managing director Jeffrey Bernerd (sitting, center), late 1920

For two years, Shaw directed a series of dramas and comedies at Stoll. His first for the studio is Kipps (1921), an adaptation of H. G. Wells' 1905 novel. During that film's production, Motion Picture News reported that Shaw went on location for one day to the prestigious Savoy Hotel in central London and "took over the lounge and grill room" of the building to shoot scenes. It was further reported that H. G. Wells himself was present at that filming, which occurred during the hotel's less-congested hours between "midnight until seven in the morning". Kipps was another critical and commercial success for Shaw, who completed at Cricklewood and on location in various English counties at least six more films for Stoll: The Woman of His Dream (1921); A Dear Fool (1921); General John Regan (1921); False Evidence (1922); The Wheels of Chance (1922), another adaptation of a work by Wells; and Love and a Whirlwind (1922).

=== Return to the United States and final films, 1922–1925 ===
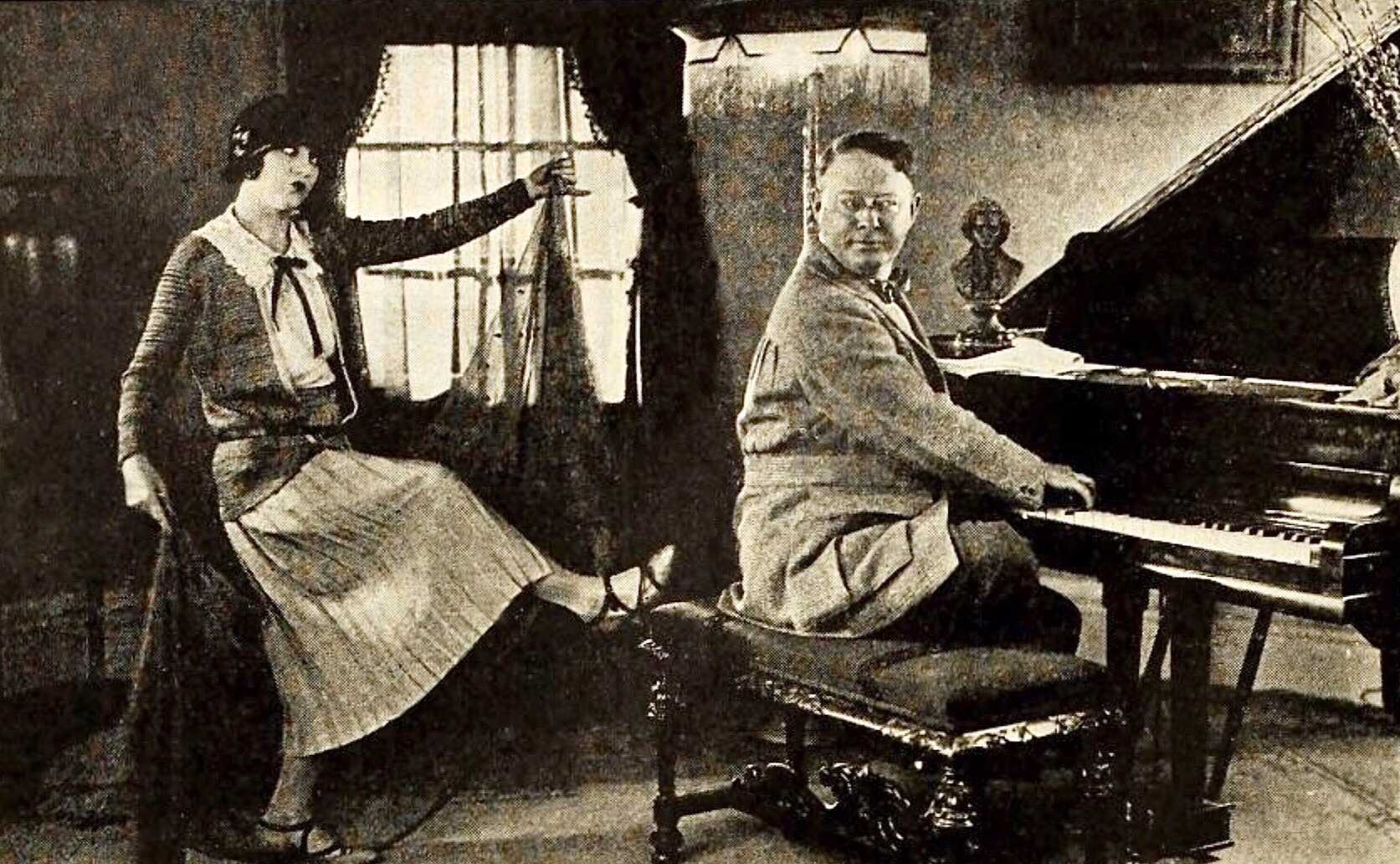
Shaw at piano rehearsing with Viola Dana for Rouged Lips (1923)

Shaw and Flugrath returned to the United States in 1922, arriving at Ellis Island in September, over two months before the release in London of Harold's final film for Stoll, Love and a Whirlwind. (Note: Trade publications in the fall of 1922 reported that among the chief reasons Shaw returned to the United States after a decade working overseas was that Edna's mother, Mary (née Gauch) Flugrath, was sick and was rapidly declining in health. According to the "California Death Index, 1905-1939" in California's Department of Health Services, Mrs. Flugrath died on 30 November 1922 in a private sanatorium in Los Angeles.) Soon, the couple left New York and resettled in California, in Los Angeles, where by the summer of 1923 Shaw began directing screen projects for Metro Pictures. His first one for that studio is Rouged Lips and stars his sister-in-law Viola Dana. The silent romantic comedy was well received by both critics and audiences, with the Chicago-based reviewing service Screen Opinions judging the production to be "neatly directed" and its content "clean, full of ginger".

Two other releases that the director completed for Metro are the 1923 drama Held to Answer, currently considered lost, and the 1924 drama A Fool's Awakening. The casting of A Fool's Awakening prompted the entertainment media and the Los Angeles film community to observe how Shaw's years of experience residing and working in England influenced his selection of performers. In its January 5, 1924 issue, the trade journal Moving Picture World in a news item headed "English Types in Films" stated, "Aristocratic appearing Britons have been at a premium in Hollywood ever since Harold Shaw began the direction of 'The [sic] Fool's Awakening'", adding "More than three hundred and fifty persons, each bearing the unmistakable stamp of British aristocracy, appeared in one of the great scenes."

In addition to directing and planning future film projects in Hollywood, Shaw became increasingly active in local and national professional organizations, especially in the Motion Picture Directors Association (MPDA). He was elected secretary of the association in October 1925, just a few months before his untimely death. (Note: The Motion Picture Directors Association was established in Los Angeles in 1915, and the next year association members in California helped fellow directors working in New York City to form their own eastern branch of MPDA, which was incorporated there in January 1917. When Shaw died he was serving as secretary of the Hollywood or western branch of the association, the senior and more prestigious division of MPDA.)

== Personal life ==
Shaw married twice. On October 29, 1900, he wed 22-year-old Myrtle Chapman in Wilmington, Delaware at the parsonage of Minister C. A. Grise. Their marriage ended by divorce before April 4, 1910, when Myrtle married again in New York City. Seven years later, Shaw also remarried, then to actress Edna Flugrath. During his time working at Edison Studios, he met Flugrath, who was a native of Brooklyn, New York and a contract player with the studio. The couple, not yet married, were separated in 1913 when Shaw left the United States to direct films in London, but Flugrath followed him overseas the next year after her own contract with Edison expired. She worked as a lead as well as a support player in many productions that Shaw directed in England and later in South Africa, where they married. On January 5, 1917—three weeks after the release of De Voortrekkers—the couple wed in Johannesburg. They then departed on an extended trip to India, Ceylon, China, Japan, Siam, Egypt, and England for the dual purposes of honeymooning and, as cited in their passport applications, for conducting "Moving picture business" at all those destinations. The two remained together until Harold's death nine years later. Edna survived him by 40 years, dying in San Diego, California in April 1966. The couple had no children.

== Death ==
On January 30, 1926, Shaw died in an automobile accident in Los Angeles, where the car in which he was a passenger collided with another vehicle at the intersection of Sixth Street and Rossmore Avenue. Contemporary reports of the crash state that one of Shaw's friends, who was driving the vehicle, was thrown clear by the impact and survived with only minor cuts and bruises. Shaw, however, was "buried underneath the car" when it overturned, and according to the findings of an inquest, he had died instantly in the wreck due to massive head trauma. Unfortunately, despite Harold M. Shaw's lengthy stage and film career, which spanned a full 30 years, he was still misidentified as "G. Harold Shaw" in the obituary that Variety published four days after his death. His years of association with film productions in London also led the New York trade paper in that same obituary to refer to the Tennessee-born director as "a native of England", and Variety also incorrectly cited his age as 38 instead of 48.

A memorial service for Shaw was conducted in Hollywood "at the undertaker parlors of Strother & Dayton" on February 3, 1926 by members of the "233 Club", the local Masonic Temple. Since returning to California in 1923, the director had become active in not only professional organizations such as MPDA but also in the 233 Club, which was founded in Los Angeles in 1924 and required that every one of its members be "'a motion picture worker in any capacity'". Following the club's memorial service, Shaw's body was cremated and his final remains were enshrined at Hollywood Forever Cemetery.

Months after Shaw's death, in the June 1926 issue of Photoplay magazine, staff writer Dorothy Spensley reflects on the tragic irony of the director's accidental, rather mundane death after all of the dangerous adventures he and his wife had experienced during their film careers:

Nothing could happen to Edna and Harold. They had braved the perils of German air-raids in London, had hob-nobbed with the Bolsheviks in Russia, had stolen bread from the Germans in revolt in Berlin to sustain life, had worked and sweltered beneath the South African sun to bring, triumphant, from the veldt a film of the winning of the continent...There had been many, many hazardous undertakings by Harold Shaw and Edna Flugarth Shaw....Then one morning about four months ago, a newsboy shouting: "'Extra! Film Director Dies in Auto Accident!'" In that raucous voice that only a newsboy has...Harold Shaw of those perilous expeditions felled...Edna a widow."

== Selected filmography ==
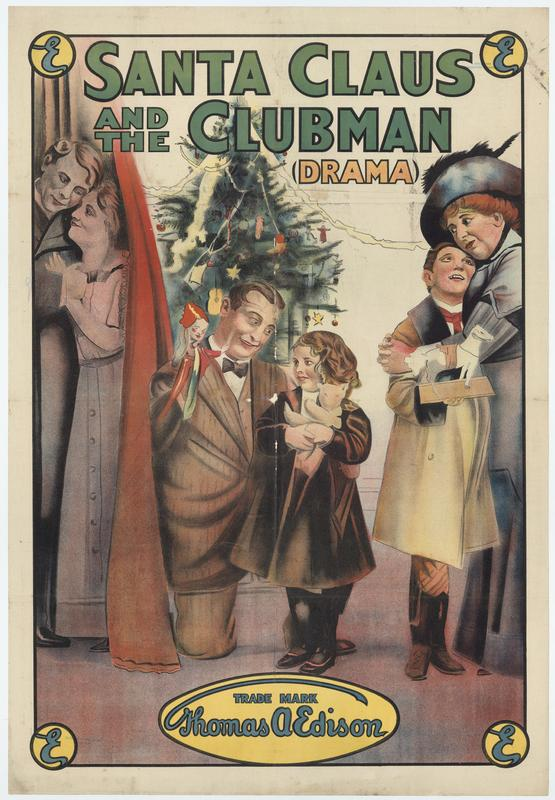
The theater poster for Edison's 1911 Christmas drama in which Shaw starred as "The Clubman"

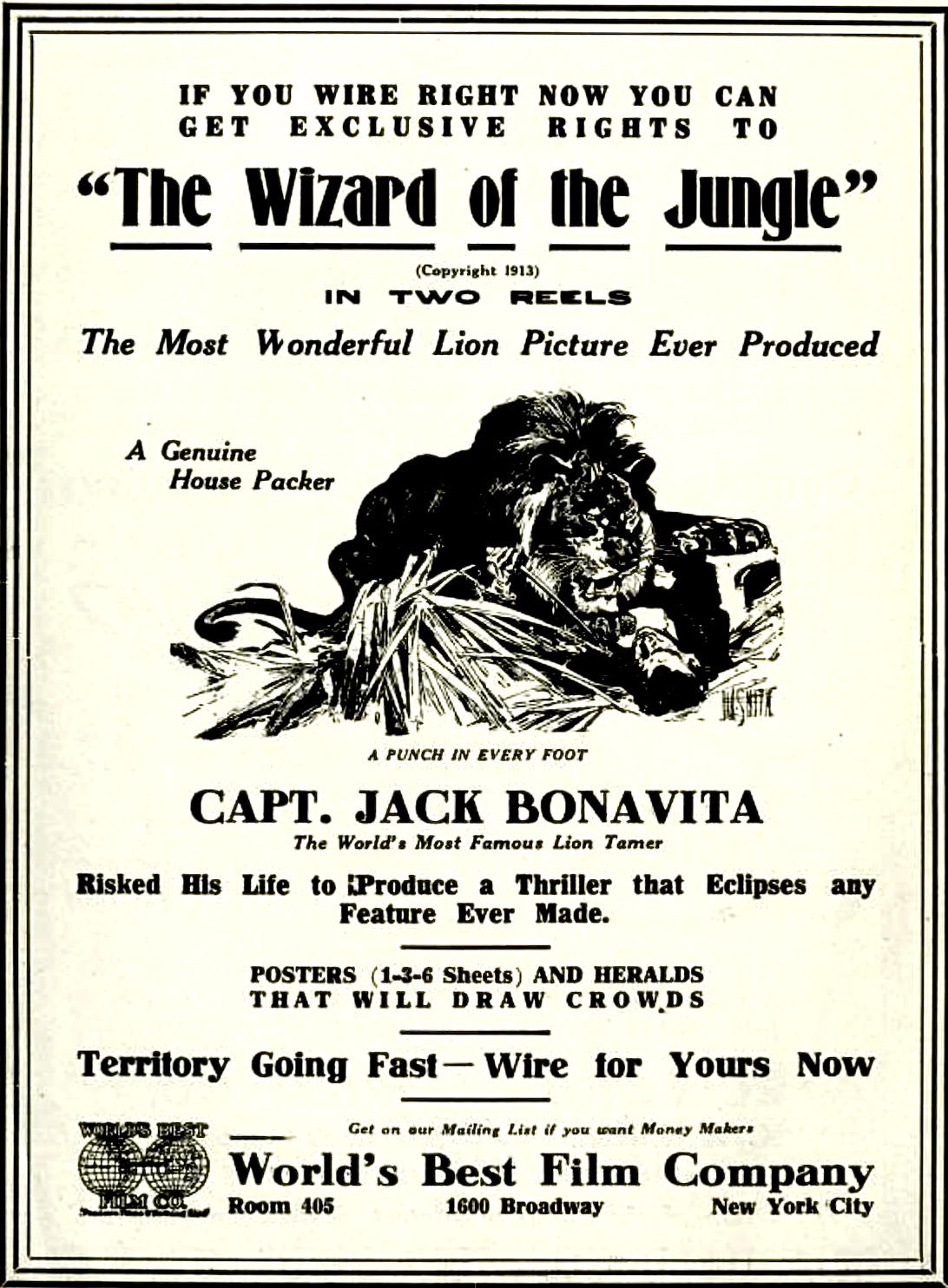
The Wizard of the Jungle (1913) directed by Shaw for World's Best Film Company

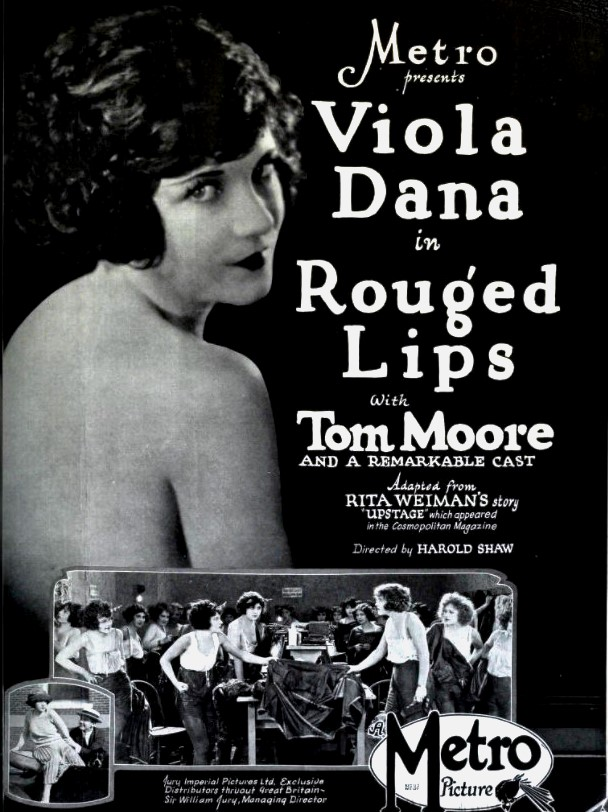
Metro promotion of Shaw's film Rouged Lips (1923)

- The Attack on the Mill (1910)
- The Child and the Tramp (1911)
- Bob and Rowdy (1911)
- The Modern Dianas (1911)
- The Three Musketeers (1911)
- The Big Dam (1911)
- Mary's Masquerade (1911)
- The Death of Nathan Hale (1911)
- Foul Play (1911)
- Her Wedding Ring (1911)
- A Conspiracy Against the King (1911)
- The Kid From the Klondike (1911)
- The Reform Candidate (1911)
- The Black Arrow (1911)
- Home, A Thanksgiving Story
- The Lure of the City (1911)
- The Awakening of John Bond (1911)
- Santa Claus and the Clubman (1911)
- Freezing Auntie (1912)
- The Jewels (1912)
- Mother and Daughters (1912)
- Thirty Days at Hard Labor (1912)
- A Question of Seconds (1912)
- The Corsican Brothers (1912)
- The Bachelor's Waterloo (1912)
- Martin Chuzzlewit (1912)
- The Convict's Parole (1912)
- The Man Who Made Good (1912)
- The Bank President's Son (1912)
- Hearts and Diamonds (1912)
- The Grandfather (1912)
- Mary in Stage Land (1912)
- The Girl from the Country (1912)
- A Fresh Air Romance (1912)
- Helping John (1912)
- The Land Beyond the Sunset (1912)
- The Old Reporter (1912)
- The Third Thanksgiving (1912)
- On Donovan's Division (1912)
- A Christmas Accident (1912)
- The Crime of Carelessness (1912)
- The Wizard of the Jungle (1913)
- The Old Melody (1913)
- The House of Temperley (1913)
- Lawyer Quince (1914)
- Liberty Hall (1914)
- The Ring and the Rajah (1914)
- Clancarty (1914)
- Child o' My Heart (1914)
- England's Menace (1914)
- Trilby (1914)
- Two Little Ambitions (1914)
- For Home and Country (1914)
- The King's Minister (1914)
- Two Little Britons (1914)
- The Victoria Cross (1914)
- A Christmas Carol (1914)
- Brother Officers (1915)
- The Ashes of Revenge (1915)
- The Heart of a Child (1915)
- The Derby Winner (1915)
- The Third Generation (1915)
- Mr. Lyndon at Liberty (1915)
- The Heart of Sister Ann (1915
- The Firm of Girdlestone (1915)
- Me and Me Moke (1916)
- Me and M'Pal (1916)
- You! (1916)
- The Last Challenge (1916)
- De Voortrekkers (1916)
- Die Rose von Rhodesia (1918)
- Thoroughbreds All
- The Land of Mystery (1920)
- The Pursuit of Pamela (1920)
- True Tilda (1920)
- London Pride (1920)
- The Woman of His Dream (1921)
- Kipps (1921)
- A Dear Fool (1921)
- General John Regan (1921)
- False Evidence (1922)
- The Wheels of Chance (1922)
- Rouged Lips (1923)
- Held to Answer (1923)
- A Fool's Awakening (1924)
