= Edna Flugrath =

American actress (1892–1966)

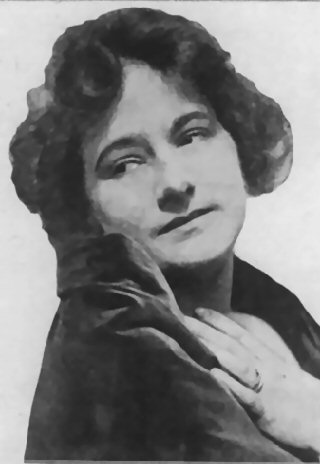
- Flugrath in 1920
- Born: Edna Marie Flugrath; December 29, 1892; Brooklyn, New York, U.S.
- Died: April 6, 1966 (aged 73); San Diego, California, U.S.
- Resting place: Hollywood Forever Cemetery
- Occupation: Actress
- Years active: 1912–1923
- Spouse: Harold M. Shaw
- Relatives: Viola Dana (sister); Shirley Mason (sister)

Edna Marie Flugrath (December 29, 1892 – April 6, 1966) was the eldest of three sisters who found fame as silent film stars.

== Early life ==
Flugrath was the first born of Emil and Mary (née Dubois) Flugrath. Her father, a printer by trade, was the son of Polish-German immigrants and had at one time been considered a talented amateur athlete. Mary Dubois was born in New York. Some years later when their daughters were working on films, the Flugraths moved to the West Coast where they became popular on movie sets conversing with curious Hollywood tourists. Mary Flugrath died in Los Angeles in 1922 at the age of 55. Her husband died there 20 years later, aged 74.

== Career ==
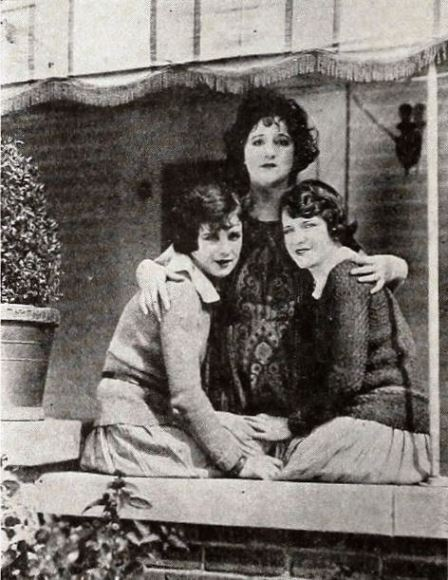
Flugath with her sisters Viola Dana and Shirley Mason in 1923.

Flugrath began working on stage at a very early age appearing in vaudeville shows, legitimate theater and ballet. Before she had turned 20, she had tired of the road and decided to try her hand working in the fledgling film industry. She began as a stock player with The Edison Film Company and eventually was given starring roles in one or two reel productions that were common for that period.

At some point during her time with Edison she became involved with director Harold Marvin Shaw and later followed him to England after her contract with Edison had expired. Flugrath achieved some success as a leading lady working with Shaw in England but left acting after they married in Johannesburg, South Africa, while filming De Voortrekkers (1916). Three years later she attempted a comeback working on a few films for the London Film Company and Stoll Pictures before returning to America where she found it difficult to get work.

== Later life ==
Eventually Flugrath gave up on acting and opened a beauty salon in Hollywood. Her husband later became secretary for the Motion Picture Directors’ Association. On January 30, 1926, while driving in Los Angeles, Harold Marvin Shaw was killed instantly in a head-on collision. He was 48 years old and a native of Tennessee. All three of the Flugrath sisters married motion picture directors, Shaw, Bernard Durning and John Collins, who all died prematurely. Sometime around 1930 Flugrath married Halliburton (or Haliberton) Houghton, a broker from Dallas, Texas. In the years to follow, Flugrath became estranged from her sisters Leonie (Shirley Mason) and Virginia (Viola Dana), a rift that lasted until the end of her life.

== Death ==
Flugrath died in San Diego in 1966, seven years after her husband's passing. Her sisters did not immediately learn of her death until notified by a stranger (most likely a reporter).

== Selected filmography ==
- What Happened to Mary (1912) (short)
- The Dam Builder (1912) (short)
- Hearts and Diamonds (1912) (short)
- Like Knights of Old (1912) (short)
- The Third Thanksgiving (1912) (short)
- On Donovan's Division (1912) (short)
- Annie Crawls Upstairs (1912) (short)
- A Proposal Under Difficulties (1912) (short)
- The Photograph and the Blotter (1913) (short)
- Turtle Doves (1914) (short)
- Lil o' London (1914) (short)
- Liberty Hall (1914)
- The Ring and the Rajah (1914)
- The Ashes of Revenge (1915)
- A Garrett in Bohemia (1915) (short)
- The Derby Winner (1915)
- The Third Generation (1915)
- Mr. Lyndon at Liberty (1915)
- The Heart of Sister Ann (1915)
- The Firm of Girdlestone (1915)
- Me and Me Moke (1916)
- The Man Without a Soul (1916)
- De Voortrekkers (1916)
- The Two Roads (1916)
- True Tilda (1920)
- The Pursuit of Pamela (1920)
- London Pride (1920)
- The Land of Mystery (1920)
- Kipps (1921)
- A Case of Identity (1921) (short)
- A Dear Fool (1921)
- False Evidence (1922)
- The Social Code (1923, lost film)
