= Connecticut State Library =

State Library in the US State of Connecticut

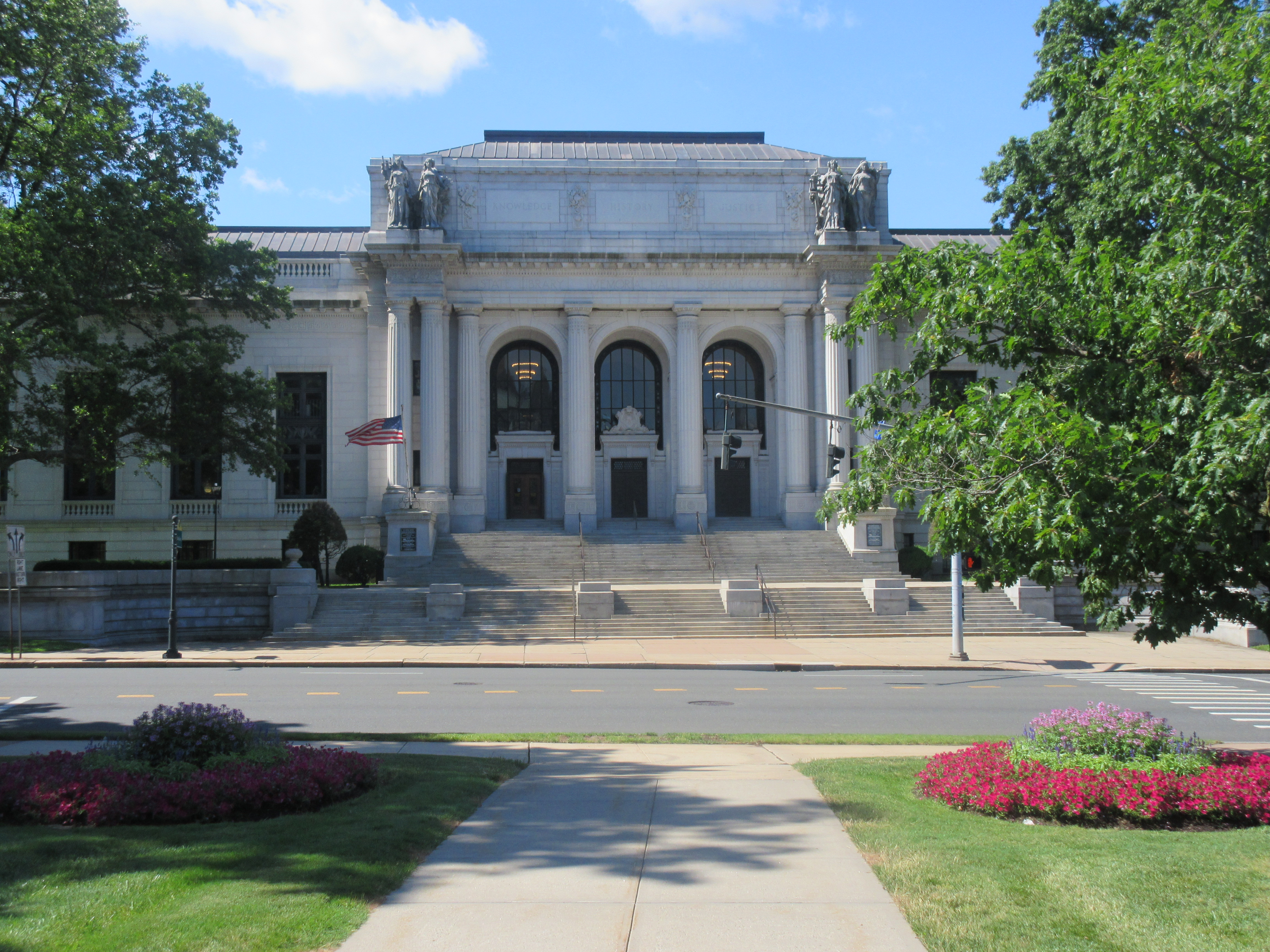
- Connecticut State Library & Supreme Court Building
- 41.762316°N 72.683143°W
- Location: 231 Capitol Avenue Hartford, CT 06106
- Established: 1854

Other information
- Director: Deborah Schander (2021–present)
- Website: www.ctstatelibrary.org

The Connecticut State Library is the state library for the U.S. state of Connecticut and is also an executive branch agency of the state. It is located in Hartford, Connecticut directly across the street from the Connecticut State Capitol. The State Library provides a variety of library, information, archival, public records, museum, and administrative services to the citizens of Connecticut, as well as the employees and officials of all three branches of state government. Students, researchers, public libraries and town governments throughout the state are also served by the State Library. In addition, the State Library directs a program of statewide library development and administers the Library Services Technology Act state grant. "The mission of the Connecticut State Library is to preserve and make accessible Connecticut's history and heritage and to advance the development of library services statewide."

== History ==
The Connecticut State Library was established by an act of the Connecticut General Assembly in May 1854. James Hammond Trumbull was appointed the first State Librarian. There have been only eleven State Librarians. The collections were first kept in the State Houses in Hartford and New Haven and then in the present day Capitol. In 1910 they were relocated to the State Library and Supreme Court building in Hartford where they are housed today.

=== State librarians ===
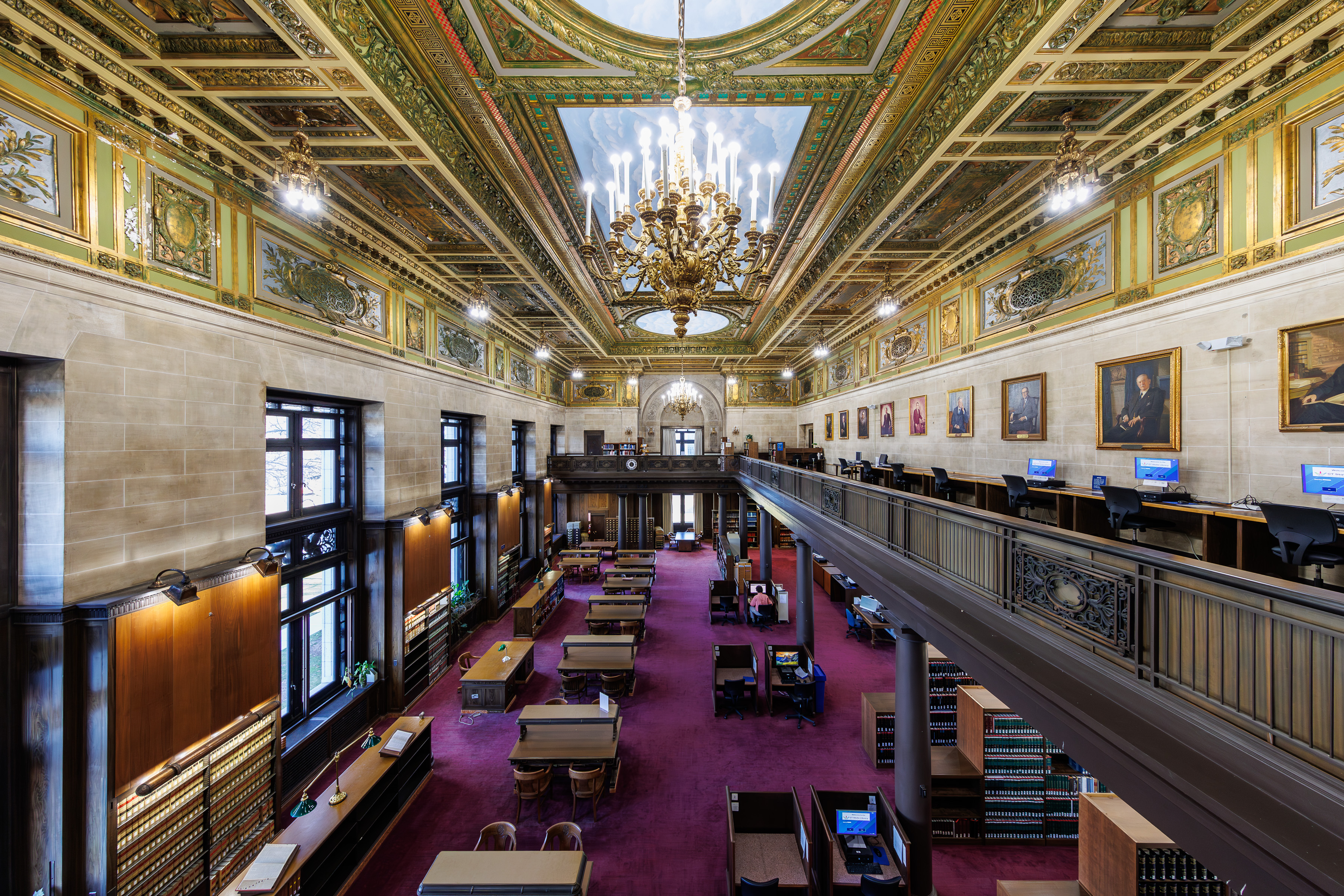
State Library interior

- James H. Trumbull (1854)
- Charles J. Hoadly (1855–1900)
- George S. Godard (1900–1936)
- James Brewster (1936–1956)
- Robert C. Sale (1957–1963)
- Walter Brahm (1964–1975)
- Charles E. Funk Jr. (1975–1979)
- Clarence R. Walters (1980–1986)
- Richard G. Akeroyd (1986–1997)
- Kendall F. Wiggin (1998–2019)
- Deborah Schander (2021–present)

== Governance ==
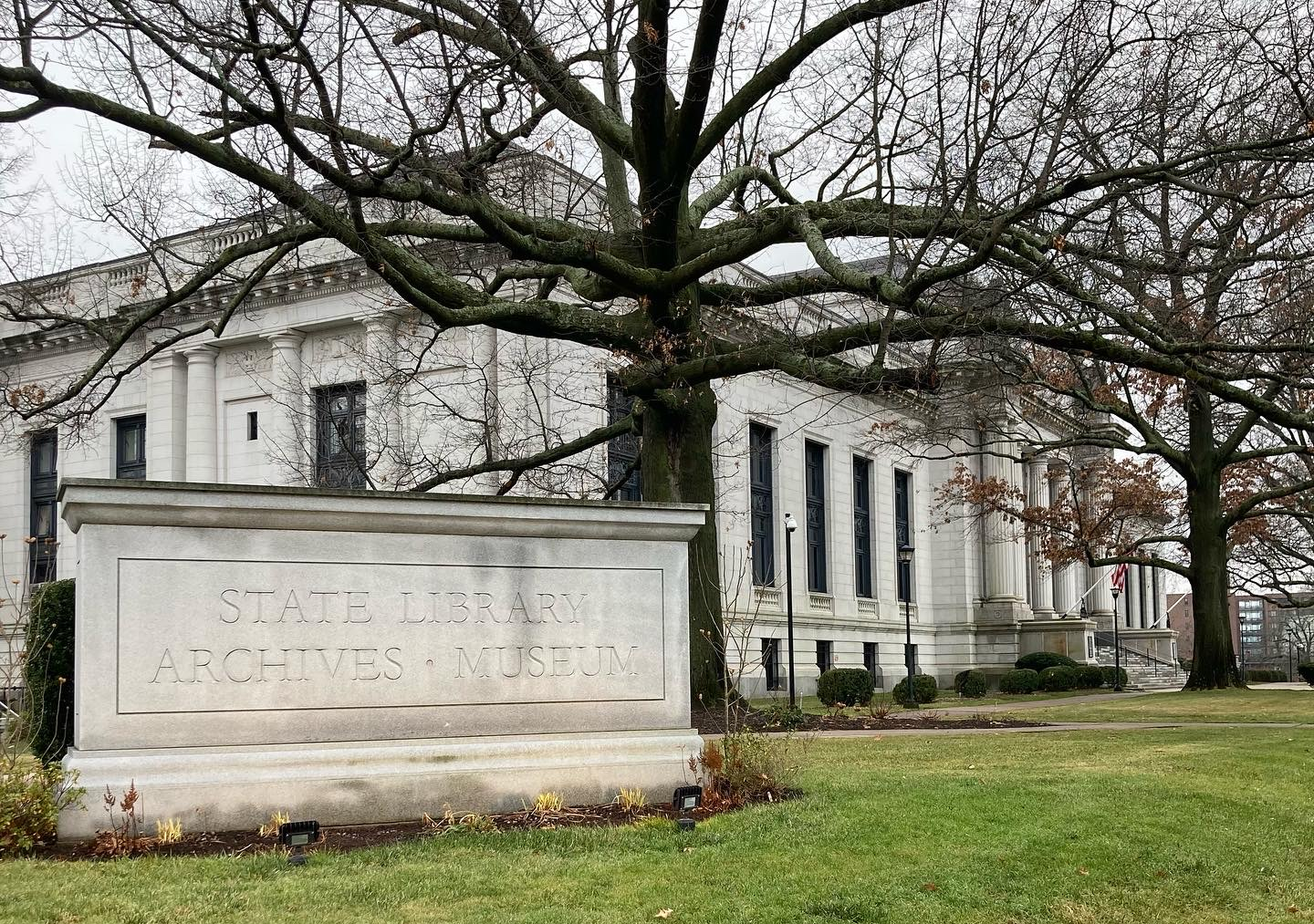
Capitol Avenue sign

The Connecticut State Library is an Executive Branch agency of the State of Connecticut. The State Library Board determines policy for the State Library and provides for the supervision of the State Library by a State Librarian appointed by the Board. The State Library Board is within the Department of Education for administrative purposes only.

The State Library Board consists of:

- Chief Justice of the Supreme Court or designee
- Chief Court Administrator or designee
- Commissioner of Education or designee
- Five members who are appointed by the Governor, one of whom shall be an experienced librarian, one of whom shall be an experienced archivist and one of whom shall be an experienced museum professional
- One member each appointed by the president pro tempore of the Senate, the minority leader of the Senate, the Speaker of the House of Representatives and the minority leader of the House

The terms of appointed members are coterminous with the term of their appointing authority. The State Librarian, who serves as the chief administrative officer of the Board, is appointed by the Board.

=== Statutory charge and responsibilities ===
Section 11-1 of the Connecticut General Statutes assigns to the Board the responsibility for:

- the supervision of the State Library by a State Librarian
- planning for statewide library service, other than for school libraries
- maximum state participation in federal aid for public libraries
- establishing standards for principal public libraries
- appointing an advisory council for library planning and development
- instituting and conducting programs of statewide library service
- maintaining the state's principal law library
- maintaining a library service for the blind and other persons with disabilities
- planning and developing the Connecticut Library Network
- making construction grants to public libraries
- creating and maintaining the official state archives
- programs for library development and reader services
- operating the Raymond E. Baldwin Museum of Connecticut History and Heritage

Under the direction of the State Library Board, the State Librarian is responsible for developing and directing a public records management program.

The State Library Board approves rules and regulations for the state publication depository library system; the retention, destruction, and transfer of documents; the "borrowIT CT" (formerly known as Connecticard) program; and statewide library programs.

== Areas of service ==
=== Library services to patrons ===
- The Connecticut State Archives has acquired historical records from the three branches of Connecticut government since 1855. The Archives contains more than 32,000 cubic feet (910 m^{3}) of records documenting the evolution of state public policy and its implementation, the rights and claims of citizens, and the history of Connecticut and its people.
- Digital Projects, the State Library preserves and provides online access to digitized historical items from the State Library, Museum, and State Archives collections, as well as born-digital government publications.
- Government Information, the State Library is a Regional Federal Depository Library as well as a Connecticut State Document Depository and has an extensive collection of government publications and supporting public policy materials.
- History and Genealogy, the State Library maintains a comprehensive collection to preserve and make accessible the records of Connecticut's history and heritage including genealogies, local histories, Connecticut newspapers, and vital, church, and probate records.
- Law and Legislation, the State Library serves as the principal law library for Connecticut state government and maintains a comprehensive collection of state and federal legal publications, and an archive of Connecticut General Assembly documents.
- The Library for the Blind and Physically Handicapped is a network member of the Library of Congress' National Library Service for the Blind and Physically Handicapped. They lend books and magazines in recorded format along with playback equipment and materials in Braille, free to any Connecticut adult or child who is unable to read regular print due to a visual or physical disability.
- The Office of the Public Records Administrator creates records retention schedules for state and local government and supervises the legal destruction of public records that have no permanent or historic value and have reached the end of their usefulness. This office also operates the State Records Center where state agencies can temporarily store their records.

=== Support for local libraries ===
The Division of Library Development administers many programs to support public libraries in the state:

- Grants to Public Libraries support public library services
- Public Library Construction Grants are available to improve public library facilities to meet communities' needs
- Library Services and Technology Act funds provide for statewide programs including the Library for the Blind and Physically Handicapped, training for library staff, and fund competitive grants to public, school, and academic libraries.
- Statistical Information is collected about Connecticut's public libraries, organized, and published to provide public libraries with data they need to plan and develop services for their communities.

=== Resource sharing ===
- researchIT CT is a free online resource service of the CT State Library. This service provides journal, magazine, and newspaper articles for Connecticut public, K12, and academic libraries and their users. This service also offers a collection of downloadable eAudios and eBooks for Connecticut residents with valid CT public library card numbers.
- borrowIT CT(formerly known as Connecticard) is a cooperative program among public libraries in Connecticut that allows a resident of any town in the state who holds a valid borrower card issued by their home library to use that card to borrow materials from any of the 192 public libraries participating in the program.

== Museum of Connecticut History ==
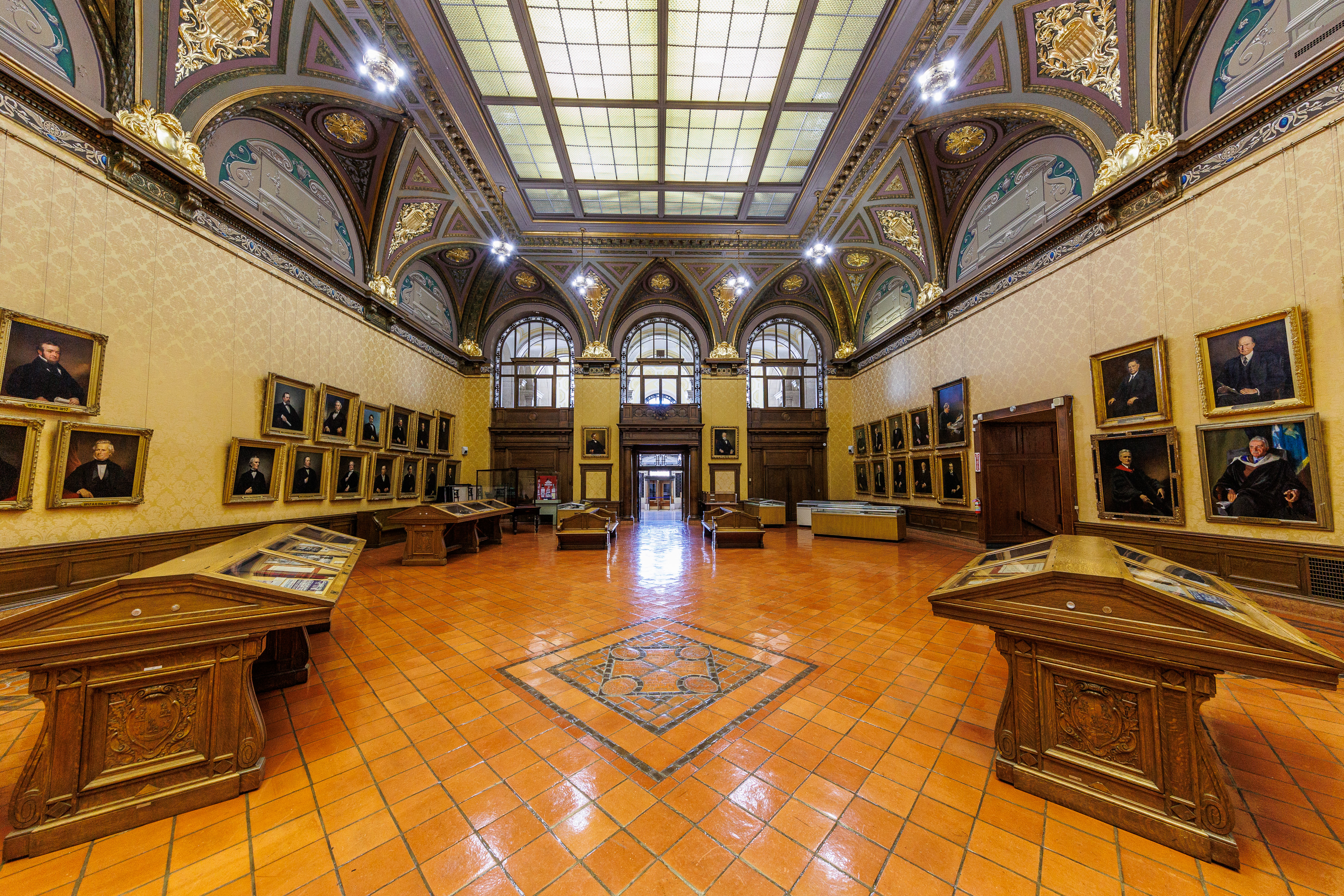
Museum of Connecticut History

The Museum of Connecticut History consists of Memorial Hall, a magnificently restored Beaux-Arts style gallery, and three adjoining exhibit areas. On permanent display are portraits of Connecticut Governors as well as historical documents, including the State's original 1662 Royal Charter, the 1639 Fundamental Orders, and the 1818 and 1964 State Constitutions. The focus of the Museum and its collections is Connecticut's government, military, and industrial history.

== Facilities ==
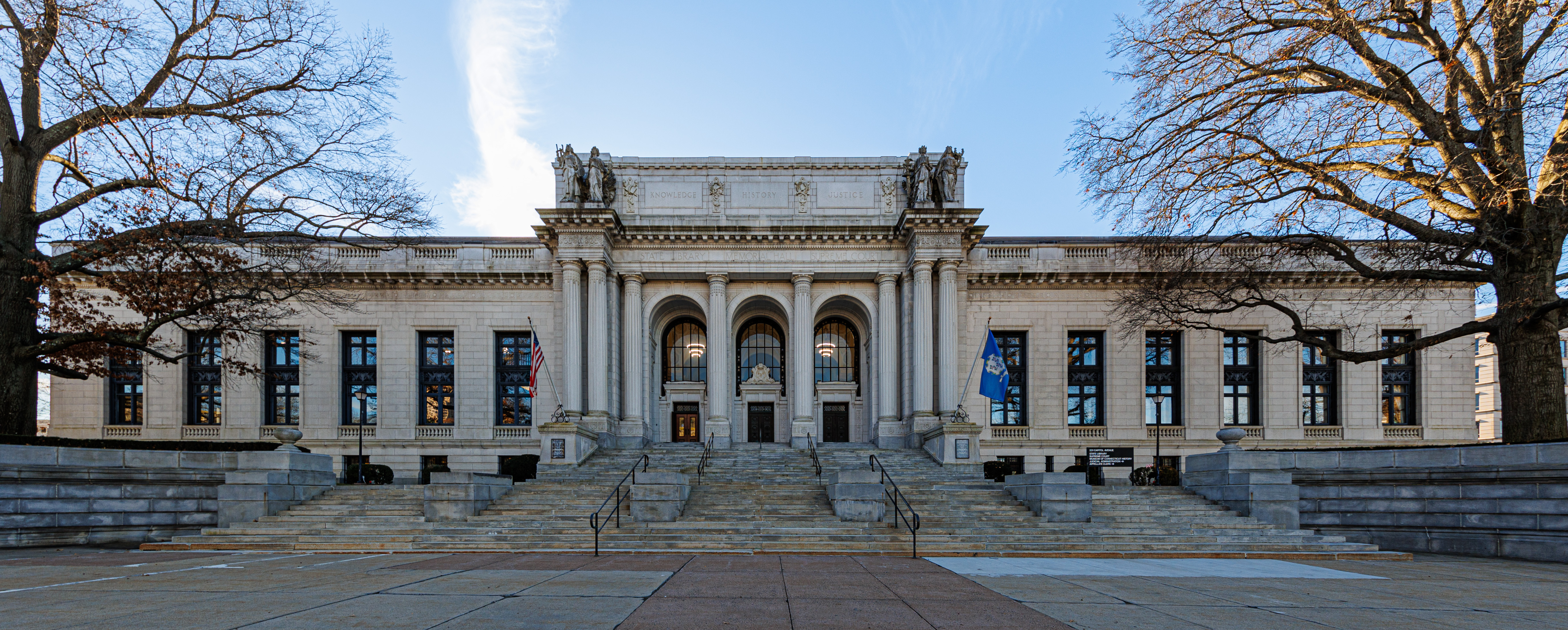
State Library and Supreme Court Building, Capitol Avenue façade

- State Library and Supreme Court Building, 231 Capitol Avenue, Hartford, Connecticut. Includes the Library, State Archives, and Museum of Connecticut History.
- Middletown Library Service Center, 786 South Main Street Middletown, Connecticut
- Library for the Blind and Physically Handicapped, 198 West Street Rocky Hill, Connecticut
- State Records Center, 198 West Street Rocky Hill, Connecticut
- State Library Storage Facility, 75 Van Block Avenue Hartford, Connecticut

== Architecture ==
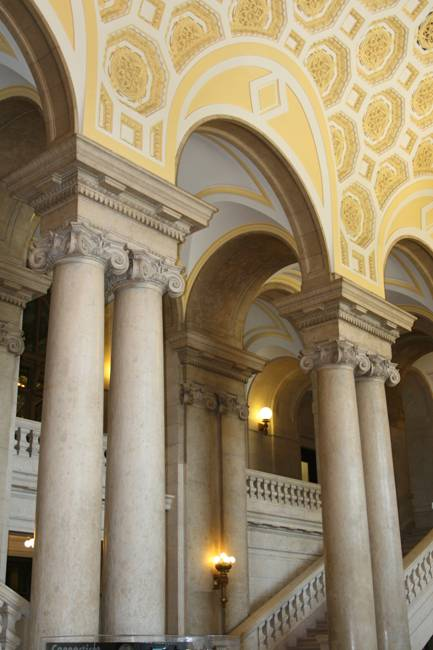
State Library Lobby. Courtesy of Patrick J. Smith

The groundbreaking ceremony for the Connecticut State Library and Supreme Court Building was held on July 29, 1908. Architects Donn Barber of New York and E. T. Hapgood of Hartford envisioned a design based on an adaptation of the Italian Renaissance style of architecture. The design includes three wings off a central lobby, the State Library on the left, Memorial Hall in the center and the Supreme Court on the right. Construction began on October 23, 1908, with Marc Eidlitz & Son of New York as the builder and general contractor. On November 28, 1910, State Librarian George Godard and his staff moved into the new building.

An addition to the East Wing in 1969 was designed by Architects Jeter & Cook. Bartlett-Brainard & Eacott, Inc. was the general contractor. The addition featured Museum exhibition space, an extensive stack area, and administrative office space.

The library building was listed on the National Register of Historic Places in 1981, recognizing both its architecture and its significance as a repository of state history.

== See also ==
- National Register of Historic Places listings in Hartford, Connecticut
- List of libraries in the United States
