= CMCH =

CMCH may refer to:

- Cape May Court House, New Jersey
- Connecticut Museum of Culture and History
- Chittagong Medical College Hospital
- Center on Media and Child Health at Boston's Children Hospital
