= Albert Bates (disambiguation) =

Albert Bates (born 1947) is influential figure in the intentional community and ecovillage movements.

Albert Bates may also refer to:

- Albert Bates (cricketer) (1867–1950), New Zealand cricketer
- Albert Bates (criminal) (1891–1948), American bank robber and burglar
- Albert Carlos Bates (1865–1954), American librarian, book collector, and historian
- Albert Edmund Bates (1862–1929), Australian architect
- Albie Bates (1941–2021), South African rugby union player and coach
