= Annie Eliot Trumbull =

American author (1857–1949)

- Born: March 2, 1857; Hartford, Connecticut
- Died: December 22, 1949 (aged 92); Hartford, Connecticut
- Occupation: Author
- Relatives: James Hammond Trumbull (father); Annie Trumbull Slosson (aunt); Henry Clay Trumbull (uncle)
- Writing career
- Pen name: Annie Eliot

Annie Eliot Trumbull (1857–1949) was an American author of novels, short stories, and plays, associated with Hartford, Connecticut's "Golden Age".

== Life and career ==
A Christmas Accident, 1912

Annie Eliot Trumbull was born on March 2, 1857, in Hartford, Connecticut, to Sarah A. (Robinson) and James Hammond Trumbull, a noted philologist, historian, state librarian, and Connecticut Secretary of State. She graduated from the Hartford public high school in 1876.

Trumbull's works include seven novels, two plays, and short stories for The Atlantic, Lippincott's, New England Magazine, The Outlook, and Scribner's. Her first story and novel were published in 1881 and 1889, respectively, and her plays were written for the Saturday Morning Club before receiving wider distribution. Trumbull's fiction was among the first published by A. S. Barnes and Company. She was the Hartford Courant's literary editor and a close friend of its editor. She wrote an article that historically established the first witchcraft-related execution in New England, that of Alse Young. Trumbull was associated with authors of Hartford's literary "Golden Age", including Mark Twain and Charles Dudley Warner. As a friend and mentee of Twain, she wrote about her time with him and later helped to preserve his mansion. The Edison Film Company created A Christmas Accident, a silent short film based on Trumbull's story, in 1912.

She also traveled internationally and served in several civic posts in Connecticut, including the Town and Country Club, the Mark Twain Library and Memorial Commission, the Hartford Public Library. She also campaigned for women's suffrage. As a figure in Hartford, she was known to play tennis in her front yard court, to have made archery fashionable, to spend summers in her Castine, Maine, home, and winters traveling elsewhere. Trumbull died on December 22, 1949, at her family's homestead.

== Selected bibliography ==
Novels

- An Hour's Promise (1889)
- White Birches (1893)
- A Christmas Accident, and Other Stories (1897)
- A Cape Cod Week (1898)
- Rod's Salvation (1898)
- Mistress Content Cradock (1899)
- Life's Common Way (1903)

Plays

- A Masque of Culture (1893)
- A Wheel of Progress (1897)

Poetry

- Impressions (1927)
