= Johann Ludwig Burckhardt =

Swiss traveller and writer (1784–1817)

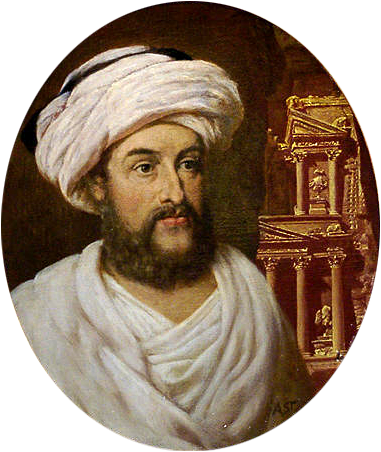
- Born: 24 November 1784; Lausanne, Vaud, Old Swiss Confederacy
- Died: 15 October 1817 (aged 32); Cairo, Ottoman Egypt
- Occupations: Traveller, geographer, orientalist

Johann Ludwig (also known as John Lewis, Jean Louis) Burckhardt (Arabic: يوهان لودفيك بركهارت; 24 November 1784 – 15 October 1817) was a Swiss traveller, geographer, and Orientalist. Burckhardt assumed the alias Sheikh Ibrahim Ibn Abdallah during his travels in Arabia. He wrote his letters in French and signed Louis. He is best known for rediscovering two of the world's most famous examples of rock-cut architecture – the ruins of the ancient Nabataean city of Petra in Jordan and the temples of Abu Simbel in Egypt.

== Youth and early travels ==
Burckhardt was born on 24 November 1784 in Lausanne, Switzerland to a wealthy Basel family of silk merchants, the Burckhardt family. His father was named Rudolf, son of Gedeon Burckhardt, an affluent silk ribbon manufacturer; his mother, Sara Rohner, was Rudolf's second wife following a brief marriage to the daughter of the mayor of Basel which ended in divorce.

After studying at the universities of Leipzig and Göttingen, he travelled to England in the summer of 1806 with goal of obtaining employment in the civil service. Unsuccessful, he took employment with the African Association with the objective of resolving some of the problems of the course of the Niger River. The expedition called for an overland journey from Cairo to Timbuktu. To prepare for the journey, he attended Cambridge University and studied Arabic, science and medicine. At this time he also began to adopt Arabian costume. In 1809 he left England and travelled to Aleppo, Syria to perfect his Arabic and Muslim customs. En route to Syria, he stopped in Malta and learned of Ulrich Jasper Seetzen who had left Cairo in search of the lost city of Petra and had subsequently been murdered. Once in Syria, he adopted the alias Sheikh Ibrahim Ibn Abdallah to hide his true European identity. While in Syria, he investigated local languages and archaeological sites and became the first European discoverer of Hittite or Luwian hieroglyphs. He suffered setbacks during his time in Syria having been robbed of his belongings more than once by people he had paid to guarantee his protection. After more than two years living and studying as a Muslim in Aleppo, he felt he could travel safely and not be questioned on his identity. To test his disguise, he made three journeys in the area of Syria, Palestine and Transjordan travelling as a poor Arab, sleeping on the ground and eating with camel drivers. With these trips being successful, he prepared to continue his journey to Cairo. He left Aleppo in early 1812 and headed south through Damascus, Ajloun, and Amman. In Kerak, he trusted his security to the local governor, Sheikh Youssef. The governor, under the guise of concern for his guest, liberated him of his most valuable belongings and then sent him south with an unscrupulous guide. The guide soon after took the remainder of his belongings and abandoned him in the desert. Burckhardt found a nearby Bedouin encampment and obtained a new guide and continued his journey south.

== Discoveries and death ==
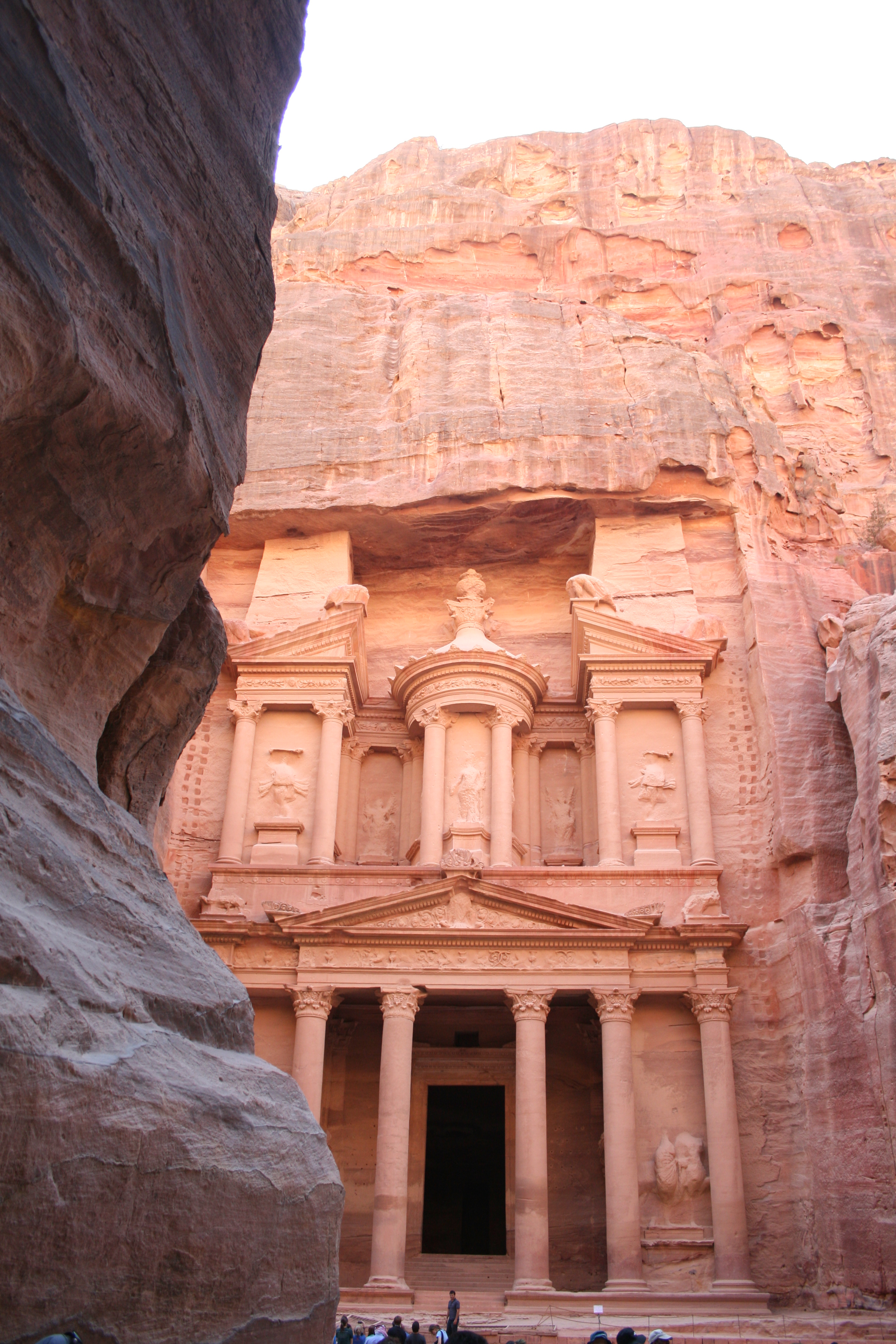
The treasury building at Petra

On the road to Cairo along the more dangerous inland route to Aqaba, Burckhardt encountered rumours of ancient ruins in a narrow valley near the supposed biblical tomb of Aaron, the brother of Moses. This region was the former Roman province of Arabia Petraea leading him to believe these were the ruins he had heard about in Malta. Telling his guide that he wished to sacrifice a goat at the tomb, he was led through the narrow valley where on 22 August 1812, he became the first modern European to lay eyes on the ancient Nabataean city of Petra:

I was particularly desirous of visiting Wady Mousa, of the antiquities of which I had heard the country people speak in terms of great admiration... I hired a guide at Eldjy, to conduct me to Haroun's tomb... I was without protection in the midst of a desert where no traveller had ever before been seen… Future travellers may visit the spot under the protection of an armed force; the inhabitants will become more accustomed to the researches of strangers; and the antiquities of Wady Mousa will then be found to rank amongst the most curious remains of ancient art…

An excavated mausoleum came in view, the situation and beauty of which are calculated to make an extraordinary impression upon the traveller, after having traversed for nearly half an hour such a gloomy and almost subterraneous passage as I have described. The natives call this monument Kaszr Faraoun, or Pharaoh's castle; and pretend that it was the residence of a prince. But it was rather the sepulchre of a prince, and great must have been the opulence of a city, which could dedicate such monuments to the memory of its rulers...

In comparing the testimonies of the authors cited in Reland's Palastina, it appears very probable that the ruins in Wady Mousa are those of the ancient Petra, and it is remarkable that Eusebius says the tomb of Aaron was shewn near Petra. Of this at least I am persuaded, from all the information I procured, that there is no other ruin between the extremities of the Dead sea and Red sea, of sufficient importance to answer to that city. Whether or not I have discovered the remains of the capital of Arabia Petraea, I leave to the decision of Greek scholars.

— Johann Burckhardt, Travels in Syria and the Holy Land, p.418–431

He could not remain long at the ruins or take detailed notes due to his fears of being unmasked as a treasure-seeking infidel. Seeing no evidence of the name of the ruins, he could only speculate that they were in fact the ruins of Petra which he had been informed about on his journey to Syria. He continued his travels and after crossing the southern deserts of Transjordan and the Sinai Peninsula, he arrived at Cairo on 4 September 1812.

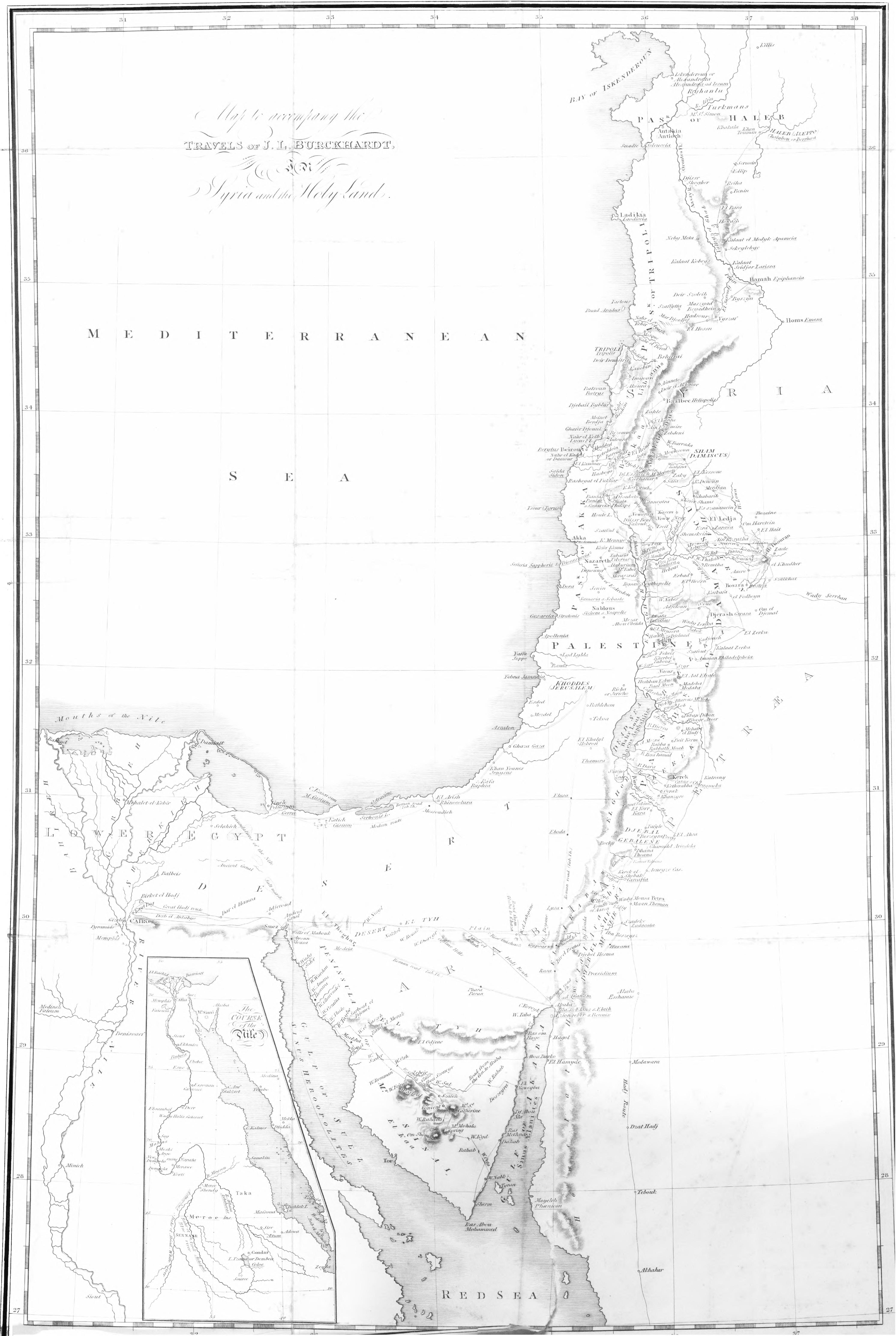
Burckhardt's map of Syria and Holy Land, showing Palestine and Egypt and the Ottoman Pashaliks

After spending four months in Cairo with no westbound caravans across the Sahara available, Burckhardt decided to journey up the Nile River to Upper Egypt and Nubia. He justified this to his employer with the argument that the information he would collect on African cultures would help him in his planned journey to west Africa. In January 1813, he departed Cairo travelling up the Nile river over land via donkey. He planned to reach Dongola in what is now modern-day Sudan. He was eventually blocked by hostile people less than 160 km from his goal near the third cataract of the Nile river. Journeying north, he came across the sand-choked ruins of the Great Temple of Ramesses II at Abu Simbel in March 1813. After considerable effort, he was unable to excavate the entrance to the temple. He later told his friend Giovanni Belzoni about the ruins and it was he who later returned in 1817 to excavate the temple. Burckhardt continued north to Esna. He later made an additional trip to Nubia travelling as far as Shendi near the Pyramids of Meroë. From here his journey took him to the Red Sea, where he resolved to make the pilgrimage to Mecca as this would enhance his credentials as a Muslim on his passage to Timbuktu.

Burckhardt wrote of his travels in Egypt and Nubia, where he witnessed slave trading: "I frequently witnessed scenes of the most shameless indecency, which the traders, who were the principal actors, only laughed at. I may venture to state, that very few female slaves who have passed their tenth year, reach Egypt or Arabia in a state of virginity."

After crossing the Red Sea, he entered Jeddah on 18 July 1814 and became sick with dysentery for the first time in his travels. Here he proved his credentials as a Muslim and was permitted to travel to Mecca. He spent several months in Mecca performing the various rituals associated with the Hajj which was unheard of for a European. He wrote of his detailed observations of the city and the deportment and culture of the local inhabitants. His journals were a valuable source of information for the African explorer Richard Burton who also later travelled to Mecca a few decades later. He later made a side trip to Medina where he again became sick with dysentery and spent three months recovering. Departing Arabia, he arrived in a state of great exhaustion in the Sinai peninsula and travelled overland to Cairo, arriving on 24 June 1815.

Burckhardt witnessed the plague epidemics that ravaged the Hejaz and Egypt between 1812 and 1816. He wrote: "In five or six days after my arrival [in Yanbu] the mortality increased; forty or fifty persons died in a day, which, in a population of five or six thousand, was a terrible mortality."

Burckhardt spent the remaining two years of his life editing his journals and living modestly in Cairo while waiting and preparing for the caravan that would take him west across the Sahara to Timbuktu and the Niger river. He made a trip to Alexandria and another to Mount Sinai where he visited Saint Catherine's Monastery before returning to Cairo. In Cairo, he met and introduced The Great Belzoni to Henry Salt, the British consul to Egypt, who commissioned Belzoni to remove the colossal bust of Ramesses II from Thebes to the British Museum. He was again stricken with dysentery and died in Cairo on 15 October 1817, never having made his intended journey to the Niger. He was buried as a Muslim, and the tombstone over his grave bears the name that he assumed on his travels in Arabia.

He had from time to time carefully transmitted to England his journals and notes, and a copious series of letters, so very few details of his journeys have been lost. He bequeathed his collection of 800 volumes of oriental manuscripts to the library of Cambridge University.

== Publications ==
His works were posthumously published by the African Association:

- Travels in Nubia (to which is prefixed a biographical memoir) (1819)
- Travels in Syria and the Holy Land (1822)
- Travels in Arabia (1829)
- Arabic Proverbs, or the Manners and Customs of the Modern Egyptians (1830)
- Notes on the Bedouins and Wahábys (1830).

== Sources ==
- Paul Lunde, "The Lure of Mecca," Saudi Aramco World, November/December 1974, pp. 14–21.
- "The Blue Nile", Alan Moorehead, Harper and Row, 1962.
- Eduard His: Johann Ludwig Burckhardt (Scheik Ibrahim), in: Basler Gelehrte des 19. Jahrhunderts. Benno Schwabe & Co., Basel 1941, S. 25 – 31.
- Speake, Jennifer, ed. (12 May 2014). Literature of Travel and Exploration: An Encyclopedia. Routledge. pp. 143–144. ISBN 978-1-135-45663-4.
