= Mount Hor =

Mountains mentioned in the Bible

Coordinates: 30°19′01″N 35°24′25″E

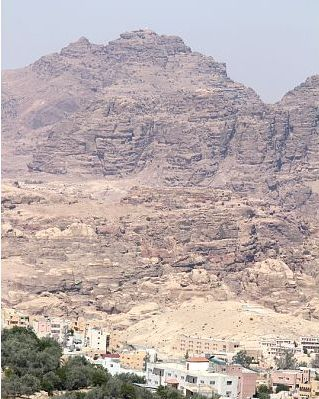
Jebel Harun near Petra, Jordan. One of the candidates for biblical Mount Hor, with a Byzantine monastery and a Mamluk mosque dedicated to Aaron's tomb.

Mount Hor (Hebrew: הֹר הָהָר, romanized: Hōr hāHār) is the name given in the Hebrew Bible to two distinct mountains. One borders the land of Edom in the area south of the Dead Sea, and the other is by the Mediterranean Sea at the Northern border of Israel. The first Mount Hor is especially significant to the Israelites, as Aaron the high priest, brother of Moses, died there.

== Mount Hor in Edom ==
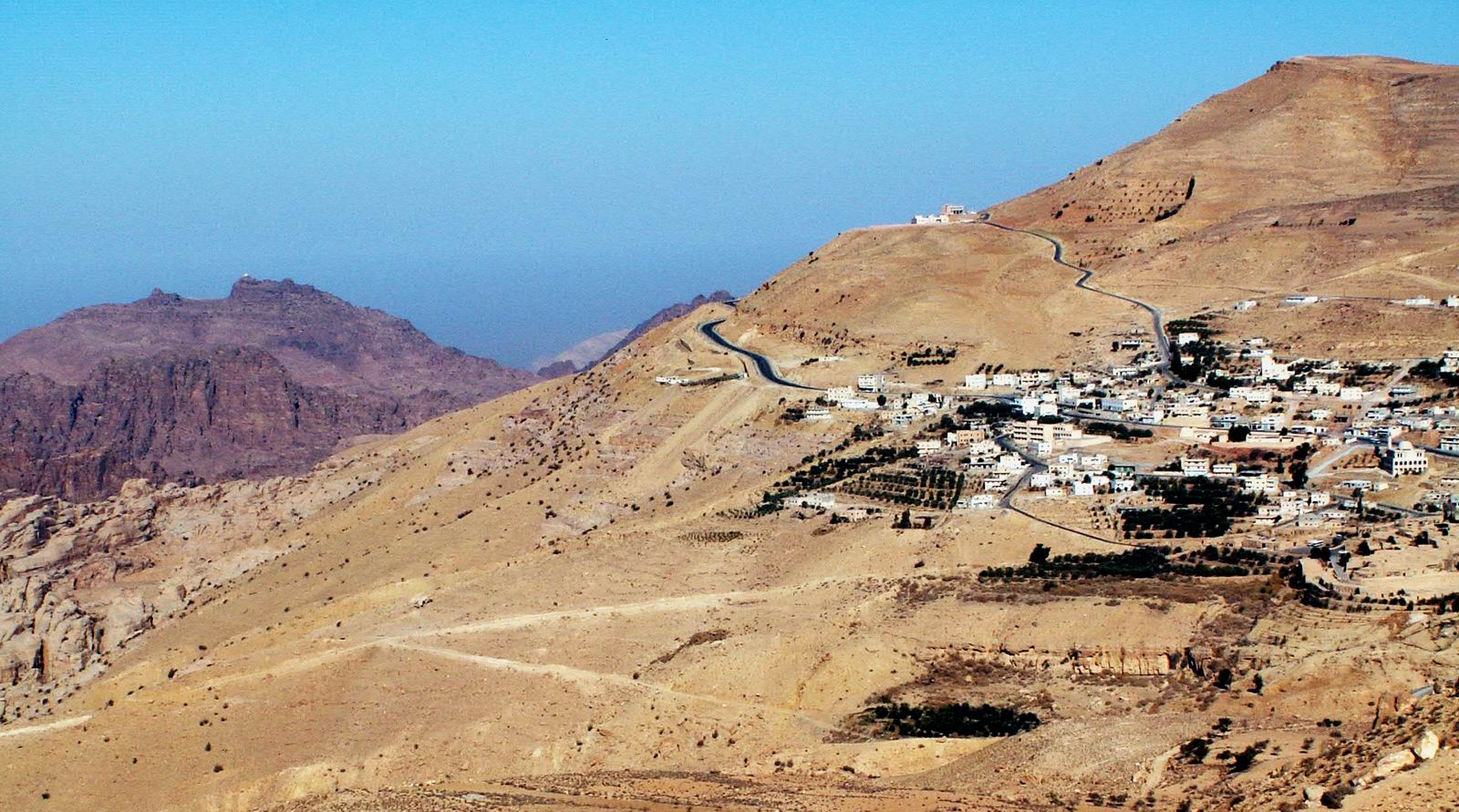
Jebel Harun ('Mount Aaron') near Petra

This Mount Hor is situated "in the edge of the land of Edom" (Numbers 20:23, 33:37) and was the scene of Aaron's divestiture, death and burial. The exact location of Mount Hor has been the subject of debate.

=== Jebel Harun ===
Based on the writing of Josephus, it has customarily been identified with the Jebel Nebi Harun ("Mountain of the Prophet Aaron" in Arabic) or simply Jebel Harun, a twin-peaked mountain 1,350 metres (4,430 ft) above sea-level in the Edomite Mountains on the east side of the Arabah section of the Jordan Rift Valley, not far from Petra. On the summit is a mosque from the Mamluk period, traditionally marking the so-called "Tomb of Aaron" and built over the remains of a Byzantine church, and in the saddle west of it are the remains of a Byzantine monastery dedicated to Aaron. A memorial church built there in the 5th century became the nucleus of a monastic-pilgrimage centre, referred to in a document from among the Petra Papyri dated to 573, as "the House of our Lord the Saint High-Priest Aaron" outside Petra.

=== Jebel Madara ===
Some investigators from the mid-19th until the beginning of the 20th century dissented from this identification: for example, Henry Clay Trumbull preferred the Jebel Madara, a peak about 15 miles northwest of 'Ain Kadis (possibly Kadesh Barnea), near the modern border between Israel and Egypt. Among others who favor this location are Wilton (The Negeb, 1863, pp. 127 ff.), de:Frants Buhl (Die Geschichte der Edomiter, 1893, p. 23), G.B Gray (A Critical and Exegetical Commentary on Numbers, p.270) and Bruno J. L. Baentsch (Exodus, Leviticus, and Numbers [1900–03 in German as Exodus – Leviticus – Numeri], p. 572.)

=== Other sites ===
Mount Uhud north of Medina has a shrine similar to the mosque on top of Jebel Harun that is connected by tradition to the life of Aaron.

Another site is in the Sinai, where some 2 km northwest from Saint Catherine's Monastery both Muslim and Christian shrines stand at the top of a hill. Tradition places there the site of the golden calf. The Muslim maqam marks the place where prophet Harun stood, with his footprint preserved nearby. Muslims from the area used to perform an annual ziyara, a procession to the monastery accompanied by sacrificing of camels, which took place until the Six-Day War.

== Northern Mount Hor ==
Another Mount Hor is mentioned in the Book of Numbers (Num. 34:7–8), defining the northern boundary of the Land of Israel. It is traditionally identified as the Nur or Amanus Mountains. In the Second Temple period, Jewish authors seeking to establish with greater precision the geographical definition of the Promised Land, began to construe Mount Hor as a reference to the Amanus range of the Taurus Mountains, which marked the northern limit of the Syrian plain. Rabbinic writings also declare Amanah a boundary of the land of Israel, saying "What constitutes the Land [of Israel], and what constitutes [the places] outside the Land [of Israel]? All that which inclines itself and drops down [precipitously] from Turos Amanus and inward (i.e. towards its south) is the Land of Israel. From Turos Amanus and outward (i.e. towards its north) are [places] outside the Land [of Israel]." In the 14th century, Ishtori Haparchi attempted to locate the northern Mount Hor and described the great difficulty in finding it. After discovering it, he noted that there was a place at the mountain’s summit called 'Kabutia'.

Mount Hor is also called Amanah, and is known as Mount Manus in the Jerusalem Targums, and Umanis in Targum Jonathan. Historical geographer, Joseph Schwarz (1804–1865), sought to establish the bounds of the Amanah mountain range described in rabbinic literature, adding that it is to be identified with Mount Hor, "the northern terminus of Palestine", and which, according to him, "extends south of Tripoli as the promontory of Mount Hor (Numbers 34:7), called in the period of the Grecian domination Theuprosopon, and now Ras al-Shaka, as far as the Mediterranean, and thence it runs a distance of 12 English miles to the south of Tyre, to the Ras al Nakhara, where its rocky cliffs, which are visible at a great distance, extend into the sea." By this description, Amanah is the southernmost Anti-Lebanon Mountains, equatable with Mount Hermon, and is not to be confused with Mount Amanus in southern Turkey.

== See also ==
- Mount Amana
- Tomb of Aaron
