= Charles J. Hoadly =

American librarian (1828–1900)

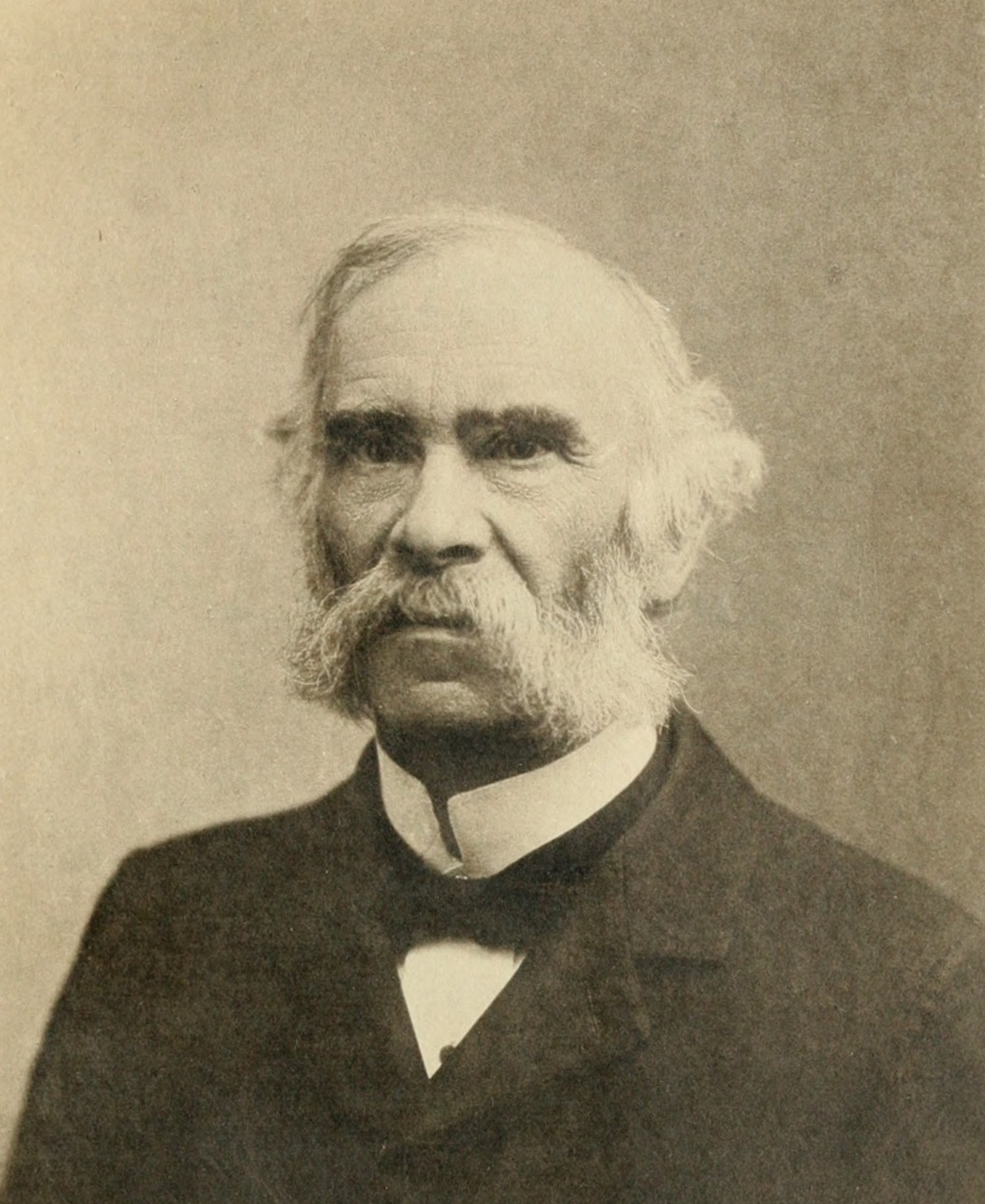
- Born: August 1, 1828; Hartford, Connecticut, US
- Died: October 19, 1900 (aged 72); Hartford, Connecticut
- Education: Trinity College (BA, MA)
- Occupation: Librarian
- Employer: Connecticut State Library
- Title: State Librarian of Connecticut
- Term: 1855–1900
- Predecessor: James Hammond Trumbull
- Successor: George S. Godard

Charles Jeremy Hoadly (1828–1900) was an American librarian and historian who served as State Librarian and director of the Connecticut State Library from 1855 to 1900. He insisted on spelling his surname as "Hoadly," though most of his extended family spelled it "Hoadley."

== Early life and education ==
Hoadly was born in Hartford, Connecticut, on August 1, 1828, the eldest son of William Henry Hoadley and Harriet Louisa Hillyer. After attending the Hopkins Grammar School in Hartford, he graduated valedictorian at Trinity College in 1851. Having earned his Bachelor of Arts degree, Hoadly then worked in the offices of the superintendent of public instruction while pursuing postgraduate education. Hoadly subsequently earned a Master of Arts degree from Trinity in 1854 and became the college's librarian that same year. He independently studied law and was admitted to the bar in the winter of 1855, though he never practiced law. In April, he was appointed Connecticut State Librarian, succeeding James Hammond Trumbull.

== Career and writings ==
In 1855, the Connecticut State Library was small and underresourced, holding only 3,000 volumes. During his 45-year tenure as State Librarian, Hoadly vastly expanded the collection, acquiring a remarkably complete collection of legal reports and statutes of Connecticut and other US states, as well as of Canada, England, Scotland, and Ireland. Thomas Day donated hundreds of books. Hoadly envisioned the library as a collection primarily for the use of legislators, judges, and lawyers. Later on, he also collected materials on Connecticut history, other state government documents, and the complete works of American statesmen. Hoadly's collection development philosophy favored completeness over comprehensiveness.

Hoadly served as president of the Connecticut chapter of Phi Beta Kappa from 1862 to 1867. He was a member of ten state historical societies, as well as of the New England Historic Genealogical Society and the American Antiquarian Society. After serving as its secretary for many years, he was elected president of the Connecticut Historical Society in 1894 and was annually reelected thereafter until his death. In 1899, he became the first honorary member of the Acorn Club of Connecticut. From 1865 to 1900, he served on Trinity College's board of trustees and library committee. A lifelong Episcopalian, he wrote a history of Christ Church Cathedral in 1879 and served on the church's board from 1865 to 1900.

Between 1857 and 1890, Hoadly edited the Records of the Colony and Plantation of New Haven (2 volumes) and the Public Records of the Colony of Connecticut (12 vols). These are the definitive editions of the state's colonial records. He subsequently edited and published two volumes of Revolutionary War-era records of Connecticut before his death.

Hoadly received an honorary Master of Arts degree from Yale University in 1879 and a Doctor of Laws degree from Trinity in 1889.

== Personal life ==
As his health declined, Hoadly submitted his resignation in 1898, but Governor Lorrin A. Cooke persuaded him to stay on. However, Hoadly's decline continued. He died at one o'clock on the afternoon of October 19, 1900. He was succeeded as State Librarian by his handpicked assistant librarian, George S. Godard, who led the State Library to new heights. At the time of his death, Hoadly was one of the longest-serving officials in Connecticut history, with one exception of George Wyllys, who had served for 61 years as Secretary of State (1735–1796).

Hoadly never married and had no issue. He was survived by three brothers and a sister: James H. Hoadley, George E. Hoadley, Francis A. Hoadley, and Mrs. Harriet L. Corwin. Another brother, Frederick W. Hoadley, a major in the Union Army, had been killed in the Vicksburg campaign in June 1863. A sister, Mary Robins Hoadley, had died in 1896.
