= George S. Godard =

American librarian (1865–1936)

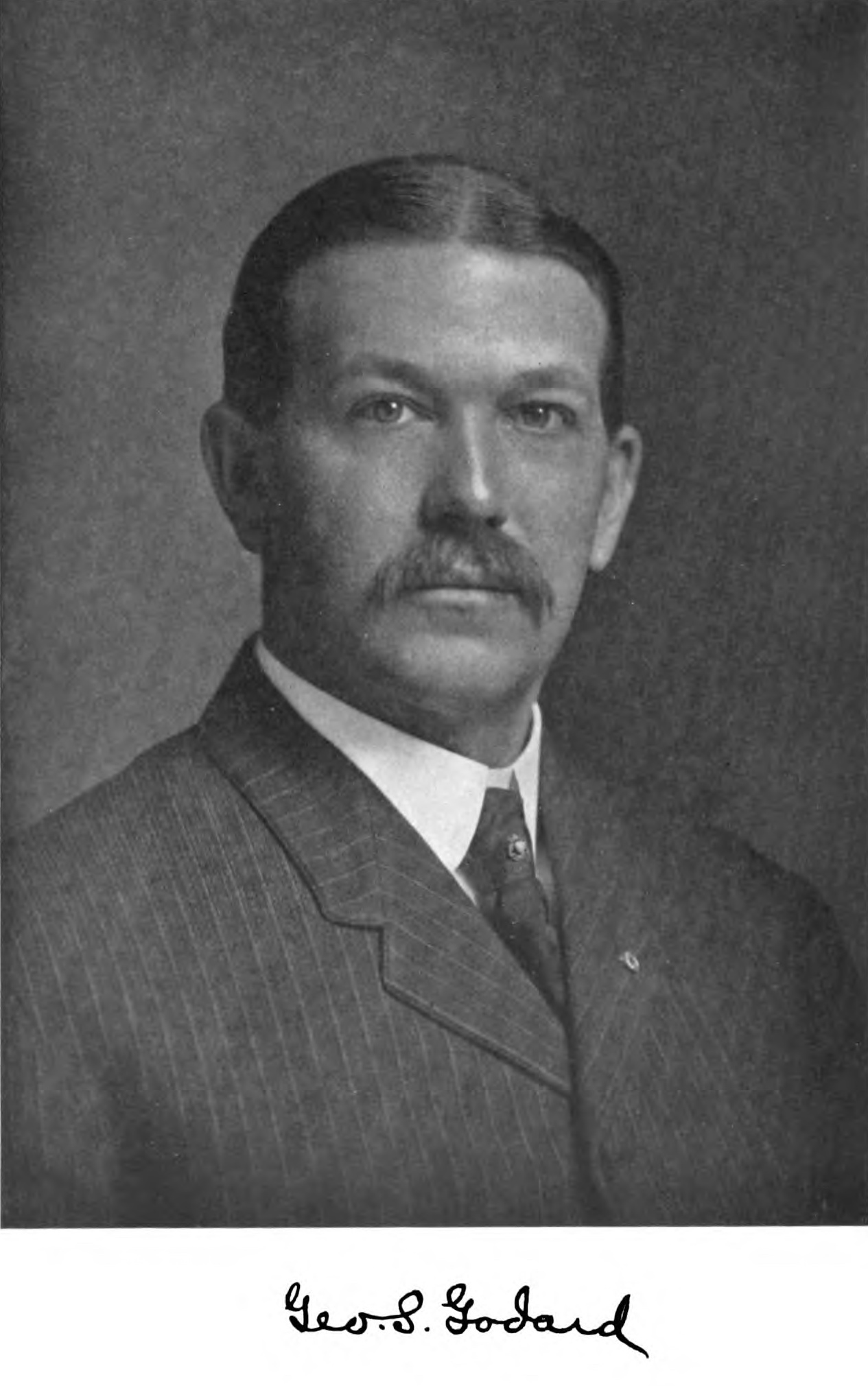
- Born: George Seymour Godard; June 17, 1865; Granby, Connecticut, US
- Died: February 12, 1936 (aged 70); Granby, Connecticut
- Education: Wesleyan University (BA); Yale University (BD)
- Occupation: Librarian
- Employer: Connecticut State Library
- Title: State Librarian of Connecticut
- Term: 1900–1936
- Predecessor: Charles J. Hoadly
- Successor: James Brewster

George Seymour Godard (June 17, 1865 – February 12, 1936) was an American librarian who served as State Librarian and director of the Connecticut State Library from 1900 to 1936. His political and administrative savvy led to the State Library becoming a well-funded and nationally recognized model of efficiency and public service. Godard was named to the American Association of Law Libraries Hall of Fame in 2010.

== Early life and education ==
Godard was born on June 17, 1865, in Granby, Connecticut, to parents Harvey and Sabra Lavinia (Beach) Godard. His father, a farmer, took him on a visit to the Connecticut State Capitol when he was six years old. His career originated with this visit, during which he met Charles J. Hoadly, the State Librarian at the time. Hoadly became his friend and mentor and recruited him to serve as his assistant and eventual successor in 1898.

Godard earned a Bachelor of Arts degree from Wesleyan University in 1892 and a Bachelor of Divinity from Yale University in 1895. He also pursued postgraduate studies at Northwestern University. Wesleyan conferred on him the honorary degrees of Master of Arts in 1916 and Doctor of Literature in 1935. Active in Wesleyan's alumni association, he served as president in 1916, trustee from 1919 to 1936, and secretary from 1920 to 1925.

== Career ==
Godard was appointed Connecticut State Librarian after eight years serving as Granby's town librarian and two years of service as Assistant to the State Librarian. He made it his mission to preserve the state's cultural heritage, convincing the General Assembly to pass an Act Concerning the Preservation of Books, Records, and Documents (1909), which authorized the collecting of early state and town documents centrally at the State Library. His efforts earned him the epithet "Preservation Godard."

Godard oversaw the construction of the State Library and Supreme Court building in Hartford, which opened in 1910 and is listed on the National Register of Historic Places. He served as president of the National Association of State Libraries in 1904, the Connecticut Library Association from 1905 to 1906, and the American Association of Law Libraries from 1910 to 1912.

In 1921, he negotiated the return to Connecticut, from the Massachusetts Historical Society, of the papers of Governor Jonathan Trumbull.

== Personal life ==
Godard married Kate Estelle Dewey of Granby in 1897 and had two sons, George and Paul. His wife and sons survived him.

Godard died at his Granby home following a long illness on February 12, 1936. He had spent months hospitalized at Hartford Hospital during the previous year, and doctors had to amputate his leg. Godard was interred at Granby Cemetery. Governor Wilbur Cross and State Supreme Court Chief Justice William M. Maltbie were among the honorary pallbearers at Godard's funeral.
