= Annie Trumbull Slosson =

Entomologist and writer (1838–1926)

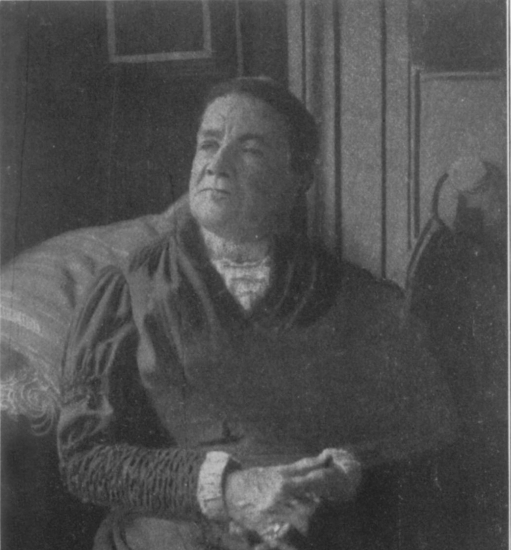
- Slosson in 1913
- Born: Anna Trumbull; May 18, 1838; Stonington, Connecticut
- Died: October 4, 1926 (aged 88); New York City
- Education: Hartford Female Seminary
- Known for: Short story writer Entomology
- Spouse: Edward Slosson (m. 1867)
- Scientific career
- Fields: Entomology
- Workplaces: New York Entomological Society
- Author abbrev. (zoology): Slosson

Annie Trumbull Slosson (né Anna Trumbull; May 18, 1838 – October 4, 1926) was an American author and entomologist. As a writer of fiction, Slosson was most noted for her short stories, written in the style of American literary regionalism, emphasizing the local color of New England. As an entomologist, Slosson is noted for identifying previously unknown species and for popularizing entomological aspects of natural history.

== Personal life ==
Slosson was the daughter of Gurdon Trumbull (1790-1875) and Sarah Ann (née Swan) Trumbull of Stonington, Connecticut. Her given name was Anna, although she appears to have consistently used the name Annie. Her father, Gurdon Trumbull, was originally from Norwich. He was a merchant and local politician in Stonington and became wealthy in the whale and seal fishery industries that were active in New England at the time. Annie Trumbull was the ninth of ten children, seven of whom survived to adulthood.

In 1852, the family moved to Hartford, where she attended public schools and the Hartford Female Seminary. She was married in Hartford on June 27, 1867 (another date given is June 6) to Edward Slosson (born c. 1814 – died 1871, brother of Justice John Slosson (1806–1872), who was a lawyer and a politician in New York City. They had no children.

Following the 1871 death of her husband, Slosson supported herself financially through her writing and later through the sale of certain entomological specimens. She resided in New York City with her relatives, although she traveled frequently for her endeavors in writing and entomology. By 1895, as most of her close relatives had died, Slosson lived with servants in rented residential quarters. Late in her life, Slosson was at times referred to as "the old bug woman".

Annie Trumbull Slosson died at her home at 26 Gramercy Park in New York City on October 4, 1926. She was buried in Hartford, Connecticut.

=== Family members ===
Several others of her family were notable in literary, scientific, and religious life:

- James Hammond Trumbull (1821–1897) (brother), philologist
- Annie Eliot Trumbull (1857–1949) (niece), author
- Gurdon Trumbull Jr. (1841–1903, brother), ornithologist and artist/illustrator
- Henry Clay Trumbull (brother) author, editor, and Sunday-school missionary
- William Cowper Prime (1825–1905) (brother-in-law), art historian, married in 1851 to sister Mary Hollister Trumbull, (1829 or 1830 – 1872). Slosson traveled with William Prime after both were widowed, and he also was involved with the New York Entomological Society.
- John Trumbull Robinson

== Career ==
=== Literary works ===
Slosson is considered a significant author in the "local color" (regionalism) movement of the late 19th century. Most of her works were short stories, many published in The Atlantic Monthly and Harper's Bazaar. Some were collected into book form. Literary works by Slosson include:

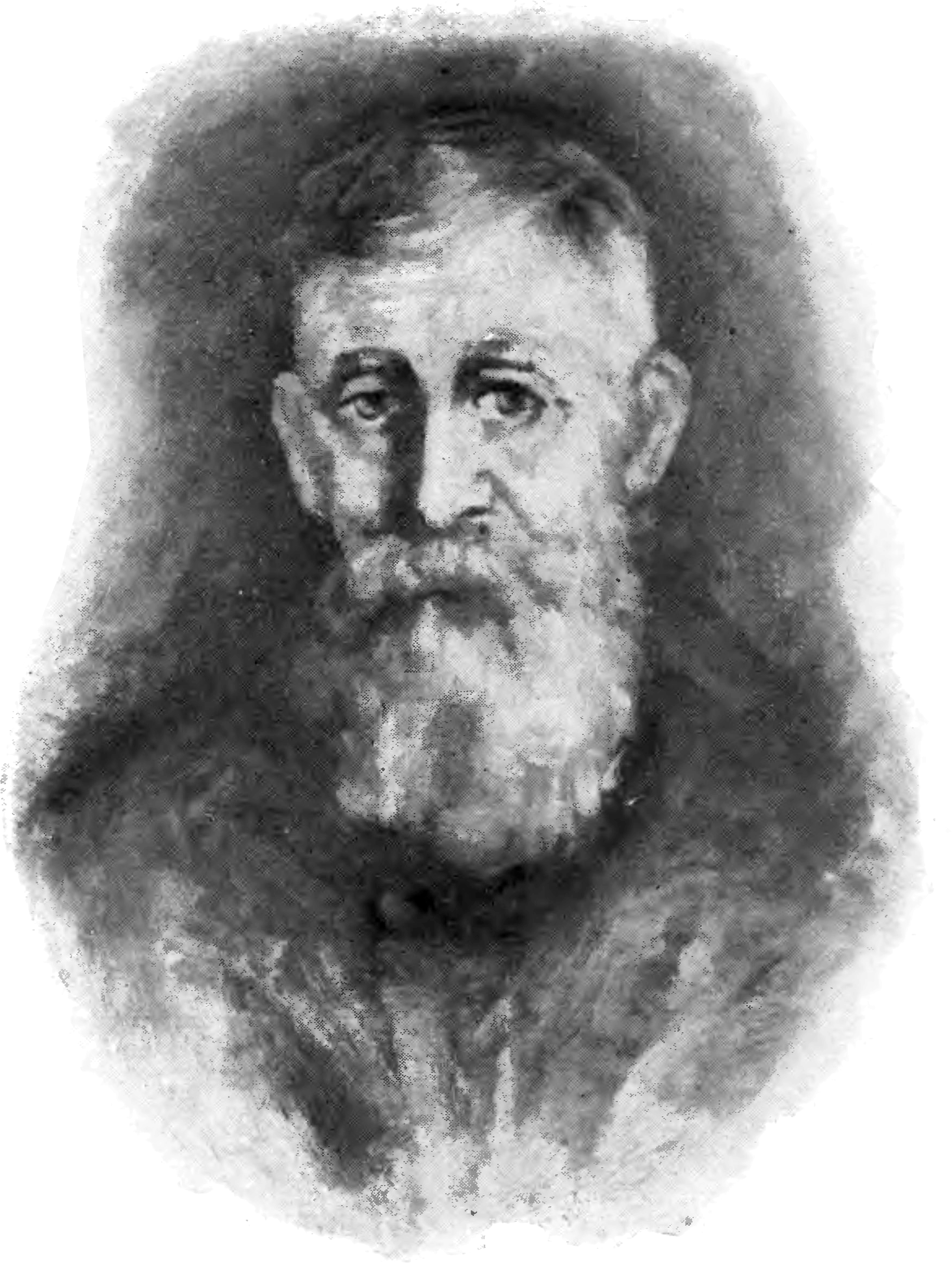
Frontispiece from Slosson's book Fishin' Jimmy

- The China Hunter's Club (1878)
- Aunt Randy. An Entomological Sketch (1887)
- Fishin' Jimmy (1889)
- Seven Dreamers (1890)
- The Heresy of Mehetabel Clark (1892)
- Anna Malann (1894)
- Dumb Foxglove and Other Stories (1898)
- Story-Tell Lib (1900)
- Aunt Abby's Neighbors (1902)
- White Christopher (1905)
- Simples from the Masters Garden (1907)
- A Dissatisfied Soul – A Tale of the White Mountains (1908)
- A local colorist (1909)
- A Little Shepherd of Bethlehem (1914)
- Puzzled Souls (1915)
- ...and Other Folks (1918)

Noted angling story teller, Henry Van Dyke said this about Fishin' Jimmy:

The loveliest of all her simple narratives is that which I have chosen to stand near the end of this book,--a kind of benediction on anglers.

=== Entomology ===
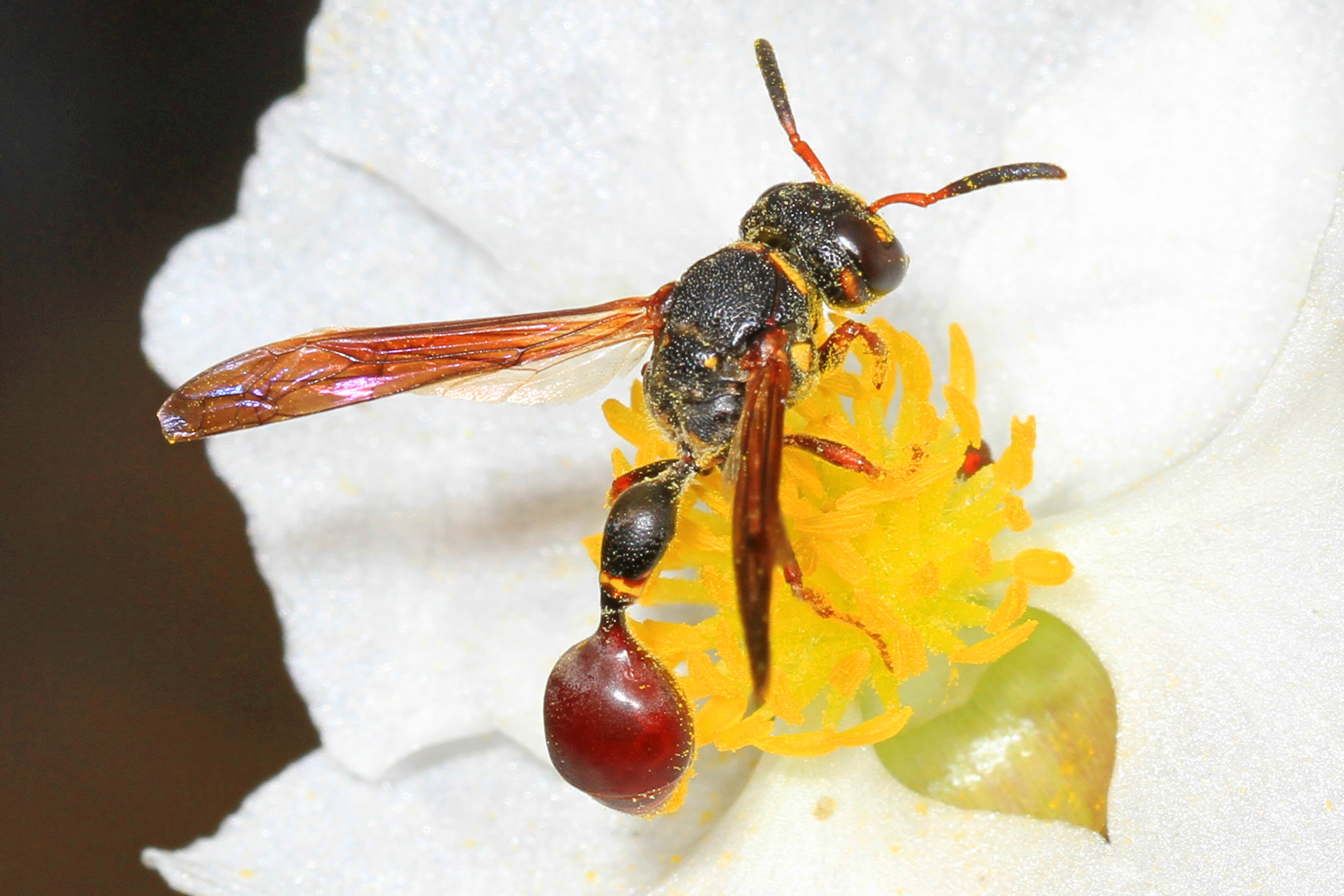
Zethus slossonae, a species of wasp named after Slosson

Slosson devoted much of her time to entomology later in life, especially after 1886, even though she had no formal training in entomology. She became interested in the study of insects at age 48 through investigation of insects inhabiting her home garden. Slosson previously had casual interest in botany at an earlier time and had corresponded with noted botanist Asa Gray about her findings near Echo Lake, New Hampshire. Early in her entomological studies, Slosson was nurtured in her studies by actor-turned-entomologist Henry Edwards.

Having had no formal scientific education, Slosson's expertise as an entomologist was enhanced through relationships she developed with other entomologists. These mentors included: Philip Powell Calvert, William T. Davis, Alpheus Spring Packard Jr., William Morton Wheeler, and Edward Payson Van Duzee, in addition to Asa Gray and Henry Edwards.

Much of Slosson's field work as an entomologist was conducted in Florida and New Hampshire, especially Franconia and Mount Washington. In the latter part of her career, she also conducted studies at the Delaware Water Gap.

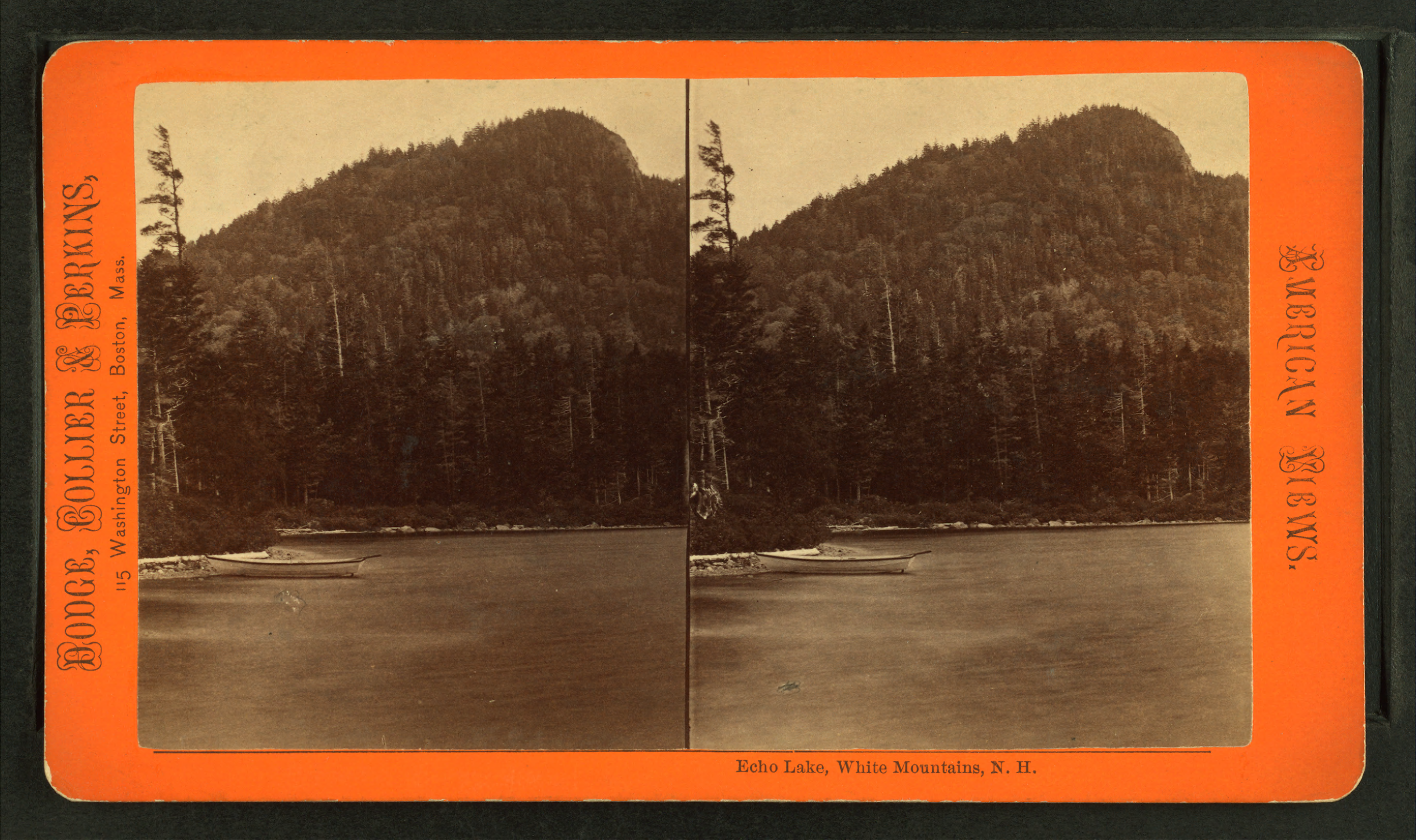
19th Century Image of Echo Lake, near Franconia, New Hampshire, where Slosson conducted field investigations

In 1892, Slosson was one of the founding members of the New York Entomological Society and was its first female member. It met for some time in her home in New York City. Later, through her efforts, the Society met at the American Museum of Natural History. Slosson authored an article in the first issue of the Journal of the New York Entomological Society appearing in March 1893.

Slosson wrote a significant number of scholarly articles in the field of entomology, and a few in the field of botany as well. Her entomological articles were published in various scientific journals, including Journal of the New York Entomological Society, Bulletin of the Brooklyn Entomological Society, Entomological News, Canadian Entomologist, and Entomologica Americana.

Slosson collected an extensive number of insect specimens in Florida (especially near Miami) as well as New York City and the White Mountains of New Hampshire. Over one-hundred newly described insects bear the species epithet slossoni (or slossonae) in her honor, often because she collected the first specimen. Her collection of some 35,000 insects was donated to the American Museum of Natural History. Some examples of insects named for her include: Coelioxys slossoni, a leaf-cutter bee, Rhopalotria slossoni, a weevil associated with cycads, especially Zamia pumila, and Zethus slossonae, a wasp. Another previously unknown species that Slosson described was Eubaphe meridiana, a species of geometer moth.

At times, Slosson herself named new species that she identified, usually naming the species after the locale in which she found it. An example is Dasylophia puntagorda, found near Punta Gorda, Florida.

=== Intersection of literature and entomology ===
Slosson published an article in the Bulletin of the Brooklyn Entomological Society in 1916 addressing her two passions, fiction writing and entomology. In the article, she contended that the two interests are complementary. Slosson is stated to have said about entomology and literature that these "work well together in harness, each being a good running mate for the other." Her fiction writing is said to contain many details of the natural world, while her scientific publications have an engaging style.

By the time of her death in 1926, she was known for her entomological work, but her fiction was largely forgotten. Some literary scholars have suggested a possible resurgence of interest in her literary works.

== Additional sources ==
- Trumbull, Gurdon (1841–1903), Biodiversity Heritage Library.
- New York Entomological Society (n.d.). "A Short History of the Society"—accessed 14 February 2010.
- New York Times (6 August 1897, p. 5). Death list of a day. (obituary for James Hammond Trumbull--link to entry)
- New York Times (5 October 1926, p. 29) (obituary for Annie Trumbull Slosson--Abstract)
- Slosson, A. T. (1918). "Reminiscences of the Early Days of The New York Entomological Society". Journal of the New York Entomological Society. 26: 134–137.
- Bailey, Martha J. (1994). American Women in Science: A Biographical Dictionary. University of Michigan. ISBN 9780874367409, pp. 360–361.
- Bonta, Marcia (1991). Women in the Field: America's Pioneering Women Naturalists. The Texas A&M University Press. ISBN 9780890964897, pp. 167–173.
