= Thomas Lechford =

English lawyer and author

Thomas Lechford (c. 1590 – 1644) was an English lawyer and writer born in London who wrote about his experiences in the Massachusetts Bay Colony.

Lechford emigrated to Boston in 1638, and became the first person to practice law in New England.

Lechford returned to England in 1641, very dissatisfied with his experiences in the colony. Lechford published Plain Dealing, or Newes from New England (London, 1642), and New England's Advice to Old England (1644). A new edition of with notes by J. Hammond Trumbull was published in 1867.
