= Thomas Robbins (minister) =

Congregational minister, bibliophile and antiquarian

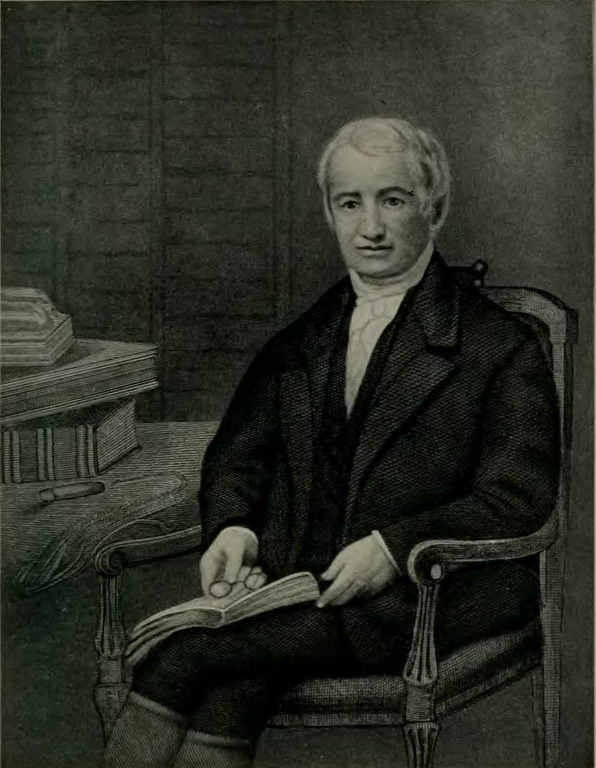
- Born: August 11, 1777; Norfolk, Connecticut
- Died: September 13, 1856 (aged 79); Colebrook, Connecticut
- Education: Yale University; Williams College; Harvard Divinity School
- Occupation: Minister
- Known for: First librarian of the Connecticut Historical Society
- Title: Rev.

Rev. Thomas Robbins, D.D. (August 11, 1777 – September 13, 1856) was an American Congregational minister. A bibliophile and an antiquarian, he became the first librarian of the Connecticut Historical Society.

== Early life and education ==
Robbins was born in Norfolk, Connecticut, the ninth child of the Rev. Ammi Ruhamah Robbins, and Elizabeth (Le Baron) Robbins. Ammi was the first minister of Norfolk. He had 12 siblings.

Robbins entered Yale University at the age of 15. In January 1796, he began a diary which he kept up through 1854. While in college, Robbins also began collecting books, a passion that would eventually define his life.

He graduated from Yale in 1796, though he spent his senior year at Williams College, where his father was a trustee, and is listed as a 1796 alumnus of Williams as well.

== Career ==
=== Teacher and minister ===
For the first six years after graduating from university, Robbins taught, preached, and studied theology. In 1798, he was licensed to preach by the Litchfield North Association. From 1799 to 1802, he was in charge of the Danbury, Connecticut's academy.

In 1803, the Connecticut Missionary Society, the evangelistic arm of the Connecticut General Association of Congregational ministers, sent him to a new settlement on the Western Reserve, Ohio where he spent three years organizing churches before returning to New England in poor health. From 1808 to 1827, he preached in East Windsor, Connecticut. His brother, Rev. Francis L. Robbins, was the pastor in the next town of Enfield, Connecticut. From there he went to preach in Stratford, Connecticut. Robbins succeeded his uncle, Rev. Lemuel Le Baron, as Congregational minister in Mattapoisett, Massachusetts, preaching his first sermon there September 25, 1831.

In 1837, Robbins was appointed to the Massachusetts Board of Education. The following year, he received the Doctor of Divinity degree from Harvard Divinity School. Robbins was a Trustee of Williams College from 1842 to 1853. He was also elected to the Connecticut Academy of Arts and Sciences, and the National Institution of Science of Washington.

He was elected a member of the American Antiquarian Society in 1815.

=== Librarian ===
"He commenced his collection while in college, by preserving his textbooks, and in 1809 made a formal beginning of a permanent library, by making a catalogue of his entire stock, consisting of one hundred and thirty volumes, with a determination that he would add at least one hundred volumes a year as long as he should live." (from Robbins' obituary, written by Henry Barnard.)

—

Robbins' became a librarian at the end of his career. The seeds were sown in 1822 when Robbins publicly suggested the creation of a historical society in Connecticut. After its establishment in 1825 in Hartford, Connecticut, he became its first corresponding secretary.

In 1844, educator Henry Barnard offered Robbins the position of librarian at the Connecticut Historical Society, the society elders being as interested in Robbins' book collection as they were in Robbins' services. By the time Robbins left for Hartford, he had over 4,000 volumes, mostly on subjects of history and theology. A notable part of the collection was the 385 volume Journal des sçavans, the earliest published scholarly periodical. The collection also included 596 coins, such as a Roman denarius.

Never having married, he revised his Last Will several times in an effort to assure his library was sustained after his death. On May 27, 1846, he bequeath his library to the historical society in exchange for an annual salary of $600.

== Death and legacy ==
Robbins died at the age of 79 in Colebrook, Connecticut at the home of his niece. In addition to the extensive book collection, Robbins bequeath $3,000 to the society to care for the books, and to enlarge the collection. Each book contains a bookplate and all the bookplates include a record of the price paid for the book. The society also has Robbins' original bookshelves.

His portrait, painted by Reuben Moulthrop in 1801, is located in Hartford at the Connecticut Historical Society's museum.

== Selected works ==
- (1815). An historical view of the first planters of New-England. Hartford: Peter B. Gleason and Company. OCLC 2367757
- Diary of Thomas Robbins, D. D., 1796–1854, Volume 2. Boston: Thomas Todd, printer, 1887. Ed. by Tarbox.
