= A Christmas Accident =

- Full film
- Directed by: Harold M. Shaw
- Written by: Bannister Irwin (scenario)
- Story by: Annie Eliot Trumbull (1897)
- Starring: William Wadsworth; Mrs. William Bechtel; Augustus Phillips; Ida Williams; Edna Hammel
- Production company: Thomas A. Edison, Inc.
- Distributed by: General Film Company (1911); Kino Video (2001)
- Release date: December 14, 1912
- Running time: 15 minutes
- Country: United States
- Language: English

A Christmas Accident is a 1912 American Christmas film. Prints and/or fragments of the film were found in the Dawson Film Find in 1978.

== Story ==
Two families live next door in the same house. The Biltons have many children and strive to make ends meet. The Giltons are well-to-do. Mr. Gilton is a grumpy old man, who gets annoyed by the children. He accuses the Biltons of having poisoned his dog. On Christmas Eve Mr. Gilton accidentally bumps into the Bilton home, and he is overwhelmed when one of the children gives him her present.

== Cast ==
- William Wadsworth - Mr. Gilton
- Mrs. William Bechtel - Mr. Gilton's wife
- Augustus Phillips - Mr. Bilton
- Ida Williams - Mr. Bilton's wife
- Edna Hammel - Cora Cordelia Bilton

== See also ==
- List of Christmas films
