= Eubaphe meridiana =

Scientific classification
- Domain: Eukaryota
- Kingdom: Animalia
- Phylum: Arthropoda
- Class: Insecta
- Order: Lepidoptera
- Family: Geometridae
- Genus: Eubaphe
- Species: E. meridiana

Binomial name
- Eubaphe meridiana (Slosson, 1889)

Synonyms
- Eudule meridiana Slosson, 1889

Species of moth

Eubaphe meridiana (the little beggar) is a moth in the family Geometridae. It was first described by Annie Trumbull Slosson in 1889. It is found in the eastern United States. The species is listed as endangered in the US state of Connecticut.
