= George C. F. Williams =

American politician

George Clinton Fairchild Williams (February 26, 1857 – November 15, 1933) was an American medical doctor, genealogist, and historian who served as president of the Connecticut Historical Society from 1919 to 1922 and 1926 to 1934.

He was born in Cheshire, Connecticut, the son of John and Lucinda (Fairchild) Williams.

He represented his hometown of Cheshire as a member of the Connecticut House of Representatives in 1881.

A graduate of Yale University, he was a member of the Acorn Club and the National Society of Sons of the American Revolution. He was president of the Capewell Horse Nail Company of Hartford.

He died in 1933 and was buried at Cedar Hill Cemetery in Hartford, Connecticut.
