= Connecticut Museum of Culture and History =

Coordinates: 41.77293°N 72.70525°W

- Entrance façade to the museum (2026)
- Established: 1825
- Location: 1 Elizabeth Street, Hartford, Connecticut, United States
- Type: History museum, library, archive, education center
- Director: Rob Kret
- Public transit access: Connecticut Transit Hartford 11 Simsbury-Granby Express 72 Asylum Ave
- Website: connecticutmuseum.org

The Connecticut Museum of Culture and History, formerly the Connecticut Historical Society, is a private, non-profit organization that serves as the official state historical society of Connecticut. Founded in Hartford 1825, it ranks among the oldest historical societies in the United States.

The Connecticut Museum of Culture and History is a non-profit museum, library, archive and education center that is open to the public. It houses a research center containing 270,000 artifacts and graphics and over 100,000 books and pamphlets. It holds one of the largest costume and textile collections in New England. It carried the name Connecticut Historical Society from its establishment until 2023.

== History ==
In 1825, a petition signed by citizens of Connecticut including Thomas Robbins, John Trumbull, Thomas Day, and William W. Ellsworth, was presented to the Connecticut General Assembly, calling for the establishment of a society to preserve historical materials. The General Assembly gave its consent, and the Connecticut Historical Society was established to collect objects important to the history of the Connecticut, and the United States more generally. The first elected officers were Trumbull, Day, Robbins, Thomas Church Brownell and Walter Mitchell.

With the rise in prominence of Hartford in the 1820s, the society's committee decided to house its first meetings in the city. Yet despite a flurry of activity, the society became inactive after 1825 and it was not until 1839 when new interest regained. The first official quarters for the Connecticut Historical Society were over a store at 124 Main Street in Hartford.

The society's new ideals and direction were spearheaded by educationalist Henry Barnard, who recommended that the society enroll members from around the state, encouraged a history and genealogy magazine and retrieved speakers for lectures who could address groups throughout Connecticut.

As its collections expanded, the historical society moved into a room in the newly built Wadsworth Athenaeum in 1843. By 1844, the collections had grown to include 250 bound volumes of newspapers, 6,000 pamphlets, and various collections of manuscripts, coins, portraits and furniture. New officers were elected including David D. Field. The Historical Society appointed Thomas Robbins as its first librarian because of his extensive book collection and antiquarian expertise.

Under Robbins's tenure, the new quarters were open six days a week and interpretive tours of objects were given. Some early objects in the collection were a chest of William Brewster, a tavern sign of General Israel Putnam and a bloodstained vest worn by Colonel William Ledyard at the Battle of Groton Heights. After the death of Robbins in 1856, Connecticut historians James Hammond Trumbull and Charles J. Hoadly contributed to the society's work through various published research and lectures. The first woman elected in the organization was Ellen D. Larned in 1870.

In 1893, the society hired Albert Carlos Bates as a full-time librarian and it was under his tenure that membership doubled, the annual income increased five-fold and the collection grew. To accommodate the expanding collection, the Historical Society bought a house on Elizabeth Street, which had previously belonged to the inventor Curtis Veeder, in the West End of Hartford. The building was altered between the 1950s and 1970s, to accommodate book stacks, exhibition galleries, an auditorium and a reading room.

In the early 2000s, the organization hired Bruce Mau and Frank Gehry to design a new museum near Trinity College, but lack of funds prevented the project from happening. From 2003 to 2007, the Connecticut Historical Society operated the Old State House and created a permanent exhibit "History Is All Around Us". In 2023, the organization updated their name from Connecticut Historical Society to the Connecticut Museum of Culture and History.

== Exhibits ==
Permanent exhibits include "Making Connecticut", about the history of Connecticut, and "Inn & Tavern Signs". There are also galleries for temporary exhibitions. Recent exhibit topics include the American School for the Deaf, women and needlework, the Kellogg brothers lithography firm, women's basketball, the Amistad, a history of cleanliness, the Civil War and Eliphalet Chapin, an 18th-century furniture maker.

== See also ==
- Albert Carlos Bates, librarian 1893–1940
- George C. F. Williams, president 1919–1922, 1926–1934
- Newton C. Brainard, president 1953–1963
- List of historical societies in Connecticut
