= Tomb of Aaron (Jordan) =

Supposed burial place of Aaron, the brother of Moses

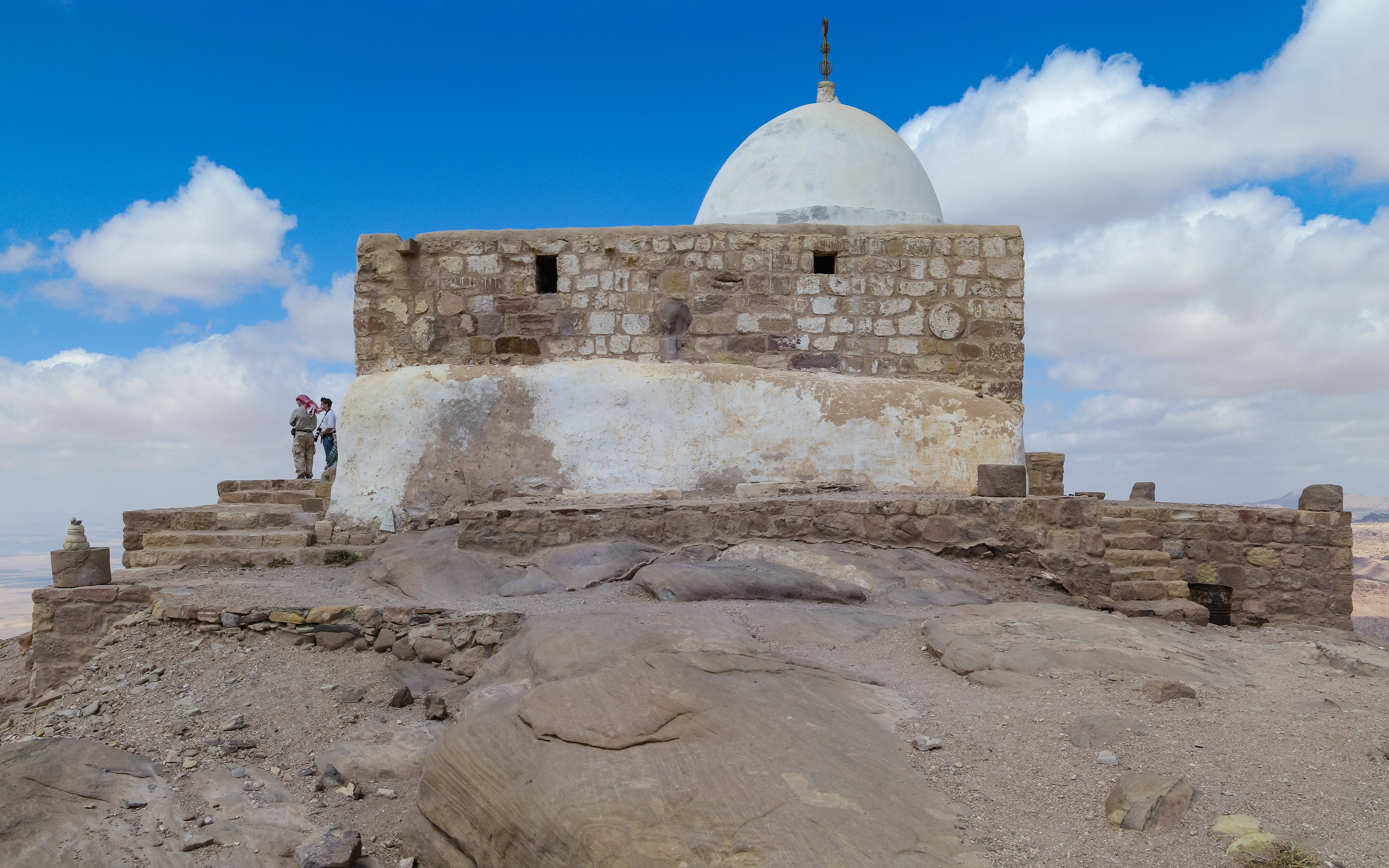
- Aaron's tomb on Jabal Hārūn in Petra

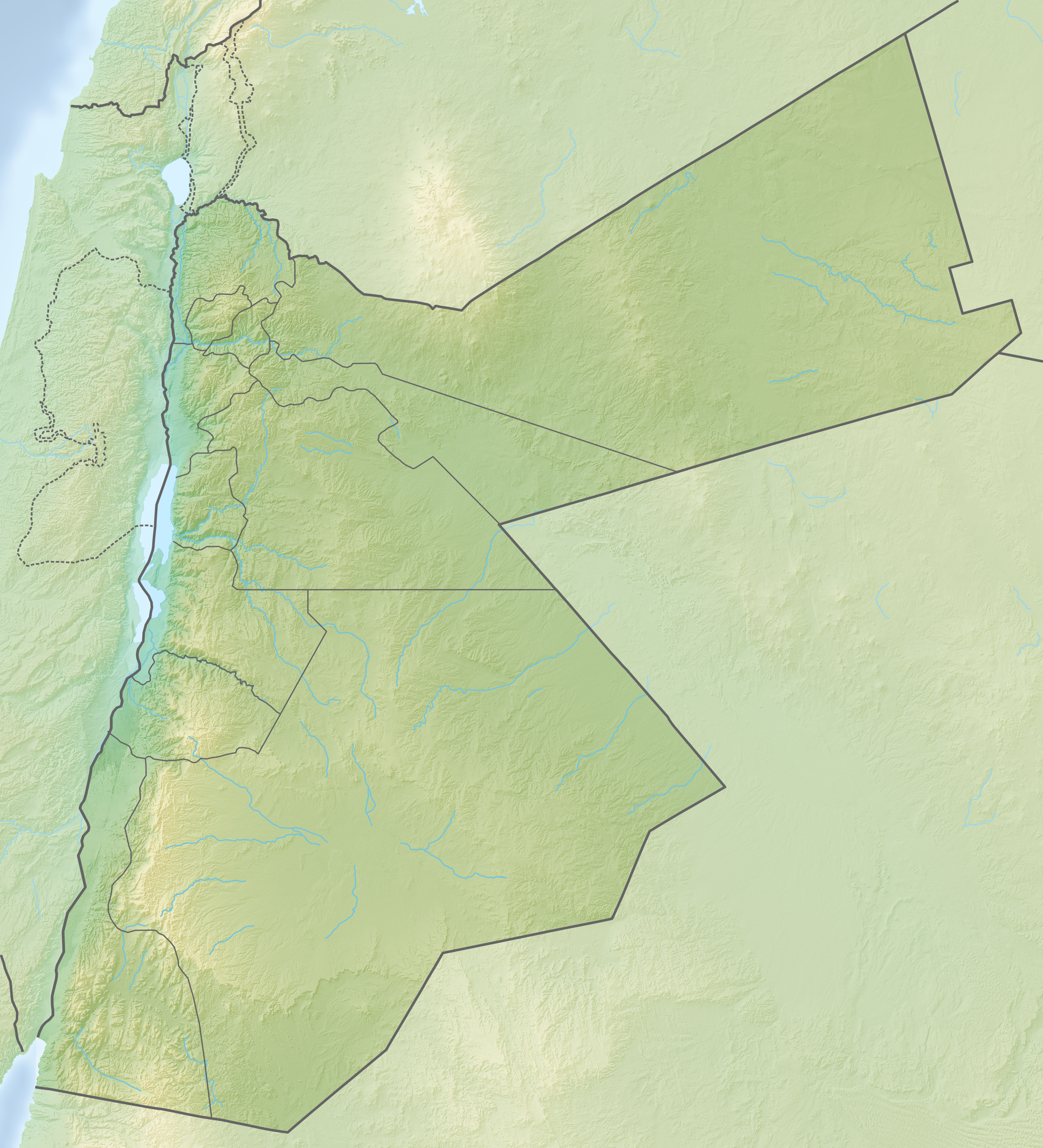
- Location of the tomb in Jordan

Religion
- Affiliation: Islam; Judaism; Christianity
- Ecclesiastical or organisational status: Shrine; Mosque
- Governing body: Petra Development and Tourism Region Authority
- Status: Active

Location
- Location: Jabal Hārūn, near Petra, Ma'an Governorate
- Country: Jordan
- Interactive map of Tomb of Aaron
- Coordinates: 30°19′01″N 35°24′23″E

Architecture
- Style: Islamic; Byzantine
- Founder: Sultan al-Nasir Muhammad (last full reconstruction)
- Completed: 719 AH (1319/1320 CE) (current building)

Specifications
- Length: 10 m (33 ft)
- Width: 8 m (26 ft)
- Dome: One
- Inscriptions: Mamluk-period dedicatory inscriptions; Jewish and Greek inscriptions left by pilgrims
- Materials: Sandstone
- Elevation: 1,350 m (4,429 ft)

Website
- visitpetra.jo

The Tomb of Aaron is the purported burial site of Aaron, the brother of Moses, according to Jewish, Christian, and local Muslim traditions. The site is marked by a small mosque serving as a shrine to the Muslim prophet Haroun (Aaron), located at the summit of Jabal Hārūn ('Mount Aaron') at an altitude of 1,350 metres (4,430 ft), the highest point near Petra, in the Ma'an Governorate of Jordan.

There are two different places named in the Torah as Aaron's place of death and burial, Mount Hor and Moseroth (also known as Mosera). Additionally, there are different interpretations for the location of each of the two. Jews have considered the mountain near Petra as the biblical Mount Hor since, at least, the time of Josephus. Christians have adopted this identification since the Byzantine period and had built a monastery serving as a pilgrimage centre there. The local Muslim tradition places Aaron's tomb at the same site, although there is at least one other local tradition locating it in Sinai. There used to be a rich repertoire of general and local Muslim legends regarding Aaron's tomb. The current building was completed during the Mamluk period at the beginning of the 14th century CE.

== History ==
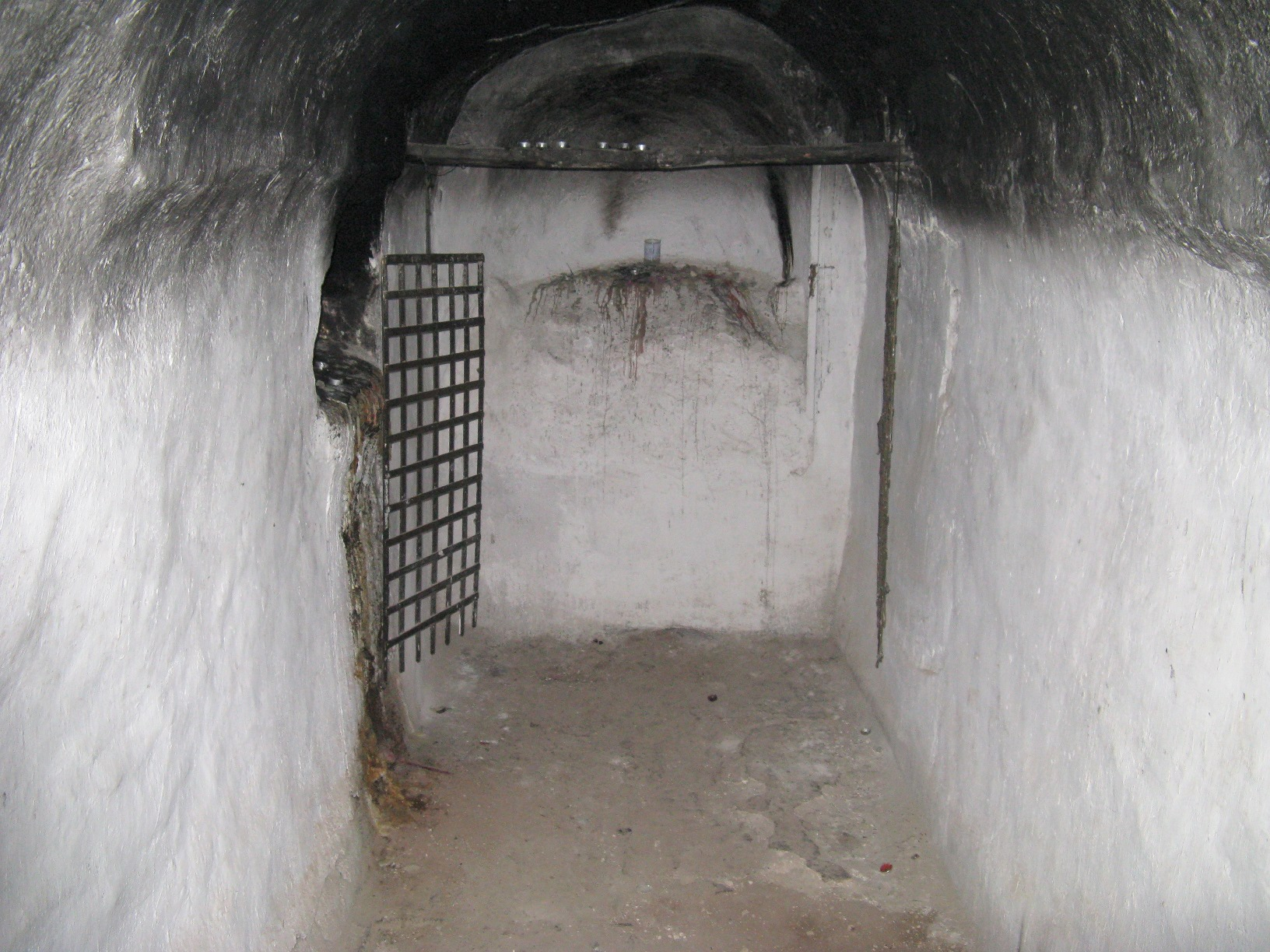
Aaron's tomb, underground chamber under the mosque

Around 1100 CE, Baldwin I, Crusader king of Jerusalem, visited the monastery with his entourage.

The current building was completed during the Mamluk period at the beginning of the 14th century CE. In the early 20th century, it was documented that the Bedul tribe made an annual pilgrimage to the Tomb of Aaron, while the Liyathnah tribe visited it twice a year.

== Description ==
=== Mosque with tomb ===
The shrine consists of a room, 10 by 8 metres (33 by 26 ft), made of sandstone, covered by a white dome, and a small courtyard. Above the door of the shrine is the date of its renewal, in 719 AH (1319/1320 CE), by Sultan al-Nasir Muhammad, son of Qalawun. The shrine was adopted as sacred for Islam from the time of the Muslim conquests in the 7th century AH, continuing its veneration that dated from the times of the Nabateans of Petra and the ancient Jews before them.

=== Byzantine monastery ===
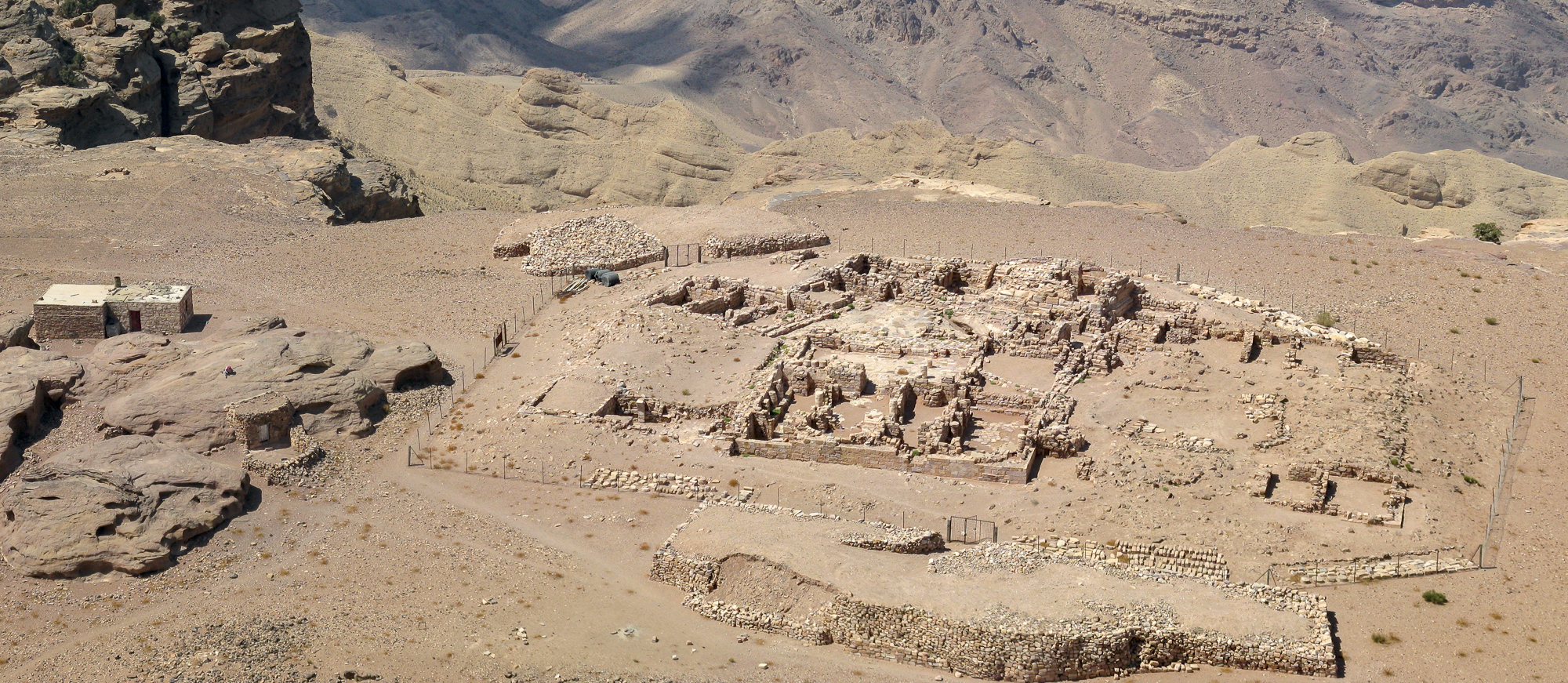
Excavations of the Byzantine monastery in the saddle below the peak (2008)

Ruins of a Christian monastery from the Byzantine period are close by the summit.

== In the Bible ==
The Pentateuch gives two accounts of Aaron's death.

=== On Mount Hor ===
The Book of Numbers (Chapter 20) gives a detailed statement to the effect that, soon after the incident at Meribah (Kadesh), when Moses and Aaron showed impatience by bringing water out of a rock to quench the thirst of the people after God commanded them to speak to the rock, Aaron, his son Eleazar, and Moses ascended Mount Hor, on the edge of the borders of Edom. There, Moses stripped Aaron of his priestly garments and gave them to Eleazar. Aaron died and was buried on the summit of the mountain, and the people mourned for him thirty days.

Mount Hor is usually associated with the mountain near Petra in Jordan, known in Arabic as Jabal Hārūn (Aaron's Mountain), upon the summit of which a mosque was built in the 14th century. Josephus and Eusebius both describe its location above the city of Petra.

=== At Moseroth ===
The other account is found in the Book of Deuteronomy, where Moses is reported as saying that Aaron died at Moseroth (also known as Mosera) and was buried there. Mosera is sometimes identified with el-Tayibeh, a small fountain at the bottom of the pass leading to the ascent of Jebel Harun. However others are of the opinion that the location of Mosera cannot be here, since the itinerary in Numbers 33:31–37 records seven stages between Mosera and Mount Hor. For similar reasons, others still doubt that Mount Hor can in reality be identified with Jabal Hārūn.

== Religious status & access ==
The site at Jabal Hārūn is occasionally visited by both Jewish pilgrims and Muslims.

Jordanian authorities regard the Tomb of Aaron as a mosque and forbid Jewish prayer services at the site. In August 2019, a group of Israeli tourists shared a video of themselves dancing with a Torah scroll at the site. Authorities then confiscated religious items from the group and closed the summit to foreign tour groups that do not have permission to visit from the Awqaf Ministry. Unrestricted access to the tomb was restored in December. Israel has a regulated tourism mechanism directly with the Jordanian government.

== See also ==
- Islam in Jordan
- List of mosques in Jordan
