= Albert Carlos Bates =

American librarian, book collector, and historian (1865–1954)

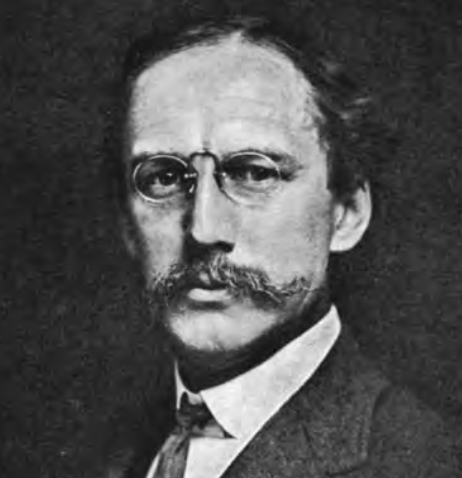

Member of the Connecticut House of Representatives from East Granby
- In office 1905–1907
- Preceded by: John G. Willoughby
- Succeeded by: George H. Clark

Personal details
- Born: March 12, 1865 East Granby, Connecticut, U.S.
- Died: March 27, 1954 (aged 89)
- Party: Republican

Albert Carlos Bates (March 12, 1865 – March 27, 1954) was an American librarian, bibliographer, genealogist, book collector, and historian. He was born in East Granby, Connecticut. He served as librarian of the Connecticut Historical Society from 1893 to 1940. He was a member of the Acorn Club. He was awarded an honorary Master of Arts by Trinity College in 1920. Bates was an avid book collector, collecting titles on New England and Connecticut history.

In 1905, he was elected to the Connecticut House of Representatives, representing East Granby as a Republican.

== Personal life ==
Bates was born in 1865 to Carlos and Hannah Spencer (Powers) Bates. He graduated from Suffield Literary Institute in 1885 and was a farmer until 1891. He served in various positions in East Granby including Town Clerk and Town Treasurer. He married Alice Morgan Crocker in 1912. He died on March 27, 1954. His book collection was auctioned off after his death and brought in $15,000.

== Works ==
=== Books ===
- An Early Connecticut Engraver and His Work. Hartford, Connecticut: [The Case, Lockwood & Brainard Company], 1906.

=== Articles ===
- "Connecticut's Engraved Bills of Credit, 1709-1746". In Proceedings of the American Antiquarian Society. v. 46, p. 219-242. Worcester, Massachusetts, 1937.
- "The Expedition of Sir Edmund Andros to Connecticut in 1687". In Proceedings of the American Antiquarian Society. v. 48, p. 276-299. Worcester, Massachusetts, 1938.
