= James Hammond Trumbull =

American historian and politician

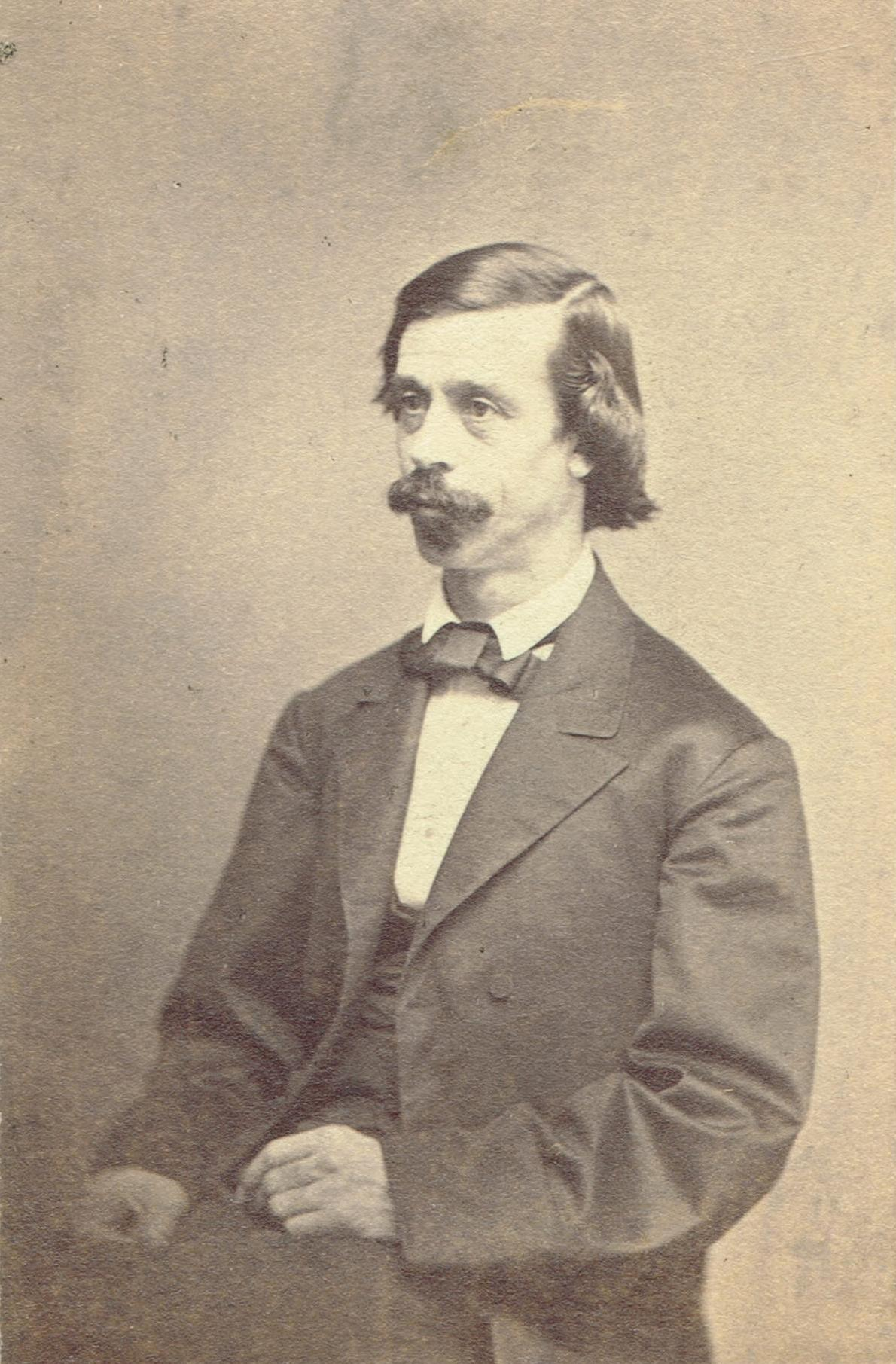

Connecticut State Librarian
- In office 1854
- Preceded by: None
- Succeeded by: Charles J. Hoadly

Secretary of the State of Connecticut
- In office 1861–1866
- Preceded by: John Boyd
- Succeeded by: Leverett E. Pease

Personal details
- Born: December 20, 1821 Stonington, Connecticut, US
- Died: August 5, 1897 (aged 75) Hartford, Connecticut
- Party: Republican
- Relations: Henry Clay Trumbull; Annie Trumbull Slosson; Annie Eliot Trumbull
- Education: Yale University
- Occupation: Historian, philologist, politician
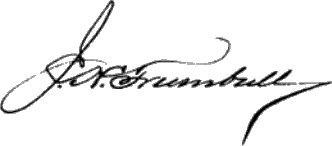
- Signature

James Hammond Trumbull (December 20, 1821 – August 5, 1897) was an American historian, philologist, bibliographer, and politician. A scholar of American Indian languages, he served as the first Connecticut State Librarian in 1854 and as Secretary of State from 1861 to 1866.

== Early life and education ==
Trumbull was born in Stonington, Connecticut, to parents Gurdon and Sarah Ann (Swan) Trumbull. His mother was descended from Stonington's first colonists; his father was a wealthy merchant and state legislator, distantly related to Governor Jonathan Trumbull. James Trumbull's siblings included clergyman and author Henry Clay Trumbull and entomologist and author Annie Trumbull Slosson. Trumbull studied at Tracy's Academy in Norwich and enrolled at Yale University in 1838. He never received his degree, withdrawing before the end of his junior year because of ill health.

Trumbull received an honorary Master of Arts degree from Yale in 1850 and an honorary LLD in 1871. He subsequently received an honorary Doctor of Laws degree from Harvard University and an honorary Doctor of Letters degree from Columbia University, both in 1887.

== Career ==
While at Yale, Trumbull developed a keen interest in natural history, particularly conchology. Joining the Yale Natural History Society, he collaborated with James Harvey Linsley to write and publish a three-volume catalog of Connecticut's fish, reptiles, and shellfish in 1844 and 1845.

In 1847, Trumbull moved to Hartford and became assistant secretary of state of Connecticut from 1847 to 1852. Becoming interested in local history, in 1852 he edited and published, at his own expense, the first volume of the Public Records of the Colony of Connecticut (1636-1689), followed two years later by a second volume and in 1859 by a third volume. Charles J. Hoadly subsequently edited the remaining twelve volumes in the series.

Trumbull was appointed as the first Connecticut State Librarian in 1854. Although he served for only one year before Hoadly assumed the office, he did much to organize the library and advocate for better funding. He served as assistant secretary of state again from 1858 to 1861 before winning consecutive annual elections to serve as Secretary of the State of Connecticut from 1861 to 1866. He was a member of the Republican Party.

Trumbull was a life member of the Connecticut Historical Society, having been elected to membership in 1847. He served as secretary from 1848 to 1863, president from 1863 to 1889, and librarian for its David Watkinson Library from 1863 to 1891 before becoming librarian emeritus until 1897. He was a founding member of the American Philological Association, of which he was elected treasurer in 1869, vice president in 1873, and president in 1874. He was a member of the American Association for the Advancement of Science and of the historical societies of Massachusetts, Maine, Rhode Island, New York, and Wisconsin. He was elected to the American Antiquarian Society in 1855 and the National Academy of Sciences in 1872.

== Writings ==
Trumbull was a prolific historian and bibliographer. He wrote extensively on the history of Connecticut, such as Historical Notes on some Provisions of the Connecticut Statutes (1860–1861), The True Blue Laws of Connecticut (1876), and The Memorial History of Hartford County (1886). He published numerous scholarly editions of writings by Roger Williams, Thomas Lechford, Abraham Pierson, John Eliot, and other historical figures. Between 1878 and 1893, he prepared a massive five-volume catalog for the auction of George Brinley's private book collection of 9500 titles.

Trumbull's contemporaries considered his knowledge of Native American philology second only to Daniel Garrison Brinton. His study of Algonquian languages led him to publish The Composition of Indian Geographical Names (1870), The Best Methods of Studying the Indian Languages (1871), Indian Names of Places in Connecticut (1881), and other works. Yale University appointed Trumbull a lecturer in Native American languages during the 1870s and 1880s, though the appointment came with no responsibilities and was largely honorary.

Trumbull's correspondence, manuscripts, notebooks, and other papers are held at the Connecticut History Society and at Yale University.

== Personal life ==
In April 1855, Trumbull married Sarah A. Robinson of Hartford. The couple traveled to Europe and Egypt for their honeymoon. Trumbull died of influenza (grippe) following a brief illness at his home in Hartford on August 5, 1897. He was 75 years old. He was survived by his wife and their only child, Annie Eliot Trumbull.

Political offices
Preceded by John Boyd	Secretary of the State of Connecticut; 1861–1866	Succeeded by Leverett E. Pease
