= Henry Clay Trumbull =

Union Army chaplain

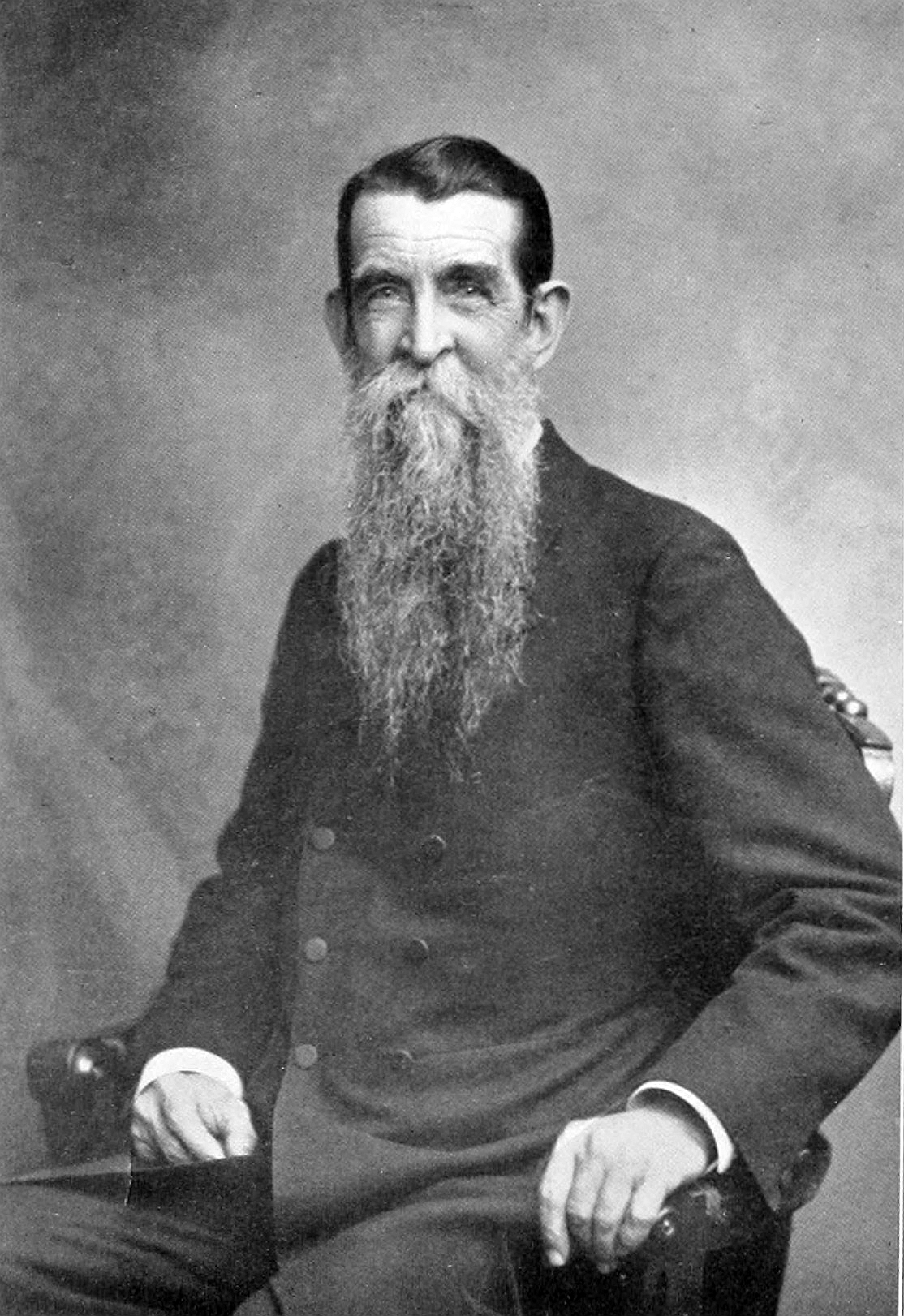
- Henry Trumbull
- Born: June 8, 1830; Stonington, Connecticut, U.S.
- Died: December 8, 1903 (aged 73); Philadelphia, Pennsylvania, U.S.
- Education: Williston Northampton School

Henry Clay Trumbull (June 8, 1830 – December 8, 1903) was an American clergyman and author. He became a world-famous editor, author, and pioneer of the Sunday School Movement.

== Early life ==
Henry Clay Trumbull was born on June 8, 1830, at Stonington, Connecticut, and educated at Williston Northampton School.

Poor health kept him from formal education past the age of fourteen. He was eventually awarded honorary degrees from Yale, Lafayette College and New York University.

== Early career ==
In 1851, at the age of 21, Trumbull had a religious conversion experience and found employment as a clerk in Hartford, Connecticut with the Hartford, Providence and Fishkill Railroad.

In 1852, Trumbull joined the Congregationalist church and, while continuing to work for the railroad, became the superintendent of a mission Sunday-school under the Connecticut State Sunday School Association.

In 1854, he married Alice Cogswell Gallaudet, the daughter of Thomas Hopkins Gallaudet, the founder of the American School for the Deaf. Alice was named in honor of Alice Cogswell, the daughter of Dr. Mason Cogswell and first deaf pupil of the American School for the Deaf. Gallaudet University, which specializes in the education of deaf persons, was founded by the elder Gallaudet's son, Edward Miner Gallaudet.

After trying a few different jobs, in 1858 Trumbull became the state Sunday-school missionary for Connecticut.

== Military service ==
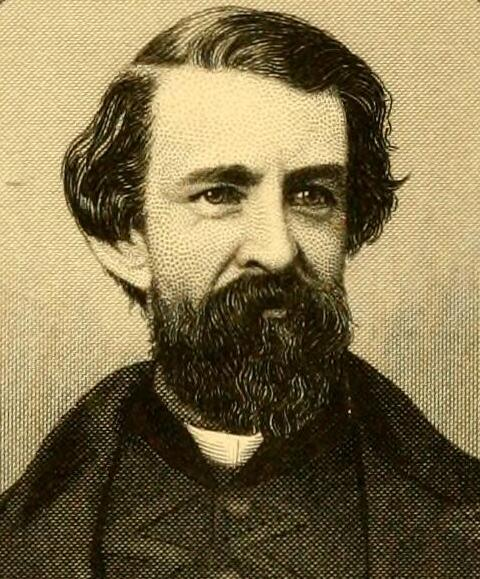
Trumbull during the Civil War

Trumbull was ordained a Congregational minister in 1862 and, shortly after, served as chaplain of the 10th Connecticut Infantry Regiment during the American Civil War. Trumbull was captured at the battle of Fort Wagner near Charleston, South Carolina on July 19, 1863. He was held in several Confederate prisons as a prisoner of war. After being exchanged on November 24, 1863, he rejoined the 10th Connecticut and served with that regiment until it was mustered out of service in August 1865.

In 1869, he became a companion of the Massachusetts Commandery of the Military Order of the Loyal Legion of the United States (MOLLUS) - a military society composed of officers who served in the Union armed forces during the Civil War. He was assigned MOLLUS insignia number 1001. In 1878 he transferred to the Pennsylvania Commandery where he served as Chaplain from 1878 to 1886 and as Junior Vice Commander from 1886 to 1887.

Trumbull was also active in the Grand Army of the Republic and a member of George G. Meade Post 1 of Philadelphia. He gave remarks welcoming former president and General Ulysses S. Grant on December 18, 1879.

== Later career ==
After his military service, Trumbull became New England secretary for the American Sunday-school Union. In 1875, he and his family moved to Philadelphia where he became editor of the Sunday School Times. He held this position until his death in 1903.

Upon moving to Philadelphia, he became a member of the Walnut Street Presbyterian Church. Among his associates was evangelist Dwight L. Moody.

In 1881 he travelled to Egypt and Judea to visit Biblical sites. While in Egypt he discovered what he believed to be Kadesh Barnea, which was the location of the camp of the children of Israel prior to their entry into the promised land. He was accompanied on this trip by Reverend Allen M. Dulles, the father of Secretary of State John Foster Dulles and CIA Director Allen Dulles.

In 1884, he was an elected as a member of the American Philosophical Society.

Trumbull was the Lyman Beecher Lecturer at Yale Divinity School in 1888. He was also the author of 38 books.

Trumbull was known for his commitment to "personal evangelism" which entailed telling friends and acquaintances about spiritual salvation through Christ's vicarious atonement. In this way, he was an early practitioner of modern-day Evangelical Christianity.

Trumbull died at his home at 4103 Walnut Street in Philadelphia on December 8, 1903, after suffering a stroke.

== Family ==
Trumbull was married to Alice Gallaudet (1833–1891), daughter of Thomas Hopkins Gallaudet. One of his brothers was James Hammond Trumbull, and one of his sisters was Annie Trumbull Slosson.

== Published works ==
- The Knightly Soldier (1865)
- Kadesh-Barnea (1883)
- Principles and Practices (1889)
- Hints on Child Training (1890)
- A Lie Never Justifiable, A Study in Ethics (1893)
- Studies in Oriental Social Life (1894)
- The threshold covenant or the beginning of religious rites (1896)
- War Memories of an Army Chaplain (1898)
- Individual Work for Individuals (1901)
- Old-Time Student Volunteers (1902)
- Personal Prayer, posthumously presented (1915)
- Prayer, Its Nature and Scope (1896)
- The Blood Covenant
- The Salt Covenant
- Trumball, Henry Clay (1891). Friendship: The Master-Passion or The Nature and History of Friendship, and Its Place as a Force in the World, first printing of new edition (2005), Solid Ground Christian Books, Birmingham, AL USA, Introductory Essay by Maurice Roberts ISBN 1-59925-030-6
- Duty-Knowing and Duty-Doing (1889) John D. Wattles, Publisher
