= Chu-Chin-Chow =

Chu-Chin-Chow may refer to:

- Chu Chin Chow, a 1916 musical play by Frederick Norton and Oscar Asche
- Chu-Chin-Chow (1923 film), a silent film adaptation of the musical directed by Herbert Wilcox
- Chu Chin Chow (1934 film), an adaptation of the musical directed by Walter Forde
