= Tip Toes =

1927 film

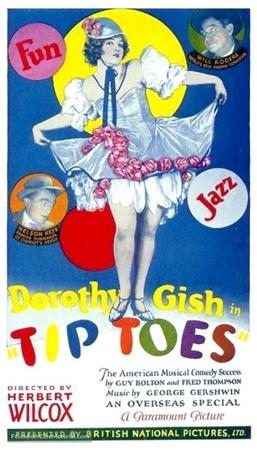
- Directed by: Herbert Wilcox
- Written by: Guy Bolton (play); Fred Thompson (play)
- Produced by: Herbert Wilcox
- Starring: Dorothy Gish; Will Rogers
- Cinematography: Roy Overbaugh
- Production company: British National Films
- Distributed by: Paramount Pictures
- Release date: 19 June 1927 (U.S.)
- Country: United Kingdom
- Languages: Silent film English intertitles
- Budget: £54,000

Tip Toes is a 1927 British silent film comedy-drama, directed by Herbert Wilcox and starring Dorothy Gish and Will Rogers. The film is a loose adaptation of the stage musical Tip-Toes, with the action transferred from Florida to London.

== Plot ==
Tip Toes and her two partners Uncle Hen and Al have a struggling music-hall act. When they go for auditions, theatre managers are keen on Tip Toes as a solo, but do not want the men. Tip Toes turns down offers to go it alone out of loyalty to her fellows. In deep financial trouble, they decide as a last throw of the dice to book into a suite at a high-class hotel and put the story about that Tip Toes is a sophisticated heiress, while she tries to snag a wealthy gentleman. Tip Toes attracts the interest of a young peer, but the plans of the trio are constantly on the point of being undermined as Hen and Al get into a series of scrapes.

== Cast ==
- Dorothy Gish as Tip Toes Kaye
- Will Rogers as Uncle Hen Kaye
- Nelson Keys as Al Kaye
- Miles Mander as Rollo Stevens
- Dennis Hoey as Hotelier
- John Manners as Lord William Montgomery

== Production ==
A writer was paid £2,000 for a script, but Wilcox threw it out. Paramount contributed only £20,000 of the production cost.

== Reception ==
Tip Toes was the last in a four-picture deal between Wilcox and Paramount to star Gish in British films. The earlier films (Nell Gwyn, London and Madame Pompadour) had all been relatively favourably received by contemporary critics; however, Tip Toes appears to have attracted almost universally negative responses. The Bioscope dismissed it as "feeble", while Variety accused the film of being "not only a libel on Americans, but on American vaudeville and its artists".

The film lost money.

== Preservation status ==
No print of Tip Toes is known to survive, and the British Film Institute include it on their '"75 Most Wanted" list of missing British feature films. It is considered of great potential interest to silent cinema historians, not only as a prestige production involving star names, but to assess whether it really was a disastrous misfire justifying its terrible reception, or whether a modern perspective would view the film more kindly.
