= Mumsie (play) =

1920 play

- Written by: Edward Knoblock
- Original language: English
- Genre: War Drama

Premiere
- Date premiered: 24 February 1920
- Place premiered: Little Theatre, London

Mumsie or Mumsée is a 1920 play by the Anglo-American writer Edward Knoblock.

== Stage adaptation ==
It was first staged at the Little Theatre in London, lasting for a run of 38 performances from February 24 to March 27. It marked the reopening of the Little Theatre which had been damaged in an air raid in 1917. The original cast included Henry Kendall, Edna Best, Diana Hamilton, Cyril Raymond and Eva Moore.

== Film adaptation ==
In 1927 it was turned into a silent British film Mumsie directed by Herbert Wilcox and starring Herbert Marshall.

== Bibliography ==
- Wearing, J. P. The London Stage 1920-1929: A Calendar of Productions, Performers, and Personnel. p. 10 "Little". Rowman & Littlefield, 2014. ISBN 9780810893023
- Goble, Alan. The Complete Index to Literary Sources in Film. p. 264 "Knoblock" and p. 877 "Mumsie". Walter de Gruyter, 1999. ISBN 9783110951943
