= Decameron Nights (1924 film) =

1924 British film by Herbert Wilcox

- Directed by: Herbert Wilcox
- Written by: Giovanni Boccaccio (literary work); Robert McLoughlin; Boyle Lawrence; Noel Rhys; Herbert Wilcox
- Produced by: Erich Pommer; Herbert Wilcox
- Starring: Lionel Barrymore; Ivy Duke; Werner Krauss; Bernhard Goetzke
- Cinematography: Theodor Sparkuhl
- Music by: Giuseppe Becce
- Production companies: Graham-Wilcox Productions; UFA
- Distributed by: Decla-Film; UFA (US)
- Release date: 1 September 1924
- Countries: Weimar Republic; United Kingdom
- Language: English

Decameron Nights is a 1924 British-German silent drama film directed by Herbert Wilcox and starring Lionel Barrymore, Ivy Duke and Werner Krauss. It is based on the Decameron, a fourteenth-century collection of tales by Giovanni Boccaccio.

== Cast ==
- Lionel Barrymore as Saladin
- Ivy Duke as Perdita
- Werner Krauss as Soldan
- Bernhard Goetzke as Torello
- Randle Ayrton as Ricciardo
- Xenia Desni as Lady Teodora
- Jameson Thomas as Imliff
- Hanna Ralph as Lady Violante
- Albert Steinrück as King Algarve

== Production ==
Herbert Wilcox had previously made Chu Chin Chow in Germany with Eric Pommer. Pommer invited Wilcox back to make another film. UFA would provide the story, screenplay and cast plus 50% of the finance. Wilcox would produce and direct, bring in American and British stars and 50% of the finance. Wilcox signed Ivy Duke from Britain and Lionel Barrymore from the US. They arrived in Berlin a few days before filming was to start. Wilcox loved the sets and the story but felt the script "stank to high heaven". Wilcox would only proceed if they could move forward without a script and write scenes from day to day.

== Critical reception ==
Wilcox later wrote that "I got through the film on schedule, and whatever faults could be found with Decameron Nights they were not in the screenplay or continuity. The critical acclaim was extraordinary and in my view out of proportion to the merits of the film."

In The New York Times, Mordaunt Hall wrote, "Decameron Nights, as it comes to the screen, is a tedious pictorial story with some good scenic effects and at least two good performances. The whole subject, however, lacks any suggestion of dramatic value, and one may therefore find time to ponder on many things that are not in the least connected with the picture...Werner Krauss figures as the Soldan and Lionel Barrymore plays the Soldan's son, Saladin. The narrative includes a slothful account of the Soldan's wish, or, rather, his command, that Saladin marry the daughter of the King of Algrave. Saladin, who, although he is begemmed and turbaned, does very much the same thing that sons do in this day—he falls in love with another girl, Perdita, and the old Soldan is so furious that, after kissing his son, he stabs the young man. And that ends the yarn. Mr. Barrymore does what he is able in the circumstances, but his work is not brilliant. Mr. Krauss acts exceedingly well, but most of his manoeuvrings are far from interesting."
