= Limelight (1936 film) =

- Poster ad from the Sunday Mercury, 1936
- Directed by: Herbert Wilcox
- Written by: Laura Whetter
- Produced by: Herbert Wilcox
- Starring: Arthur Tracy; Anna Neagle; Jane Winton; Ellis Jeffreys
- Cinematography: Freddie Young
- Music by: Geraldo
- Production company: British and Dominions
- Distributed by: General Film Distributors
- Release date: January 1936
- Running time: 80 minutes
- Country: United Kingdom
- Language: English

Limelight is a 1936 British musical film directed by Herbert Wilcox and starring Arthur Tracy, Anna Neagle and Jane Winton. It was released in the U.S. as Backstage.

== Plot ==
When chorus girl Marjorie (Anna Neagle) discovers singer Bob (Arthur Tracy) busking in the streets, and the star of her show falls ill, she persuades her producer to give him a break. Sure enough, Bob becomes an overnight sensation, but success unfortunately goes to his head.

== Cast ==
- Arthur Tracy as Bob Grant
- Anna Neagle as Marjorie Kaye
- Jane Winton as Ray Madison
- Ellis Jeffreys as Lady Madeleine
- Muriel George as Mrs. Kaye
- Alexander Field as Alf Sparks
- Anthony Holles as Impresario
- William Freshman as Joe
- Helena Pickard as Pixie
- Queenie Leonard as Queenie
- Ralph Reader as Ralph
- Tilly Losch as Dancer
- W. MacQueen Pope as Press Representative
- Ronald Shiner as Asst. Stage Manager
- Andreas Malandrinos as Singer

== Production ==
The film was the first made by Wilcox's independent production company, Herbert Wilcox Productions, at his Elstree Studios. It was distributed by J. Arthur Rank's newly formed General Film Distributors, ending a previous arrangement Wilcox had with United Artists. The story was based on Anna Neagle's "discovery" by Wilcox when singing in a show with Jack Buchanan' Buchanan agreed to play a role based on himself. The film was known as Street Singer's Serenade. Another early title announced was The Street Singer.

The film was an attempt to make a more populist contemporary hit, moving away from the more expensive costume pictures such as Nell Gwynn and Peg of Old Drury which Wilcox had recently made starring Anna Neagle. For this film Wilcox partnered her with the popular American singer Arthur Tracy.

This drama musical romance features Arthur Tracy's street singing. The film's Dance Director was Ralph Reader. His work was so appreciated by Herbert Wilcox that he created a part for Reader to dance with Neagle in the actual film.

== Critical reception ==
Allmovie wrote, "in addition to the two stars, Limelight is enlivened by the dancing prowess of the legendary Tilly Losch; also showing up for an uncredited cameo is stage and screen luminary Jack Buchanan.

== Bibliography ==
- Low, Rachael. Filmmaking in 1930s Britain. George Allen & Unwin, 1985.
- Wood, Linda. British Films, 1927-1939. British Film Institute, 1986.
