= The Rat (1937 film) =

1937 film directed by Jack Raymond

- Directed by: Jack Raymond
- Written by: Hans Rameau (as Hans Gulder Rameau); Romney Brent; Marjorie Gaffney; Miles Malleson (dialogue)
- Based on: the play by Ivor Novello & Constance Collier
- Produced by: Herbert Wilcox
- Starring: Ruth Chatterton; Anton Walbrook
- Cinematography: Freddie Young (as F.A. Young)
- Edited by: Peggy Hennessey
- Music by: Anthony Collins
- Production company: Herbert Wilcox Productions
- Distributed by: RKO Radio Pictures (UK)
- Release date: 10 November 1937 (London)
- Running time: 72 minutes
- Country: United Kingdom
- Language: English

The Rat is a 1937 British drama film directed by Jack Raymond and starring Anton Walbrook, Ruth Chatterton, and René Ray. It was written by Hans Rameau (as Hans Gulder Rameau), Romney Brent, Marjorie Gaffney and Miles Malleson based on the 1924 play The Rat by Ivor Novello which had previously been made into the 1925 film The Rat starring Novello. It was made at Denham Studios by Herbert Wilcox Productions.

== Plot ==
Infamous Parisian jewel thief Jean Boucheron, known as 'the Rat', attracts the fancy of socialite Zelia de Chaumont, mistress of a South American millionaire. She intends to reform 'the Rat', but he's only interested in relieving her of her pearls.

== Cast ==
- Anton Walbrook as Jean Boucheron, 'the Rat'
- Ruth Chatterton as Zelia de Chaumont
- René Ray as Odile Verdier
- Beatrix Lehmann as Marguerite
- Mary Clare as Mere Colline
- Felix Aylmer as Prosecuting Counsel
- Hugh Miller as Luis Stets
- Gordon McLeod as Caillard
- Frederick Culley as Judge
- Nadine March as Rose
- George Merritt Pierre Verdier
- Leo Genn as Defending Counsel
- Fanny Wright as Therese
- Bob Gregory as Albert
- Ivan Wilmot as Peter
- J.H. Roberts as Butler
- Aubrey Mallalieu as the jeweller
- Katie Johnson as the nun in the cell

== Reception ==
=== Box office ===
Kinematograph Weekly reported the film as a "surprise turn up" at the British box office in March 1938.

=== Critical ===
The Monthly Film Bulletin wrote: "This is an unpretentious film, well directed and photgraphed and with only one weakness, namely that the Rat's love for Odile is not sufficiently brought out until the end. The atmosphere and settings are convincing and effective, while the acting is outstanding."

The Daily Film Renter wrote: "Realistic court room scenes pack engrossing footage, romantic development has idyllic quality, and Paris settings are picturesquely squalid. Anton Walbrook gives compelling study in title role, competently backed by Ruth Chatterton, who makes British debut as wealthy woman admirer. Reliable type of popular entertainment."
