= Hell in the Heavens =

1934 film by John G. Blystone

- Theatrical release poster
- Directed by: John G. Blystone
- Screenplay by: Byron Morgan (screenplay); Ted Parsons (screenplay); Jack Yellen(additional dialogue); Ferdinand Reyher (contributor to screenplay construction) (uncredited); Herman Rossman (play) (as Hermann Rossmann); Marcel Silver (additional French dialogue) (uncredited); Frank Wead (contributor to screenplay construction) (uncredited); Reginald Berkeley (contributor to treatment) (uncredited); Joe Cunningham (contributor to special sequences: prologue and epilogue) (uncredited)
- Produced by: Al Rockett
- Starring: Warner Baxter; Conchita Montenegro; Russell Hardie; Herbert Mundin; Andy Devine; William Stelling
- Cinematography: Bert Glennon
- Edited by: Margaret Clancey
- Music by: Louis De Francesco
- Production company: Fox Film Corporation
- Distributed by: Fox Film Corporation
- Release date: November 9, 1934
- Running time: 79 minutes
- Country: United States
- Language: English

Hell in the Heavens is a 1934 American aviation drama film directed by John G. Blystone and written by Byron Morgan, Ted Parsons and Jack Yellen based on the stage play Der Flieger by Hermann Roßmann. The film stars Warner Baxter, Conchita Montenegro, Russell Hardie, Herbert Mundin, Andy Devine and William Stelling. It was released on November 9, 1934 by Fox Film Corporation.

== Plot ==
During World War I, American ace pilot Lieutenant Steve Warner leads a group of replacements for the French Lafayette Escadrille. Captain Andre DeLaage is in charge, but many of his pilots have been killed by the German ace known only as the Baron.

Steve falls in love with Aimee, a French girl. After a German air raid, the flyers keep the only bottle of bourbon, calling it the "bottle of death", to be used only to toast the downing of German pilots. During a morning air patrol, DeLaage is hit by the Baron, who returns his helmet by parachute. Warner, now in command, vows to exact revenge on the Baron. He fells Schroeder, a German officer who tells him that the Baron already notched 32 kills. Corporal Teddy May has repeatedly retreated from battle because of disturbing dreams in which he becomes the Baron's next victim, and Steve has had similar dreams.

Steve proposes marriage to Aimee, but she is afraid for him. In a series of aerial battles, Steve fells the Baron's younger brother while the Baron hits May and issues a challenge to Steve. Despite Aimee's pleas, Steve flies alone, and during a dogfight with the Baron, Steve's guns jam but he drives his aircraft into that of the Baron, crashing both of their planes. Steve drags the Baron to safety and proposes that they drink a toast from the "bottle of death." Steve is surprised to hear that the Baron also has had dreams of dying.

== Cast ==
- Warner Baxter as Lt. Steve Warner
- Conchita Montenegro as Aimee
- Russell Hardie as 2nd Lt. Hartley
- Herbert Mundin as Granny Biggs
- Andy Devine as Sgt. "Ham" Davis
- William Stelling as Cpl. Teddy May
- Ralph Morgan as Lt. "Pop" Roget
- Vince Barnett as Ace McGurk
- William Stack as Capt. Andre De Laage
- J. Carrol Naish as Sgt. Chevalier
- Johnny Arthur as Clarence Perkins
- Arno Frey as Baron Kurt von Hagen
- Rudolph Anders as Lt. Schroeder
- Vincent Carato as Sgt. Cortez

== Production ==
Hell in the Heavens was based on the 1931 stage play Flieger by Hermann Roßman and the 1933 English-language adaptation The Ace by Miles Malleson. In adapting the play, Fox agreed to avoid any changes that "shall in tone or form discredit the honour of Germany." Screenwriter Byron Morgan stated that the play was based on the experiences of officers and men in a German flying squadron and those of his cowriter Ted Parsons, who had been a member of the Lafayette Escadrille. The introduction of a new comic character, Sgt. Ham Davis, was the only major departure from the tone of the original play. A great number of screenwriters were involved, including Frank "Spig" Wead, a noted aviation writer who had been involved in many productions during the 1930s.

Most of the location photography was performed at Baker's Ranch in Santa Clarita, California. One of the major locales was a castle at the Fussell Brothers Ranch in Thousand Oaks, California.

Some stock footage from Hell's Angels (1930) was integrated into the film.

The aircraft shown in the film includes Nieuport 28 and Garland-Lincoln LF-1 fighter aircraft. (Note: Garland-Lincoln LF-1, Model N12237 was featured in Hell in the Heavens (1934), Dawn Patrol (1938), and Men with Wings (1938). It was later used by Frank Tallman and Paul Mantz in other film and television work.) (Note: Garland Lincoln, pilot and aircraft designer was retained as a technical assistant for Hell in the Heavens.)

== Reception ==
In a contemporary review for The New York Times, critic Frank Nugent wrote: "Acting on the assumption that there's always room for one more—a slogan credited locally to Times Square subway guards—Fox Film has turned out another picture about the Lafayette Escadrille. ... [T]he theme has been worked to death by Hollywood. After all, there are not many things a war flier can do. He can be a hero or a coward; he can bring down an enemy plane and dream at night that he is falling in flame; he can get drunk and give vent to his tortured nerves; he can fall in love; he can find himself at last and, by shooting down the German raider, discover from him that an enemy soul can be harrowed by the same feelings that burn within his own. To its credit, 'Hell in the Heavens' finds a way of using almost each of these possibilities and does it in a manner that holds one's interest most of the time. ... In brief, the film is good of its kind; but its kind, in this corner at least, has outworn its welcome."

== See also ==
- List of American films of 1934
