= Yellow Canary (film) =

1943 film by Herbert Wilcox

- Theatrical poster
- Directed by: Herbert Wilcox
- Written by: P. M. Bower; Miles Malleson; DeWitt Bodeen
- Produced by: Herbert Wilcox
- Starring: Anna Neagle; Richard Greene; Albert Lieven
- Cinematography: Mutz Greenbaum
- Edited by: Vera Campbell
- Music by: Clifton Parker
- Production company: Herbert Wilcox Productions
- Distributed by: RKO Radio Pictures
- Release dates: 19 October 1943 (Premiere-London); 13 April 1944 (U.S.)
- Running time: 95 minutes (UK) (also given as 98 minutes); 84 minutes, edited (U.S.)
- Country: United Kingdom
- Language: English

Yellow Canary is a 1943 British drama film directed by Herbert Wilcox and starring Anna Neagle, Richard Greene and Albert Lieven. Neagle plays a British Nazi sympathiser who travels to Halifax, Canada, trailed by spies from both sides during the Second World War. Neagle and director/producer Wilcox collaborated on a number of previous film projects.

== Plot ==
In the Second World War, Sally Maitland appears to signal Nazi planes during a bombing raid over London, after murdering an innocent citizen in his home. The next morning, she boards a ship bound for Canada. Two of her fellow passengers, Jim Garrick and Polish officer Jan Orlock, seek her acquaintance, despite her long-time and well-known admiration for Nazi Germany. It soon becomes common knowledge that Jim is a British intelligence officer and Sally rebuffs his advances, whilst welcoming Jan's attention. Sally is, in fact, a deep cover British agent on a secret mission to shadow Jan. Unbeknownst to Sally, Jim has been assigned to help and protect her.

The ship is stopped in mid-ocean by the German heavy cruiser Prinz Eugen, and a boarding party takes Jim prisoner. To the puzzlement of the ship's captain, the cruiser allows the ship to continue on its way. It turns out that the Germans have captured an impostor, when Jim emerges from hiding.

When they reach Halifax, Nova Scotia, Jan introduces Sally to his invalid mother, Madame Orlock. Jim uses his contacts to have Sally appear to be a true Nazi sympathiser, by having Canadian government men expose her and warn the Orlocks of her Nazi leanings. Sally pretends to try to break off their relationship to avoid trouble for them.

Jan reveals that he is working for the Nazis and recruits Sally into his spy ring. Sally has been waiting for this chance to find out who his fellow conspirators are, especially their leader. To Sally's surprise, the leader turns out to be Madame Orlock, who is not Jan's mother and is not an invalid. The others are people she met at her hotel (who have been covertly observing her), and even include a port immigration officer. The leader reveals that one of the ships of an incoming convoy has been secretly replaced by another filled with explosives, which is to be detonated when they reach Halifax, wrecking the vital port; a plan inspired by a devastating accident of the First World War.

At this point, Jan reveals he is anxious to make up for a recent bungled secret mission to bomb British royalty which failed due to his contact man sending incorrect landmark signals to the bombers. This explains the opening sequence: Sally killed the Nazi agent and thwarted that mission. Sally finally learns that Jim is assigned to her, when she catches him breaking into Jan's study to try to uncover evidence, just as she has.

Later, after being caught unawares when Orlock sneaks into her room, she thinks fast to explain her friendliness to Jim. Orlock believes she is a double agent, but she claims she is tricking the enemy and avoids being summarily executed. She then slips Jim a note written in lipstick advising him to wait at headquarters for information and heads off with Orlock.

Orlock orders Sally to telephone Jim and tell him that an attempt will be made to sabotage the Queen Mary, scheduled to sail later that night, and that all available agents should be immediately sent to stop it. Sally is able to warn Naval Intelligence of the actual plot and RCMP officers are dispatched to the house, while RCAF bombers are sent to bomb and destroy the ship. Jan shoots Sally before Jim can rescue her, but the bullet is stopped by a cigarette case which he gave to her earlier.

Sally and Jim are married and with Sally's cover now blown, they return to London to meet her family.

== Cast ==
As appearing in Yellow Canary, (main roles and screen credits identified):

- Anna Neagle as Sally Maitland
- Richard Greene as Lieutenant Commander Jim Garrick
- Albert Lieven as Jan Orlock
- Lucie Mannheim as Madame Orlock
- Nova Pilbeam as Betty Maitland
- George Thorpe as Colonel Charles Hargraves
- Marjorie Fielding as Lady Maitland
- Franklin Dyall as Captain Foster
- Valentine Dyall as officer on German cruiser [Prinz Eugen ?]
- Margaret Rutherford as Mrs. Towcester
- Aubrey Mallalieu as Reynolds
- Sybille Binder as Madame Orlock's Attendant

== Production ==
Although never identified as Unity Mitford, the central character played by Neagle has some obvious similarities to the pro-Nazi British dilettante who had a great deal of notoriety in pre-war times. In production during 1943, while the United Kingdom was still fearful of Nazi spies, Yellow Canary was obviously made as wartime propaganda, with the aim to keep up morale and also warn the British public to be on their guard.

Co-stars Richard Greene and Margaret Rutherford both went on to further success and Rutherford was especially adept at scene-stealing in Yellow Canary. Greene was in the armed forces at this time and had interrupted his successful acting career to serve in the Second World War in the 27th Lancers, where he distinguished himself. After three months, he went to Sandhurst and was commissioned. He was promoted to captain in the 27th Lancers in May 1944. He was relieved from duty in 1942 to appear in the British propaganda films Flying Fortress and Unpublished Story. In 1943, Greene appeared in Yellow Canary while on furlough.

Although set aboard a ship in the early scenes, the majority of the principal photography for Yellow Canary took place at the massive lots at Denham Film Studios (D&P Studios), located near the village of Denham, Buckinghamshire. All of the location sequences of Halifax were strictly "B" roll, but did provide a realistic, "atmospheric" look at wartime conditions in the busy Canadian military and civilian port.

After production had wrapped, Neagle and Wilcox made their professional relationship a personal one as well when they married on 9 August 1943.

== Reception ==
The leading actors in Yellow Canary were well received by critics. The New York Times reviewer (T.M.P.) found the storyline convoluted, concluding: "The Yellow Canary" lacks the plausibility necessary for drama, as it does the tension required by a good action picture.“ A 2006 review—the only one on Rotten Tomatoes—is more favourable, calling it “ A better-than-average wartime melodrama.,” and commenting on the production values and acting as "better-than-average."
