= The Man Who Wouldn't Talk (1958 film) =

British film by Herbert Wilcox

- UK 1-sheet poster
- Directed by: Herbert Wilcox
- Written by: Edgar Lustgarten
- Story by: Stanley Jackson
- Produced by: Herbert Wilcox
- Starring: Anna Neagle; Anthony Quayle; Zsa Zsa Gabor
- Cinematography: Gordon Dines
- Edited by: Basil Warren
- Music by: Stanley Black
- Production company: Herbert Wilcox Productions (as Wilcox-Neagle)
- Distributed by: British Lion Film Corporation (UK)
- Release date: 21 January 1958 (UK)
- Running time: 97 minutes
- Country: United Kingdom
- Language: English
- Budget: £127,582

The Man Who Wouldn't Talk is a 1958 British drama film directed by Herbert Wilcox, starring Anna Neagle, Anthony Quayle, Zsa Zsa Gabor, Dora Bryan, John Le Mesurier and Lloyd Lamble. It was written by Edgar Lustgarten from a story by Stanley Jackson.

== Plot ==
A courtroom drama, it sees an American scientist charged by the British police for his supposed role in the death of a secret agent who had been posing as his wife.

== Cast ==
- Anna Neagle as Mary Randall, Q.C.
- Anthony Quayle as Frank Smith
- Zsa Zsa Gabor as Eve Trent
- Katherine Kath as Miss Delbeau
- Dora Bryan as telephonist
- Patrick Allen as Kennedy
- Hugh McDermott as Bernie
- Leonard Sachs as Professor Horvard
- Edward Lexy as Hobbs
- John Paul as Castle
- John Le Mesurier as judge
- Anthony Sharp as Baker
- Lloyd Lamble as Bellamy
- Cyril Chamberlain as liftman
- John Welsh as George Fraser
- Donald Churchill as Junior Barrister
- Richard Shaw as Inspector Barclay
- Gordon Whiting as Hart
- Ballard Berkeley as Court Clerk
- Diana King as Miss Jenkins
- Norman Mitchell as Policeman
- Steve Plytas as Anton

== Critical reception ==
The Monthly Film Bulletin wrote: "Coldly efficient in direction, the film suffers most from the lifelessness of the meticulous script. The attention given to legal procedure is, it must be admitted, exact and authoritative; but motivation is generally rather hazy, and the predicament of the central character is rather incredible. Anna Neagle is in fine form, however, as Britain's foremost Queen's Counsel, and carries off her big courtroom speech with impassioned determination."

TV Guide wrote, "the screenplay was written by writers well versed in litigation, so the courtroom scenes have a strong sense of realism. The performances are convincing, though marred by several characters who don't fit in the plot."

The Radio Times wrote, "courtroom dramas have an intrinsic appeal, and veteran producer/director Herbert Wilcox makes a moderately entertaining film out of this story in which Anthony Quayle's American scientist, accused of murder, refuses to testify in his own defence. Wilcox's wife, Anna Neagle, gives another of her great lady portraits as Britain's leading Queen's Counsel, demonstrating her deductive brilliance in spotting a bullet hole in a witness's window pane and her oratorical skills in a dramatic five-minute courtroom address."
