= Peggy Hennessey =

British film editor

- Occupation: Film editor
- Years active: 1937–1941

Peggy Hennessey was a British film editor active in the 1930s and 1940s.

== Biography ==
After starting out as an assistant at Ealing Studios, she made the lead to lead editor after successfully cutting a film for American director Al Parker in two days. In those early days, she learned from David Lean.

== Selected filmography ==
- You Will Remember (1941)
- The Gang (1938)
- Nobody Home (1938)
- A Royal Divorce (1938)
- The Rat (1937)
