= They Flew Alone =

- British DVD cover from 2010
- Directed by: Herbert Wilcox
- Screenplay by: Miles Malleson
- Story by: Viscount Castlerosse
- Produced by: Herbert Wilcox
- Starring: Anna Neagle; Robert Newton; Edward Chapman
- Cinematography: Mutz Greenbaum
- Edited by: Geoffrey Foot
- Music by: William Alwyn
- Production company: Herbert Wilcox Productions
- Distributed by: RKO Radio Pictures
- Release dates: 29 June 1942 (UK); 18 September 1942 (US)
- Running time: 103 minutes (UK); 94 minutes (US)
- Country: United Kingdom
- Language: English

They Flew Alone (released in the US as Wings and the Woman with 8 minutes cut out) is a 1942 British biopic about aviator Amy Johnson directed and produced by Herbert Wilcox and starring Anna Neagle, Robert Newton and Edward Chapman. It was distributed in the UK and the US by RKO Radio Pictures.

== Plot ==
The film chronicles the life of Amy Johnson, the British pilot who gained world attention in the 1930s for her exploits, among them two solo record flights from London to Cape Town in South Africa. She joined the Air Transport Auxiliary at the outbreak of the Second World War. It was intended to be both a film honouring Johnson, who had died in 1941 during a ferry flight of an Airspeed Oxford, and a propaganda call to arms at the height of the war years.

Although TCM summarizes the film as a romance between two fliers, much more time is spent on Johnson's accomplishments. The film begins with Johnson's demonstration of independence by refusing to wear the old-fashioned straw hat that goes with her school uniform, replacing it with a modern shape. The film concludes with Johnson's words from an inspiring speech she gives to young women earlier in the film. The voiceover plays behind her image and footage of thousands of women in the uniforms of Britain's various armed services, marching, and ending with women pilots of the ferry service, soaring.

== Cast ==
- Anna Neagle as Amy Johnson
- Robert Newton as Jim Mollison
- Edward Chapman as Mr. Johnson
- Nora Swinburne as ATA Commandant
- Joan Kemp-Welch as Mrs. Johnson
- Brefni O'Rorke as Mac
- Charles Carson as Lord Wakefield
- Martita Hunt as Miss Bland
- Anthony Shaw as Official
- Eliot Makeham as Mayor of Croydon
- David Horne as Solicitor
- Miles Malleson as Vacuum Salesman
- Aubrey Mallalieu as Bill, the Barber
- Charles Victor as Postmaster
- Hay Petrie as Old General
- John Slater as Officer on Interview Panel
- Percy Parsons as Man
- Cyril Smith as Radio Operator On RMS Aquitania
- George Merritt as Reporter
- Muriel George as Kitty, the Housekeeper
- Ian Fleming as Secretary
- William Hartnell as Scotty (as Billy Hartnell)
- Arthur Hambling as Policeman
- Peter Gawthorne as RAF Officer
- Ronald Shiner as mechanic at Stag Lane Aerodrome
- Samir Sabri as 1st Reporter (Uncredited)

== Production ==
The producers acknowledged: "the assistance and facilities accorded by Miss Amy Johnson's Family, Mr. James Mollison, Miss Pauline Gower M.B.E., The Air Ministry, The Ministry of Aircraft Production, The Air Transport Auxiliary, and Lord Wakefield's Representatives ."

In June 1942, when the film was released in the UK, theater audiences had survived the Blitz but were still suffering. It was barely 6 months since the United States had entered the war.

The picture closes with a dedication, all in capital letters: "And to all the Amy Johnsons of today, who have fought and won the battle of the straw hat—who have driven through centuries of convention—who have abandoned the slogan Safety First in the flight for freedom from fear—from persecution—we dedicate the following film."

MacDonald Parke's surname is incorrectly spelled "Park" in the screen credits.

Neagle uses a Yorkshire accent.
