= The Queen's Affair =

1934 British film by Herbert Wilcox

- Belgian poster
- Directed by: Herbert Wilcox
- Written by: Monckton Hoffe; Miles Malleson; Samson Raphaelson
- Based on: The operetta Die Königin by Ernst Marischka & Bruno Granichstaedten
- Produced by: Herbert Wilcox
- Starring: Anna Neagle; Fernand Gravey; Muriel Aked
- Cinematography: Freddie Young
- Edited by: Merrill G. White
- Music by: Oscar Straus; Roy Robertson
- Production company: British and Dominions
- Distributed by: United Artists
- Release date: February 1934
- Running time: 77 minutes
- Country: United Kingdom
- Language: English

The Queen's Affair is a 1934 British musical film directed by Herbert Wilcox and starring Anna Neagle, Fernand Gravey, Muriel Aked and Edward Chapman. An Eastern European President falls in love with the Queen whom he had previously deposed. It was also released as Queen's Affair and Runaway Queen.

It was made at British and Dominion Elstree Studios. The film's sets were designed by the art director Lawrence P. Williams. Gowns were designed by Doris Zinkeisen.

== Plot ==
Poor New York shop girl Nadina receives unexpected news of an inheritance, and learns she is next in line to be queen of an Eastern European country. On her arrival in Ruritania, a revolution is in progress, and only minutes before her coronation, Nadina is forced into exile. She flees to Paris with her nurse, and then travels on to Switzerland. There Nadina encounters the Ruritanian revolutionary leader Carl, recuperating from the trials of revolution, and the couple unexpectedly fall in love. When the revolution collapses in Ruritania, they return and marry, thus forming a constitutional monarchy supported by all the people.

== Cast ==
- Anna Neagle as Queen Nadina
- Fernand Gravey as Carl
- Muriel Aked as Marie Soubrekoff
- Miles Malleson as The Chancellor
- Gibb McLaughlin as General Korensky
- Michael Hogan as The Leader
- Stuart Robertson as Revolutionary
- Hay Petrie as Revolutionary
- Reginald Purdell as Soldier
- Edward Chapman as Soldier
- Clifford Heatherley as Diplomat
- David Burns as Manager
- Trefor Jones as Singer
- Arthur Chesney
- Dino Galvani
- Herbert Langley
- Helen Mardi
- Tarva Penna

== Critical reception ==
TV Guide wrote, "This average musical features a good star turn by Neagle, but the whole film looks awfully dated."

== Bibliography ==
- Low, Rachael. Filmmaking in 1930s Britain. George Allen & Unwin, 1985.
- Wood, Linda. British Films, 1927-1939. British Film Institute, 1986.
