= Herbert Langley =

English opera singer and actor (1888–1967)

- Langley (right) and Betty Blythe in Chu-Chin-Chow (1923)
- Born: Herbert George Langley; Q2 1888; Thanet, Kent, England
- Died: 13 September 1967 (aged 79); Haringey, Greater London, England
- Occupations: Opera singer Actor
- Children: Bryan Langley

Herbert George Langley (Q2 1888 – 13 September 1967) was a well-known early twentieth-century English opera singer (baritone) who later also played leading acting roles in a number of British silent films; and then smaller roles with the arrival of sound. He was the father of cinematographer Bryan Langley.

== Selected filmography ==
Year	Title	Role	Notes
1922	The Wonderful Story	Robert Martin	
1922	Flames of Passion	Arthur Watson	
1923	Chu-Chin-Chow	Abou Hassan	
1924	Southern Love	Pedro	
1927	Carmen		
1929	Cupid in Clover	John Simpson	
1932	Number Seventeen		
1933	Letting in the Sunshine	Foreman	
1934	The Queen's Affair		
1935	The Public Life of Henry the Ninth	Police Constable	
