= Gibb McLaughlin =

English actor (1879–1961)

- Born: George McLoughlin; 19 July 1879; Sunderland, County Durham, England
- Died: 30 June 1961 (aged 81); Kensington, London, England
- Occupation: Actor
- Years active: 1921–1959
- Spouse: Eleanor (Nellie) Morton

George McLoughlin (19 July 1879 – 30 June 1961), known professionally as Gibb McLaughlin, was an English film and stage actor.

== Early days ==
McLaughlin was born in Sunderland, County Durham, England in 1879. For about 10 years he was a salesman in Kingston-upon-Hull where he sang in the Holy Trinity Church choir. He joined the Hull Amateur Operatic Society and played the part of Koko in The Mikado. After that he appeared with Anne Croft in concerts and they had a turn to themselves on the stage of the Palace Theatre. He performed as a comedian and monologist in music halls. In 1915, McLaughlin married Eleanor Morton, youngest daughter of William Morton, formerly manager of the Egyptian Hall, London and the Greenwich Theatre.

== Film work ==
He appeared in 118 films between 1921 and 1959. He was known for The Lavender Hill Mob (1951), Oliver Twist (1948) and Hobson's Choice (1954). He had a rare leading role as the sleuth J. G. Reeder in Edgar Wallace's Mr Reeder in Room 13 (1938), released in the U.S. as Mystery of Room 13 (1941). A skeletal, lugubrious, latterly prune-faced, character actor, he was popular on screen as a master of disguise, which allowed him to slip into just about any ethnic part or Dickensian role.

== Partial filmography ==
- The Road to London (1921) - The Count
- The Pointing Finger (1922) - The Monk
- The Bohemian Girl (1922) - Captain Florenstein
- Three to One Against (1923) - Cleric
- Constant Hot Water (1923) - Eardley Adams
- The Kensington Mystery (1924)
- Odd Tricks (1924)
- The Only Way (1925) - Barsad
- Somebody's Darling (1925)
- Nell Gwyn (1926) - Duke of York
- London (1926) - Ah Kwang
- The House of Marney (1927) - Ezra
- Madame Pompadour (1927) - Comte Maurepas
- The Arcadians (1927) - Peter Doody
- Poppies of Flanders (1927) - Shorty Bill
- The White Sheik (1928) - Jock
- The Farmer's Wife (1928) - Henry Coaker
- Not Quite a Lady (1928) - The Vicar
- The Price of Divorce (1928) - The Valet
- Glorious Youth (1929)
- The Silent House (1929) - Chang Fu
- Power Over Men (1929) - Alexandre Billot
- Kitty (1929) - The Electrician
- Such Is the Law (1930) - Valet - from 'The Price of Divorce' (archive footage)
- The W Plan (1930) - Pvt. McTavish
- The Woman from China (1930) - Chung-Li
- The Nipper (1930) - Bill Henshaw
- The School for Scandal (1930) - William
- Third Time Lucky (1931) - Unidentified Role
- Sally in Our Alley (1931) - Jim Sears
- Jealousy (1931) - Littleton Pardmore
- Potiphar's Wife (1931) - Chauffeur (uncredited)
- Detective Lloyd (1932) - Abdul - and Egyptian
- Goodnight, Vienna (1932) - Max's Orderly
- The First Mrs. Fraser (1932) - Butler
- Congress Dances (1932) - Bibikoff
- White Face (1932) - Sgt. Elk
- The Love Contract (1932) - Hodge
- Money Means Nothing (1932) - Augustus Bethersyde
- Where Is This Lady? (1932) - Dr. Schilling
- The Mistress of Atlantis (1932) - Count Velovsky
- The Temperance Fete (1932) - Mr. Hearty
- King of the Ritz (1933) - Baron Popov
- Bitter Sweet (1933) - The Footman
- No Funny Business (1933) - Florey
- The Private Life of Henry VIII (1933) - The French Executioner
- Friday the Thirteenth (1933) - Florist
- The Thirteenth Candle (1933) - Captain Blythe
- High Finance (1933) - Sir Grant Rayburn
- Britannia of Billingsgate (1933) - Westerbrook
- Swinging the Lead (1934) - Inigo Larsen
- The Rise of Catherine the Great (1934) - Bestujhev
- The Queen's Affair (1934) - General Korensky
- Dick Turpin (1934) - Governor of Newgate
- Chu Chin Chow (1934) - The Caliph's Vizier
- The Church Mouse (1934) - Thomas Stubbings, Cashier
- Blossom Time (1934) - Bauernfeld
- Little Friend (1934) - Thompson
- There Goes Susie (1934) - Advertising Manager
- Jew Süss (1934) - Pancorgo (uncredited)
- The Iron Duke (1934) - Talleyrand
- The Old Curiosity Shop (1934) - Sampson Brass
- The Scarlet Pimpernel (1934) - The Barber
- The Dictator (1935)
- Drake of England (1935) - Don Enriquez
- Me and Marlborough (1935) - Old Soldier
- Bulldog Jack (1935) - Denny
- The Loves of Madame Dubarry (1935) - De Brissac
- Hyde Park Corner (1935) - Sir Arthur Gannett
- Two's Company (1936) - Toombs
- Broken Blossoms (1936) - Evil Eye
- Where There's a Will (1936) - Martin, The Butler
- Juggernaut (1936) - Jacques
- Irish for Luck (1936) - Thady
- Two's Company (1936)
- All In (1936) - Rev. Cuppleditch
- You Live and Learn (1937) - Mons. Duval
- Mr. Reeder in Room 13 (1938) - Mr. J.G. Reeder
- Break the News (1938) - The Superintendent
- Almost a Gentleman (1938) - Bartholomew Quist
- 13 Men and a Gun (1938) - Col. Vlatin
- Hold My Hand (1938) - Bank Manager
- Hey! Hey! USA (1938) - Ship's Steward
- Inspector Hornleigh (1939) - Alfred Cooper, Pheasant Inn Porter
- Come On George! (1939) - Dr. MacGregor
- Confidential Lady (1940) - Sheriff
- Spy for a Day (1940) - Col. Ludwig
- That's the Ticket (1940) - The Count
- Freedom Radio (1941) - Dr. Weiner
- Spellbound (AKA ' Passing Clouds '. Released as ' The Spell of Amy Nugent ', in USA)
- Penn of Pennsylvania (1942) - Indian Chief
- The First of the Few (1942) - Sir Ian MacLaren (uncredited)
- The Young Mr. Pitt (1942) - George Selwyn (uncredited)
- Much Too Shy (1942) - Rev. Sheepshanks
- Tomorrow We Live (1943) - Dupont
- My Learned Friend (1943) - Butler
- Champagne Charlie (1944) - Doctor at Duel (uncredited)
- Give Us the Moon (1944) - Marcel
- Caesar and Cleopatra (1945) - High Priest (uncredited)
- No Orchids for Miss Blandish (1948) - Butler (uncredited)
- Oliver Twist (1948) - Mr. Sowerberry
- Once Upon a Dream (1949) - Mr. Pontefact I
- The Queen of Spades (1949) - Bird seller
- Night and the City (1950) - Googin the Forger (uncredited)
- The Black Rose (1950) - Wilderkin
- The Lavender Hill Mob (1951) - Godwin
- The House in the Square (1951) - Jacob (uncredited)
- The Card (1952) - Emery
- The Pickwick Papers (1952) - Foreman
- Top Secret (1952) - Schoolmaster
- The Man Who Watched Trains Go By (1952) - Julius de Koster, Sr
- Grand National Night (1953) - Morton
- The Million Pound Note (1954) - Sir William Collinge (uncredited)
- Hobson's Choice (1954) - Tudsbury
- The Brain Machine (1955) - Mr. Spencer Simon
- The Deep Blue Sea (1955) - Clerk
- The Man Who Never Was (1956) - Club Porter
- Who Done It? (1956) - Scientist
- Sea Wife (1957) - Club Porter
- The Naked Truth (1957) - Old Man in TV Show Audience (uncredited)
- Too Many Crooks (1959) - Vicar (uncredited)
