= Money Means Nothing (1932 film) =

1932 film

- Kay Hammond and Dorothy Robinson in the film
- Directed by: Herbert Wilcox
- Written by: Douglas Furber; Miles Malleson; Harcourt Templeman
- Produced by: Herbert Wilcox
- Starring: John Loder; Kay Hammond; Gibb McLaughlin
- Cinematography: Charles Van Enger
- Music by: Lew Stone
- Production company: British and Dominions Films
- Distributed by: Paramount British Pictures
- Release date: September 1932
- Running time: 70 minutes
- Country: United Kingdom
- Language: English

Money Means Nothing (also released as Butler's Millions) is a 1932 British comedy film directed by Herbert Wilcox and starring John Loder, Irene Richards and Miles Malleson. It was written by Douglas Furber, Miles Malleson and Harcourt Templeman, and was shot at Elstree Studios as a quota quickie for release by Paramount British.

== Preservation status ==
The British Film Institute National Archive holds a collection of ephemera and stills but no film or video materials.

== Synopsis ==
The screenplay concerns a butler who comes into some money through an inheritance, and turns the tables on his young master.

== Cast ==
- John Loder as Earl Egbert
- Irene Richards as Livia Faringay
- Gibb McLaughlin as Augustus Bethersyde
- A. Bromley Davenport as Earl of Massingham
- Kay Hammond as Angel
- Miles Malleson as doorman
- Dorothy Robinson as Daysie de Lille
- Clive Currie as Sir Percival Puttock
- Maidel Turner as Mrs. Kerry Green

== Reception ==
Film Weekly wrote: "Just a banal trifle about a faithful Jeeves who comes into a fortune and engineers a romance between his daughter and the young master. Gibb McLaughlin's drilyy unctious wit carries it along as well as possible, but it Is only mildly entertaining."

Picturegoer wrote: "Slowiy developed story, thin in plot, which contains some romantic appeal and popular humour."

Picture Show wrote: "Melodrama, comedy and sentiment are well mixed, and the cast is excellent."
