= Eliza Comes to Stay =

- Feature on the film from Picture Show (24 October 1936)
- Directed by: Henry Edwards
- Written by: Henry V. Esmond (play); H. Fowler Mear
- Produced by: Julius Hagen
- Starring: Betty Balfour; Seymour Hicks; Oscar Asche
- Cinematography: Sydney Blythe; William Luff
- Edited by: Michael C. Chorlton
- Music by: W.L. Trytel
- Production company: Julius Hagen Productions
- Distributed by: Twickenham Film Distributors
- Release date: 9 April 1936
- Running time: 75 minutes
- Country: United Kingdom
- Language: English

Eliza Comes to Stay (also known as Elisa Comes to Stay) is a 1936 British comedy film directed by Henry Edwards and starring Betty Balfour, Seymour Hicks and Oscar Asche. It was written by H. Fowler Mear adapted from the play by Henry V. Esmond, and made at the Riverside Studios in Hammersmith.

== Plot ==
Sandy Verrall, bachelor, becomes the guardian of Eliza Vandan, the daughter of a man who had saved his life. To provide a mother-figure for her, he proposes to actress Vera Laurance. Having believed Eliza to be a young child, he soon discovers she is actually a young woman. When Vera leaves Sandy, Eliza becomes his wife.

== Cast ==
- Betty Balfour as Eliza Vandan
- Seymour Hicks as Sandy Verrall
- Oscar Asche as Herbert, the butler
- Ellis Jeffreys as Lady Elizabeth
- Nelson Keys as Sir Gregory
- A.R. Whatmore as Monty Jordan
- Vera Bogetti as Vera Laurence
- Ben Webster
- Donald Burr
- Agnes Imlay
- Diana Ward
- Bill Worth

== Reception ==
The Monthly Film Bulletin wrote: "Had the story been supported in the film by a more versatile Eliza than Betty Balfour it would have seemed credible; but it remains a stage farce. In one of his last roles the late Oscar Asche is a superb butler. All the minor parts are played with distinction, and in spite of a tame ending, there remains the feeling of a light-hearted hour well spent. This is largely due to the infectious enthusiasm and polish of Seymour Hicks, as the bachelor. He makes the old-fashioned double-entendre live again."

Kine Weekly wrote: "Old-fashioned, commonplace farcical comedy, too far behind the times in its humour, trite in its dialogue, and colourless in its interpretation to appeal to other than very unsophisticated audiences. The entertainment belongs to a bygone age and crumples at the misguided attempt at resuscitation."

The Daily Film Renter wrote: "Developed with overplus of dialogue, and stagy in presentation, this hardly affords cast much opportunity, sole entertainment deriving from main situation. ... Sir Seymour Hicks, in the character of Sandy, hardly achieves conviction, and relies too much on stage technique."
