= Chu-Chin-Chow (1923 film) =

1923 film

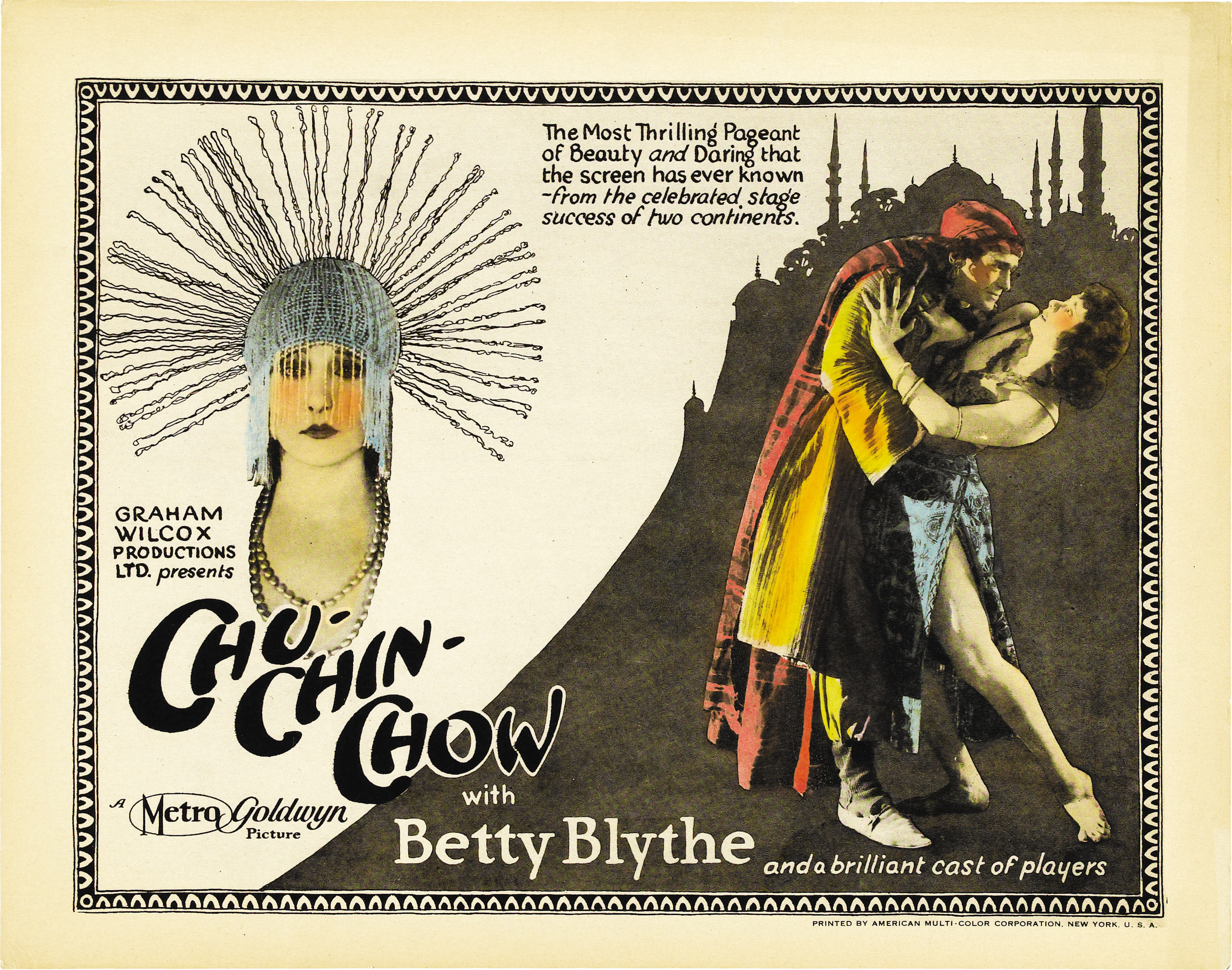
- Directed by: Herbert Wilcox
- Written by: Herbert Wilcox (scenario)
- Based on: Chu Chin Chow by Oscar Asche
- Produced by: Herbert Wilcox; John Hagenbeck-Film; Micco-Film
- Starring: Betty Blythe
- Cinematography: René Guissart
- Music by: Frederic Norton (Chu Chin Chow)
- Distributed by: England 1923; *Graham-Wilcox productions USA February 1925; *Metro Goldwyn Mayer
- Release dates: 30 December 1923 (Finland); 7 July 1924 (Berlin); 10 February 1925 (New York, by MGM)
- Running time: European release: *3,733 meters *12,247 feet US release: *1,939 meters *6,362 feet
- Countries: Weimar Republic; United Kingdom
- Languages: Silent film (intertitles: German, Finnish, English)
- Budget: £40,000 or £100,000

Chu-Chin-Chow is a 1923 British-German silent adventure film directed by Herbert Wilcox and starring Betty Blythe, Herbert Langley, and Randle Ayrton.

== Plot ==
As described in a review in a film magazine, Abou Hassan and his forty thieves descend on a small Arabian town on the wedding day of Omar and the beautiful Zharat and kidnap them. Abou sells Zahrat to Kasim Baba, the miser and money lender of Bagdad, while posing as Prince Constantine. Later, Abou poses as the wealthy Chinese prince Chu-Chin-Chow, and bids on Zahrat when she is placed at auction. She pierces his disguise and exposes him. He robs the other bidders of their wealth and escapes with Zahrat. Promising that she will live among untold wealth, he sets her free. After she finds Omar, Abou takes them to his treasure cave, making good on his promise. Ali Baba, brother of Kasim, accidentally discovers the cave and helps himself to the treasure. He then goes for aid to free Zahrat. Kasim, led by his greed, also comes to the cave but is captured and killed by Abou. Zahrat, now free, returns to Bagdad. Ali Baba gives a great feast. Abou appears as a merchant with forty jugs of oil, in which are hidden his forty thieves. Zahrat discovers the deception and, assisted by a powerful slave, they get rid of the hidden thieves. Left alone, Abou is denounced and the multitude turn on him. Cornered, he is stabbed by Zahrat who then returns to her village and finds happiness with Omar.

== Cast ==
- Betty Blythe as Zahrat
- Herbert Langley as Abou Hassan
- Randle Ayrton as Kasim Baba
- Eva Moore as Alcolma
- Judd Green as Ali Baba
- Olaf Hytten as Mukhill
- Jeff Barlow as Mustafa
- Jameson Thomas as Omar
- Dora Levis as Mahbubah
- Dacia Dean as Dancer

== Production ==
The film is based on the stage musical Chu Chin Chow by Oscar Asche, with music by Frederic Norton, that ran in London from 1916 to 1921.

Wilcox had a box office success with Flames of Passion (1922) starring imported Hollywood actor Mae Marsh. This enabled him to raise the £20,000 to buy the film rights of the play, a record amount at the time. The cost of making the film was another £20,000.

To save money, Wilcox decided to make the film in Germany. In exchange, Wilcox agreed to distribute Die Nibelungen (1924) in Britain.

The film starred American actress Betty Blythe fresh from her scantily clad triumph in 1921's The Queen of Sheba at Fox. The film was shot in Berlin on the studio lot at Steglitz. Sources state this film had early experimental synchronised sound, but this process could only be viewed at the special theaters outfitted for the sound equipment.

Chu Chin Chow was released in the United States by MGM two years after its production with a drastically reduced footage, cut by almost half. This version had noticeable jumps that ruined the continuity of the story.

== Reception ==
Wilcox later said the film "was only a moderate success".

A sound film Chu Chin Chow, with the score intact, was made by the Gainsborough Studios in 1934, with George Robey playing the part of Ali Baba, Fritz Kortner as Abu Hassan, Anna May Wong as Zahrat Al-Kulub and Laurence Hanray as Kasim.

== Sources ==
- Wilcox, Herbert Sydney. Twenty-five Thousand Sunsets: The Autobiography of Herbert Wilcox, The Bodley Head: London (1967)
