= Henry V. Esmond =

British actor and playwright (1869–1922)

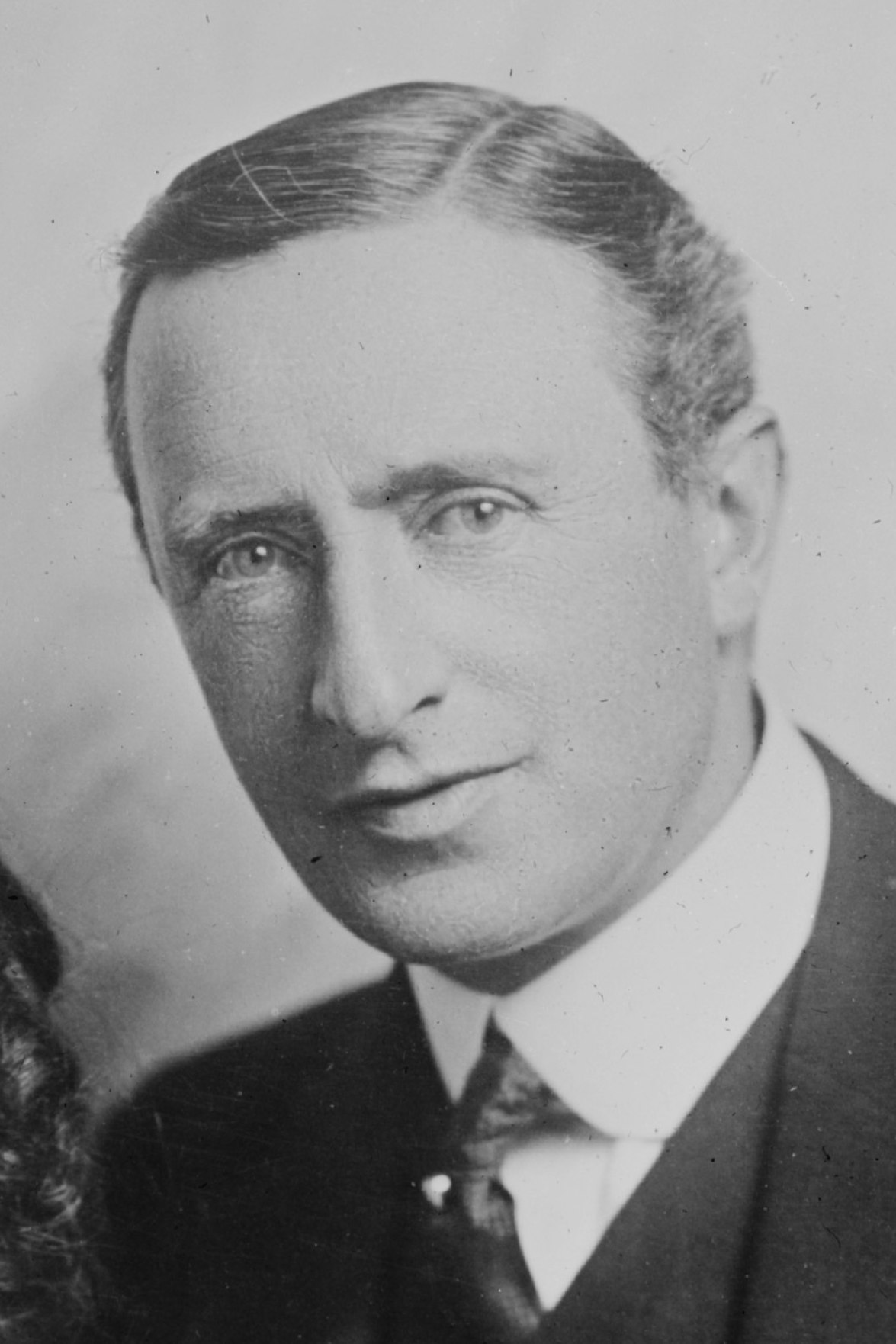
- Esmond in the 1910s
- Born: Harry Esmond Jack; 30 November 1869; England
- Died: 17 April 1922 (aged 52); Paris, France
- Occupations: Actor; playwright
- Spouse: Eva Moore (m. 1891)
- Children: 3, including Jill Esmond

Henry Vernon Esmond (30 November 1869 – 17 April 1922) was a British actor and playwright.

== Biography ==
Esmond was born Harry Esmond Jack in Hampton Court, Middlesex, the son of Richard George Jack, a physician and surgeon and his wife Mary Rynd. He was baptised on 22 February 1870 at the Church of St Mary, Hampton Court, Middlesex. He began his career as an actor in London in 1889 where he had several successes in comedies. He began writing plays, usually comedies, while in his early twenties. These plays were very popular and were also highly fashionable with their themes of light-hearted romance appealing to the audience of the day. He toured with a number of these plays and co-starred in them with his wife, Eva Moore.

His plays were also well received in the United States where nine of them were produced on Broadway between 1899 and 1907. For the next Broadway production, Eliza Comes to Stay, Esmond travelled to New York to appear alongside his wife and the popular actor Leslie Banks. This proved to be the greatest success of his career. He continued writing, acting and touring until his sudden death in Paris caused by pneumonia. He is buried in the Old Cemetery of Saint-Germain-en-Laye near Paris.

He was the father of three, the youngest of whom was actress Jill Esmond, first wife of Laurence Olivier.
