= Victoria the Great =

- Directed by: Herbert Wilcox
- Written by: Miles Malleson; Charles de Grand
- Produced by: Herbert Wilcox
- Starring: Anna Neagle; Anton Walbrook; Walter Rilla; H.B. Warner; Mary Morris
- Cinematography: William V. Skall; Freddie Young
- Edited by: Jill Irving
- Music by: Anthony Collins
- Production company: Imperator Film Productions
- Distributed by: RKO Radio Pictures
- Release date: 16 September 1937 (UK)
- Running time: 112 min
- Country: United Kingdom
- Language: English
- Budget: £150,000

Victoria the Great is a 1937 British historical film directed by Herbert Wilcox and starring Anna Neagle, Anton Walbrook and Walter Rilla. It was written by Miles Malleson and Charles de Grand. A sequel, Sixty Glorious Years, appeared the following year.

The film covers the early years of Queen Victoria's reign, her marriage to Prince Albert and her subsequent rule after Albert's death in 1861. It was released in the year of Victoria's great-grandson King George VI's coronation, which was also the centennial of Victoria's accession to the throne.

== Plot ==
In June 1837, 18-year-old Princess Alexandrina Victoria of Kent ascends the throne as Queen Victoria following the death of her uncle, King William IV. She soon shows her independence from the influence of her German mother, the Duchess of Kent, and her Belgian advisor, Baron Stockmar.

Lord Melbourne, her trusted Prime Minister, tells her he is growing old and she needs an advisor. He suggests she marry her German cousin Prince Albert of Saxe-Coburg and Gotha. Victoria considers Albert too straitlaced and serious, while he thinks she is frivolous, self-willed, overly talkative and too fond of dancing. Victoria decides to postpone inviting Albert and his older brother Ernest to visit, but when Melbourne informs her that Albert does not want to come, this immediately changes her mind and she insists he come.

Albert and Ernest's passage across the English Channel is rough and rain-drenched. When they are first presented to the Queen, Albert is not very friendly. Later, at a ball, Albert tells Ernest they are returning home the next day, but after a waltz with Victoria (the orchestra conducted by Johann Strauss), he cancels that plan. In the meantime, Victoria has decided she wants to marry Albert, but as he cannot propose to a sovereign, she decides she must do it herself, and he accepts.

After their marriage, Victoria devotes herself to government, rejecting Albert's offers to help, and he chafes at his life of reading and playing the piano. When Sir Robert Peel talks to Victoria about the merits of an income tax during a party, Albert tries to join the discussion, only to be again rebuffed by his wife. Albert finally rebels, and although Victoria is unyielding at first, she eventually gives in and lets him participate in governing, and slowly grows to rely on him.

During the social unrest and depression of the "Hungry Forties", Albert spots a would-be assassin and shields his wife during an open-carriage ride. The man only manages to shoot Albert's hat before being overpowered. (In reality, Edward Oxford did try to shoot the Queen in 1840, the first of seven or eight assassination attempts.)

In November 1841, Victoria and Albert's first male child, Prince Albert Edward, is born.

After an angry mob gathers outside the palace demanding bread, Victoria and Albert support Peel in repealing the Corn Laws.

In 1861, the Trent Affair threatens to bring the United Kingdom in on the side of the South in the American Civil War. Lord Palmerston, the Foreign Minister, is strongly in favour of a strong message to the United States, but Victoria insists otherwise, and Albert rewrites it so that hostilities are avoided.

That same year, Albert dies. Grieving, Victoria goes into seclusion, eventually resulting in public discontent with the monarchy. Finally, Prime Minister William Gladstone pleads with her to resume her public duties, asking her what Albert would have wanted. At this point, the film switches from black and white to colour, as she heeds Gladstone's advice.

== Cast ==
- Anna Neagle as Queen Victoria
- Anton Walbrook as Prince Albert
- Walter Rilla as Prince Ernest
- H. B. Warner as Lord Melbourne
- Mary Morris as Duchess of Kent
- James Dale as Duke of Wellington
- Felix Aylmer as Lord Palmerston
- Charles Carson as Sir Robert Peel
- Gordon McLeod as John Brown
- C. V. France as Archbishop of Canterbury
- Arthur Young as William Gladstone
- Greta Schröder as Baroness Lehzen
- Paul Leyssac as Baron Stockmar
- Derrick De Marney as younger Disraeli
- Hugh Miller as older Disraeli
- Percy Parsons as President Abraham Lincoln
- Hubert Harben as Lord Conyngham
- Henry Hallett as Joseph Chamberlain
- Clarence Blakiston as the Duke of Sussex
- Miles Malleson as Sir James, Albert's physician
- Moore Marriott as train driver
- Ivor Barnard as assassin
- Joyce Bland as Florence Nightingale (uncredited)
- Angela Braemar as Princess Alice (uncredited)
- Julian Royce as the Duke of Cambridge (uncredited)

== Production ==
When Laurence Housman's play Victoria Regina was banned by the Lord Chamberlain (at the time the royal family could not be shown on the British stage), its subsequent Broadway success prompted King Edward VIII to commission producer Herbert Wilcox to turn it into a film, commemorating the centenary of Victoria's reign.

== Critical reception ==
The Monthly Film Bulletin wrote: "Within self-imposed limits Herbert Wilcox has done a brilliant piece of work. His direction is imaginative and sympathetic, and shows understanding of a great age and great characters. His touch is sure, and his restraint admirable. A thoroughly well-chosen cast give of their very best. Anna Neagle makes a wonderful and satisfying Victoria. She is simple and sincere, dignified without being stiff, and tender without being sentimental."

Variety wrote, "Not cloak-and-cocked-hat historical tedium of pageantry and fancy dramatics, Victoria the Great travels a long way towards a full and clarified explanation of the most popular ruler England ever had... Anna Neagle, in the title role, gives an unwavering performance throughout. Anton Walbrook as Albert, the Prince Consort, is superb... The film wisely puts its prime focus on the private life of Victoria, her romance, marriage, and personal characteristics. Backgrounded is her public life, and her gradual rise to such high estimation of her people. Victoria the Great is done with a lavish hand – the closing sequence is in Technicolor [shot by William V. Skall]. The tinting isn’t too good, but serves effectively as a pointer-up for the climax".

In Sight & Sound, historian F. J. C. Hearnshaw noted that "By almost universal consent the film Victoria the Great is a brilliant and conspicuous success. Its reception in London has been one prolonged triumph. Its success is all the more remarkable because, so we are told, it was produced in the amazingly brief period of six weeks. There is, however, a freshness and spontaneity about it that suggests freedom from wearisome iterations". Hearnshaw listed twelve minor deviations from historical fact, adding: "Most of them, ...can be defended on the ground of histrionic desirability. When all is said, the fact remains that Victoria the Great is a supremely fine film, and one that reflects infinite credit upon both producer and actors".

In 2016 Sue Robinson wrote in the Radio Times: "It's all fairly tame, and a long way from the rough ride given to the royals of today. Yet Neagle's sympathy for the monarch shines through, and the final reel, which bursts into glorious Technicolor for the Diamond Jubilee, is a delightful piece of patriotic pomp."

== Bibliography ==
- The Great British Films, pp. 39–41, Jerry Vermilye, 1978, Citadel Press, ISBN 0-8065-0661-X
