= Desmond Jeans =

British actor (1903–1974)

- Born: 14 November 1903; Simla, British India
- Died: December 1974 (aged 71); Halifax, West Yorkshire, England, UK
- Years active: 1932–1957

Desmond Jeans (14 November 1903 – December 1974) was a British actor.

== Biography ==
He was the brother of actresses Isabel and Ursula Jeans. His wife, Margaret Livesey, was the sister of the actor Roger Livesey, who later married Ursula Jeans.

== Selected filmography ==
- The Blue Danube (1932)
- Diamond Cut Diamond (1932)
- The Girl from Maxim's (1933)
- Colonel Blood (1934)
- His Majesty and Company (1935)
- The Six Men (1951)
