= Nelson Keys =

British actor (1886–1939)

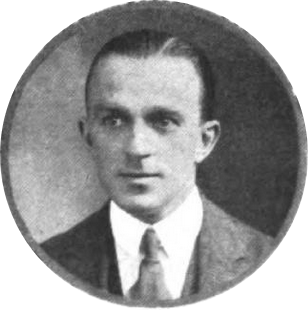
The Strand Magazine, January 1921

Nelson Keys (7 April 1886 in London, England – 26 April 1939 in London) was a British stage and film actor, a star in musical comedy and stage revue, including the 1924 Ziegfeld Follies.

He was the father of film producer Anthony Nelson Keys and director John Paddy Carstairs, who wrote his biography, Bunch in 1941.

== Filmography ==
Year	Title	Role	Notes
1916	Judged by Appearances		
1918	Once Upon a Time	Harry Gwynne	
1923	Castles in the Air		
1927	Tip Toes	Al Kaye	
1927	Madame Pompadour	Duc de Courcelette	
1927	Mumsie	Spud Murphy	
1928	The Triumph of the Scarlet Pimpernel	Robespierre	
1929	When Knights Were Bold	Sir Guy de Vere	
1929	Splinters		
1931	Almost a Divorce	Richard Leighton	
1933	Send 'em Back Half Dead	Hank Ruck	Short
1936	Eliza Comes to Stay	Sir Gregory	
1936	The Last Journey	The Frenchman	
1936	In the Soup	Emile Moppert	
1936	Dreams Come True	Anton	
1937	Wake Up Famous	Alfred Dimbleden	
1937	Knights for a Day	Bert Wrigley	(final film role)
