= Mumsie =

1927 film

- Directed by: Herbert Wilcox
- Based on: Mumsie by Edward Knoblock
- Produced by: Herbert Wilcox
- Starring: Pauline Frederick; Nelson Keys; Herbert Marshall; Frank Stanmore
- Cinematography: Bernard Knowles
- Production company: Herbert Wilcox Productions
- Distributed by: Woolf & Freedman Film Service
- Release date: September 1927
- Running time: 6,858 feet
- Country: United Kingdom
- Language: English

Mumsie is a 1927 British silent drama film directed by Herbert Wilcox and starring Pauline Frederick, Nelson Keys and Herbert Marshall. It was adapted from the 1920 play of the same title by Edward Knoblock about a favourite son of a family who proves to be a coward when war breaks out. Pauline Frederick's last silent film. Mumsie is a lost film. It was made at Twickenham Studios.

The film was a major success and helped Herbert Marshall establish himself in Hollywood soon afterwards.

== Cast ==
- Pauline Frederick as Mumsie
- Nelson Keys as Spud Murphy
- Herbert Marshall as Col. Armytage (film debut)
- Frank Stanmore as Nobby Clarke
- Donald Macardle as Noel Symonds
- Irene Russell as Louise Symonds
- Rolf Leslie as Edgar Symonds

== Bibliography ==
- Low, Rachel. The History of British Film: Volume IV, 1918–1929. Routledge, 1997.
