= Eva Moore =

English actress (1868–1955)

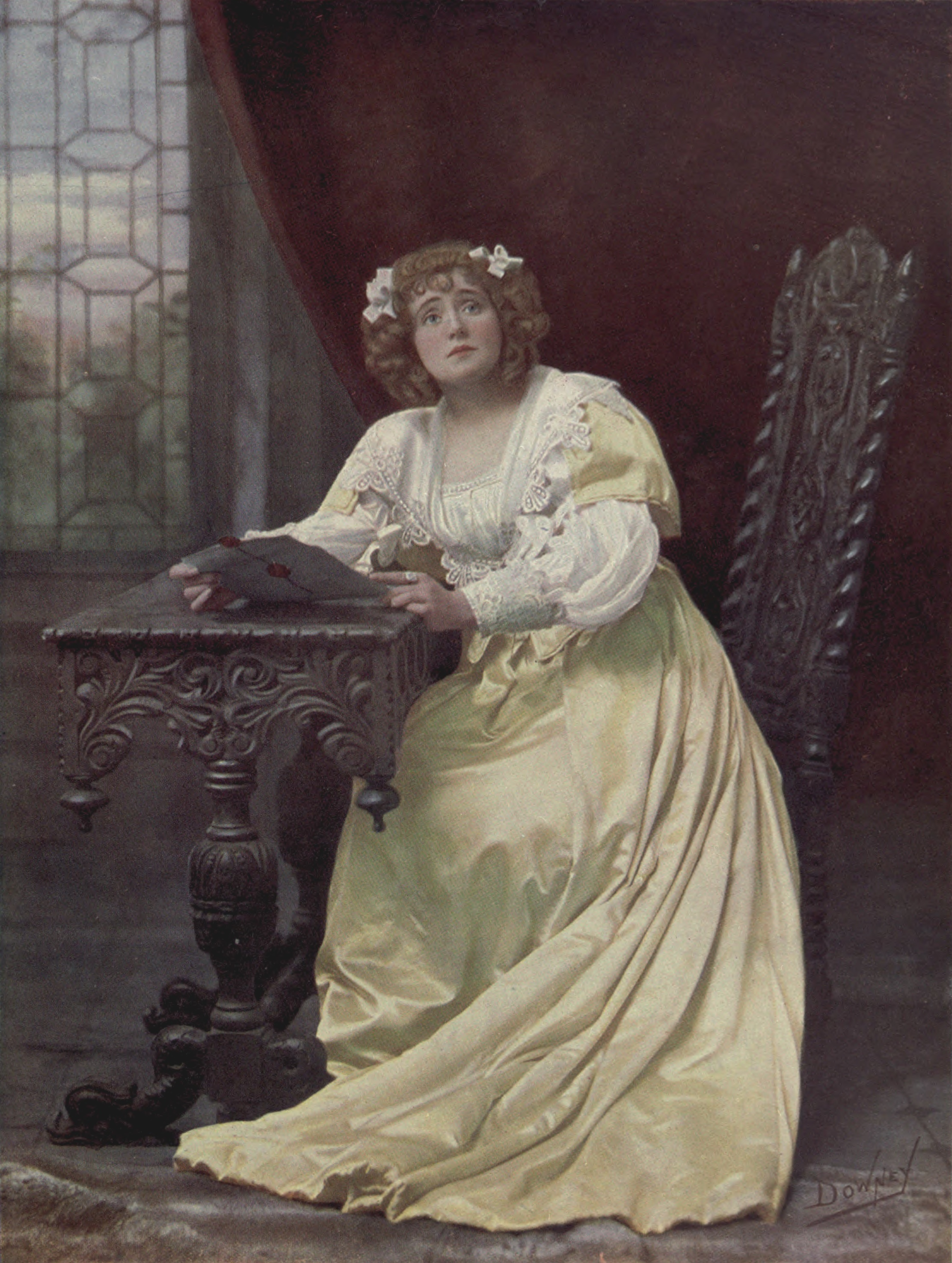
Eva Moore in the 1890s

Eva Moore (9 February 1868 – 27 April 1955) was an English actress. Her career on stage and in film spanned six decades, and she was active in the women's suffrage movement. In her 1923 book of reminiscences, Exits and Entrances, she describes approximately ninety of her roles in plays, but she continued to act on stage until 1945. She also acted in more than two dozen films. Her daughter, Jill Esmond, was the first wife of Laurence Olivier.

== Early life and career ==
Moore was born and educated in Brighton, Sussex, the eighth of ten children, the last of whom was the actress Decima Moore. Her parents were the chemist Edward Henry Moore and his wife, Emily (née Strachan) Moore. She attended Miss Pringle's school in Brighton and then studied gymnastics and dancing in Liverpool. Returning to Brighton, she taught dancing.

In 1891 she married actor/playwright Henry V. Esmond (1869–1922). They had three children: Jack (an actor), Jill (the actress Jill Esmond, first wife of Laurence Olivier) and Lynette, who did not survive infancy. Her husband wrote more than a dozen plays in which she appeared, and they appeared together in more than a dozen plays.

In Little Christopher Columbus, 1894

Moore made her first stage appearance at London's Vaudeville Theatre on 15 December 1887, as Varney in Proposals. She next joined Toole's company and appeared at Toole's Theatre on 26 December of that year as the Spirit of Home in Dot. In 1888, she was back at the Vaudeville in a play with her sisters Jessie and Decima, Partners, by Robert Williams Buchanan. In 1890, she created the role of the countess of Drumdurris in the Arthur Wing Pinero play The Cabinet Minister at the Court Theatre. In 1892, she appeared as Minestra in the comic opera The Mountebanks by W. S. Gilbert and Alfred Cellier. The next year, she created the role of Pepita in the long-running Little Christopher Columbus.

In 1894, she joined Charles Hawtrey and Lottie Venne in F. C. Burnand's A Gay Widow. Other stage roles included Mabel Vaughn in The Wilderness (1901); Lady Ernestone in Esmond's My Lady Virtue and Wilhelmina Marr in his Billy's Little Love Affair (both 1903); and Kathie in Old Heidelberg (1902 and 1909) with George Alexander. In 1907, she took the name part in Sweet Kitty Bellaire (1907) and played Mrs. Errol in Little Lord Fauntleroy, Mrs. Crowley in The Explorer in 1908, the Hon. Mrs. Bayle in Best People and Mrs. Rivers in The House Opposite in 1909.

== Later years and films ==
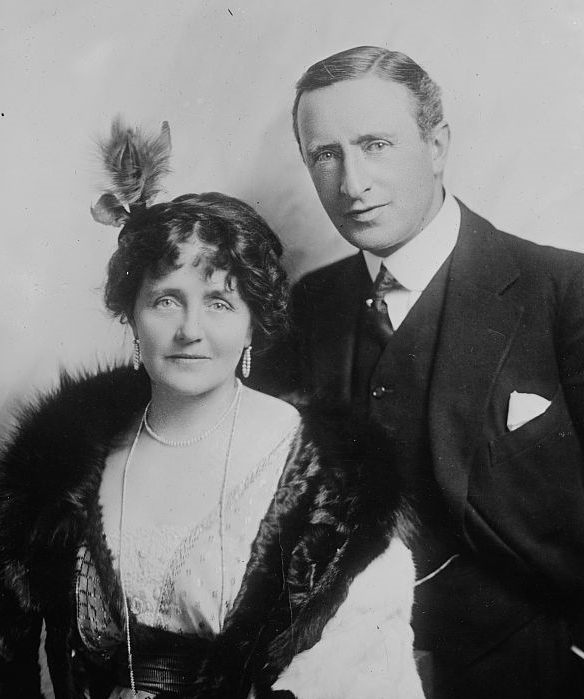
Moore with her husband Henry V. Esmond

Moore was active in the suffrage movement (as was her sister Decima), attending meetings and appearing in suffragist plays and films. She was a founder of the Actresses' Franchise League in 1908 but resigned from that organisation when other members objected to her acting in a sketch called "Her Vote", by her husband, in which the heroine prefers kisses to votes. Moore later managed her husband's comedy Eliza Comes to Stay, which opened at the Criterion Theatre on 12 February 1913, transferring to the Vaudeville Theatre on 6 July 1914, and then took the play to New York City for an unsuccessful run. After the First World War began, she continued acting at the Vaudeville in the evenings but worked as a volunteer during the day for the Women's Emergency Corps, based at the Little Theatre.

She raised money for hospital and wartime causes and was honoured with the ordre de la Reine Elisabeth for her wartime activities. At the Royalty Theatre, she played Mrs. Culver in the 1918 play The Title, by Arnold Bennett, where she also played Mrs. Etheridge in Caesar's Wife by W. Somerset Maugham and the title role in Mumsie. In October 1920, she and Esmond began an extensive tour of Canada with Nigel Bruce as their stage manager, who played Montague Jordan in Eliza Comes to Stay, which re-opened at the Duke of York's Theatre in London on 14 June 1923.

From 1920 to 1946, Moore made over two dozen films, beginning with The Law Divine (1920). Some of her best-received silent films were Flames of Passion (1922), The Great Well (1924), Chu-Chin-Chow (1925) and Motherland (1927). Her most popular 'talkies' included Almost a Divorce (1931), The Old Dark House (1932), Leave It to Smith (1933), I Was a Spy (1933), Jew Süss (1934), A Cup of Kindness (1934), Vintage Wine (1935), The Divorce of Lady X (1938, which starred her son-in-law Laurence Olivier) and Of Human Bondage (1946).

Moore published her reminiscences, Exits and Entrances, in 1923 but continued to act until 1945. In later years, she resided at Bisham, Maidenhead, Berkshire, England, dying of myocardial degeneration at age 87.
