= Castles in the Air (1923 film) =

1923 British film by Fred Paul

- Directed by: Fred Paul
- Written by: Walter Summers
- Produced by: G.B. Samuelson
- Starring: Lillian Hall-Davis; Nelson Keys; Campbell Gullan; Mary Rorke
- Production company: British-Super Films
- Release date: 1923
- Country: United Kingdom
- Language: English

Castles in the Air is a 1923 British silent drama film directed by Fred Paul and starring Nelson Keys, Lillian Hall-Davis and Campbell Gullan. It was originally made as Let's Pretend.

== Cast ==
- Nelson Keys
- Lillian Hall-Davis
- Campbell Gullan
- Mary Rorke
- Julian Royce
