= The Wonderful Story (1922 film) =

1922 film

- Directed by: Graham Cutts
- Written by: Patrick L. Mannock
- Based on: Short story by I.A.R. Wylie
- Produced by: Herbert Wilcox
- Starring: Lillian Hall-Davis; Herbert Langley; Olaf Hytten
- Production company: Graham-Wilcox Productions
- Distributed by: Astra-National
- Release date: 1922
- Country: United Kingdom
- Language: English
- Budget: £1,400

The Wonderful Story is a 1922 British drama film directed by Graham Cutts and starring Lillian Hall-Davis, Herbert Langley and Olaf Hytten.

It was based on the short story of the same name by I. A. R. Wylie, which was originally published in the January 1921 issue of Nash's and Pall Mall Magazine.

== Plot ==
The fiancée of a farmer falls in love with his brother.

== Production ==
Herbert Wilcox had a lot of success distributing a British film, A Peep Behind the Scenes (1919) and decided to produce a British film himself. He raised £1,400 and picked The Wonderful Story because he believed as it was homely and had few characters it would be suited for the cinema. The film was made on budget of £1,400 and Wilcox sold the rights to it for £4,000. Despite being acclaimed by the critics it was considered a failure at the box office.

== Cast ==
- Lillian Hall-Davis – Kate Richards
- Herbert Langley – Robert Martin
- Olaf Hytten – Jimmy Martin
- Bernard Vaughan – Vicar

== Bibliography ==
- Low, Rachel. The History of British Film: Volume IV, 1918–1929. Routledge, 1997.
