= A Royal Divorce (1938 film) =

- Directed by: Jack Raymond
- Written by: Miles Malleson; Jacques Théry
- Produced by: Herbert Wilcox
- Starring: Ruth Chatterton; Pierre Blanchar; Carol Goodner
- Cinematography: Freddie Young
- Edited by: Peggy Hennessey
- Music by: Anthony Collins
- Production company: Imperator Films
- Distributed by: Paramount British Pictures
- Release date: 21 September 1938 (United Kingdom)
- Running time: 85 minutes
- Country: United Kingdom
- Language: English

A Royal Divorce is a 1938 British historical drama film directed by Jack Raymond and starring Ruth Chatterton, Pierre Blanchar and Frank Cellier. The film portrays the complex relationship between Napoleon I of France and his wife, Josephine Bonaparte from their first meeting until their divorce more than a decade later. It was shot at Denham Studios in Buckinghamshire. The film's sets were designed by the art director David Rawnsley.

== Cast ==
- Ruth Chatterton as Josephine de Beauharnais
- Pierre Blanchar as Napoleon Bonaparte
- Frank Cellier as Talleyrand
- Carol Goodner as Mme. Tallien
- Auriol Lee as Napoleon's Mother
- George Curzon as Barras
- Laurence Hanray as Klemens von Metternich
- John Laurie as Joseph Bonaparte
- Jack Hawkins as Captain Charles
- Rosalyn Boulter as Hortense
- Allan Jeayes as Marat
- Moran Caplat as Eugene
- Romilly Lunge as Junot
- Hubert Harben as DeTracy
- David Farrar as Louis Bonaparte
- Julian Somers as Lucien Bonaparte
- Sonia Carol as Eliza
- Tamara d'Etter as Pauline
- Ivy Shannon as Caroline

== Critical reception ==
TV Guide called the film a "mediocre adaptation", while Allmovie wrote, "in terms of costumes and settings, A Royal Divorce is authentic to a fault; in terms of adherence to the facts, it's a bit shaky, though undeniably dramatic.

== See also ==
- A Royal Divorce (1923)
- Cultural depictions of Napoleon I of France

== Bibliography ==
- Low, Rachael. Filmmaking in 1930s Britain. George Allen & Unwin, 1985.
- Wood, Linda. British Films, 1927-1939. British Film Institute, 1986.
