= Cupid in Clover =

1929 British film by Frank Miller

- Directed by: Frank Miller
- Written by: Upton Gray; Frank Miller
- Starring: George Wynn; Winifred Evans; Herbert Langley; Wyndham Guise
- Production company: British Screen Productions
- Distributed by: British Screen Productions
- Release date: February 1929
- Running time: 6,481 feet
- Country: United Kingdom
- Language: English

Cupid in Clover is a 1929 British sound romance film directed by Frank Miller and starring George Wynn, Winifred Evans and Herbert Langley. While the film has no audible dialog, it features a synchronized musical score with sound effects along with a theme song. The film was adapted from the novel Yellow Corn by Upton Gray and made at Isleworth Studios in London.

== Cast ==
- Winifred Evans as Lyddy
- George Wynn as Fred Amyon
- Herbert Langley as John Simpson
- Betty Siddons as Clary Simpson
- Eric Findon as George Dowey
- Charles Garry as Joe Dowey
- Marie Esterhazy as Maggie
- Wyndham Guise
- James Knight
- Jack Miller

== Music ==
The film featured a theme song entitled "Yellow Corn" by Pat Heale, Stanley Damerell and Robert Hargreaves (words) and Harry Tilsley and Tolchard Evans (music).

== Bibliography ==
- Low, Rachael. History of the British Film, 1918-1929. George Allen & Unwin, 1971.
