= Southern Love =

1924 film

- Directed by: Herbert Wilcox
- Written by: Henry Wadsworth Longfellow (play); Herbert Wilcox; Terry Stanford
- Produced by: Herbert Wilcox
- Starring: Betty Blythe; Herbert Langley; Randle Ayrton; Warwick Ward
- Cinematography: René Guissart
- Production company: Graham-Wilcox Productions
- Distributed by: Graham-Wilcox Productions
- Release date: 1924
- Country: United Kingdom
- Language: English
- Budget: £12,000

Southern Love is a 1924 British drama film directed by Herbert Wilcox and starring Betty Blythe, Herbert Langley and Randle Ayrton. It is based on the verse drama The Spanish Student by Henry Wadsworth Longfellow. It is known by the alternative title Woman's Secret.

== Premise ==
Dolores, a young gypsy woman, escapes from an arranged marriage and makes a living as a dancer.

== Cast ==
- Betty Blythe – Dolores
- Herbert Langley – Pedro
- Randle Ayrton – Count de Silva
- Warwick Ward – Dick Tennant
- Liane Haid – Countess de Silva
- Hal Martin – Gypsy

== Production ==
After making Chu Chin Chow in Germany Herbert Wilcox was approached by other European film companies to make co productions. He picked a Viennese company hoping to break into the English market. Wilcox says he was unhappy with the story he was given so he decided to make his own story. Wilcox found filming in Vienna difficult. He launched the film with a mock bull fight in Albert Hall and says the film made a profit in England alone. He says Al Woods offered $250,000 for the US rights after he heard about the premiere but reneged after he saw the film.

== Reception ==
The film debuted at Albert Hall in front of 10,000 people.
