= Sixty Glorious Years =

- A poster with the film's US title: Queen of Destiny
- Directed by: Herbert Wilcox
- Written by: Charles de Grandcourt (writer); Miles Malleson (writer); Sir Robert Vansittart (dialogue); Sir Robert Vansittart (scenario)
- Produced by: Herbert Wilcox
- Starring: See below
- Cinematography: Freddie Young, William V. Skall
- Edited by: Jill Irving
- Music by: Anthony Collins
- Production company: Imperator Film Productions
- Distributed by: RKO Radio Pictures
- Release date: 14 October 1938 (UK)
- Running time: 95 minutes
- Country: United Kingdom
- Language: English
- Budget: £211,212
- Box office: $981,000

Sixty Glorious Years is a 1938 British colour historical film directed by Herbert Wilcox. The film is a sequel to the 1937 film Victoria the Great.

The film is also known as Queen of Destiny in the US.

== Cast ==
- Anna Neagle as Queen Victoria
- Anton Walbrook as Prince Albert
- C. Aubrey Smith as the Duke of Wellington
- Walter Rilla as Prince Ernest
- Greta Schröder as Baroness Lehzen
- Charles Carson as Sir Robert Peel
- Felix Aylmer as Lord Palmerston
- Lewis Casson as Lord John Russell
- Pamela Standish as the Princess Royal
- Gordon McLeod as John Brown
- Henry Hallett as Joseph Chamberlain
- Wyndham Goldie as Arthur Balfour
- Malcolm Keen as William Ewart Gladstone
- Frederick Leister as H. H. Asquith
- Derrick De Marney as Benjamin Disraeli
- Joyce Bland as Florence Nightingale
- Frank Cellier as Lord Derby
- Harvey Braban as Lord Salisbury
- Aubrey Dexter as the Prince of Wales
- Robert Eddison as Lanternist Professor
- Stuart Robertson as George Edward Anson
- Olaf Olsen as the Crown Prince of Prussia
- Marie Wright as Maggie
- Laidman Browne as Gen. Gordon

== Box office ==
Kinematograph Weekly reported the film did well at the British box office in December 1938.

== Critical reception ==
The Radio Times gave the film 3 out of five stars, calling it "old-fashioned, four-square, and very nice"; and TV Guide also gave the same rating, calling the film "an unnecessary, but worthwhile, sequel to the epic screen biography Victoria the Great (1937)... As was the case in Victoria the Great, Wilcox's production values are superlative, with the sets and costumes accurate reproductions of the actual items which are housed at the British Museum. The American public was so interested in both the Queen Victoria films that RKO and Wilcox formed a contract that ensured distribution of British films in the U.S. and an exchange of American and British talent for various productions. This led to husband and wife Wilcox and Neagle's next project, Nurse Edith Cavell (1939), which was produced in Hollywood."
