= The Blue Danube (1932 film) =

1932 British film by Herbert Wilcox

- Original French poster
- Directed by: Herbert Wilcox
- Written by: Miles Malleson
- Based on: story by Doris Zinkeisen
- Produced by: Herbert Wilcox
- Starring: Brigitte Helm; Joseph Schildkraut; Dorothy Bouchier
- Cinematography: Freddie Young
- Edited by: Michael Hankinson
- Music by: Alfred Rode
- Production companies: Gaumont-British Picture Corporation; British & Dominions Film Corporation
- Distributed by: Woolf & Freedman Film Service (UK)
- Release date: 11 January 1932 (London)
- Running time: 72 minutes
- Country: United Kingdom
- Language: English

The Blue Danube is a 1932 British romance film directed by Herbert Wilcox and starring Brigitte Helm, Joseph Schildkraut and Desmond Jeans. Its plot, based on a short story by Doris Zinkeisen, concerns a Hungarian gypsy who leaves his girlfriend for a countess, but soon begins to suffer heartache. The Blue Danube was made in both English and German-language versions.

== Plot ==
In a Hungarian gypsy encampment, carefree Sandor ives with his beautiful sweetheart Yutka. Into their lives rides a blonde countess, with whom Sandor becomes infatuated.

Yutka soon flees from her faithless lover. Sandor roams the country, searching for his lost love, but finds her too late — she now wears furs and has her own aristocratic love—and Sandor returns heartbroken to his Romany encampment.

== Cast ==
- Chili Bouchier as Yutka
- Brigitte Helm as Countess Gabriella Kovacs
- Joseph Schildkraut as Sandor
- Desmond Jeans as Johann
- Alfred Rode and His Royal Tzigane Band as Gypsy Band
- Patrick Ludlow as Companion
- Léonide Massine as Dancer (credited as Masine and Nikitina)
- Nikitina as Dancer

== Production ==
Herbert Wilcox later wrote in his memoirs that he made the film because he was frustrated from making a series of photographed stage plays. He wanted to make a "talking that did not talk - and without subtitles. Music, of course, was to be a dominant substitute for words or text". He decided to make a film with minimal dialogue.

== Critical reception ==
Wilcox claims the reviews he received were among the worst of his career. However he said the film recovered its cost from screening in Australia alone.

In contemporary reviews, Frank Nugent in The New York Times wrote, "The chief merit of "Blue Danube," a British film now showing at the Fifty-fifth Street Playhouse, is its presentation of Alfred Rode and his Royal Tzigany Band, a group of eighteen Hungarian gypsy musicians. They play the famous Strauss waltz, some melodies by Liszt and a guitar song of Mr. Rode's composition. Not being a music critic, nor possessing one's technical vocabulary, this corner must be content to report that the selections are played in a manner that sets one's blood to pounding. But Mr. Rode and his band are not all the story of 'Blue Danube.' To be exact, they are little of it, and the rest is a sorry tale of poor editing, incoherence and an overwrought performance by Joseph Schildkraut." The critic concluded that "there is nothing in the film's acting, direction or tempo to arouse enthusiasm."

The Monthly Film Bulletin described the film as "very dated" and that it "must not be looked on as a typical example of Herbert Wilcox's production". The review concluded that neither the sound or photography were "up to modern standards".

More recently, TV Guide called it a "plodding Gypsy musical."
