= Send 'em Back Half Dead =

- Directed by: Redd Davis
- Produced by: Cecil Landeau
- Starring: Nelson Keys; Polly Luce; Ben Welden
- Production company: Cecil Landeau Productions
- Distributed by: Fox Film
- Release date: May 1933
- Running time: 44 minutes
- Country: United Kingdom
- Language: English

Send 'em Back Half Dead is a 1933 comedy film directed by Redd Davis and starring Nelson Keys, Polly Luce and Ben Welden. It is intended as a parody of the American film Bring 'Em Back Alive, released the previous year.

It was made at Blattner Studios, Elstree, as a quota quickie for distribution by Fox Film.

== Cast ==
- Nelson Keys as Hank Ruck
- Polly Luce as Marie Ruck
- Ben Welden as Mustapha
- Kenneth Kove as Roland Peabody
- Andreas Malandrinos as Tony
- Jack Harris

== Bibliography ==
- Chibnall, Steve. Quota Quickies: The British of the British 'B' Film. British Film Institute, 2007.
- Low, Rachael. Filmmaking in 1930s Britain. George Allen & Unwin, 1985.
- Wood, Linda. British Films, 1927-1939. British Film Institute, 1986.
