= Nell Gwyn (1926 film) =

1926 film by Herbert Wilcox

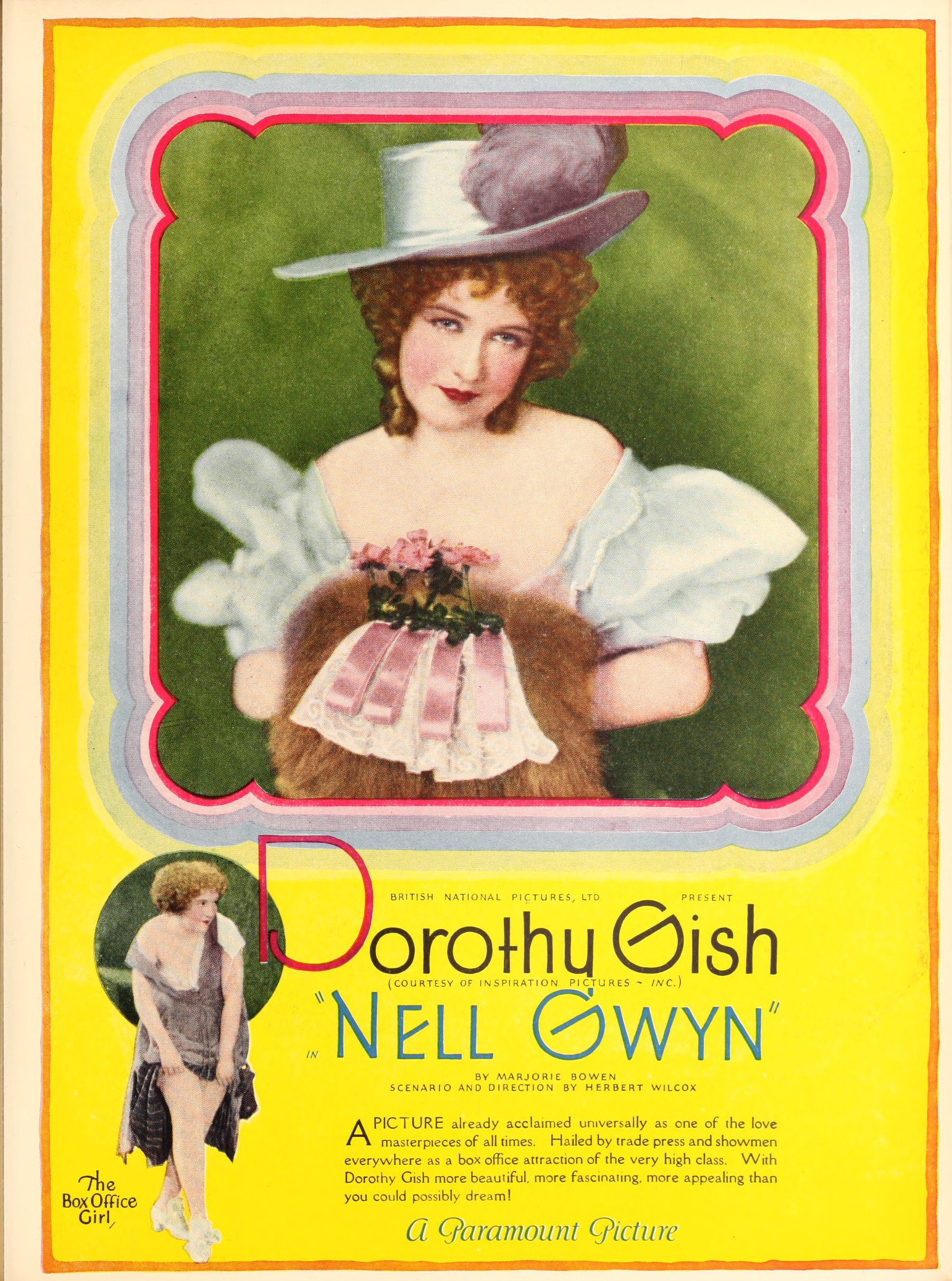
- Advertisement
- Directed by: Herbert Wilcox
- Written by: Marjorie Bowen (novel); Herbert Wilcox
- Produced by: Herbert Wilcox
- Starring: Dorothy Gish; Randle Ayrton; Juliette Compton; Sydney Fairbrother
- Cinematography: Roy F. Overbaugh
- Edited by: William Hamilton
- Production company: British National Pictures
- Distributed by: First National Film Distributors; Paramount Pictures (US)
- Release date: 18 July 1926 (US)
- Running time: 80 minutes
- Country: United Kingdom
- Language: Silent (English intertitles)
- Budget: £20,000 or £22,000
- Box office: over £100,000

Nell Gwyn is a 1926 British silent romance film directed by Herbert Wilcox and starring Dorothy Gish, Randle Ayrton and Juliette Compton. It was based on the 1926 novel Mistress Nell Gwyn by Marjorie Bowen and follows the life of Nell Gwynne, the mistress of Charles II. Wilcox later made a second version of the film in 1934, Nell Gwyn which starred Anna Neagle.

== Plot ==
As described in a film magazine review, Nell Gwyn is first seen as an orange girl at the Old Drury Theatre in London. She attracts the eye of the King and he makes her one of the players at His Majesty's Theatre. She succeeds and winning the King's affection becomes his favorite, vying with Lady Castlemaine for his favors. Through her efforts, a palace which he is building for her is converted into a home for disabled soldiers and sailors. When his hour of death nears, the King dies in her arms, with her name on his lips.

== Cast ==
Juliette Compton as Lady Castlemaine

- Dorothy Gish as Nell Gwyn
- Randle Ayrton as Charles II
- Juliette Compton as Lady Castlemaine
- Sydney Fairbrother as Mrs. Gwyn
- Donald Macardle as Duke of Monmouth
- Johnny Butt as Samuel Pepys
- Gibb McLaughlin as Duke of York
- Judd Green as Toby Clinker
- Edward Sorley as Dickon
- Forrester Harvey as Charles Hart
- Fred Rains as Earl of Shaftesbury
- Rolf Leslie as Evelyn
- Aubrey Fitzgerald as Tom Killigrew
- Tom Coventry as Innkeeper
- Booth Conway as Messenger
- Dorinea Shirley as Maid

== Production ==
Wilcox said he got the idea to make the film after making The Only Way. He saw a theatre bill headlined by "Dolly Elswrothy" and remembered a sketch he saw where Elsworthy played Nell Gwyn. He cabled to see if Dorothy Gish was available and she accepted.

Dorothy Gish was paid £7,000 (£1,000 a week plus expenses). Wilcox arranged to finance the film with an accountant, everyone contributing half. Wilcox says the accountant reneged and he had to finance the film entirely himself. To save money he edited the film himself.

One report says the film was made for £20,000 and Wilcox sold it outright for £35,000. Wilcox says it was made for £14,000 and he sold it for £20,000. The company that bought it was British National Pictures.

== Reception ==
=== Critical ===
The New York Times wrote, "Whatever may be the shortcomings of English motion picture producers. If they can put together other pictures as simply and with as much dramatic effect as this story of Nell Gwyn they should have no difficulty obtaining a showing for them anywhere. The story moves quickly and surely, with nothing to strain one's credulity, and the acting of Miss Gish and Randie Ayrton, who takes the part of Charles, is excellent. So is that of Juliette Compton as Lady Castlemaine. The immorality of the period is suggested without being offensive, and for the second time this Summer a good picture has not been spoiled by prudery. The titles are unusually good and frequently amusing, that dear old gossip Pepys being resorted to for purposes of verisimilitude."

=== Box office ===
Wilcox says the film "was a riotous success throughout the world." It was sold to the US for £28,000.

It did so well that British National Films signed Wilcox and Gish to make three more films together, which would be financed by Paramount.

=== Censorship ===
British National Pictures objected after the Quebec Board of Censors, known for its strictness, banned the showing of Nell Gwyn on the grounds of "nudity."

== Bibliography ==
- Street, Sarah. Transatlantic crossings: British feature films in the United States. Continuum International Publishing, 2002.
