= Frank Cochrane =

British actor (1882–1962)

in the opening credits of The Tenth Man (1936)

Frank Cochrane (28 October 1882 – 21 May 1962) was a British stage and film actor. Born in Durham, England. Amongst his stage work, he starred in the original production of Chu Chin Chow at His Majesty's Theatre in London in 1916; as well as in the 1934 film version.

== Selected filmography ==
- Brigadier Gerard (1915)
- The Yellow Mask (1930)
- Chu Chin Chow (1934)
- McGlusky the Sea Rover (1935)
- Bulldog Drummond at Bay (1937)
- What a Man! (1938)
- Warning to Wantons (1949)
