= Randle Ayrton =

British actor and producer (1869–1940)

- Randle Ayrton, 1938
- Born: Randle Ayrton; 9 August 1869; Chester, England
- Died: 28 May 1940 (aged 70); Stratford-upon-Avon, Warwickshire, England
- Occupations: Actor, producer and director
- Years active: 1890 – 1937

Frederick Randle Ayrton (9 August 1869 – 28 May 1940) was a British actor of stage and screen, and was also a producer and director.

== Early life ==
Ayrton was born in Chester to William Frances Ayrton, a wealthy wine-merchant who was a partner and co-founder of the firm of Ayrton & Groome, and his second wife Pauline (Fleischmann). Two of Randle's full brothers also gained prominence. The eldest, William Ayrton (1861-1916), was an artist based in Suffolk. The youngest, Maxwell Ayrton (1874-1960), was a leading architect.

The Ayrton family originated in Yorkshire. Randle's forebear Edward Ayrton was mayor of Ripon in 1760, and laid the foundations for the family's subsequent prominence.

Ayrton was educated at The King's School, Chester and Geneva University.

== Career ==
Ayrton made his stage debut in 1890, at the Old Avenue Theatre in London and was successful on stage in London and in America into the late 1930s.In 1918 he appeared in the comedy The Freedom of the Seas at the Theatre Royal, Haymarket. He was reputed to have been the finest King Lear of the 1930s.

In 1913, he began his film career with the old London Film Company. He made a successful transition from silents to talkies, working for a number of film studios during his screen career. Randle Ayrton was also the producer, and director, of several films.

== Selected filmography ==
- Profit and the Loss (1917)
- My Sweetheart (1918)
- The Hanging Judge (1918)
- The Wonderful Year (1921)
- No. 5 John Street (1921)
- Chu-Chin-Chow (1923)
- Southern Love (1924)
- The Little People (1926)
- Nell Gwyn (1926)
- One of the Best (1927)
- His House in Order (1928)
- High Seas (1929)
- The Feather (1929)
- The Hate Ship (1929)
- A Romance of Seville (1929)
- The Manxman (1929)
- Glorious Youth (1929)
- The Great Game (1930)
- Two Worlds (1930)
- Dreyfus (1931)
- Jew Suss (1934)
- Me and Marlborough (1935)
- Debt of Honour (1936)
- Talk of the Devil (1936)
