= London (1926 film) =

1926 film

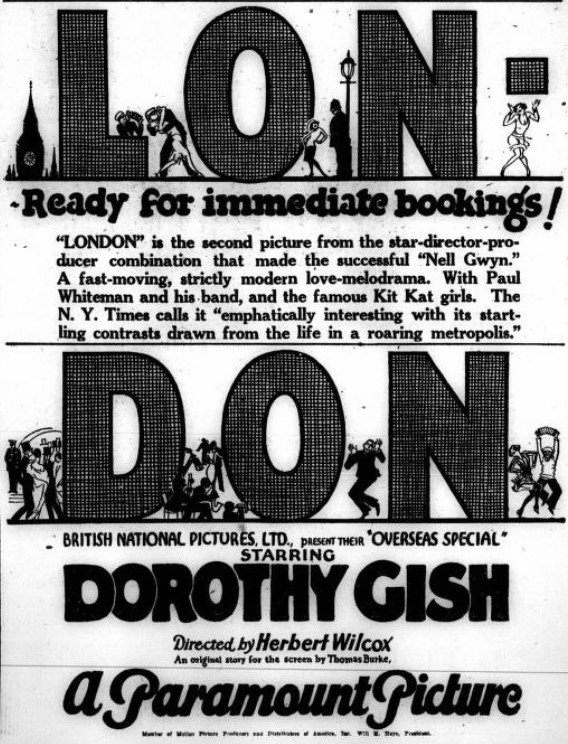
- Advertisement
- Directed by: Herbert Wilcox
- Written by: Thomas Burke
- Produced by: Herbert Wilcox
- Starring: Dorothy Gish
- Production company: British National Films
- Distributed by: Paramount Pictures
- Release date: 1926
- Running time: 6 reels
- Country: United Kingdom
- Language: Silent (English intertitles)
- Budget: £42,000

London is a 1926 British silent romantic drama film, directed by Herbert Wilcox and starring Dorothy Gish. The film was adapted by Wilcox from a short story by popular author Thomas Burke. The British Film Institute considers this to be a lost film.

== Plot ==
Mavis Hogan lives with her uncaring aunt in a squalid Limehouse tenement. Her beauty attracts the attention of an unsavoury Chinese man, whose intentions are encouraged by the aunt. While wandering around Limehouse, she is spotted by an artist who is in the area sketching East End scenes and people. He persuades her to allow him to sketch her portrait, which he later puts on display in his West End studio. The portrait is seen by Lady Arbourfield, who notices a remarkable resemblance to her own daughter, now deceased.

Finally finding the attentions of the Chinese man too much, Mavis leaves her home and walks to the West End with no real idea as to what she will do when she gets there. Coincidentally, she happens to cross the path of Lady Arbourfield. She is offered a home and the chance to make her way in "society". Adapting remarkably well to her new milieu, Mavis falls in love with the Lady Arbourfield's nephew, but is distraught when she is passed over in favour of another young woman who has had him in her sights. In her grief, she leaves her new surroundings and returns aimlessly to Limehouse. However, the artist tracks her down and asks her to marry him, which she happily accepts.

== Cast ==
- Dorothy Gish as Mavis Hogan
- John Manners as Geoffrey Malvern
- Hubert Carter as Charles Down
- Gibb McLaughlin as Ah Kwang
- Margaret Yarde as Eliza Critten
- Elissa Landi as Alice Cranston
- Adelqui Migliar as Paul Merlan
- Daisy Campbell as Lady Arbourfield

== Background ==
London belongs in the canon of "Limehouse" silent films, pioneered by 1919's hugely successful Broken Blossoms which starred Gish's sister Lillian. These films were set in what was then London's Chinatown, an area which was generally perceived as dangerous, crime-ridden, decadent and immoral; as alien, impenetrable and exotic to most Londoners as if it had been on the other side of the world. Limehouse films, invariably featuring a young, beautiful and innocent English girl falling prey to shady, sinister characters who wished her ill, found a huge market both in the UK and overseas, and became an ongoing feature of 1920s silent cinema.

The Limehouse genre was as popular in the U.S. as in the UK. Aware of the revenue potential of the American market, Wilcox tailored London as a big-budget production. He engaged American star Dorothy Gish for the leading role, paying her £1,000 per week—an exceptional amount for the time.

== Production ==
Wilcox was paid £3,000 for the film plus 25% of the profits. The entire film was financed by Paramount.

== Reception ==
On its release, London received generally good, albeit not outstanding, reviews. The photography and acting was praised, although the storyline was deemed unconvincing and over-reliant on coincidence. The film ran in cinemas through the first half of 1927 but then disappeared from view, and no evidence can be found that it was ever distributed again after its first run.

There were no profits.

== Preservation ==
The British Film Institute does not hold a print in the BFI National Archive and currently classes the film as "missing, believed lost". London is included on the BFI's "75 Most Wanted" list of missing British feature films.

== See also ==
- List of lost films
