= Chu Chin Chow (1934 film) =

1934 British film by Walter Forde

- Directed by: Walter Forde
- Screenplay by: Edward Knoblock; L. du Garde Peach; Sidney Gilliat
- Based on: Chu Chin Chow by Oscar Asche; Frederick Norton
- Produced by: Michael Balcon
- Starring: George Robey; Fritz Kortner; Anna May Wong
- Cinematography: Mutz Greenbaum
- Edited by: Derek Twist
- Production company: Gainsborough Pictures
- Distributed by: Gainsborough Pictures
- Release date: May 1934
- Running time: 95 minutes
- Country: United Kingdom
- Language: English

Chu Chin Chow is a 1934 British musical film directed by Walter Forde and starring George Robey, Fritz Kortner and Anna May Wong. It was an adaptation of the hit musical Chu Chin Chow by Oscar Asche and Frederick Norton. It was shot at the Islington Studios of Gainsborough Pictures in London. The film's sets were designed by the art director Ernö Metzner.

It is claimed that the movie's title inspired the name of the Marvel Comics monster Fin Fang Foom.

== Cast ==
- George Robey as Ali Baba
- Fritz Kortner as Abu Hasan
- Anna May Wong as Zahrat
- John Garrick as Nur-al-din Baba
- Pearl Argyle as Marjanah
- Malcolm McEachern as Abdullah
- Dennis Hoey as Rakham,
- Sydney Fairbrother as Mahbubah Baba
- Laurence Hanray as Kasim Baba
- Frank Cochrane as Mustafa
- Thelma Tuson as Alcolom Baba,
- Francis L. Sullivan as The Caliph
- Gibb McLaughlin as The Caliph's Vizier
- Kiyoshi Takase as Entertainer at Feast

== Critical reception ==
The New York Times wrote, "The cry this morning should be 'The Redcoats are coming!' Britain's long-heralded invasion of the American film market has begun with the offerings at the Roxy of Chu Chin Chow, a tuneful, spectacular and robust adaptation of the Oscar Asche comic operetta."

== See also ==
- Chu-Chin-Chow (1923)
