= Flames of Passion =

1922 film

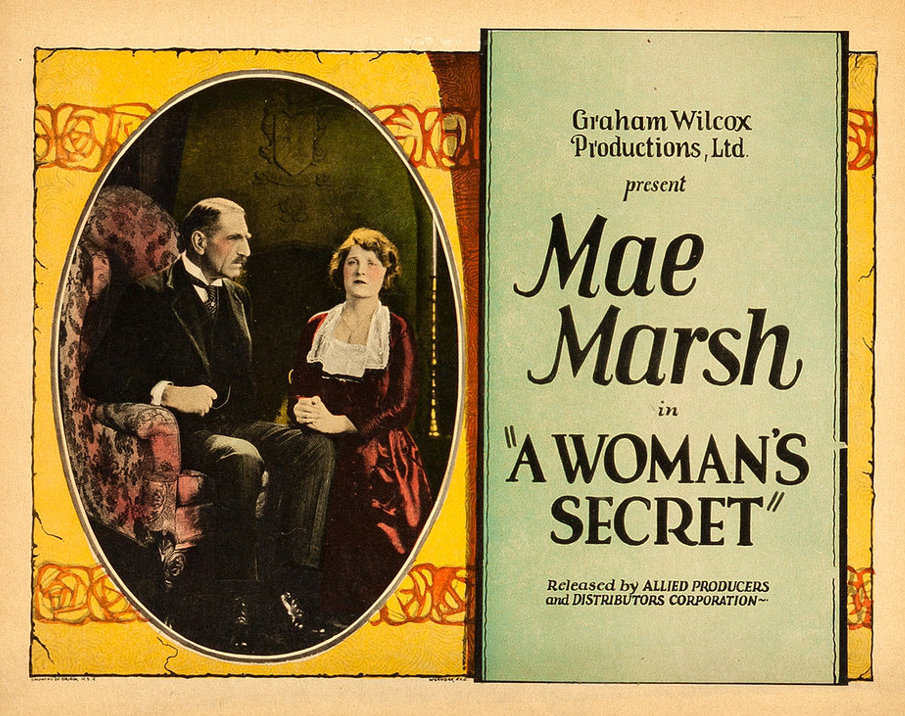
- An American lobby card using the American title A Woman's Secret
- Directed by: Graham Cutts
- Written by: Herbert Wilcox; M. V. Wilcox
- Produced by: Herbert Wilcox
- Starring: Mae Marsh; C. Aubrey Smith
- Cinematography: René Guissart
- Production company: Graham-Wilcox Productions
- Distributed by: Astra Film
- Release date: November 1922
- Running time: 9 reels
- Country: United Kingdom
- Languages: Silent film English intertitles

Flames of Passion is a 1922 British silent film drama directed by Graham Cutts, starred Mae Marsh and C. Aubrey Smith.

The film was made by the newly formed Graham-Wilcox Productions company, a joint venture between Cutts and producer Herbert Wilcox. The entrepreneurial Wilcox tempted American star Marsh to England with a high salary offer, believing this would improve the film's marketability in the U.S. She was paid £1,000 a week.

The gamble paid off as it became the first post-war British film to be sold to the U.S. The final reel of the film was filmed in the bi-pack color process Prizma Color.

== Plot ==
The wife of a wealthy barrister seduces her chauffeur, with whom she falls in love. She gives birth to a baby, apparently without her husband knowing anything about her pregnancy.

The child is killed by the chauffeur during a car accident—he was visibly drunk when driving. The result is a showpiece trial at the Old Bailey, presumably of the chauffeur on a charge of infanticide, in which the woman at first tries to protect her lover, but is forced finally under cross-examination to make a dramatic public confession that the dead infant was hers. By the end of the film, she returns to her husband.

== Cast ==
- Mae Marsh as Dorothy Hawke
- C. Aubrey Smith as Richard Hawke, K.C.
- Hilda Bayley as Kate Watson
- Herbert Langley as Arthur Watson
- Allan Aynesworth as Forbes
- Eva Moore as Aunt
- George K. Arthur as Friend
- Henry Vibart as Lord Chief Justice

== Reception ==
Flames of Passion proved controversial with critics, many of whom found the subject matter lurid, sensationalist and distasteful. Cinemagoers had no such qualms, and turned the film into a big box-office hit, Wilcox's first commercial success.

This was the first British film to be sold for distribution in the United States following World War I where it was shown under the title A Woman's Secret.

== Preservation status ==
A print with Dutch titles exists at the British Film Institute.

== See also ==
- List of early colour feature films
