= Hermann Roßmann =

German writer

- Born: 15 February 1902; Berlin, Germany
- Died: 3 March 1985 (aged 83); Wörgl, Austria
- Occupation: Writer

Hermann Roßmann (15 February 1902 – 3 March 1985) was a German writer. His work was part of the literature event in the art competition at the 1928 Summer Olympics.
