= Herbert Wilcox =

British film producer and director (1890–1977)

Herbert Wilcox CBE
- Born: Herbert Sydney Wilcox; 19 April 1890; Norwood, South London, England
- Died: 15 May 1977 (aged 87); London, England
- Occupations: Film producer, film director
- Spouse(s): Dorothy (m. 1916; div. 1917) Maude Bower (m. 1920) Anna Neagle (m. 1943)
- Children: 4

Herbert Sydney Wilcox CBE (19 April 1890 – 15 May 1977) was a British film producer and director.

He was one of the most successful British filmmakers from the 1920s to the 1950s. He is best known for the films he made with his third wife Anna Neagle.

== Early life ==
Wilcox's mother was from County Cork, Ireland, and Wilcox considered himself Irish, but he was born in Norwood, south London. His family moved to Brighton when Wilcox was eight years old; he was one of five children.

His family was poor and Wilcox had to do a number of part-time jobs, including some work as a chorus boy at the local Hippodrome. His mother died of tuberculosis when she was 42. Wilcox left school before the age of fourteen to find work. Shortly afterwards, his father died at the age of 42. Wilcox began earning money as a professional pool player at the Metropole in Camberwell Green.

The First World War broke out and Wilcox enlisted in the British Army. He was training cadets in County Cork when the Easter Rising broke out in 1916 and Wilcox was wounded. He then enlisted in the Royal Flying Corps to earn more money and trained as a pilot. A case of appendicitis kept him away from the front for a time but he wound up serving in France and serving as a flight instructor in England.

== Film career ==
After the war, Wilcox went to work for his brother Charles as a film salesman. He began selling American films to Yorkshire exhibitors, occasionally working with Victor Saville.

=== Astra Films ===
In 1919, Wilcox used his war gratuity to found his own distribution company, Astra Films, in association with his brother and a colleague, Jack Smart. Wilcox contributed £117, and the others made up the rest. It was based in Yorkshire. "Owing to the war, there were practically no British productions", said Wilcox. "They were almost all American films." The company was immediately successful so they expanded into London.

=== Graham-Wilcox Productions ===
Astra had a lot of success with a British film, A Peep Behind the Scenes (1919) so Wilcox decided to produce a British film himself. He raised £1,400 to make The Wonderful Story (1922). It was directed by a Newcastle exhibitor who shared Wilcox's enthusiasm for D. W. Griffith, Jack Graham Cutts; he and Wilcox established Graham-Wilcox Productions. Wilcox sold the film for £4,000 and the premiere got excellent reviews. This enabled Wilcox to raise funds for a slate of films, before The Wonderful Story was released and flopped at the box office.

However the next Graham-Wilcox production, Flames of Passion (1922), starring imported Hollywood star Mae Marsh was a big hit, among the first British films sold to the USA. The success of the film inspired Wilcox to steer away from realistic drama and focus on escapist entertainment.

==== Director ====
Wilcox optioned the screen rights for Chu-Chin-Chow (1923), with imported American star Betty Blythe. The film was shot in Germany at UFA's studios in association with Eric Pommer with a huge budget but was only a moderate success. He followed it with Southern Love (1924), shot in Vienna, again with Blythe. Wilcox launched the film with a mock bull fight in Albert Hall and says the film returned a profit in England alone.

Pommer asked Wilcox to collaborate again and they made Decameron Nights (1924).

Back in Britain he made Paddy the Next Best Thing (1923).

After what he described as a "series of unimpressive films" he made The Only Way (1926), based on a stage play which was based on A Tale of Two Cities.

He followed it with Nell Gwyn (1926), starring Dorothy Gish in the title role. This was a big success around the world.

=== British National Films ===
The world rights to Nell Gwyn were purchased by British National Films, a company established by J.D. Williams, who signed Wilcox and Gish to make three more films, all financed by Paramount: Madame Pompadour (1926), the first film shot at the newly built Elstree Studios; London (1926); and Tip Toes (1927). It was later revealed in a court case that Wilcox's fee was £3,000 a film plus 25% of the profits, but there were no profits for the three films.

=== British and Dominions Film Corporation ===
Wilcox ended up leaving British National and founded the British and Dominions Film Corporation with Nelson Keys with capital of half a million pounds. His first film for them, via Herbert Wilcox Productions, was Mumsie (1927), starring Pauline Frederick and, in his debut, Herbert Marshall.

Wilcox wanted to make another film with Frederick and suggested Noël Coward's The Vortex but Frederick disliked the role. Wilcox instead decided to do a version of the Edith Cavell story, Dawn (1928). Frederick dropped out of the film, and was replaced by Sybil Thorndike. Filming proved difficult but the resulting movie was a big hit. In 1928 British and Dominion Films insured Wilcox for £100,000.

There was some talk he would make a film of the Burke and Wills story. Instead he made what he described as "a series of unimportant but profitable films": The Bondman (1929), The Woman in White (1929),

=== Sound Films ===
Generally, Alfred Hitchcock's Blackmail is regarded as the first film with sound, but Wilcox's Black Waters was trade-shown several weeks earlier in May, 1929.

He produced more than a hundred films, of which he directed about half. "His film production team were never laid off, even during the worst depressions of the British film industry. They were on full salary 52 weeks of the year."

Wilcox built and equipped sound studios next to the British International Pictures studios, which they bought from John Maxwell. Wilcox signed up top stage artists such as Jack Buchanan, Tom Walls and Ralph Lynn and Sydney Howard, with C.B. Cochran and Albert de Courville as producers. He announced plans to make nine talkies.

He produced and directed the first British all talkie ever made, Wolves (1930), with Charles Laughton and Dorothy Gish and produced Canaries Sometimes Sing (1930).

He made an arrangement to produce a series of films in association with His Master's Voice, with the aim of using their celebrity recording stars. Among the films they were to make together were Cochran's Talkie Revue, a film of C.B Cochran's variety show; the play Rookery Nook; an adaptation of the novel The Blue Lagoon, and the life story of Robert Burns.

However their first movie, The Loves of Robert Burns (1930), with Joseph Hislop, was not a success and the arrangement abruptly ended. Wilcox's plans to make The Life of Beethoven and a version of Don Quixote starring Chaliapin had to be cancelled.

Wilcox produced Rookery Nook (1930), an Aldwych farce based on the play by Ben Travers and directed by Tom Walls. It led to a series of Aldwych farces from Travers and Walls.

He acted as producer only on Splinters (1930), high Treason (1930, The Mountain of Mourne (1930), Warned Off (1930), On Approval (1930), Tons of Money (1930), Mischief (1931), The Speckled Band (1931), Plunder (1931), Almost a Divorce (1931), Up for the Cup (1931) with Sydney Howard, The Barton Mystery (1932), Life Goes On (1932), Thark (1932), Leap Year (1932), It's a King (1932),The Love Contract (1932), Say It with Music(1932), The Mayor's Nest (1932), and A Night Like This (1932).

As a director he made The Chance of a Night Time (1931) with Ralph Lynn from a play by Ben Travers; Carnival (1931); and The Blue Danube (1933).

== Anna Neagle ==
Wilcox's professional relationship with Anna Neagle began when he was looking for a leading lady to support Jack Buchanan in Goodnight, Vienna (1932). He decided to cast her after seeing Neagle support Buchanan on stage in a musical Stand Up and Cheer. Goodnight Vienna was Wilcox's biggest success to that time.

He used Neagle again in The Flag Lieutenant (1932) He made some films without her – Money Means Nothing (1932), The King's Cup (1933), General John Regan (1933), The Blarney Stone (1933), The King of Paris (1933), Lord of the Manor (1933), Discord (1933) – then they were reunited on The Little Damozel (1933), a conscious effort on Wilcox's part to ensure that Neagle was not type cast as an "English Rose".

He bought the rights to a John Galsworthy play Loyalties and developed a screenplay. He later sold it to William Fox for a profit. He produced That's a Good Girl (1933).

Bitter Sweet (1933) starred Neagle, based on the operetta by Noël Coward. It was a box office failure.

Yes, Mr Brown (1933) was a vehicle for Jack Buchanan and Lilies of the Field (1934) without her. Wilcox was back to Neagle for The Queen's Affair (1934). He and Neagle had a big hit with a new version of Nell Gwynn (1934). They followed it with Peg of Old Drury (1935).

He also produced Escape Me Never (1935), starring Elisabeth Bergner, which was a surprise box office hit.

=== Herbert Wilcox Productions ===
The success of Peg of Old Drury saw Wilcox approached by Lord Portal to set up his own company, Herbert Wilcox Productions. Wilcox resigned from British Dominion, and set up the new company with C.M. Woolf and J. Arthur Rank. The only other shareholders in the company apart from Wilcox were Woolf and his brother Maurice.

Wilcox, Woolf, Portal and Rank soon established themselves as a major player in the industry by buying Universal Pictures' English operations; Wilcox was appointed to the board to directors of Universal English and the Universal American parent company. He also had shares in a new company, General Cinema Finance, which was to control the distribution and production of films and acquire cinemas. This company would go on to acquire Gaumont British and the Odeon circuit and form the back bone of the Rank Film empire.

Their first film was Street Singer Serenade (1936), aka Limelight, directed by Wilcox with Neagle and Jack Buchanan. It was followed by Fame (1936), which he produced, starring Sydney Howard and new Wilcox discovers Miki Hood and Geraldine Hislop. He and Neagle did a story about trapeze artists, Three Maxims (1936).

He made Where's George? (1936) with Sydney Howard.

Wilcox was back with Buchanan with This'll Make You Whistle (1936). He wanted to make an epic version of The Blue Lagoon with Hollywood stars to be shot mostly on location in Hawaii and a biopic of Lady Hamilton with Neagle but neither was made. Instead he made Millions (1937).

Wilcox's film studio at Elstree burnt down and Wilcox moved to new studios at Pinewood. There he made London Melody (1937) with Neagle.

=== RKO ===
Wilcox wanted to star Neagle in a biopic of Queen Victoria. Woolf refused to finance it, believing it to be a bad investment, so Wilcox raised the bulk of the finance himself. Wilcox invested his entire savings and Neagle put in £10,000. They secured a distribution agreement with RKO. Victoria the Great (1937) was a massive success and led to Wilcox signing a ten-year deal with RKO to help finance and distribute the films.

He and Neagle promptly made a sequel, Sixty Glorious Years (1938). Wilcox produced but did not direct A Royal Divorce (1938) starring Ruth Chatterton. Wilcox announced he would make a biopic of Lord Kitchener but the film was never made.

=== Hollywood ===
He and Neagle went to the US to work for RKO. They looked into making a biopic of Marie Lloyd but could not find a suitable co-star for Neagle so instead made another biopic, Nurse Edith Cavell (1939). They were going to follow it with a biopic of Flora MacDonald filmed in Scotland but the declaration of war made that impossible. Instead they made three musicals: Irene (1940), with Ray Milland; No, No, Nanette (1940), with Victor Mature; and Sunny (1941) with Ray Bolger. They were among the many names who worked on Forever and a Day (1943).

In July 1941, Wilcox and Neagle returned to England to make They Flew Alone (1942) a biopic of Amy Johnson and the war thriller Yellow Canary (1943).

=== The London Films ===
Wilcox and Neagle had a big hit with I Live in Grosvenor Square (1945), co starring Rex Harrison and Dean Jagger. They followed it with Piccadilly Incident (1946), starring Neagle and Michael Wilding, which was even more popular, the second biggest British hit of 1946. Wilcox signed Wilding to a long-term contract.

The Courtneys of Curzon Street (1947) was the most popular film at the British box office in 1947. Another hit was Spring in Park Lane (1948).

Wilding was not in their next film, Elizabeth of Ladymead (1948) but returned for Maytime in Mayfair (1949), a sequel to Spring in Park Lane, and another massive success.

Wilcox and Neagle returned to war stories with Odette (1950) a biopic of Odette Samson starring Neagle and Trevor Howard, and Wilcox's most profitable movie to date. He planned to make a biopic about Van Gogh starring Trevor Howard, but it was never made.

Wilcox made a film without Neagle, Into the Blue (1950), with Wilding and Odile Versois; it was not particularly popular. Neagle and Wilding were reunited for The Lady with a Lamp (1951), a biopic of Florence Nightingale and Derby Day (1952), an ensemble film. Both did well at the box office but not as well as the late 40s films.

=== Margaret Lockwood and Republic Pictures ===
In the early 1950s Neagle had a long running stage hit, The Glorious Years. In November 1951 Wilcox signed a multi picture deal with Margaret Lockwood to make six films in three years. The following year he signed a six-picture deal with Republic Films.

The first movie Lockwood-Wilcox film, Trent's Last Case (1952) was a solid success, helped by a cast including Wilding and Orson Welles. However Laughing Anne (1953), co-starring Forrest Tucker and Wendell Corey, and Trouble in the Glen (1954), with Welles, did poorly and he made no further films with Lockwood or Republic.

Wilcox was further hurt when a film he produced, The Beggar's Opera (1953), was a box office disaster.

=== Errol Flynn and Ivor Novello ===
Wilcox formed a new production company, Everest, and made two musicals with Neagle and Errol Flynn: Lilacs in the Spring (1954), based on The Glorious Years, and King's Rhapsody (1955), based on a musical by Ivor Novello. Both flopped and plans to make a third Novello film, Perchance to Dream did not happen.

=== Last films ===
Wilcox had a hit with My Teenage Daughter (1956), a story of Neagle dealing with a juvenile delinquent daughter played by Sylvia Syms. Less successful was These Dangerous Years (1957), produced by Neagle and directed by Wilcox, starring George Baker and Frankie Vaughan, and no Neagle.

He produced but did not direct a war film, Yangtse Incident (1957), which performed reasonably well at the British box office but ultimately lost money. Wilcox found himself personally liable for some of the film's costs.

He tried a drama with Neagle, The Man Who Wouldn't Talk (1958), and three films with Vaughan: Wonderful Things! (1958), The Heart of a Man (1959), and The Lady Is a Square (1959).

=== Bankruptcy ===
Wilcox was plagued with financial troubles in the 1950s and 1960s. He missed an early opportunity to invest in television; Anna Neagle's chain of dancing schools failed; he and Neagle invested heavily in British Lion shares and the company went into receivership; he borrowed £341,000 from the Edgware Trust; he and Neagle had guaranteed a £75,000 loan to make the two Errol Flynn films; and he paid £100,000 to Terence Rattigan for the film rights to his play Ross only for him to be unable to get it made. His film company failed in the 1960s. He spent two years trying to make a film about King Edward VII but the Queen refused permission. He was declared bankrupt in 1964, owing £16,000 to the Edgware Trust and £134,313 over all.

However, the musical play Charlie Girl, starring his wife Anna Neagle, ran for five years and resolved this financial situation.

Wilcox made some money from writing articles and was discharged as a bankrupt in 1966 after paying about 4 1/2 d in the pound to creditors.

According to one profile "The conventional view of Wilcox is that, despite his eventual bankruptcy, his considerable entrepreneurial skills enabled him to sustain a continued presence over a long period in a notoriously unstable industry; discussion of his directorial qualities usually acknowledges his professionalism but falls short of crediting him with any authorial status."

== Personal life ==
In June 1917, Herbert Wilcox was granted a divorce from his first wife Dorothy, whom he had married on 2 December 1916 at St Luke's (CoE), Brighton. At the time, Herbert Wilcox was a lieutenant in the Royal Flying Corps. His wife was "carrying on a disgraceful intrigue" with an also-married Mr. Stanley Steel. The jury awarded Wilcox damages, possibly shared with Mrs Steel, of £750 plus costs.

In 1920, Wilcox married Maude Bower; they had four children together. Wilcox married his third wife, actress Anna Neagle, on 9 August 1943. The couple remained married until Wilcox's death in 1977, but they had no children.

Prior to his death at the age of 87 in London, England after a long illness, Wilcox donated four Daily Mail National Film Awards to the Glebelands Retirement Home in Wokingham.

Wilcox is buried in the City of London Cemetery.

== Awards ==
In 1937, the Wilcox film Victoria the Great was nominated for the Mussolini Cup at the Venice Film Festival, but lost out to the French film Life Dances On (Un carnet de bal). Wilcox lost the Festival's Best Director award to Robert J. Flaherty and Zoltán Korda for Elephant Boy. However, Victoria the Great and Wilcox won the Festival's Nations Cup for "Best World Premiere".

Wilcox won four Daily Mail National Film Awards.

- 1947 – Best Film – Piccadilly Incident (producer and director)
- 1948 – Best Film – The Courtneys of Curzon Street (producer and director)
- 1949 – Best Film – Spring in Park Lane (producer and director)
- 1951 – Best Film – Odette (producer and director)

== Selected filmography ==
=== Director ===
- Chu-Chin-Chow (1923)
- Southern Love (1924)
- Decameron Nights (1924)
- Nell Gwyn (1926)
- London (1926)
- Mumsie (1927)
- Madame Pompadour (1927)
- Tip Toes (1927)
- The Only Way (1927)
- Dawn (1928)
- The Bondman (1929)
- The Woman in White (1929)
- Splinters (1929)
- The Loves of Robert Burns (1930)
- The Chance of a Night Time (1931)
- Carnival (1931)
- The Blue Danube (1932)
- Good Night, Vienna (1932)
- Money Means Nothing (1932)
- The King's Cup (1932)
- The Little Damozel (1933)
- Bitter Sweet (1933)
- Yes, Mr. Brown (1933)
- The Queen's Affair (1934)
- Nell Gwynn (1934)
- Peg of Old Drury (1935)
- Where's George? (1935)
- Three Maxims (1936)
- This'll Make You Whistle (1936)
- Limelight (1937)
- London Melody (1937)
- Victoria the Great (1937)
- Sixty Glorious Years (1938)
- A Royal Divorce (1938)
- Nurse Edith Cavell (1939)
- No, No, Nanette (1940)
- Irene (1940)
- Sunny (1941)
- They Flew Alone (1942)
- Forever and a Day (1943)
- Yellow Canary (1943)
- I Live in Grosvenor Square (1945)
- Piccadilly Incident (1946)
- The Courtneys of Curzon Street (1947)
- Spring in Park Lane (1948)
- Elizabeth of Ladymead (1948)
- Maytime in Mayfair (1949)
- Odette (1950)
- Into the Blue (1950)
- The Lady with the Lamp (1951)
- Derby Day (1952)
- Trent's Last Case (1952)
- Laughing Anne (1953)
- Trouble in the Glen (1953)
- Lilacs in the Spring 1954)
- King's Rhapsody (1955)
- My Teenage Daughter (1956)
- These Dangerous Years (1957)
- The Man Who Wouldn't Talk (1958)
- Wonderful Things! (1958)
- The Heart of a Man (1959)
- The Lady Is a Square (1959)

=== Producer ===
- The Wonderful Story (1922)
- Paddy the Next Best Thing (1923)
- Warned Off (1930)
- On Approval (1930)
- Tons of Money (1930)
- Plunder (1931)
- The Barton Mystery (1932)
- Life Goes On (1932)
- Say It with Music (1932)
- Thark (1932)
- Leap Year (1932)
- A Night Like This (1932)
- The Flag Lieutenant (1932)
- General John Regan (1933)
- The Blarney Stone (1933)
- Lord of the Manor (1933)
- Discord (1933)
- Lilies of the Field (1934)
- Fame (1936)
- Millions (1937)

== Bibliography ==
- Harper, Sue & Porter, Vincent. British Cinema of the 1950s: The Decline of Deference. Oxford University Press, 2007.
- Wilcox, Herbert Sidney, Twenty-Five Thousand Sunsets – autobiography, 1967 (first American edition 1969)
