= Nell Gwyn (1934 film) =

- Directed by: Herbert Wilcox
- Written by: Miles Malleson
- Produced by: Herbert Wilcox
- Starring: Anna Neagle; Cedric Hardwicke; Jeanne de Casalis; Miles Malleson; Moore Marriott
- Cinematography: Freddie Young (as F.A. Young)
- Edited by: Merrill G. White
- Music by: Philip Braham
- Production company: Herbert Wilcox Productions (for) British & Dominions Film Corporation
- Distributed by: United Artists
- Release date: 1 August 1934 (London)
- Running time: 85 minutes
- Country: United Kingdom
- Language: English

Nell Gwyn (also known as Mistress Nell Gwynne, Nell Gwynn, and Nell Gwynne) is a 1934 British historical comedy-drama film directed by Herbert Wilcox and starring Anna Neagle, Cedric Hardwicke, Jeanne de Casalis, Miles Malleson and Moore Marriott. In the film's opening credits, the dialogue is credited to "King Charles II, Samuel Pepys and Nell Gwyn" with additional dialogue by Miles Malleson. The film portrays the historical romance between Charles II of England and the actress Nell Gwyn.

== Plot ==
King Charles II meets Nell Gwyn at Drury Lane Theatre, and she becomes his mistress. Following her victory in a struggle with the Duchess of Portsmouth, Nell remains the kling's favourite for the rest of his life.

== Cast ==
- Anna Neagle as Nell Gwyn
- Cedric Hardwicke as Charles II
- Jeanne de Casalis as Duchess of Portsmouth
- Muriel George as Meg
- Helena Pickard as Mrs. Pepys
- Dorothy Robinson as Mrs. Knipp
- Esmé Percy as Samuel Pepys
- Miles Malleson as Chiffinch
- Moore Marriott as Robin
- Craighall Sherry as Ben
- Lawrence Anderson as James, Duke of York

== Production ==
Wilcox had enjoyed a big success with the Nell Gwynn story in 1926 with Dorothy Gish and decided to remake it with Anna Neagle. Part of the finance was raised by United Artists. The film encountered censorship difficulties in the US, insisting on the deletion of some scenes and addition of others, including a marriage between James and Nell, and an ending where Nell winds up in the gutter.

== Reception ==
According to Wilcox, the film flopped in the US but was a big success in the rest of the world. Film Weekly reported it was the third most popular film in Britain in 1935.

Kine Weekly wrote: "Although the treatment is fashioned mainly in the successful 'Henry VIII' tradition, the picture relies more upon broadness than subtlety for its appeal. The dialogue contains a good deal of cockney English and this tends to jar rather, in spite of the otherwise excellent atmosphere. It is perhaps justified, for its crisp repartee will wring laughter from the masses."

The Daily Film Renter wrote: "Anna Neagle gives vigorous portrayal in title role, Sir Cedric Hardwicke making an excellent Charles II. Definitely very good popular entertainment, and likely to do big box-office business. Although this film opens with the initial meeting of King Charles and Mistress Nell, and concludes with the passing of the Merry Monarch, it gives no more than a cursory survey of the intervening period. Rather does the action concentrate on the high-spirited vulgarities of the orange girl who became a power behind the throne, via the stage of Old Drury."

Graham Greene wrote, "I have seen few things more attractive than Miss Neagle in breeches."
