= List of highest-grossing films in the United Kingdom =

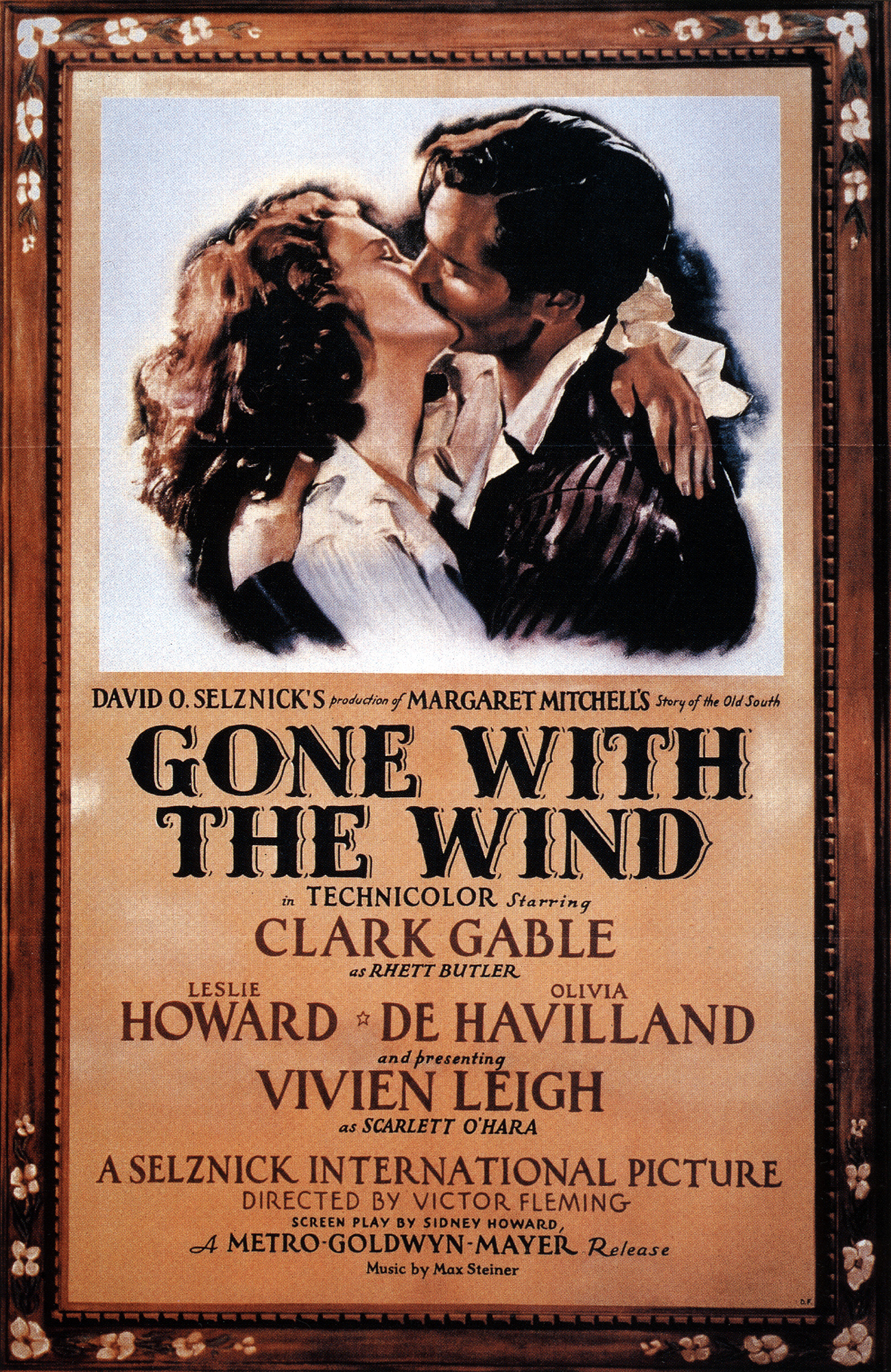
Gone with the Wind has generated the most admissions at cinemas in the United Kingdom.

This list charts the most successful films at cinemas in the United Kingdom (a box office territory that also includes Republic of Ireland), by box office sales in pounds sterling and admissions. An overview of the top-earning films and record-holders is provided, as well as the highest-grossing British productions, the most successful non-English-language films and the sound films that have generated the most admissions. A summary of the most popular films over the course of the last century is also included.

American productions dominate, with all films earning over £50 million at the box office either completely or partly produced by Hollywood studios. British film is well represented, with about half the films on the list qualifying as British productions; however, due to the globalization of the film industry most successful British productions since the start of the twenty-first century have been co-produced with other countries. While there is no universally accepted definition of a film's nationality, a legal definition for the Britishness of a film has existed in UK law since 2007, and this is the criteria used here. For films made prior to 2007, the nationalities listed by the sources supplying the data are used where they are given.

The 2015 Star Wars film, The Force Awakens, is the highest-grossing film in terms of nominal box-office sales. The effects of inflation are a significant contributing factor to recent films surpassing the box-office records of older films, so when considering the number of admissions Gone with the Wind (1940) is the most successful film, although this was achieved over several release cycles prior to the home video era.

== Highest-grossing films by box-office revenue ==
=== Top earning films ===
The highest earners at the box-office are mostly American films and UK-US co-productions. Sequels, remakes and adaptations dominate, with seven films in the Harry Potter franchise, six films in the Marvel Cinematic Universe, five Star Wars instalments, the five Daniel Craig James Bond films and Peter Jackson's first four Tolkien adaptations having earned in excess of £50 million. This table only charts films released since 1989, but due to inflation it is unlikely anything released prior to then will surpass the films on the list in nominal terms.

Films with earnings over £50 million since 1989
Rank	Title	Gross (£ million)	Year
1 (United Kingdom) *	Star Wars: The Force Awakens	123.3	2015
2 (United Kingdom) *	Skyfall	102.8	2012
3 (United Kingdom) *	Spider-Man: Brand New Day †	100.3	2026
4 (United Kingdom) *	No Time to Die	98.0	2021
5	Spider-Man: No Way Home	97.2	2021
6	Avatar	96.7	2009
7 (United Kingdom) *	Barbie	95.7	2023
8 (United Kingdom) *	Spectre	95.2	2015
9 (United Kingdom) *	Avengers: Endgame †	95.1 (Note: The gross for Avengers: Endgame includes revenue of £88.7 from the original release in 2019, and a further £6.4 million from the 2026 Encore reissue.)	2019
10 (United Kingdom) *	The Odyssey †	88.7	2026
11	Top Gun: Maverick	83.8	2022
12 (United Kingdom) *	Star Wars: The Last Jedi	82.7	2017
13	Titanic	82.7 (Note: The gross for Titanic also includes revenue from the 2012 and 2023 re-releases.)	1998
14	Avatar: The Way of Water	77.7 (Note: The gross for Avatar: The Way of Water also includes revenue from the 2025 re-release.)	2022
15 (United Kingdom) *	The Lion King	76.0	2019
16	Toy Story 3	74.1	2010
17 (United Kingdom) *	Harry Potter and the Deathly Hallows – Part 2	73.2	2011
18 (United Kingdom) *	Beauty and the Beast	72.5	2017
19 (United Kingdom) *	Avengers: Infinity War	70.8	2018
20 (United Kingdom) *	Mamma Mia! †	69.1	2008
21 (United Kingdom) *	Harry Potter and the Philosopher's Stone	67.1	2001
22	Toy Story 4	66.2	2019
23 (United Kingdom) *	Rogue One: A Star Wars Story	66.1	2016
24 (United Kingdom) *	Mamma Mia! Here We Go Again	65.6	2018
25	Jurassic World	64.5	2015
26 (United Kingdom) *	Casino Royale	64.1 (Note: The gross for Casino Royale also includes revenue of £8,434,000 from a staging of the film by Secret Cinema as a live cinema experience, and £51,000 from a re-release in 2022.)	2006
27 (United Kingdom) *	Wonka	63.5	2023
28	The Lord of the Rings: The Fellowship of the Ring	63.0	2001
29 (United Kingdom) *	Wicked †	61.4	2024
30	The Lord of the Rings: The Return of the King	61.1	2003
31	Inside Out 2	59.5	2024
32	Oppenheimer	58.9	2023
33	Toy Story 5 †	58.4	2026
34 (United Kingdom) *	Star Wars: The Rise of Skywalker	58.3	2019
35	Joker	57.9	2019
36 (United Kingdom) *	Deadpool & Wolverine	57.8	2024
37	The Lord of the Rings: The Two Towers	57.6	2002
38 (United Kingdom) *	Dunkirk †	56.9	2017
39	A Minecraft Movie	56.9	2025
40 (United Kingdom) *	The Dark Knight Rises	56.5	2012
41	Star Wars: Episode I – The Phantom Menace	56.4	1999
42	Incredibles 2	56.2	2018
43 (United Kingdom) *	Bohemian Rhapsody	55.4	2018
44 (United Kingdom) *	Harry Potter and the Chamber of Secrets	55.0	2002
45	The Super Mario Bros. Movie	54.9	2023
46 (United Kingdom) *	Fantastic Beasts and Where to Find Them	54.7	2016
47	Frozen II	53.5	2019
48	Michael †	53.0	2026
49 (United Kingdom) *	Harry Potter and the Deathly Hallows – Part 1	52.6	2010
50	Pirates of the Caribbean: Dead Man's Chest	52.6	2006
51	The Hobbit: An Unexpected Journey	52.3	2012
52 (United Kingdom) *	The Full Monty	52.2	1997
53	Marvel Avengers Assemble	51.9	2012
54 (United Kingdom) *	Quantum of Solace	51.2	2008
55 (United Kingdom) *	Harry Potter and the Half-Blood Prince	50.9	2009
56	Black Panther	50.7	2018
57 (United Kingdom) *	Harry Potter and the Order of the Phoenix	50.0	2007
Films marked as (United Kingdom) * are classified as UK-qualifying productions by the British Film Institute. † indicates the film's gross has increased since January 2026.

=== Record-holders ===
As many as fifteen films may have held the record of "highest-grossing film" in Post-war Britain. Emerging from the Second World War in 1945, Gone with the Wind is generally accepted to have been the record-holder, retaining the top spot until 1962 when it was surpassed by South Pacific. South Pacific was comprehensively beaten four years later in 1966 by another musical, The Sound of Music, which trebled the earnings of its predecessor. Regular tracking of box-office performance only started in 1975, so it is only possible to chart the transition of the record with any serious degree of accuracy within this period. It is possible that some of the earlier films in the chart did not surpass the box office of The Sound of Music, and it may have retained the record until the release of E.T. the Extra-Terrestrial. (Note: It is not known exactly how much The Sound of Music grossed at the box office, since accurate records were not maintained at the time. Hall and Neale (2010) states that the "foreign" rentals (the distributor's share of the box office outside of the US market after deducting the exhibitor's cut) were as high as $50 million, with approximately half coming from Britain alone. The film was the top money-maker of the year for four consecutive years between 1965 and 1968, during which time the US dollar to pound sterling exchange rate was approximately $2.68 to £1 averaged over the four years, meaning $25 million would translate to roughly £9.3 million. This estimate is consistent with Roger Manvell's (the first director of the British Film Academy), who estimated its earnings as of 1968 at over £7 million. 20th Century Fox collected roughly two-thirds of the gross, so rentals of £7–10 million would equate to an exhibition gross of £10–15 million.)

Skyfall, the twenty-third James Bond film in the long-running Eon series, became the first film to gross over £100 million in setting a new record at the box office. All the record-holders since tracking began have been either partially or fully produced by Americans, although The Full Monty, Mamma Mia!, Skyfall and Star Wars: The Force Awakens were UK–US collaborations. Only the grosses that set records are included in the timeline; earnings from subsequent re-releases after the film conceded the record are omitted.

Timeline of the highest-grossing film record since 1975
Year of record^{#}	Title	Record setting gross (£ million)
1975	Jaws	11.8
1977	Star Wars	14.4
1978	Grease	14.7
1982	E.T. the Extra-Terrestrial	21.7
1990	Ghost	23.3
1993	Jurassic Park	47.9
1998 (United Kingdom) *	The Full Monty	52.2
1998	Titanic	69.0
2008 (United Kingdom) *	Mamma Mia! (Note: According to earlier BFI Yearbooks Mamma Mia! earned £69.2 million, beating the £69.0 million earned by Titanic, but more recently the British Film Institute has revised the gross to £68.6 million. If the revised estimate is correct and the original gross for Titanic is not subject to any revision then Mamma Mia! would not have assumed the record.)	68.6/69.2
2010	Avatar	94.0
2012 (United Kingdom) *	Skyfall	102.8
2016 (United Kingdom) *	Star Wars: The Force Awakens	123.3
Films marked as (United Kingdom) * are classified as UK-qualifying productions by the British Film Institute. † indicates the film's gross has increased since January 2025.^{#} Year of release is used between 1975 and 1990 because it is not known in which year the film set a new record.

=== British productions ===
Since 2007, under UK law films can qualify as British via a cultural test (set out by the Cultural Test for Film, High-end Television and Video Games Regulations), an official bilateral co-production agreement, or under the European Convention on Cinematographic Co-production.

The Cultural Test for Film, High-end Television and Video Games Regulations, was introduced under the Finance Act 2006 and came into force on January 1, 2007. The regulations set out a points-based system to determine whether a film, high-end television programme or video game qualifies as a "British film" or "British programme" and is therefore eligible for UK tax relief. The test takes account of cultural content, creative elements and heritage, the nationality of the cast and crew and where the bulk of the production takes place. The application of this process can draw to counter-intuitive conclusions; films not classified as British under this system may have British elements, such as being based on books by British authors and featuring British actors—as was the case with The Hobbit trilogy—while films that are regarded as quintessentially American—such as Star Wars: The Force Awakens or The Dark Knight—can result in being classified as British.

The most successful British productions in the modern marketplace generally have American investment, with The King's Speech and The Inbetweeners Movie the only fully British films to have earned in excess of £40 million. Sequels, remakes and adaptations still dominate; the remaining films—with the exception of The Full Monty—are biographical or based on historical events. The King's Speech replaces Star Wars: The Force Awakens as the most successful British production if the criterion is restricted to solely British-produced films.

UK-qualifying productions with earnings over £40 million since 1989
Rank	Title	Gross (£ million)	Year
1	Star Wars: The Force Awakens	123.3	2015
2	Skyfall	102.8	2012
3	Spider-Man: Brand New Day †	100.3	2026
4	No Time to Die	98.0	2021
5	Barbie	95.7	2023
6	Spectre	95.2	2015
7	Avengers: Endgame †	95.1	2019
8	The Odyssey †	88.7	2026
9	Star Wars: The Last Jedi	82.7	2017
10	The Lion King	76.0	2019
11	Harry Potter and the Deathly Hallows – Part 2	73.2	2011
12	Beauty and the Beast	72.5	2017
13	Avengers: Infinity War	70.8	2018
14	Mamma Mia! †	69.1	2008
15	Harry Potter and the Philosopher's Stone	67.1	2001
16	Rogue One: A Star Wars Story	66.1	2016
17	Mamma Mia! Here We Go Again	65.6	2018
18	Casino Royale	64.1	2006
19	Wonka	63.5	2023
20	Wicked †	61.4	2024
21	Star Wars: The Rise of Skywalker	58.3	2019
22	Deadpool & Wolverine	57.8	2024
23	Dunkirk †	56.9	2017
24	The Dark Knight Rises	56.5	2012
25	Bohemian Rhapsody	55.4	2018
26	Harry Potter and the Chamber of Secrets	55.0	2002
27	Fantastic Beasts and Where to Find Them	54.7	2016
28	Harry Potter and the Deathly Hallows – Part 1	52.6	2011
29	The Full Monty	52.2	1997
30	Quantum of Solace	51.2	2008
31	Harry Potter and the Half-Blood Prince	50.9	2009
32	Harry Potter and the Order of the Phoenix	50.0	2007
33	The Dark Knight	49.8	2008
34	Harry Potter and the Goblet of Fire	49.3	2005
35	Avengers: Age of Ultron	48.3	2015
36	Bridget Jones's Baby	48.2	2016
37	Wicked: For Good †	47.2	2025
38	Bridget Jones: Mad About the Boy	46.4	2025
39	The Jungle Book	46.3	2016
40	Harry Potter and the Prisoner of Azkaban	46.3	2004
41 (United Kingdom)	The King's Speech	45.7	2011
42 (United Kingdom)	The Inbetweeners Movie	45.0	2011
43	Mary Poppins Returns	44.6	2018
44	1917	44.1	2019
45	Paddington 2	42.7	2017
46	Doctor Strange in the Multiverse of Madness	42.2	2022
47	Bridget Jones's Diary	42.1	2001
48	Jurassic World: Fallen Kingdom	41.6	2018
49	Les Misérables	40.8	2013
50	The Batman	40.8	2022
Films marked as (United Kingdom) are classified as British by the British Film Institute. All other films are UK-qualifying productions. † indicates the film's gross has increased since January 2026.

British films with earnings over £10 million since 1989
Rank	Title	Gross (£ million)	Year
1	The King's Speech	45.7	2011
2	The Inbetweeners Movie	45.0	2011
3	The Inbetweeners 2	33.4	2014
4	Slumdog Millionaire	31.7	2009
5	Four Weddings and a Funeral	27.8	1994
6	Belfast	15.6	2022
7	Yesterday	14.0	2019
8	Trainspotting	12.4	1996
9	St Trinian's	12.3	2007
10	Shirley Valentine	11.3 (Note: The British Film Institute calculated that Shirley Valentine had grossed £21.9 million, adjusted to 2016 prices using the HM Treasury UK GDP deflator. The index is inverted to reverse the process and deflate the adjusted gross back to 1989 levels.)	1989
11	Philomena	11.1	2013
12	Kevin & Perry Go Large	10.5	2000
13	East Is East	10.4	1999
14	Victoria & Abdul	10.1	2017
All films are classified as British by the British Film Institute. † indicates the film's gross has increased since January 2026.

=== Non-English-language films ===
The South Korean film Parasite, winner in the Best Film Not in the English Language category at the 73rd British Academy Film Awards, is the highest-grossing non-English-language film. Chinese and Spanish films are the most represented among high performers in the twenty-first century, with three entries apiece among the top ten non-English-language films. Mel Gibson has directed two films—both featuring dead languages—in the top ten, with The Passion of the Christ in second place and Apocalypto at fifth.

Top ten non-English-language films of the twenty-first century
Rank	Title	Language	Gross (£ million)	Year
1	Parasite	Korean	12.12	2019
2	The Passion of the Christ	Aramaic/Latin/Hebrew	11.08	2004
3	Crouching Tiger, Hidden Dragon	Mandarin	9.37	2001
4	Demon Slayer: Kimetsu No Yaiba Infinity Castle	Japanese	6.59	2025
5	Amélie	French	5.01	2001
6	Dhurandhar: The Revenge †	Hindi	4.29	2026
7	Pathaan	Hindi	4.17	2022
8	Apocalypto	Mayan	4.11	2007
9	Hero	Mandarin	3.82	2004
10	House of Flying Daggers	Mandarin	3.78	2004
† indicates the film's gross has increased since January 2026.

== Highest-grossing films by box-office admissions ==
Up to and including 2003, the British Film Institute (BFI) estimated that fifty-two sound films have generated over 10 million admissions. The European Audiovisual Observatory (Lumiere) have been tracking UK admissions since 1996 and, as of 2025, they estimate that twenty-eight films have generated over 10 million admissions in that period. Due to conflicting estimates during the overlapping period, both sets of figures are presented together here in chronological order. While the two datasets are generally consistent with each other, the estimates from LUMIERE are on average slightly lower than those from the BFI, leading to Bridget Jones's Diary being included in the BFI dataset but excluded from the LUMIERE one. The largest discrepancy is in the estimates for Harry Potter and the Philosopher's Stone; there is a difference of 5 million admissions, but Lumiere do not include any UK data for 2002 even though they do for other countries, which may explain the shortfall.

Re-releases also exacerbate the differences in some cases: both Star Wars Episode I and Titanic were successfully re-released in 2012, and while the LUMIERE dataset includes admissions from the reissues the BFI chart does not. While The Lion King did not generate 10 million admissions during its original release, it may have accumulated 10 million admissions due to a re-release: according to the BFI, it had generated over 8 million admissions during its first run in 1994, and LUMIERE estimate it generated another 2 million with its 2011 reissue. If Bridget Jones and The Lion King are included, as of 2025, seventy-one sound films in total have generated over 10 million admissions at UK cinemas.

Sound films with over 10 million admissions
Year	Title	Admissions (millions)		Ref(s)
Year	Title	BFI	LUMIERE (Note: Prior to the United Kingdom leaving the European Union, the Lumiere database combined admissions for the United Kingdom and Republic of Ireland. Following the UK's exit from the EU, Lumiere decoupled the British admissions from the Irish admissions, reflecting the fact that the Republic of Ireland remains in the EU. This has resulted in three different totals: the combined total (GB_IE) for admissions in the two territories prior to Brexit, and individual totals for the UK (GB) and Republic of Ireland (IE) post-Brexit. Some films are represented by three different totals in some instances, where a pre-Brexit film had admissions in both periods. To maintain consistency throughout the chart—and also with the British Film Institute continuing to treat the UK and Ireland as a single territory—the British and Irish totals are added together and continue to be treated as a single territory.)	Ref(s)
1938	Snow White and the Seven Dwarfs	28.00		
1940	Gone with the Wind	35.00		
1942	Mrs. Miniver	10.20		
1943	Random Harvest	12.00		
1944	(United Kingdom) Fanny by Gaslight	11.70		
1945	(United Kingdom) The Wicked Lady	18.40		
1945	(United Kingdom) The Seventh Veil	17.90		
1945	(United Kingdom) I Live in Grosvenor Square	10.30		
1946	The Bells of St. Mary's	15.20		
1946	(United Kingdom) Piccadilly Incident	11.50		
1947	The Best Years of Our Lives	20.40		
1947	(United Kingdom) The Courtneys of Curzon Street	15.90		
1947	The Jolson Story	11.60		
1948	(United Kingdom) Spring in Park Lane	20.50		
1949	(United Kingdom) The Third Man	14.00		
1950	(United Kingdom) The Blue Lamp	13.30		
1951	The Great Caruso	12.40		
1952	The Greatest Show on Earth	13.00		
1954	(United Kingdom) Doctor in the House	12.20		
1956	The Ten Commandments	15.00		
1957	(United Kingdom) * The Bridge on the River Kwai	12.60		
1958	South Pacific	16.50		
1959	(United Kingdom) Carry On Nurse	10.40		
1960	Ben Hur	13.20		
1961	(United Kingdom) * The Guns of Navarone	11.40		
1964	Mary Poppins	14.00		
1964	(United Kingdom) Goldfinger	13.90		
1965	The Sound of Music	30.00		
1965	(United Kingdom) Thunderball	15.60		
1966	(United Kingdom) * Doctor Zhivago	11.20		
1968	The Jungle Book	19.80		
1972	The Godfather	11.00		
1974	The Sting	11.08		
1975	Jaws	16.20		
1975	The Towering Inferno	11.78		
1977	(United Kingdom) The Spy Who Loved Me	12.46		
1978	Star Wars	20.76		
1978	Grease	17.20		
1978	(United Kingdom) Superman	10.19		
1982	E.T. the Extra-Terrestrial	13.13		
1993	Jurassic Park	16.10		
1994	The Lion King	8.08 (1994)	2.15 (reissues)	
1996	Independence Day	10.79	10.58	
1997	(United Kingdom) * The Full Monty (Note: The British Film Institute and European Audiovisual Observatory disagree over the national classification of The Full Monty. The BFI considers it a British-American co-production while the Observatory regards it as a solo British effort. The BFI designation is used here for consistency.)	14.19	11.10	
1998	Titanic	18.91	18.96	
1999	Star Wars: Episode I – The Phantom Menace	13.59	12.84	
2000	Toy Story 2	12.18	10.32	
2001	(United Kingdom) * Harry Potter and the Philosopher's Stone	17.56	12.62	
2001	The Lord of the Rings: The Fellowship of the Ring	15.98	15.34	
2001	(United Kingdom) * Bridget Jones's Diary	10.15	9.73	
2002	The Lord of the Rings: The Two Towers	14.40	12.38	
2002	(United Kingdom) * Harry Potter and the Chamber of Secrets	14.18	12.29	
2003	The Lord of the Rings: The Return of the King	15.22	11.64	
2004	Shrek 2		10.72	
2004	(United Kingdom) * Harry Potter and the Prisoner of Azkaban		10.29	
2005	(United Kingdom) * Harry Potter and the Goblet of Fire		10.43	
2006	Pirates of the Caribbean: Dead Man's Chest		10.78	
2006	(United Kingdom) * Casino Royale		11.62	
2008	(United Kingdom) * Mamma Mia!		13.39	
2009	Avatar (Note: The British Film Institute and European Audiovisual Observatory disagree over the national classification of Avatar. Since 2007, a legal definition exists for whether a film is British, and Avatar does not meet the criteria. The Observatory uses its own methodology and reverses this categorization, classifying Avatar as a British-American co-production The BFI designation is used here for consistency.)		16.86	
2010	Toy Story 3		12.64	
2011	(United Kingdom) * Harry Potter and the Deathly Hallows – Part 2		12.09	
2012	(United Kingdom) * Skyfall		16.15	
2015	(United Kingdom) * Spectre		13.32	
2015	(United Kingdom) * Star Wars: The Force Awakens (Note: The British Film Institute and European Audiovisual Observatory disagree over the national classifications of some of the UK-produced Disney films. Since 2007, a legal definition exists for whether a film is British, with The Force Awakens, The Last Jedi and Avengers: Endgame meeting the UK-qualifying criteria. The BFI designations are used here for consistency.)		17.28	
2017	(United Kingdom) * Star Wars: The Last Jedi		11.14	
2019	(United Kingdom) * Avengers: Endgame		12.49	
2021	(United Kingdom) * No Time to Die		13.23	
2021	Spider-Man: No Way Home		13.15	
2022	Top Gun: Maverick		10.86	
2023	(United Kingdom) * Barbie		12.06	
Films marked as (United Kingdom) are classified as British by the accompanying source. Films marked as (United Kingdom) * are classified as UK-qualifying productions by the British Film Institute.

== Most popular films ==
Most successful films

Highest-grossing

- Film – Star Wars: The Force Awakens
- British co-production – The Force Awakens
- British film – The King's Speech
- Non-British – Spider-Man: No Way Home
- Non-English language – Parasite
- Animated – The Lion King (2019)

Admissions

- Film – Gone with the Wind
- British silent film – The Battle of the Somme
- British sound film – Spring in Park Lane
- Animated – Snow White and the Seven Dwarfs

=== Overview of the twentieth century ===
In 2004, the British Film Institute published a list charting sound films that generated the most admissions at cinemas in the United Kingdom. The list is reproduced here ranking the top fifty films released in the UK throughout the twentieth century, defined as covering the period from 1 January 1901 until 31 December 2000. The later films that appear on the BFI list—2001 onwards—are omitted from this chart for the purpose of providing an overview of the century. The second table ranks British sound productions from the twentieth century, five of which are co-productions with other countries.

Market conditions, industry practices, demographic and cultural shifts have all impacted on cinema attendance throughout the century. Cinemagoing steadily rose during the 1930s with the arrival of sound and peaked in the 1940s, with 1946 setting a record of over 1,635 million annual admissions; roughly equivalent to thirty visits to the cinema per capita. Attendance dropped off after the Second World War, mainly due to the rising popularity of television. The decline of the cinema was compounded by the rise of home video in the 1980s and reached an all-time low of 54 million admissions in 1984. With declining attendance came the closure of many cinemas; a trend that was not reversed until the birth of the multiplex in the late 1980s, with annual cinema admissions climbing back up to around 176 million in 2002. As expected, the 1940s—when cinema attendance was at an all-time high—is the most represented decade on the chart accounting for nearly a third of all entries, while the 1980s—when attendance was at its lowest—is the least represented post-war decade. However, the disparity between the two extremes is not as great as the overall attendance figures suggest due to the fact that vastly more titles were distributed in the 1940s.

When comparing the films in the chart, several trends emerge. British films account for half the entries during the 1940s—as opposed to just one entry in the last twenty years of the century—due in part to the British government imposing quota caps on foreign features, as well as the inherent difficulties in importing films during the Second World War. With so many men away on national service, films that performed well were also heavily skewed toward female audiences, exemplified by no fewer than four films headlined by Anna Neagle during this period. Prior to the 1980s when home video became popular, there was also a lot more repeat viewing, with some films during the 1950s and '60s enjoying extended runs—sometimes lasting up to several years—as roadshows. A film's content can also have a prohibitive effect on its success: most films in the chart are either family or children's films, with only two films (The Godfather and A Clockwork Orange) carrying an X rating or its replacement, the 18 classification, denying entry to minors.

Overall, Gone with the Wind has generated the most admissions at the UK box office with 35 million and Spring in Park Lane is the most successful British sound film with 20 million, while 1938's Snow White and the Seven Dwarfs is the oldest film in the chart with 28 million admissions. While the chart does not take into account silent films, 1916's The Battle of the Somme is generally regarded to be the most successful film of the silent era, with over 20 million admissions.

Top fifty sound films of the twentieth century
Rank	Title	Admissions (millions)	Year
1	Gone with the Wind	35.00	1940
2	The Sound of Music	30.00	1965
3	Snow White and the Seven Dwarfs	28.00	1938
4	Star Wars	20.76	1978
5 (United Kingdom)	Spring in Park Lane	20.50	1948
6	The Best Years of Our Lives	20.40	1947
7	The Jungle Book	19.80	1968
8	Titanic	18.91	1998
9 (United Kingdom)	The Wicked Lady	18.40	1945
10 (United Kingdom)	The Seventh Veil	17.90	1945
11	Grease	17.20	1978
12	South Pacific	16.50	1958
13	Jaws	16.20	1975
14	Jurassic Park	16.10	1993
15 (United Kingdom)	The Courtneys of Curzon Street	15.90	1947
16 (United Kingdom)	Thunderball	15.60	1965
17	The Bells of St. Mary's	15.20	1946
18	The Ten Commandments	15.00	1956
19 (United Kingdom) *	The Full Monty	14.19	1997
20	Mary Poppins	14.00	1964
21 (United Kingdom)	The Third Man	14.00	1949
22 (United Kingdom)	Goldfinger	13.90	1964
23	Star Wars: Episode I – The Phantom Menace	13.59	1999
24 (United Kingdom)	The Blue Lamp	13.30	1950
25	Ben Hur	13.20	1959
26	E.T. the Extra-Terrestrial	13.13	1982
27	The Greatest Show on Earth	13.00	1952
28 (United Kingdom) *	The Bridge on the River Kwai	12.60	1957
29 (United Kingdom)	The Spy Who Loved Me	12.46	1977
30	The Great Caruso	12.40	1951
31 (United Kingdom)	Doctor in the House	12.20	1954
32	Toy Story 2 (Note: The twentieth century is defined to be the period from 1 January 1901 up to 31 December 2000. However, the common perception is that the century ended on 31 December 1999—coinciding with the millennium celebrations—and if Toy Story 2 is discounted on this basis, then One Flew Over the Cuckoo's Nest (1976) would occupy the fiftieth place in the chart with 9.65 million admissions.)	12.18	2000
33	Random Harvest	12.00	1943
34	The Towering Inferno	11.78	1975
35 (United Kingdom)	Fanny by Gaslight	11.70	1944
36	The Jolson Story	11.60	1947
37 (United Kingdom)	Piccadilly Incident	11.50	1946
38 (United Kingdom) *	The Guns of Navarone	11.40	1961
39 (United Kingdom) *	Doctor Zhivago	11.20	1966
40	The Sting	11.08	1974
41	The Godfather	11.00	1972
42	Independence Day	10.79	1996
43 (United Kingdom)	Carry On Nurse	10.40	1959
44 (United Kingdom)	I Live in Grosvenor Square	10.30	1945
45	Mrs. Miniver	10.20	1942
46 (United Kingdom)	Superman	10.19	1978
47 (United Kingdom)	A Clockwork Orange	9.90	1971
48	Crocodile Dundee	9.80	1986
49	Men in Black	9.73	1997
50	For Whom the Bell Tolls	9.70	1944
Films marked as (United Kingdom) are classified as British by the British Film Institute. Films marked as (United Kingdom) * are classified as UK-qualifying productions.

Top twenty-five British productions
Rank	Title	Admissions (millions)	Year
1	Spring in Park Lane	20.50	1948
2	The Wicked Lady	18.40	1945
3	The Seventh Veil	17.90	1945
4	The Courtneys of Curzon Street	15.90	1947
5	Thunderball	15.60	1965
6 (United Kingdom) *	The Full Monty	14.19	1997
7	The Third Man	14.00	1949
8	Goldfinger	13.90	1964
9	The Blue Lamp	13.30	1950
10 (United Kingdom) *	The Bridge on the River Kwai	12.60	1957
11	The Spy Who Loved Me	12.46	1977
12	Doctor in the House	12.20	1954
13	Fanny by Gaslight	11.70	1944
14	Piccadilly Incident	11.50	1946
15 (United Kingdom) *	The Guns of Navarone	11.40	1961
16 (United Kingdom) *	Doctor Zhivago	11.20	1966
17	Carry On Nurse	10.40	1959
18	I Live in Grosvenor Square	10.30	1945
19	Superman	10.19	1978
20	A Clockwork Orange	9.90	1971
21 (United Kingdom) *	Moonraker	9.41	1979
22	I'm All Right Jack	9.40	1959
23	49th Parallel	9.30	1941
24	Live and Let Die	9.00	1973
25	Oliver!	8.90	1968
Films marked as (United Kingdom) * are classified as UK-qualifying productions by the British Film Institute. All other films are classified as British.

=== Overview of the twenty-first century ===
Film series and adaptations have been the highest earners in the twenty-first century, with only two films—Avatar in 2009 and 1917 in 2020—that are not adapted from a pre-existing property or a sequel emerging as the highest-grossing film of the year. Since the British Film Institute does not regularly track admissions, the only complete metric available for assessing a film's success is the box office revenue, and over a period of time inflation of the currency becomes a key factor when comparing the relative success of films. Ticket prices rose rapidly at the beginning of the twenty-first century, with the average cost increasing by over 80 per cent since 2000. To this end it is useful to adjust the box office gross for inflation, so a chart ranking films by the real value of their earnings is provided alongside a chart of the years' biggest films.

After recalculating the grosses using the HM Treasury UK GDP deflator, Star Wars: The Force Awakens remains the most successful film of the twenty-first century. Other high-performing series include Harry Potter—which topped the year on four occasions—and James Bond, which has three films in the adjusted top ten. The top ten British productions adjusted for inflation are all international co-productions, seven of which are Star Wars, James Bond and Harry Potter films. If the criterion is restricted to solely British-produced films, The King's Speech is the most successful British production.

Top ten films of the twenty-first century adjusted for inflation (Note: Historically, the British Film Institute used to publish an inflation adjusted list, using the HM Treasury UK GDP deflator. However, the BFI has not updated the list since 2018, so it has been brought up to date using Wikipedia's built-in inflation template, as of 2024, using the same index. The adjustment is applied to the BFI's 2018 list, and from the appropriate year index for later releases.)
Rank	Title	Adjusted gross (£ million)	Year
1 (United Kingdom) *	Star Wars: The Force Awakens	164.5	2015
2 (United Kingdom) *	Skyfall	143.4	2012
3	Avatar	137.2	2009
4 (United Kingdom) *	Spectre	127.0	2015
5 (United Kingdom) *	Harry Potter and the Philosopher’s Stone	116.2	2001
6 (United Kingdom) *	No Time to Die	115.0	2021
7	Spider-Man: No Way Home	114.0	2021
8	The Lord of the Rings: The Fellowship of the Ring	111.6	2001
9 (United Kingdom) *	Avengers: Endgame	109.2 (Note: The adjusted gross for Avengers: Endgame only includes the £88.7 million earned from the original 2019 release, and does not include revenue from the 2026 Encore reissue.)	2019
10 (United Kingdom) *	Star Wars: The Last Jedi	106.5	2017
Films marked as (United Kingdom) * are classified as UK-qualifying productions by the British Film Institute. All figures and inflation adjustments as of 2024

Top ten UK-qualifying productions of the twenty-first century adjusted for inflation
Rank	Title	Adjusted gross (£ million)	Year
1	Star Wars: The Force Awakens	164.5	2015
2	Skyfall	143.4	2012
3	Spectre	127.0	2015
4	Harry Potter and the Philosopher’s Stone	116.2	2001
5	No Time to Die	115.0	2021
6	Avengers: Endgame	109.2	2019
7	Star Wars: The Last Jedi	106.5	2017
8	Harry Potter and the Deathly Hallows – Part 2	103.1	2011
9	Mamma Mia!	101.8	2008
10	Barbie	99.4	2023
All films are classified as UK-qualifying productions by the British Film Institute. All figures and inflation adjustments as of 2024

Highest-grossing films of the year in the twenty-first century
Year	Title	Gross (£ million)
2001 (United Kingdom) *	Harry Potter and the Philosopher’s Stone	66.1
2002	The Lord of the Rings: The Two Towers (Note: The British Film Institute have possibly made an error in listing Harry Potter and the Chamber of Secrets as the highest-grossing 2002 release. Its UK earnings of £54.8 million were second to those of Lord of the Rings: The Two Towers which was released in the same year and grossed £57.6 million.)	57.6
2003	The Lord of the Rings: The Return of the King	61.1
2004	Shrek 2	48.2
2005 (United Kingdom) *	Harry Potter and the Goblet of Fire	49.2
2006 (United Kingdom) *	Casino Royale	55.6
2007 (United Kingdom) *	Harry Potter and the Order of the Phoenix	49.9
2008 (United Kingdom) *	Mamma Mia!	68.6
2009	Avatar	94.0
2010	Toy Story 3	74.0
2011 (United Kingdom) *	Harry Potter and the Deathly Hallows – Part 2	73.1
2012 (United Kingdom) *	Skyfall	103.2
2013	Despicable Me 2	47.5
2014	The Hobbit: The Battle of the Five Armies	41.2
2015 (United Kingdom) *	Star Wars: The Force Awakens	123.2
2016 (United Kingdom) *	Rogue One: A Star Wars Story	66.0
2017 (United Kingdom) *	Star Wars: The Last Jedi	82.6
2018 (United Kingdom) *	Avengers: Infinity War	70.8
2019 (United Kingdom) *	Avengers: Endgame	88.7
2020 (United Kingdom) *	1917	44.1
2021 (United Kingdom) *	No Time to Die	98.0
2022	Top Gun: Maverick	83.8
2023 (United Kingdom) *	Barbie	95.7
2024 (United Kingdom) *	Wicked †	61.4
2025	A Minecraft Movie	56.9
Films marked as (United Kingdom) * are classified as UK-qualifying productions by the British Film Institute. † indicates the film's gross has increased since January 2026.
