= Edie Martin =

British actress (1880–1964)

- Born: Edith Emma Martin; 1 January 1880; London, England
- Died: 22 February 1964 (aged 84); London, England
- Occupation: Actress
- Years active: 1931–1963
- Spouse: Felix W. Pitt

Edith Emma "Edie" Martin (1 January 1880 – 22 February 1964) was a British actress. She was a ubiquitous performer, on stage from 1886, playing generally small parts but in high demand, appearing in scores of British films (although often uncredited). She frequently appeared in memorable Ealing comedies as their resident "little old lady".

== Selected filmography ==
- M'Blimey (1931)
- Late Extra (1935) - Apartment Resident (uncredited)
- Broken Blossoms (1936) - Woman in West End Party Visit (uncredited)
- Educated Evans (1936) - Bit Part (uncredited)
- The Big Noise (1936) - Old Lady
- Feather Your Nest (1937) - Blanche (uncredited)
- Return of a Stranger (1937) - Mrs. Stevens (uncredited)
- Farewell Again (1937) - Mrs. Bulger
- Under the Red Robe (1937) - Maria
- St. Martin's Lane (1938) - Libby's Dresser (uncredited)
- Bad Boy (1938) - Mrs. Bryan
- A Spot of Bother (1938) - An Occasional Bar-Lady (uncredited)
- Old Mother Riley in Business (1941)
- Unpublished Story (1942) - Mrs. Duncan (uncredited)
- The Demi-Paradise (1943) - Miss Winifred Tisdall
- It's in the Bag (1944) - Mrs. Hicks (uncredited)
- Don't Take It to Heart (1945) - Miss Bucket
- A Place of One's Own (1945) - Cook
- They Were Sisters (1945) - Cook
- Here Comes the Sun (1946) - Mrs. Galloway
- Carnival (1946) - Martha (uncredited)
- Great Expectations (1946) - Mrs. Whimple
- The Courtneys of Curzon Street (1947) - Waitress (uncredited)
- When the Bough Breaks (1947) - Customer
- It Always Rains on Sunday (1947) - Mrs. Watson
- Oliver Twist (1948) - Annie
- My Brother's Keeper (1948) - Churchgoer Shaking Hands (uncredited)
- Another Shore (1948) - Half Crown Lady in Park (uncredited)
- Elizabeth of Ladymead (1948) - (uncredited)
- The History of Mr. Polly (1949) - Lady on roof
- Cardboard Cavalier (1949) - Argumentative Old Woman (uncredited)
- Adam and Evelyne (1949) - Woman Scrubbing Floor (uncredited)
- Blackmailed (1951) - Mrs. Porritt - a Patient
- The Galloping Major (1951) - Evelyn - Lady at Meeting (uncredited)
- The Lavender Hill Mob (1951) - Miss Evesham
- The Man in the White Suit (1951) - Mrs. Watson
- The Lady with a Lamp (1951)
- Night Was Our Friend (1951) - Old Lady Jury Member
- Time Gentlemen, Please! (1952) - Mary Wade
- The Titfield Thunderbolt (1953) - Emily
- Genevieve (1953) - Guest (uncredited)
- Meet Mr. Lucifer (1953) - Deaf Lady (uncredited)
- The End of the Road (1954) - Gloomy Gertie
- Hobson's Choice (1954) - Old Lady Buying Shoelaces (uncredited)
- Scotland Yard (film series) (1954, July) - ('The Mysterious Bullet' episode) - (mother/grandmother) - (uncredited)
- Lease of Life (1954) - Miss Calthorp's Friend
- The Black Rider (1954) - Elderly Lady
- As Long as They're Happy (1955) - Elderly fan
- Room in the House (1955)
- The Ladykillers (1955) - Lettice (uncredited)
- An Alligator Named Daisy (1955) - Wheelchair Pusher (uncredited)
- Ramsbottom Rides Again (1956) - (uncredited)
- My Teenage Daughter (1956) - Miss Ellis
- Sailor Beware! (1956) - Little Woman in Church
- The Naked Truth (1957) - Lady in Autograph Crowd (uncredited)
- Too Many Crooks (1959) - Gordon's Mother
- Follow a Star (1959) - Old Lady (uncredited)
- Kidnapped (1960) - Woman on the bridge
- A Weekend with Lulu (1961) - Lodgekeeper's Wife (uncredited)
- Sparrows Can't Sing (1963) - Old Lady on Bench (uncredited) (final film role)
