= Anthony Collins (composer) =

British-American composer and conductor (1893–1963)

Anthony Vincent Benedictus Collins (3 September 1893 – 11 December 1963) was a British composer and conductor. He scored around 30 films in the US and the UK between 1937 and 1954, and composed the British light music classic Vanity Fair in 1952. His Decca recordings of the seven Sibelius symphonies was the second cycle by a single conductor and orchestra released.

== Biography ==
Collins was born in Hastings, East Sussex, in 1893. At the age of seventeen he began to perform as violinist in the Hastings Municipal Orchestra. He then served four years in the army. Beginning in 1920 he studied violin with Achille Rivarde and composition with Gustav Holst at the Royal College of Music.

In 1926, he began his musical career performing as principal viola in the London Symphony Orchestra. For ten years he performed in that orchestra and also in the Royal Opera House Covent Garden Orchestra. He resigned these positions in 1936. For the rest of his career he divided his time between conducting, beginning with opera and moving to orchestra; and composition. His conducting debut was on 20 January 1938, when he led his former colleagues in the London Symphony Orchestra in Elgar's First Symphony, and the following year he founded the London Mozart Orchestra.

He moved to the United States in 1939 to conduct orchestras in Los Angeles and New York City as well as composing film music for RKO Pictures. He was nominated for three Academy Awards for best music and original score in three consecutive years (1940, 1941 and 1942) for Nurse Edith Cavell, Irene and Sunny. He returned to England in 1945, continuing to conduct the major British orchestras and also compose for British film studios. He retired at the end of the 1950s, returning to Los Angeles, where he died at the age of 70 in 1963.

== Compositions ==
Collins arranged and composed works in many genres, but it is the lighter pieces that are still known today. Most notable of these is Vanity Fair (1952), composed in mock Regency style after the novel of the same name by William Thackeray. Various miniatures, suites and film music extracts by Collins have been recorded. Of the film music, there is a five movement suite taken from his first score, Victoria the Great (1937). Having established himself in Hollywood during the war, he returned to the UK and scored a series of high profile British films, many of them starring Anna Neagle, such as Piccadilly Incident (1946), The Courtneys of Curzon Street (1947) and Odette (1950).

Four one-act operas - Perseus and Andromeda, Catherine Parr, The Blue Harlequin and Kanawa - were composed in the early 1930s for the Royal College of Music. Eire (1938) is a suite of Irish folksong arrangements. Louis XV Silhouettes (1939) is a suite of pastiche 18th-century dance movements. His 1942 Elegy in Memory of Edward Elgar, is based on a theme from the slow movement of Elgar's third symphony. Collins also compiled the Threnody for a Soldier Killed in Action (1944) from sketches left by Michael Heming, a young composer killed in World War II. There are also chamber works and songs.

Many of his more ambitious works have been lost. These include the last two of the four string symphonies, two violin concertos (the first only surviving in the version published for violin and piano), Romney Marsh for viola and orchestra (1944) and the cantata The Lay of Rosabelle. Others, such as the tone poem Sir Toby and Sir Andrew, only exist as historical recordings.

== Recordings ==
Collins conducted a series of recordings, notably of music of Elgar and Sibelius, for Decca Records and EMI. His Decca Kingsway Hall recordings made between 1952 and 1955 of the seven Sibelius symphonies (the second complete cycle with a single orchestra and conductor) and some of the tone poems were very highly regarded. He recorded with Decca from May 1945 to December 1956.

== Selected works ==
- The Lay of Rosabelle, choral cantata (1932)
- Catherine Parr, opera after a play by Maurice Baring (1930s)
- Perseus and Andromeda, opera (1930s)
- The Blue Harlequin, opera (1930s)
- Kanawa, opera (1930s)
- Topley Pike, pastoral (1937)
- Eire, suite (1938)
- Louis XV Silhouettes, suite (1939)
- Symphony No. 1 for strings (1940)
- Elegy in Memory of Edward Elgar (1942)
- Sir Andrew and Sir Toby, overture (1942)
- Romney Marsh, viola and orchestra (1944)
- Threnody for a Soldier Killed in Action (1944), from sketches left by Michael Heming
- The Song of Erin: Lamentation, cor anglais and orchestra (1946)
- The Willow Pattern Plate, ballet (1946)
- Symphony No. 2 for strings (Hallé/Barbirolli Cheltenham Festival 7 July 1950)
- Valse Lente, orch. Harry Dexter, extracted from Odette (1950)
- Prelude and Valse Variations, extracted from The Lady with a Lamp (1951)
- Hogarth Suite, oboe and strings (1952)
- Vanity Fair (1952)
- Violin Concerto No. 1, op. 48 (1953)
- With Emma in Town (recorded 1957)
- Festival Royal overture (1958)
- Santa Cécilia, orchestral madrigal (1959)
- Violin Concerto No. 2
- String Quartet in B♭ major
- Quartet for flute, violin, viola and harp
- Trio for flute, viola and harp

== Film music ==
- Victoria the Great, 1937
- The Rat, 1937
- A Royal Divorce, 1938
- Sixty Glorious Years, 1938
- Marigold, 1938
- Nurse Edith Cavell, 1939
- Allegheny Uprising, 1939
- Swiss Family Robinson, 1940
- Tom Brown's School Days, 1940
- Irene, 1940
- Sunny, 1941
- Unexpected Uncle, 1941
- The Nazis Strike, 1943
- Appointment in Berlin, 1943
- Destroyer, 1943
- Forever and a Day
- I Live in Grosvenor Square, 1945
- Piccadilly Incident, 1946
- The Courtneys of Curzon Street, 1947
- The Fabulous Texan, 1947
- Odette, 1950
- Thunder in God's Country, 1951
- The Lady with a Lamp, 1951
- Macao, 1952
- Derby Day, 1952
- Trent's Last Case, 1952
- Laughing Anne, 1953
- Adventures of Robinson Crusoe, 1954

=== Awards and nominations ===
Year	Award	Category	Work	Result
1940	Academy Awards	Best Original Score	Nurse Edith Cavell	Nominated
1941	Academy Awards	Best Original Score	Irene	Nominated
1942	Academy Awards	Best Music, Scoring of a Musical Picture	Sunny	Nominated
