= The Lady Is a Square =

1958 British film by Herbert Wilcox

- Original British 1-sheet poster
- Directed by: Herbert Wilcox
- Written by: Pamela Bower; Nicholas Phipps; Harold Purcell; Joseph E. Levine
- Produced by: Herbert Wilcox
- Starring: Anna Neagle; Frankie Vaughan; Janette Scott
- Cinematography: Gordon Dines
- Edited by: Basil Warren
- Music by: Wally Stott
- Production companies: Herbert Wilcox Productions; Embassy Pictures; Metro-Goldwyn-Mayer
- Distributed by: Associated British-Pathé
- Release date: 1958
- Running time: 100 minutes
- Country: United Kingdom
- Language: English

The Lady Is a Square is a black and white 1958 British comedy musical film directed by Herbert Wilcox and featuring Anna Neagle, Frankie Vaughan and Janette Scott.

It was Neagle's final film appearance. It was also the last of three films Wilcox made with Vaughan at Associated British although they made The Heart of a Man at Rank.

== Plot ==
Mrs Baring, a businesswoman and patron of classical music, has arranged for celebrated Eastern Bloc musician Spolenski to play in a series of concerts in Britain. However, she is aware that she is on the brink of bankruptcy and the Spolenski tour offers a final chance to save her finances.

Johnny Burns, an aspiring singer is hanging around a music shop he frequents when he spots Mrs. Baring's daughter, Joanna. Enraptured he pretends to be a piano-tuner and goes round to her house to help prepare the piano for a party held in Spolenksi's honour. Later, when Mrs. Baring is short of a butler, he offers his services and is so successful at his duties that he is taken on in a more permanent basis. He slowly begins to bond and court Joanna while doing his best to conceal his love of popular, modern music from Mrs Baring who is resolutely opposed to it and has forbidden her daughter to listen to it. Her financial problems continue to mount up and her phone is cut owing to unpaid bills.

Burns' friend and agent, Freddy, meanwhile has secured him an audition with Greenslade, a major popular record label, who are impressed with his performance. Convinced he is going to be a major star, they make plans to sign him up on a long-term contract. Burns' first demand of Greenslade is for money to pay for Mrs. Baring's telephone to be restored. Mrs. Baring is relieved by this gesture, but believes the money came from one of her other friends rather than Burns.

Burn's career swiftly takes off, he is engaged to perform at The Talk of the Town, while still keeping his new success a secret from the Barings. Mrs Baring has further problems when tickets for her Spolenski concerts sell badly, and he threatens to leave for home unless she is able to put up £3,000. Once again Burns secretly steps in, securing the money as an advance from Greenslades. After learning of Burns' fame, Joanna goes to his concert. When her mother discovers this, she grows furious and confronts both of them firing Burns and forbidding her daughter from seeing him again. In his anger, he calls her a "square".

Their rift is not helped by his next song, "The Lady is a Square" which appears to be directly mocking her. However, she relents when she discovers that he has secretly been paying her bills and that he is trying to abandon a concert of his, which is scheduled at the same time as her Spolenski concert, in a bid to help her ticket sales. Spolenski then falls ill, which turns out to be a blessing as it will mean they will be able to re-launch the tour with financial assistance from Greenslade.

Baring and her daughter attend Burns' concert where to their surprise he performs Handel's Ombra mai fu with the National Youth Orchestra, to wild applause from his fans. Ultimately, they are able to agree on the co-existence of popular and classical music and Mrs. Baring ends the film dancing with Freddie as Johnny dances with Joanna to a swing instrumental.

As a joke, when Johnny is in the recording studio, one of the producers says "he is another Frankie Vaughan".

== Cast ==
- Anna Neagle as Frances Baring
- Frankie Vaughan as Johnny Burns
- Janette Scott as Joanna Baring
- Anthony Newley as Freddy
- Wilfrid Hyde-White as Charles
- Christopher Rhodes as Greenslade
- Kenneth Cope as Derek
- Josephine Fitzgerald as Mrs. Eady
- Harold Kasket as Spolenski
- John Le Mesurier as Fergusson
- Ted Lune as Harry Shuttleworth
- Mary Peach as Mrs. Freddy

== Production ==
The film features and names the then-new London nightclub The Talk of the Town and the Royal Festival Hall as venues. The plot is set in the then contemporary London theatre world and makes reference to impresarios such as Lord Delfont.

== Music ==
The film includes Vaughan singing "Love Is the Sweetest Thing" which was released as a single in 1959.

== Releases ==
The film was re-released theatrically in 2001 by Paramount Pictures in North America and Universal Pictures internationally.

== Critical reception ==
The Monthly Film Bulletin wrote: "Elegant décor, luxury foods, beautiful clothes and exotic nightlife are the main features in this British musical's attempt to reconcile "pop" addicts and serious music lovers. Unfortunately, this latest variation in the Wilcox-Neagle dream world lacks two essentials – glamour and excitement. Anna Neagle remains too determinedly graceful in the face of Frances's money difficulties, while Frankie Vaughan's acting has none of the zest that he puts into his singing. Even the excellent work of the National Youth Orchestra seems more of an intrusion than an advantage, and Wilcox's direction suffers through straining too hard to contain both the gloss of "high life" and the more suburban course dictated by the screenplay."

Variety wrote: "Herbert Wilcox hes whipped up a shrewd concoction of romance, comedy aid music, with the pic having afoot in both camps – the "pop" and classical music fields. ... It is an exuberant, funny piece of work."

In British Sound Films: The Studio Years 1928–1959 David Quinlan rated the film as "average", writing: "Just about bearable."

Leslie Halliwell wrote: "Strained attempt to carry on the Spring in Park Lane tradition, with a few inspirations from Joe Pasternak and One Hundred Men and a Girl. Earnest performances, obvious jokes."

== Home media ==
The Lady is a Square was released on Region 1 DVD in 2001 by Paramount Home Entertainment and Region 2 in 2002 by Universal Studios Home Entertainment (via StudioCanal). The film had DVD and Blu-ray releases in October 2006 by Paramount Home Entertainment in Region 1 (NTSC), and Universal Studios Home Entertainment on Region 2 (PAL) in April 2009, and in Spain by Filmax in October 2006.
