= Nicholas Phipps =

British actor (1913–1980)

- in The Iron Petticoat (1956)
- Born: William Nicholas Foskett Phipps; 23 June 1913; London, England
- Died: 11 April 1980 (aged 66); London, England
- Occupations: Actor, screenwriter
- Years active: 1938–1970

William Nicholas Foskett Phipps (23 June 1913 – 11 April 1980) was a British actor and writer who appeared in stage roles between 1932 and 1967 and more than thirty films between 1940 and 1970. He wrote West End plays, songs and sketches for revues, and film scripts.

== Life and career ==
=== Early years ===
Phipps was born in London on 23 June 1913, the son of the civil servant Sir Edmund Bampfylde Phipps and his wife Margaret, née Phipps (the granddaughter of Charles Paul Phipps). He was educated at Winchester College.

He made his first appearance on the stage at the Old Vic on 25 January 1932, walking-on Julius Caesar. In 1933, he played in Anew McMaster's Shakespearian season at the Chiswick Empire, and at Christmas, appeared at the Embassy in Aladdin . At the St Martin's in March 1934 he played Henry in Love in a Mist, subsequently joining the Northampton repertory company. During 1934–35, he was co-director of the Imperial Institute Theatre. He toured in 1934 in P. G. Wodehouse's Good Morning, Bill and was a member of the Oxford Playhouse in 1935–36.

In 1936, Phipps toured with Dame Sybil Thorndike's company in Noël Coward's Hands Across the Sea, D. H. Lawrence's My Son's My Son and Euripides' Hippolytus. He toured in South Africa in 1937, in The Frog and The Amazing Dr Clitterhouse, and on his return, played at the summer theatre at Perranporth. At the Gate Theatre in December 1937 he appeared in Members Only. His last three appearances before the Second World War were as Tony Fox-Collier in Spring Meeting (Ambassadors, May 1938), as Roland Capel in First Stop North (King's, Hammersmith, May 1939) and in The Gate Revue at the Ambassadors (June 1939).

=== War and post-war ===
During the war Phipps served in the Royal Artillery from 1940 to 1943. He then appeared for ENSA in a concert party at Gibraltar and North Africa, and then toured as Charles Condomine in Coward's Blithe Spirit. After playing Proust in Crisis in Heaven at the Lyric in May 1944, he succeeded Cecil Parker as Charles Condomine in the long London run of Blithe Spirit, at the Duchess Theatre, 1944–45.

At the Q Theatre in October 1947 Phipps played Clive Hamilton in his own play Bold Lover. His stage roles in the 1950s were Villardieu in Ardele (Vaudeville, August 1951), Alexander Marko in The Hungry God (Q Theatre, February 1952), Jaques Lambert in Figure of Fun (Aldwych, April 1952) and Charles Waterlow in Letter From Paris (Aldwych, October 1952).

His last two stage roles were in the 1960s. At the St Martin's in June 1964 he played Sir William Hood in Past Imperfect, and at the Vaudeville in April 1967 he played Frederick Sterroll in Coward's Fallen Angels.

Phipps was the author of the plays, "First Stop North", "Bold Lover", "The Burning Boat", and of numerous lyrics and sketches for revues, some written in collaboration with his cousin Joyce Grenfell.

=== Film work ===
In addition to his stage work, Phipps was connected with the cinema throughout much of his career. In 1932 and 1933 he was engaged by the Gaumont Picture Corporation in an unspecified capacity. As well as acting in numerous films from 1940 onwards he wrote screenplays for many. Those he mentioned in his Who's Who entry were Spring in Park Lane, Maytime in Mayfair, The Captain's Paradise, Doctor in the House and three sequels, and No Love For Johnnie. His script for Doctor in the House was nominated for a BAFTA.

As a screen actor Phipps appeared mainly in British comedy films, often specialising in playing military figures. He began his association with Herbert Wilcox working on I Live in Grosvenor Square (1945). He wrote This Man Is Mine (1946) then had a big hit with Piccadilly Incident (1946) which he wrote for Wilcox and Anna Neagle, Wilcox's wife. They reunited on The Courtneys of Curzon Street (1947) and Spring in Park Lane (1948), also successfully. Phipps also worked on The First Gentleman (1948) then was back with Wilcox and Neagle for Maytime in Mayfair (1948) and Elizabeth of Ladymead (1949).

Phipps wrote two films for Stewart Granger: Woman Hater (1948) and Adam and Evelyne (1949). He then did a Wilcox movie without Neagle, Into the Blue (1950). He wrote a script for David Lean, Madeleine (1950) and did one for Ralph Thomas, Appointment with Venus (1951)

He was one of several writers on I Believe in You (1952), and did a thriller for George Raft Escape Route (1952). After an Alec Guinness comedy, The Captain's Paradise (1953), Phipps had one of the biggest hits of his career with Doctor in the House (1954) for Thomas. He did the sequels Doctor at Sea (1955) and Doctor at Large (1957), plus a similar comedy, True as a Turtle (1957). Others wereThe Captain's Table (1959); The Lady Is a Square (1959), for Wilcox, and Doctor in Love (1960).

For Thomas, Phipps wrote No Love for Johnnie (1961). More typical were A Pair of Briefs (1962), The Amorous Prawn (US: The Playgirl and the War Minister, 1963) and Doctor in Distress (1963).

=== Last years ===
Phipps retired from acting in 1970. He died in Acton, London on 11 April 1980, aged 66, leaving a widow, Joyce (née Robinson).

== Partial filmography ==
=== Actor ===
- Pride o' the Green (1937) (TV) – Macleeves
- Two Gentlemen of Soho (1938) (TV )
- Hands Across the Sea (1938) (TV)
- Spring Meeting (1938) (TV)
- First Stop North (1939) (TV) – Roland Capel
- The Gate Revue (1939) (TV)
- Blackout (1940) – Man in Car (uncredited)
- You Will Remember (1941) – Earl of Potter
- Old Bill and Son (1941) – BBC Reporter
- The Courtneys of Curzon Street (1947) – Phipps
- Spring in Park Lane (1948) – Marquis of Borechester
- Elizabeth of Ladymead (1948) – John Beresford in 1854
- Maytime in Mayfair (1949) – Sir Henry Hazelrigg
- Madeleine (1950) – Reporter (uncredited)
- Appointment with Venus (1951) – Minister
- The Captain's Paradise (1953) – The Major
- The Intruder (1953) – Regular Officer
- Doctor in the House (1954) – Magistrate
- Forbidden Cargo (1954) – Royal Navy Information Officer (uncredited)
- Mad About Men (1955) – Col. Barclay Sutton
- Out of the Clouds (1955) – Hilton-Davidson
- All for Mary (1955) – General McLintock-White
- Who Done It? (1956) – Scientist
- The Iron Petticoat (1956) – Tony Mallard
- Doctor at Large (1957) – Mr. Wayland – Solicitor
- Orders to Kill (1958) – Lecturer Lieutenant
- Rockets Galore! (1958) – Andrew Wishart
- The Navy Lark (1959) – Capt. Povey
- The Captain's Table (1959) – Reddish
- Don't Panic Chaps! (1959) – Mortimer
- Upstairs and Downstairs (1959) – Harry
- Doctor in Love (1960) – Dr. Clive Cardew
- The Pure Hell of St Trinian's (1960) – Major
- A Pair of Briefs (1962) – Sutcliffe
- Summer Holiday (1963) – Wrightmore
- Heavens Above! (1963) – Director-General
- Foreign Affairs (1964) (TV series) – Ambassador
- Charlie Bubbles (1967) – Agent
- Some Girls Do (1969) – Lord Dunnberry
- Monte Carlo or Bust! (1969) – Golfer
- The Rise and Rise of Michael Rimmer (1970) – Snaggot

=== Screenwriter ===
- More Fun and Games! (1939) (TV movie)
- First Stop North (1939) (TV movie)
- Look Here! (1939) (short)
- A Yank in London (1945)
- This Man Is Mine (1946)
- Piccadilly Incident (1946)
- A Word in Your Eye (1947) (TV movie)
- Kathy's Love Affair (1947)
- The Courtneys of Curzon Street (1947)
- Affairs of a Rogue (1948)
- Spring in Park Lane (1948)
- Elizabeth of Ladymead (1948)
- Woman Hater (1948)
- Adam and Evelyne (1949)
- Maytime in Mayfair (1949)
- Into the Blue (1950)
- Madeleine (1950)
- Man in the Display (1950)
- Appointment with Venus (1952) aka Island Rescue
- I Believe in You (1952)
- Penny Plain (1952) (TV movie)
- Escape Route (1952) aka I'll Get You
- The Captain's Paradise (1953)
- Doctor in the House (1954)
- Doctor at Sea (1955)
- True as a Turtle (1957)
- Doctor at Large (1957)
- The Captain's Table
- Tommy the Toreador (1959)
- The Lady Is a Square (1959)
- Doctor in Love (1960)
- No Love for Johnnie (1962) (with Mordecai Richler)
- A Pair of Briefs (1962)
- Young and Willing (1962)
- The Amorous Mr. Prawn (1962)
- Doctor in Distress (1963)

== Sources ==
- Herbert, Ian, ed. (1972). Who's Who in the Theatre (fifteenth ed.). London: Sir Isaac Pitman and Sons. ISBN 978-0-273-31528-5.
- Mander, Raymond; Joe Mitchenson (2000) [1957]. Barry Day; Sheridan Morley (eds.). Theatrical Companion to Coward (second ed.). London: Oberon. ISBN 978-1-84002-054-0.
