= Gladys Young =

English actress (1887–1975)

Gladys Young OBE
- Born: 29 April 1887; Newcastle upon Tyne, England
- Died: 18 August 1975 (aged 88); Eastbourne district, Sussex
- Occupation: Actress
- Years active: ~1926–1975

Gladys Young (29 April 1887 – 18 August 1975) was an English actress and prominent member of BBC Radio Drama Company. Peggy Chambers' 1954 book, Women And The World Today, has a chapter on Gladys Young's life and achievements up to the 1950s.

== Early life ==
Gladys Young was born in Newcastle, to William Michael Young and Frances Jane Hocken. She was educated at Sutton High School, and later at Bonn, in Germany. Her sister was the novelist E. H. Young.

She joined an amateur dramatic club along with Mabel Constanduros and Leslie Howard. At the start of the First World War, she was in J.E. Harold Terry and Lechmere Worrall's The Man Who Stayed at Home but, in 1916, left to marry Major Algernon Henry Pascoe West. In 1926, Mabel Constanduros suggested she take an audition for radio broadcasting at Savoy Hill.

== Career ==
In July 1930, Gladys Young appeared, along with Earle Grey, in the first play on a television screen, Luigi Pirandello's The Man with the Flower in his Mouth, directed by Lance Sieveking. According to Val Gielgud, The TV system employed was Baird's in his Long Acre studio.

In 1939, Gladys Young joined the newly-formed B.B.C. Repertory Company which subsequently moved from Evesham to Manchester. In 1940, she went to Bristol and became involved in Children's Hour and Schools programmes.

In 1946, she appeared in film The Courtneys of Curzon Street as Lady Courtney, along with Anna Neagle and Michael Wilding.

== Awards ==
Gladys Young was awarded the Silver Microphone for the best actress of the radio year for 1949 and 1950. In 1951, she received the O.B.E. in the New Year's Honours List.

== Death ==
Gladys Young died on 18 August 1975 in Eastbourne district, Sussex. The BBC broadcast a tribute programme, Gladys Young - First Lady of the Air in 1975, soon after her death.

== Radio appearances ==
Gladys Young appeared in hundreds of BBC radio programmes, including:

- Gerald Grace's The House Agent 2LO 19/11/1926
- Luigi Pirandello's The Man with the Flower in his Mouth 2LO 29/8/1929
- A.J. Alan's Fire! 2LO 8/12/1926
- Oscar Wilde's The Importance of Being Earnest as Miss Prism 2LO 3/5/1927
- The Children's Hour 'The Minotaur' 2LO 28/2/1935

== Earliest surviving recording ==
The earliest recording of Gladys Young surviving in the BBC Archives is a 4-minute trailer for P.H. Lennox's Matinee, originally broadcast on the National Programme 22/9/1933. It was used in a 1950 talk by Val Gielgud, as part of a series demonstrating the development of broadcast drama between 1924 and 1933.

The 1970 BBC Sound Archives - Catalogue of Drama Recordings has this entry:

"MATINEE"" by P.H. Lennox. Trailer for farcical fantasy specially written for broadcasting. With Ray Wallace, Hermione Gingold, Gladys Young and Charles H. Mason. Produced by Lance Sieveking. No.7 in series Twelve Plays for Broadcasting. National 22.9.33 (Trailer); National 17.11.33 (Complete play). 4.20 282
