= The Lady with a Lamp =

1951 film by Herbert Wilcox

- Australian daybill poster
- Directed by: Herbert Wilcox
- Written by: Warren Chetham Strode
- Based on: The Lady with a Lamp by Reginald Berkeley
- Produced by: Herbert Wilcox
- Starring: Anna Neagle; Michael Wilding; Felix Aylmer
- Cinematography: Max Greene
- Edited by: Bill Lewthwaite
- Music by: Anthony Collins
- Color process: Black and white
- Production company: Imperadio Pictures
- Distributed by: British Lion Films
- Release date: 22 October 1951 (London)
- Running time: 110 minutes
- Country: United Kingdom
- Language: English
- Box office: £151,091 (UK)

The Lady with a Lamp is a 1951 British historical drama film directed by Herbert Wilcox and starring Anna Neagle, Michael Wilding and Felix Aylmer. It was written by Warren Chetham Strode based on the 1929 play The Lady with a Lamp by Reginald Berkeley. The film depicts the life of Florence Nightingale and her work with wounded British soldiers during the Crimean War.

== Plot ==
Illustrating the political complexities the hard-headed nurse had to battle in order to achieve sanitary medical conditions during the Crimean War. Opposed in the uppermost circles of British government because she is "merely" a woman, Florence Nightingale is championed by the Hon. Sidney Herbert, minister of war. Herbert pulls strings to allow Nightingale and her nursing staff access to battlefield hospitals, and in so doing changes the course of medical history.

== Main cast ==
- Anna Neagle as Florence Nightingale
- Michael Wilding as Lord Herbert
- Felix Aylmer as Lord Palmerston
- Gladys Young as Mrs Bracebridge
- Julian D'Albie as Mr Bracebridge
- Arthur Young as William Gladstone
- Edwin Styles as Mr Nightingale
- Helen Shingler as Parthenope Nightingale
- Rosalie Crutchley as Mrs Sidney Herbert
- Clement McCallin as Richard M. Milnes
- Helena Pickard as Queen Victoria
- Peter Graves as Prince Albert
- Sybil Thorndike as Miss Bosanquet
- Monckton Hoffe as Lord Stratford
- Cecil Trouncer as Sir Douglass Dawson
- Michael Craig as wounded soldier

== Production ==
It was shot at Shepperton Studios outside London. Location shooting took place at Cole Green railway station in Hertfordshire and at Lea Hurst, the Nightingale family home, near Matlock in Derbyshire. The film's sets were designed by the art director William C. Andrews. The film includes Queen Victoria as a character; Neagle had previously played the monarch in two 1930s films.

== Premiere ==
On 22 September 1951, Princess Elizabeth accompanied by the Prince Philip attended the Commonwealth film premiere at the Warner Theatre, Leicester Square in London at 8:00pm. A reception was held beforehand at Claridge's Hotel.

The film was preceded by an introductory film taken in a replica of Nightingale's room in South Street, where the Countess Mountbatten of Burma President of the Royal College of Nursing (RCN) Education Fund Appeal, explained the purpose of the Fund. The fund focused on supporting post-certificate nurses, either in developing specialist skills or in nursing posts of responsibility (such as Sister Tutor roles). She was accompanied by international nurses taking courses at the RCN or continuing their nursing studies in London. Simultaneous premieres were arranged in Scotland Wales, Northern Ireland, the Channel Islands, the Isle of Man and at centres throughout the Commonwealth. The short fundraising film was subsequently shown at some 400 ABC Cinemas over a six week period. The proceeds of these viewings were donated to the Fund through the generosity of Herbert Wilcox and Anna Neagle, to a total of over £24,000.

== Reception ==
=== Box office ===
The film was popular at the British box office. It was judged by Kinematograph Weekly as a "notable performer" at British cinemas in 1951.

=== Critical reception ===
The Monthly Film Bulletin wrote: "What the handling and the performance conspicuously and disastrously lack is the quality of toughness – physical, mental and moral – which was the basis of Florence Nightingale's character. ... Anna Neagle's performance, although marked by obvious sincerity of intention, has softened the redoubtable Florence Nightingale into a figure of dull and conventional nobility. These defects in conception apart, the film is a slow, sedate, refined chronicle which rises to drama only on the very rare occasions when the material itself takes command."

TV Guide gave the film three out of four stars, and noted, "the contrast in settings--between stately British homes and the squalor of the hospital--focuses the viewer's attentions on what the real battles were. Honorable mention should be given to Lewthwaite's editing of the war sequences."

Leonard Maltin also gave the film three out of four stars, noting a "Methodical recreation of 19th- century nurse-crusader Florence Nightingale, tastefully enacted by Neagle."

Variety observed, "Anna Neagle adds another portrait to her screen gallery of famous women. Her characterization of Florence Nightingale is a sincerely moving study...Michael Wilding is not too happily cast as Sidney Herbert, War Minister. Within limitations, he makes the best of this part. The strong feature cast includes Felix Aylmer, with an exceptionally good study of Lord Palmerston. Herbert Wilcox, as always, directs in a plain, straightforward manner."

According to academics Sue Harper and Vince Porter, "The film is poor on characterization and concentrates on Nightingale’s powers of social consolidation by combining female energy with an insistence on ‘duty’. This was Wilcox’s last attempt to play innovation against tradition. After this, his films always embraced traditional structures of feeling with disastrous box office results."
