= Helen Cherry =

English actress (1915–2001)

- Born: Helen Mary Cherry; 24 November 1915; Worsley, Lancashire, England
- Died: 27 September 2001 (aged 85); Bushey, Hertfordshire, England
- Occupation: Actress
- Years active: 1938–1992
- Spouse: Trevor Howard (m. 1944; died 1988)

Helen Mary Cherry (24 November 1915 – 27 September 2001) was an English stage, film and television actress. She was born in Worsley, Lancashire, and brought up in Harrogate, West Riding of Yorkshire.

== Marriage ==
Whilst working at the Arts Theatre, Cherry met fellow actor Trevor Howard, whom she married on 8 September 1944; they remained married until his death in 1988. They had no children.

== Selected filmography ==
- The Courtneys of Curzon Street (1947) – Mary Courtney
- The Mark of Cain (1947) – Mary
- For Them That Trespass (1949) – Mary Drew
- Adam and Evelyne (1949) – Moira Hannon
- Morning Departure (1950) – Helen Armstong
- They Were Not Divided (1950) – Wilhelmina
- Last Holiday (1950) – Miss Mellows
- The Woman with No Name (1950) – Sybil
- Young Wives' Tale (1951) – Mary Banning
- His Excellency (1952) – Lady Kirkman
- Castle in the Air (1952) – Boss Trent
- Three Cases of Murder (1955) – Lady Mountdrago ("Lord Mountdrago" segment)
- High Flight (1957) – Louise Dawson
- The Naked Edge (1961) – Miss Osborne
- The Devil's Agent (1962) – Countess Carla Cosimano
- Tomorrow at Ten (1963) – Robbie
- Delayed Flight (1964) – Helen Strickland
- Flipper's New Adventure (1964) – Julia
- The Charge of the Light Brigade (1968) – Lady Scarlett
- Hard Contract (1969) – Evelyn Carlson
- 11 Harrowhouse (1974) – Lady Anne Bolding
- Conduct Unbecoming (1975) – Mrs. Strang
- No Longer Alone (1976) – Miss Godfrey
- Flashpoint Africa (1980) – Mrs. Barraclough
- Lady Killers (1981) – Mrs. Grace Angus
- Clash of Loyalties (1983) – Lady Cox
- Nemesis (1987) – Miss Elizabeth Temple
- The Girl in a Swing (1988) – Lady Alice
- A Ghost in Monte Carlo (1990) – Mother Superior
