= Frank Clarke (editor) =

British film editor

- Born: 31 December 1915; London, United Kingdom
- Died: September 2002 (aged 86); Devon, United Kingdom
- Occupation: Editor
- Years active: 1934–1971 (film)

Frank Clarke (31 December 1915 – September 2002) was a British film editor. He worked for many years for the British branch of MGM at Elstree Studios.

== Selected filmography ==
- Clothes and the Woman (1937)
- Tunisian Victory (1944)
- Spring in Park Lane (1948)
- Elizabeth of Ladymead (1949)
- Conspirator (1949)
- The Miniver Story (1950)
- Calling Bulldog Drummond (1951)
- Ivanhoe (1952)
- Never Let Me Go (1953)
- Time Bomb (1953)
- Mogambo (1953)
- Knights of the Round Table (1953)
- Beau Brummell (1954)
- Bedevilled (1955)
- Bhowani Junction (1956)
- The Barretts of Wimpole Street (1957)
- Action of the Tiger (1957)
- I Accuse! (1958)
- Tom Thumb (1958)
- Libel (1959)
- The Day They Robbed the Bank of England (1960)
- The Green Helmet (1961)
- A Matter of WHO (1961)
- Light in the Piazza (1962)
- I Thank a Fool (1962)
- Come Fly with Me (1963)
- The V.I.P.s (1963)
- The Golden Head (1964)
- The Yellow Rolls-Royce (1965)
- Blow-Up (1966)
- Pretty Polly (1967)
- Lock Up Your Daughters (1969)
- No Blade of Grass (1970)

== Bibliography ==
- Perkins, Roy & Stollery, Martin. British Film Editors: The Heart of the Movie. Bloomsbury Publishing, 2019.
