= Irene (1940 film) =

- Original poster
- Directed by: Herbert Wilcox
- Screenplay by: Alice Duer Miller
- Based on: Irene by Harry Tierney; James H. Montgomery; Joseph McCarthy
- Produced by: Herbert Wilcox
- Starring: Anna Neagle; Ray Milland; Roland Young; Alan Marshal
- Cinematography: Russell Metty
- Edited by: Elmo Williams
- Music by: Anthony Collins (underscore); Harry Tierney (song score)
- Distributed by: RKO Radio Pictures
- Release date: May 3, 1940
- Running time: 101 minutes
- Country: United States
- Language: English
- Budget: $578,000
- Box office: $1,620,000

Irene is a 1940 American musical film produced and directed by Herbert Wilcox. The screenplay by Alice Duer Miller is based on the libretto of the 1919 stage musical Irene by James Montgomery, who had adapted it from his play Irene O'Dare. The score features songs with music by Harry Tierney and lyrics by Joseph McCarthy.

== Plot ==
Upholsterer's assistant Irene O'Dare meets wealthy Don Marshall while she is measuring chairs for Mrs. Herman Vincent at her Long Island estate. Charmed by the young girl, Don anonymously purchases Madame Lucy's, an exclusive Manhattan boutique, and instructs newly hired manager Mr. Smith to offer Irene a job as a model. She soon catches the eye of socialite Bob Vincent, whose mother is hosting a ball at the family mansion. In order to promote Madame Lucy's dress line, Mr. Smith arranges for his models to be invited to the soiree.

Irene lets her friend Jane dance around holding up the gown she was given to wear, the “Flaming Rosebud”. Jane collides with Granny and a potful of Irish stew, ruining the dress. She substitutes a blue satin costume that belonged to her mother, and it creates a sensation. Irene is mistaken for the niece of Ireland's Lady O'Dare and, in order to publicize his collection, Mr. Smith decides to exploit the error. He moves Irene into a Park Avenue apartment. Dressed in furs and draped with diamonds while escorted around town by Bob, Irene's appearance prompts gossip columnist Biffy Webster to suggest she is a kept woman. Outraged, Irene demands Madame Lucy protect her reputation by revealing the truth, only to discover Don is the owner of the shop.

Irene agrees to marry Bob, but on the night before the wedding, Bob confesses he still loves former fiancée Eleanor Worth, and Irene realizes she loves Don. The couple decides to make things right by reuniting with their rightful partners.

== Cast ==
- Anna Neagle as Irene O'Dare
- Ray Milland as Don Marshall
- Roland Young as Mr. Smith
- Alan Marshal as Bob Vincent
- May Robson as Granny O'Dare
- Billie Burke as Mrs. Herman Vincent
- Arthur Treacher as Betherton
- Marsha Hunt as Eleanor Worth
- Isabel Jewell as Jane
- Doris Nolan as Lillian
- Juliette Compton as Mrs. Newlands Grey
- Nella Walker as Mrs. Marshall, Don’s mother
- Louis Jean Heydt as 'Biffy' Webster

== Production ==
For nearly two decades following its original 1919 production at the Vanderbilt Theatre, Irene — with a total run of 675 performances — held the record for the longest-running show in Broadway theatre history. In addition to the 1926 silent film Irene, the musical also was adapted for a June 1936 Lux Radio Theatre production starring Jeanette MacDonald and Regis Toomey.

The film was shot in black and white with the exception of a Technicolor sequence that begins at Mrs. Vincent's society ball when Bretherton's jaw drops as he looks up to see Irene coming downstairs. Don and Irene dance to an instrumental version of "Alice Blue Gown," and the sequence ends at the O'Dare's apartment, where Irene sings the song to her grandmother and friend. The return to black and white shows the Vincent mansion and the text: “Came the cold grey dawn.”

The song is replayed as an installment of Rex Gordon's Moviebone News, a spoof of the Movietone News shorts that were popular at the time. Irene's dress—and the song—have become world-famous, and performers from Peoria to Paris, from Hawaii to Harlem give their versions of the song. According to the theater program displayed on screen, the Moviebone News features “Martha Tilton, Hattie Noel, The Rocketts, the Dandridge Sisters and Chorus of Fifty.”

Johnny Long and His Orchestra make cameo appearances in the film.

This version downplays the "Madame Lucy" character. Other versions of Irene present "Lucy" as a very campy gay man.

== Song list ==
1. "Castle of Dreams"
2. "You've Got Me Out on a Limb"
3. "Alice Blue Gown"
4. "Irene"
5. "Worthy of You"
6. "Something in the Air"
7. "Sweet Vermosa Brown"

== Reception ==
The film made a profit of $367,000.

== Awards and nominations ==
Year	Award	Category	Recipient(s) and nominee(s)	Result
1941	Academy Awards	Best Music, Score	Anthony Collins	Nominated
