= Elizabeth of Ladymead =

- Hugh Williams and Anna Neagle
- Directed by: Herbert Wilcox
- Written by: Frank Harvey; Nicholas Phipps
- Produced by: Herbert Wilcox; J.D. Wilcox
- Starring: Anna Neagle; Hugh Williams; Bernard Lee
- Cinematography: Mutz Greenbaum
- Edited by: Frank Clarke
- Music by: Robert Farnon
- Production company: Herbert Wilcox Productions
- Distributed by: British Lion Film Corporation
- Release date: 22 December 1948
- Running time: 97 minutes
- Country: United Kingdom
- Language: English
- Budget: £298,654
- Box office: £154,864 (UK)

Elizabeth of Ladymead is a 1948 British Technicolor drama film directed by Herbert Wilcox and starring Anna Neagle, Hugh Williams, Isabel Jeans and Bernard Lee. It charts the life of a British family between 1854 and 1945 and their involvement in four wars - the Crimean War, Boer War, First World War and Second World War. In each era a Beresford is in the army and dresses in the uniform of the age in most scenes, even at home.

It was shot at Shepperton Studios near London. The film's sets were designed by the art director William C. Andrews. The drama was remade by the BBC as a TV production in 1949, with Patricia Burke as Elizabeth, John Robinson as John Beresford, and Cathleen Nesbitt as Mother.

== Plot ==
Four generations of women (all played by Anna Neagle in the film) have lived in Ladymead, a Georgian mansion, while their husbands are away at war. From the Crimean War to the Second World War, in each case the husband returns home to find his wife more independently minded: the Crimean War wife inspired by the work of Florence Nightingale, the Boer War wife a suffragette and peace activist, and the Great War wife a Jazz Age flapper.

The film begins in the Second World War with her officer's husband, John Beresford, returning in a Short Sunderland. One evening at Ladymead House she faints, suffering concussion after imagining that she is trying to go through a door which is not there.

The story jumps to 1854 and is a celebration following the Battle of Balaclava during the Crimean War. John Beresford gives a speech. Elizabeth expresses a notion to help as a nurse with Florence Nightingale. They dance to the Blue Danube Waltz by Johann Strauss II (not actually written until 1866). Once alone Elizabeth plays Greensleeves on the piano for John. He explains the Charge of the Light Brigade to a friend. In the bedroom Elizabeth asks John to leave the army. He says the war is over (?) so there is now no risk. She presses him to run the estate instead. He refuses to change and says he will sleep in the dressing room. Elizabeth weeps next to the four-poster bed.

The story moves forward to 1903 as Elizabeth awaits the return of her husband from the Second Boer War. This time John is upset that Elizabeth has been managing the estate better than he did. Elizabeth sings Love's Old Sweet Song ("Just a Song at Twilight") as she plays the piano. Elizabeth shows an interest in politics and suffrage.

The story then switches to 1919, after the end of the First World War. John attends major celebrations in the city with crowds singing Auld Lang Syne before going back to Ladymead, which on arrival he finds unoccupied. His wife, who arrives shortly afterwards with a friend, Wrigley, does as she wishes, smoking cigarettes and dressing as a flapper. Wrigley explains how he avoided enlistment. Beresford, infuriated, throws him out. He and Elizabeth argue. John leaves the room and, in despair at his wife’s attitude, shoots himself.

The story reverts to 1945 and Elizabeth wakes from her faint. They go out dancing and she remembers the women in her dream.

== Cast ==
- Anna Neagle as Beth (1854), Elizabeth (1903), Betty (1919), Liz (1946)
- Hugh Williams as John Beresford (1946)
- Isabel Jeans as Mother (1903)
- Michael Laurence as John Beresford (1919)
- Bernard Lee as John Beresford (1903)
- Nicholas Phipps as John Beresford (1854)
- Michael Shepley as Major Wrigley (1903)
- Henry Edwards as Frank
- Hilda Bayley as Mother (1946)
- Jack Allen as Major Wrigley (1946)
- Kenneth Warrington as Tommy Wrigley (1919)
- Claude Bailey as Major Wrigley (1854)
- Catherine Paul as Mother (1854)
- Edie Martin as Annie
- Norman Pierce as Franklin

== Box Office ==
As of 30 June 1949, the film earned £129,700 in the UK of which £84,073 went to the producer.

== Critical reception ==
TV Guide wrote, "the stories are interesting at first, but by war No. 4 the film becomes pretty dull. Nice to look at, with lavish settings"; while Leonard Maltin found Anna Neagle "charming as English lady-of-the-manor with mind of her own," and described the film as a "star vehicle, unsuccessful when released, quite intriguing today for its depiction of woman's role in English society"; and Allmovie wrote, "Whenever the film becomes too repetitious, Elizabeth of Ladymead scores on the charm of Anna Neagle and her attractive deportment while wearing period costumes."

== US Release ==
The film received a limited release in the United States, where it was notable for doing exceptionally well in certain small media markets. In particular the film was the sixth most watched movie in every media market in the American state of Wyoming in 1948. Similarly, it was the tenth highest grossing movie in the state of Tennessee that year, if all media markets in Tennessee were combined. Henry Wriston commented on the film's success in the south saying "Usually, when it comes to who is watching what, the state of Georgia is divided into three separate markets, those being: Atlanta, Savannah and the rest of it. That picture, Elizabeth of Ladymead, was one of the most watched pictures in the rest of it. If you didn't count the markets in Atlanta and Savannah it was in the top five highest grossing pictures in Georgia...it performed very well there." Film critic Parker Tyler wrote in reference to the work of Ernest Dichter that "In New York and New Jersey nobody even heard of it, but, as we learned from Dichter's people, in Virginia people couldn't get enough of it. People in Virginia went back to see it again and again. It was in the top ten down there." The quoted work in question showed that in western Pennsylvania the film was as widely watched as Easter Parade, which was one of the highest grossing films in the United States that year.
