= Piccadilly Incident =

- Directed by: Herbert Wilcox
- Written by: Nicholas Phipps
- Based on: an original story by Florence Tranter
- Produced by: Herbert Wilcox
- Starring: Anna Neagle; Michael Wilding
- Cinematography: Max Greene
- Edited by: Flora Newton
- Music by: Anthony Collins
- Production company: Associated British Picture Corporation (ABPC)
- Distributed by: Pathé Pictures Ltd (UK)
- Release date: 30 September 1946 (UK)
- Running time: 103 minutes
- Country: United Kingdom
- Language: English
- Box office: £258,057 (UK)

Piccadilly Incident is a 1946 British drama film directed by Herbert Wilcox and starring Anna Neagle, Michael Wilding, Coral Browne, Edward Rigby and Leslie Dwyer. It was written by Nicholas Phipps based on a story by Florence Tranter.

== Plot ==
During an air-raid on Piccadilly in World War II, Chief Wren Diana Fraser, who is on active duty with the Women's Royal Naval Service, meets Captain Alan Pearson, a Royal Marines officer on sick leave after the evacuation from Dunkirk. He invites her for a drink at his house. They dance and fall in love. Impulsively, he proposes to her and they marry.

Alan is posted to North Africa and Diana to Singapore. As Singapore falls to the Japanese, she is evacuated, but the ship in which she is travelling is attacked and sunk, and all aboard are presumed drowned. However, she and four other passengers survive, including Bill Weston, a Canadian sailor who loves her.

Two years later, they are rescued after their boat is spotted by an American aeroplane. Diana returns home to find that her husband has remarried to an American Red Cross nurse, Joan, and they have a son. She is devastated and flees the house after meeting the wife.

Later, Diana approaches Alan backstage at a Navy show. She tells him that their marriage meant little to her and that she has another man with whom she became involved when stranded on the island. Then, the theatre is bombed and both of them are wounded. Diana dies in hospital, just after Alan visits her and she confesses her lies and they again declare their love for each other.

Later, a judge rules that Alan and Joan can remarry, but because they were not legally married at the time of the birth of their son, he will still legally be regarded as illegitimate.

== Cast ==
- Anna Neagle as Diana Fraser
- Michael Wilding as Captain Alan Pearson
- Frances Mercer as Joan Draper
- Michael Laurence as Bill Weston
- Coral Browne as Virginia Pearson
- A. E. Matthews as Sir Charles Pearson
- Edward Rigby as Judd
- Brenda Bruce as Sally Benton
- Leslie Dwyer as Sam
- Maire O'Neill as Mrs. Millgan
- Reginald Owen as judge
- Michael Medwin as radio operator
- Roger Moore as guest sitting at Pearson's table (uncredited)

== Production ==
Herbert Wilcox made the film as a follow-up to I Live in Grosvenor Square (1945). He hoped to use the same leads, Anna Neagle and Rex Harrison, but the success of Grosvenor Square saw Harrison offered a contract with 20th Century Fox. Wilcox offered the role to John Mills, who turned it down. He accepted Michael Wilding reluctantly at the suggestion of Wilding's agent, but once he saw Wilding and Neagle play their first scene together, he put Wilding under a personal long-term contract.

Wilcox teamed his wife Anna Neagle with Michael Wilding for the first time, establishing them as top box-office stars in five more films, ending with Derby Day (1952). Wilding was third choice for leading man after Rex Harrison and John Mills.

== Reception ==
=== Box office ===
It was the second most popular film at the British box office in 1946, after The Wicked Lady.

The film was successfully reissued in 1947.

=== Critical reception ===
Though The New York Times thought the film demonstrated "the British are quite as capable as the Americans of unconvincing direction, ill-considered writing and tedious acting" while English critic Godfrey Winn wrote "In Piccadilly Incident is born the greatest team in British Films".

Leonard Maltin wrote "good British cast gives life to oft-filmed plot".

Allmovie called the film "a weeper deluxe".

The Radio Times concluded that the film "effectively opens the tear ducts".

Leslie Halliwell said: "The Enoch Arden theme again, and the first of the Wilcox-Neagle 'London' films, though untypically a melodrama with a sad ending."

In British Sound Films: The Studio Years 1928–1959 David Quinlan rated the film as "average", writing: "A big box-office hit, it established the stars as one of Britain's most potent post-war teams."

== Accolades ==
It was voted the best British film of 1946 at Britain's National Film Awards. Neagle's was voted Best Actress of the year by the readers of Picturegoer magazine.
