= My Teenage Daughter =

1956 British film by Herbert Wilcox

- British quad poster by Brian Robb
- Directed by: Herbert Wilcox
- Written by: Felicity Douglas
- Produced by: Herbert Wilcox
- Starring: Anna Neagle; Sylvia Syms; Norman Wooland
- Cinematography: Mutz Greenbaum
- Edited by: Basil Warren
- Music by: Stanley Black
- Production company: Herbert Wilcox Productions
- Distributed by: British Lion Films
- Release date: 20 June 1956
- Running time: 100 minutes
- Country: United Kingdom
- Language: English
- Box office: £181,467 (UK)

My Teenage Daughter (also known as Teenage Bad Girl) is a 1956 British drama film directed by Herbert Wilcox and starring Anna Neagle, Sylvia Syms and Norman Wooland. It was written by Felicity Douglas and concerns a mother who tries to deal with her teenage daughter's descent into delinquency. It was intended as a British response to Rebel Without a Cause (1955). It was the last commercially successful film made by Wilcox.

== Synopsis ==
Valerie Carr is a widowed magazine editor who lives in London and has two teenage daughters, Jan and Poppet. Jan falls for the wealthy Tony Ward Black, who takes her dancing and for drives in his Bentley. Valerie gets a job editing a magazine for teenagers.

== Cast ==
- Anna Neagle as Valerie Carr
- Sylvia Syms as Janet Carr
- Norman Wooland as Hugh Manning
- Wilfrid Hyde-White as Sir Joseph
- Kenneth Haigh as Tony Ward Black
- Julia Lockwood as Poppet Carr
- Helen Haye as Aunt Louisa
- Josephine Fitzgerald as Aunt Bella
- Wanda Ventham as Gina
- Michael Shepley as Sir Henry
- Avice Landone as Barbara
- Michael Meacham as Mark
- Edie Martin as Miss Ellis
- Ballard Berkeley as magistrate
- Arthur Mullard as club bouncer
- Myrette Morven as Anne
- Grizelda Harvey as Miss Bennett
- Betty Cooper as Celia
- Daphne Cave as Deirdre
- Launce Maraschal as senator

== Production ==
Neagle and Wilcox commissioned playwright Felicity Douglas to write a script about the generation gap. It was known during filming as I Have a Teenaged Daughter.

Janette Scott and Shirley Eaton were announced as possible's to play the daughter of Anna Neagle. Wilcox ended up casting Sylvia Syms after seeing her in a television play, The Romantic Young Lady. She recalled, "I was crashingly ignorant and very young, and Anna and Herbert cosseted me and spoiled me. They made my part bigger as I went along... Their generosity was incredible. They didn't pay me much but it was more than I was paid for my subsequent films [under a long-term contract with Associated British]." Julia Lockwood, who plays Anna Neagle's youngest daughter, was the daughter of Margaret Lockwood.

It as shot at Shepperton Studios in Surrey. The film's sets were designed by the art director William Kellner.

Syms said when the film came out "I was, as they say, an overnight sensation" but she "had saddled myself with a seven year contract" with Associated British.

== Reception ==
The Monthly Film Bulletin wrote: "My Teenage Daughter deserves some credit for attempting a topical "problem" subject. It emerges, however, as a very British, somewhat lukewarm Rebel Without a Cause, which skirts around its subject without ever convincing one that its authors are really anxious about the problem. Jan's delinquency is tritely expressed in her repeated assertion, "I want to lead my own life", and in the fact that she finds jive "madly exciting". About Tony, the script is ambiguous: one never discovers whether he is meant to be really corrupt or merely "mixed up", and the fortuitous manner of the aunt's death makes the climax seem absurdly contrived. Anna Neagle gives a rather bleak performance as the harassed widow. Sylvia Syms is competent but undistinctive as Jan. Kenneth Haigh, in his first film, gives a highly mannered though effective "rebel" performance as Tony."

Variety called it "an unabashed sentimental drama, obviously conceived as unsophisticated entertainment... should prove a stout b.o. proposition where the name value of Anna Neagle has potent marquee appeal."

Filmink said the film "was described as Britain's answer to Rebel Without a Cause, and in a way that's true, in that it's about a middle-class teen going off the rails, although it pays far more attention to the adult characters than the Nick Ray-James Dean classic.

== Bibliography ==
- Harper, Sue & Porter, Vincent. British Cinema of the 1950s: The Decline of Deference. Oxford University Press, 2007.
- Threadgall, Derek. Shepperton Studios: An Independent View. British Film Institute, 1994.
