= Adam and Evelyne =

1949 British film by Harold French

- Poster with the American title
- Directed by: Harold French
- Written by: Noel Langley (story); George Barraud; Nicholas Phipps; Lesley Storm
- Produced by: Harold French
- Starring: Stewart Granger; Jean Simmons
- Production company: Two Cities Films
- Distributed by: Rank Films
- Release date: 31 May 1949
- Running time: 70 minutes
- Country: United Kingdom
- Language: English
- Box office: 189,023 admissions (France)

Adam and Evelyne (U.S.title: Adam and Evalyn) is a 1949 British romance film directed by Harold French and starring Stewart Granger and Jean Simmons. It was written by George Barraud, Nicholas Phipps and Lesley Storm, based on a story by Noel Langley.

According to Robert Osborne, host of Turner Classic Movies, the leads suited the stars, as they were romantically involved at the time, despite their age difference. They married the next year.

== Plot ==
When jockey Chris Kirby is fatally injured in a horse race, he gets his best friend, gambler Adam Black, to promise to take care of his teenage daughter, Evelyne, who has been raised apart from her father. Unbeknownst to Adam, Evelyne had been led to believe that Adam is her father in correspondence between parent and child. Adam is unable to tell her the truth; his butler and friend Bill Murray tries and fails as well. Finally, Adam's sometime girlfriend Moira breaks the news to the girl.

Adam sends Evelyne to an exclusive boarding school. When she has grown up, she reappears unexpectedly in his life. Because of the hatred she has for gambling, Adam does not reveal that he stages illegal gambling sessions; instead he tells her that he makes his money on the stock exchange. She begins casually dating Adam's no-good brother Roddy.

When Adam tells Moira that he is getting out of the business, she accuses him of being in love with his "ward". Roddy has his own grudge against his brother – Adam refuses to finance a shady deal – and the two of them tip off the police about Adam's last operation. Roddy also brings Evelyne to see what Adam really does for a living.

Shocked, she quarrels with Adam and leaves. A kindly gambler, Colonel Bradley, gives her some sage advice and persuades her to reconcile with Adam.

== Cast ==
- Stewart Granger as Adam Black
- Jean Simmons as Evelyne Kirby
- Edwin Styles as Bill Murray
- Raymond Young as Roddy Black
- Helen Cherry as Moira
- Beatrice Varley as Mrs. Parker, a gambler
- Joan Swinstead as Molly
- Wilfred Hyde-White as Colonel Bradley
- Fred Johnson as Chris Kirby
- Geoffrey Denton as Police Inspector Collins
- Peter Reynolds as David
- Mona Washbourne as Mrs Salop

== Production ==
Despite no on-screen credit, Stewart Granger said the storyline of the film was his, based on the 1919 silent film Daddy Long Legs; he said contacted the writer Noel Langley and they wrote it as a vehicle for Jean Simmons. "It was a very good vehicle for her", he said. "It was a sweet film, a charming light comedy.

Director Harold French also said he "really liked" the film.

At that stage I could pick and choose and I really liked that one. I became producer because Paul Soskin, who was to have produced it, didn’t like the fact that I had employed an actor called Edwin Styles for the part of the valet; I thought he was quite good and he got on well with Jimmy [Stewart] Granger in his first comedy role. Paul said he wanted to go back to America, and would I take over as producer? I didn't mind ... I did enjoy that film and I adored working with Jean Simmons, a lovely actress.

This was the first adult role of Jean Simmons, who had become a star in Great Expectations (1946).

Simmons and Granger were rumoured to be romantically involved during filming although they denied it to the press.

Production of the film was interrupted by a strike from crew members at Denham Studios in protest over recent sackings of film workers.

== Reception ==
=== Box office ===
The film was successful at the box office in Britain.

=== Critical ===
The Monthly Film Bulletin wrote: "Some compensation for the lack of originality in the story may be found in the acting. Stewart Granger is competent as Adam, while Jean Simmons cleverly portrays the change from pathetic child to beautiful, assured young woman. Her love scenes with Stewart Granger are discreetly acted. Helen Cherry contributes a lively performance as Moira and Edwin Stiles plays Adam's sympathetic manservant."

Variety wrote: "Novelettish theme of Noel Langley's original story has been brightened by luxury backgrounds, piquant romantic situations and the attractive starring team of Stewart Granger and Jean Simmons. Result is an agreeable lightweight entertainment offering, capable of earning modest grosses in the U.S. ... Crisp direction and some snappy bits of dialog give the pic a veneer of polish without attempting to appear sophisticated. Teamed for the first time, Granger and Miss Sim-mons prove to be pleasing romantic leads. Transformation of the femme star from waif to womanhood is skillfully done. Edwin Styles and Helen Cherry tackle the top supporting parts with ease."

Critic Leonard Maltin called it a "Pleasant but ordinary tale".

Filmink called it "a dodgy comedy where Jean Simmons falls in love with her adopted father Stewart Granger, and we’re meant to find it sweet."

== Accolades ==
The film was voted best comedy of the year at the International Film Festival in Locarno, Switzerland.
