= William C. Andrews (art director) =

- Born: 1901; London, England
- Died: 1986 (aged 84–85); Buckinghamshire, England
- Other names: W. C. Andrews, Bill Andrews
- Occupation: Art director
- Years active: 1942–1972

William C. Andrews (1901–1986), also credited as W. C. Andrews and Bill Andrews, was a British art director born in London. He worked on films from 1942 to 1972, among them Anastasia, I'm All Right Jack and Lolita.

== Career ==
Andrews was associate art director on In Which We Serve (1942), working under David Rawnsley. He was designer on Herbert Wilcox's Maytime in Mayfair (1949) and art director on The Lady with a Lamp (1951). He was credited as Bill Andrews on Mysterious Island (1961), Lolita (1962) and Submarine X-1 (1968). Tim Bergfelder names Andrews among the dominant art directors of 1940s British cinema, who succeeded the immigrant art directors of the 1920s and 1930s.

Variety called his small submarines and other designs in Submarine X-1 excellent.

== Selected filmography ==
- In Which We Serve (1942), associate art director
- Hotel Reserve (1944)
- Elizabeth of Ladymead (1948)
- Maytime in Mayfair (1949)
- The Lady with a Lamp (1951)
- Trent's Last Case (1952)
- The Beggar's Opera (1953)
- Trouble in the Glen (1954)
- Anastasia (1956)
- Island in the Sun (1957)
- The Silent Enemy (1958)
- The Horse's Mouth (1958)
- I'm All Right Jack (1959)
- Mysterious Island (1961)
- Lolita (1962)
- Follow the Boys (1963)
- Murder Ahoy! (1964)
- The Alphabet Murders (1965)
- Submarine X-1 (1968)
- Hot Millions (1968)
- Captain Nemo and the Underwater City (1969)
