= Spring in Park Lane =

- Directed by: Herbert Wilcox
- Written by: Nicholas Phipps
- Based on: Come Out of the Kitchen by Alice Duer Miller
- Produced by: Herbert Wilcox
- Starring: Anna Neagle; Michael Wilding; Tom Walls; Peter Graves
- Cinematography: Max Greene
- Edited by: Frank Clarke
- Music by: Robert Farnon
- Production company: Wilcox-Neagle Productions
- Distributed by: British Lion Film Corporation
- Release date: 17 March 1948
- Running time: 91 minutes
- Country: United Kingdom
- Language: English
- Budget: £238,000
- Box office: £358,788^{(UK; profit margin returned to the distributor)} or $1.8 million (UK gross)

Spring in Park Lane is a 1948 British romantic comedy film produced and directed by Herbert Wilcox which starred Anna Neagle, Michael Wilding and Tom Walls. Part of a series of films partnering Neagle and Wilding, it was the top film at the British box office in 1948 and remains the most popular entirely British-made film ever in terms of all-time attendance. It was shot at the Elstree Studios of MGM British, with sets designed by the art director William C. Andrews. Some location shooting also took place in London.

== Plot ==
A footman, Richard, is employed by Joshua Howard, an eccentric art collector. His niece and secretary, Judy, has her doubts that Richard is the footman he pretends to be. In fact, he is Lord Brent, brother of one of Judy's suitors - George, the Marquess of Borechester.

Before his arrival in the Howard domestic household, Richard went to America to sell some old paintings to restore his aristocratic family's fortunes, but on the way back received a message that the cheque he was given for the paintings is invalid. Richard subsequently decided to 'hide' until he saved enough money to return to America. Over time as a footman, Judy notices how knowledgeable Richard is about many cultural things from art, poetry, music and dancing and begins to suspect he is not who he says he is. Things become interesting when his brother visits as one of Judy's suitors.

Through their various interactions, Richard and Judy fall in love, and as he is about to return to America they discover that the cheque for his family's paintings was valid after all.

== Cast ==
- Anna Neagle as Judy, niece and secretary to Mr Howard
- Michael Wilding as "Richard"
- Tom Walls as Joshua Howard, Judy's wealthy uncle
- Peter Graves as Basil Maitland, an actor and suitor to Judy
- Marjorie Fielding as Mildred Howard, Judy's mother
- Nigel Patrick as Mr Bacon, an 'art-dealer' (con-man)
- G. H. Mulcaster as Perkins, the butler
- Josephine Fitzgerald as Mrs Kate O'Malley, the cook
- Lana Morris as Rosie, the maid
- Nicholas Phipps as George, The Marquess of Borechester and Richard's elder brother (Phipps also wrote the screenplay)
- Catherine Paul as The Marchioness of Borechester and George & Richard's mother

== Reception ==
=== Box-office ===
Spring in Park Lane was the most successful film release of 1948 in the United Kingdom. According to Kinematograph Weekly, the "biggest winner" at the box office in 1948 Britain was The Best Years of Our Lives, with Spring in Park Lane being the British film with the largest box-office takings.

The film reportedly recouped £280,193 in the UK. According to another account, as of 30 June 1949 the film had grossed £1.4 million at the domestic box office in Britain, but after Entertainment Tax (£560,000), exhibitors’ share (£462,000), distributor's fee (£75,000) and the costs of prints and advertising (£15,000), the producer's share was £280,000.

In a 2004 survey by the BFI, it was ranked fifth in the all-time attendance figures for the United Kingdom, with a total attendance of 20.5 million, still the largest figure for a wholly British-made film. Wilcox claimed that the film earned £1,600,000 at the British box office.

=== Reviews ===
Reviews were generally positive, Variety said, "incident upon incident carry merry laughter through the picture". and The New York Times described it as "attractively witty".

A follow-up, Maytime in Mayfair, was released the following year.

== Soundtrack ==
Robert Farnon provides the soundtrack, his light orchestral version of the folk tune "Early One Morning" proving particularly popular at the time.
