= I Live in Grosvenor Square =

- Directed by: Herbert Wilcox
- Written by: Maurice Cowan (story); William D. Bayles; Arvid david Nicholas Phipps
- Produced by: Herbert Wilcox
- Starring: Anna Neagle; Rex Harrison; Dean Jagger; Robert Morley
- Cinematography: Mutz Greenbaum; Otto Heller
- Music by: Anthony Collins
- Production companies: Associated British Picture Corporation; Herbert Wilcox Productions
- Distributed by: Associated British Picture
- Release dates: 15 May 1945 (London); 3 September 1945 (United Kingdom); 3 March 1946 (United States)
- Running time: 114 minutes
- Country: United Kingdom
- Language: English
- Box office: $1 million (US)

I Live in Grosvenor Square is a British comedy-drama romance war film directed and produced by Herbert Wilcox. It was the first of Wilcox's "London films" collaboration with his wife, actress Anna Neagle. Her co-stars were Dean Jagger and Rex Harrison. The plot is set in a context of US-British wartime co-operation, and displays icons of popular music with the purpose of harmonising relationships on both sides of the Atlantic. An edited version was distributed in the United States, with two additional scenes filmed in Hollywood, under the title A Yank in London.

== Plot ==
In the summer of 1943, after he is taken off combat operations for medical reasons, American Staff Sergeant John Patterson (Dean Jagger), an Army Air Force gunner, is billeted in the London home of the Duke of Exmoor (Robert Morley) in London's Grosvenor Square. He is befriended by the duke and British paratrooper Major David Bruce (Rex Harrison). The latter has taken leave from the army to contest a parliamentary by-election in Devon.

On a weekend visit to the duke's estate near Exmoor in Devon, Patterson meets the duke's granddaughter, Lady Patricia Fairfax (Anna Neagle), who is also a corporal in the Women's Auxiliary Air Force. However, she is David's childhood sweetheart. After a cool beginning, distanced on cultural misunderstandings, they fall in love. David is unaware of what is happening until the final night before the election, when it becomes clear to him during a party on the estate. The next day, the duke learns that his estate has been appropriated by the American army for a base and that David has lost the election.

David and Patricia argue, and David plans to return to active service.

When Patterson realises that Pat and David have long expected to marry, he contrives to obtain medical clearance to go back to combat duty. David realises that Pat still loves Patterson and arranges for them to reunite. Returning from a mission with heavy battle damage, Patterson attempts to help his pilot land their B-17 Flying Fortress at an emergency landing strip at Exmoor, but is killed when the bomber stalls as they manoeuvre to avoid crashing in the village. The plane explodes killing everyone. Ironically it is Pat who takes the message listing the dead.

The duke and his family mourn Patterson at a memorial service in the village church, and an American flag is presented to be hung in the school. The vicar reads out the names of the crew who died to save the village.

David is seen in the co-pilot's seat, flying with his paratrooper unit to parachute into France (implying but not stating that it is D-Day).

The film ends with a poem by Walt Whitman regarding the relationship between the USA and Britain.

== Cast ==
- Anna Neagle as Lady Patricia Fairfax, granddaughter of the Duke of Exmoor
- Rex Harrison as Major David Bruce
- Dean Jagger as Staff Sergeant John Patterson
- Robert Morley as The Duke of Exmoor
- Nancy Price as Mrs Wilson
- Dame Irene Vanbrugh as Mrs. Mildred Catchpole, cousin of the Duke of Exmoor
- Jane Darwell as Mrs Patterson
- Elliott Arluck as Sergeant Benjie Greenburg
- Walter Hudd as Vicar
- Edward Rigby as Innkeeper
- Cecil Ramage as Trewhewy
- Irene Manning as herself - U.S.O. Singer
- Francis Pierlot as Postman
- Aubrey Mallalieu as Bates
- Michael Shepley as Lieutenant Lutyens

Notable supporting players included Charles Victor, Ronald Shiner, Percy Walsh, Brenda Bruce, Shelagh Fraser, John Slater, Alvar Lidell, David Horne, Robert Farnon and Carroll Gibbons.

The Canadian Band of the AEF appears with bandleader/arranger Captain Robert Farnon. They filmed their sequence in late 1944.

== Reception ==
Wilcox later said Rex Harrison was the greatest actor whom he had ever directed "without a doubt". He planned on making more films with Harrison but the actor received a contract offer from 20th Century Fox and left for Hollywood.

=== Box office ===
The film was popular at the British box office. According to Kinematograph Weekly the "biggest winners" at the box office in 1945 Britain were The Seventh Veil, with "runners up" being (in release order), Madonna of the Seven Moons, Old Acquaintance, Frenchman's Creek, Mrs. Parkington, Arsenic and Old Lace, Meet Me in St Louis, A Song to Remember, Since You Went Away, Here Come the Waves, Tonight and Every Night, Hollywood Canteen, They Were Sisters, The Princess and the Pirate, The Affairs of Susan, National Velvet, Mr. Skeffington, I Live in Grosvenor Square, Nob Hill, Perfect Strangers, The Valley of Decision, Conflict and Duffy's Tavern. British "runners up" were They Were Sisters, I Live in Grosvenor Square, Perfect Strangers, Madonna of the Seven Moons, Waterloo Road, Blithe Spirit, The Way to the Stars, I'll Be Your Sweetheart, Dead of Night, Waltz Time and Henry V.

=== Critical ===
Critic Bosley Crowther wrote in The New York Times, "There is much that is admirable about A Yank in London, and the glimpses of Irene Manning singing for the boys at the Rainbow Corner in Piccadilly will stir memories. But the picture, like the script, is diffuse, and Mr. Wilcox in his direction permits scenes to dissolve in a rambling, confusing style"; while more recently TV Guide called it "An entertaining but overlong romance."
