= The Courtneys of Curzon Street =

1947 British film by Herbert Wilcox

- Opening titles
- Directed by: Herbert Wilcox
- Written by: Florence Tranter (story); Nicholas Phipps
- Produced by: George Maynard; Herbert Wilcox
- Starring: Anna Neagle; Michael Wilding
- Cinematography: Mutz Greenbaum
- Edited by: Vera Campbell; Flora Newton
- Music by: Anthony Collins
- Production company: Herbert Wilcox Productions (as Imperadio)
- Distributed by: British Lion Films(UK)
- Release date: 11 April 1947
- Running time: 120 minutes (UK); 112 minutes (US)
- Country: United Kingdom
- Language: English
- Budget: £315,810
- Box office: £317,836 (UK)

The Courtneys of Curzon Street (also titled The Courtney Affair, and Kathy's Love Affair, in the U.S.) is a 1947 British drama film directed by Herbert Wilcox and starring Anna Neagle and Michael Wilding. It was written by Nicholas Phipps based on a story by Florence Tranter.

== Plot ==
Edward Courtney, the son of a baronet shocks class-conscious 1900 British society by marrying Kate, his Irish servant. The film chronicles 45 years in their lives together and apart, through the Boer War and World War I and World War II.

The family live on Curzon Street, a high class street in the Mayfair district of London.

Kate begins to feel the awkwardness at a musical recital before Queen Victoria, where all the "true ladies" are staring at her. Later she hears gossip about herself.

Edward is an officer in the Horse Guards but Kate does not realise he cannot return her wave when he is on duty. She packs her bags and leaves without telling Edward. She returns to Ireland then develops an idea to be an actress, adopting the stage name of "May Lynton".

Meanwhile Edward goes in India where he accidentally finds the truth as to why she left.

Kate takes up her career as a singer in the theatre. Her father-in-law visits her backstage and gives her an update whilst trying to retain her separate identity. He says his wife is now dead... she missed her son and his wife too much. Kate also updates him, saying her father was killed at the Battle of Spion Kop.

The First World War starts and Edward returns from India and finds Kate. She confesses they have a son, also called Edward (Teddy). They go to visit him at his boarding school. The absence has been long as he is around 12 years old. They go out for high tea and discuss cricket and the new Rupert Brooke poem "The Soldier". The war ends.

Edward's father dies and he inherits the baronetcy. Kate becomes Lady Courtney. Meanwhile Teddy has joined the Army. He becomes engaged and marries before being posted to India. While his pregnant young wife is reading one of his letters home, a telegram arrives telling her that he has been killed in action. Devastated, she gives birth but dies in the process. Edward and Kate raise him. Edward loses badly in the 1929 Wall Street crash but they hang onto their home after Kate goes back on the stage. The Second World War sees Edward back as a Colonel in the Army and Kate an ENSA entertainer. They survive a fire at a factory and the film ends with their soldier grandson introducing his intended. While they are happy that the old class prejudices that bedevilled their marriage have gone they are bemused that the parents of the intended are less sanguine. Fade to end credits.

== Cast ==
- Anna Neagle as Kate O'Halloran
- Michael Wilding as Sir Edward Courtney
- Gladys Young as Lady Courtney
- Daphne Slater as Cynthia Carmody
- Jack Watling as Teddy Courtney as a boy
- Michael Medwin as Teddy Courtney as a man
- Edgar Norfolk as Mr. W.
- Edward Rigby as Mr R.
- G. H. Mulcaster as Sir Edward Courtney Sr.
- Coral Browne as Valerie
- Alice Gachet as Louise
- Helen Cherry as Mary Courtney
- Ethel O'Shea as Mrs. O'Halloran
- Terry Randall as Pam
- Thora Hird as Maud
- Nicholas Phipps as Phipps
- Bernard Lee as Colonel Gascoyne
- Gene Crowley as himself
- Max Kirby as Algy Longworth
- Percy Walsh as Sir Frank Murchison

== Production ==
It was originally known as Scarlet and Pure Gold. The film was produced at the Shepperton Film Studios in Surrey.

== Reception ==
=== Box office ===
It was the most popular film at the British box office for 1947. According to Kinematograph Weekly it was the 'biggest winner' at the box office in 1947 Britain. The same magazine wrote that Wilcox, Neagle and Wilding "have built up a team that has captured the affection and esteem of practically all classes of audiences. The highbrows may disagree with the verdict, but the film industry is determined to carry on, whether they approve or not, and while the world is waiting for them to write the perfect script, Herbert Wilcox and Company are more than playing their parts in maintaining boxoffice receipts." As of 30 June 1949 the film earned £328,668 in the UK of which £238,731 went to the producer.

=== Critical ===
The Monthly Film Bulletin wrote: "It may be a pot-boiler, but it is a pleasant and for many a nostalgic one where the audience can laugh, cry, suffer and hum the well-known songs of three wars. It is far from being a brilliant film and mistakes are numerous. Though British, the dignity of Curzon Street is Hollywoodised, and it is rare, in 1945, that people in the sixties look as if they have one foot in the grave. Michael Wilding is at his best, and Anna Neagle with her usual charm knows all the tricks of the trade."

Kine Weekly wrote: "Anna Neagle is a sweet, sensitive and vital Cathy. She is easily the most accomplished trouper on the British screen to-day. Michael Wilding is a handsome and, within the limits of his part, manly Edward, and Gladys Young, Coral Browne, Daphne Salter, and Jack Watlin head a first-rate supporting team."

The New York Times wrote that: "the romantic drama creaks soggily through three generations."

Film4.com called the film an "entertaining romantic saga spanning three generations."
