= Anna Neagle =

English stage and film actress and singer (1904–1986)

Dame Anna Neagle DBE
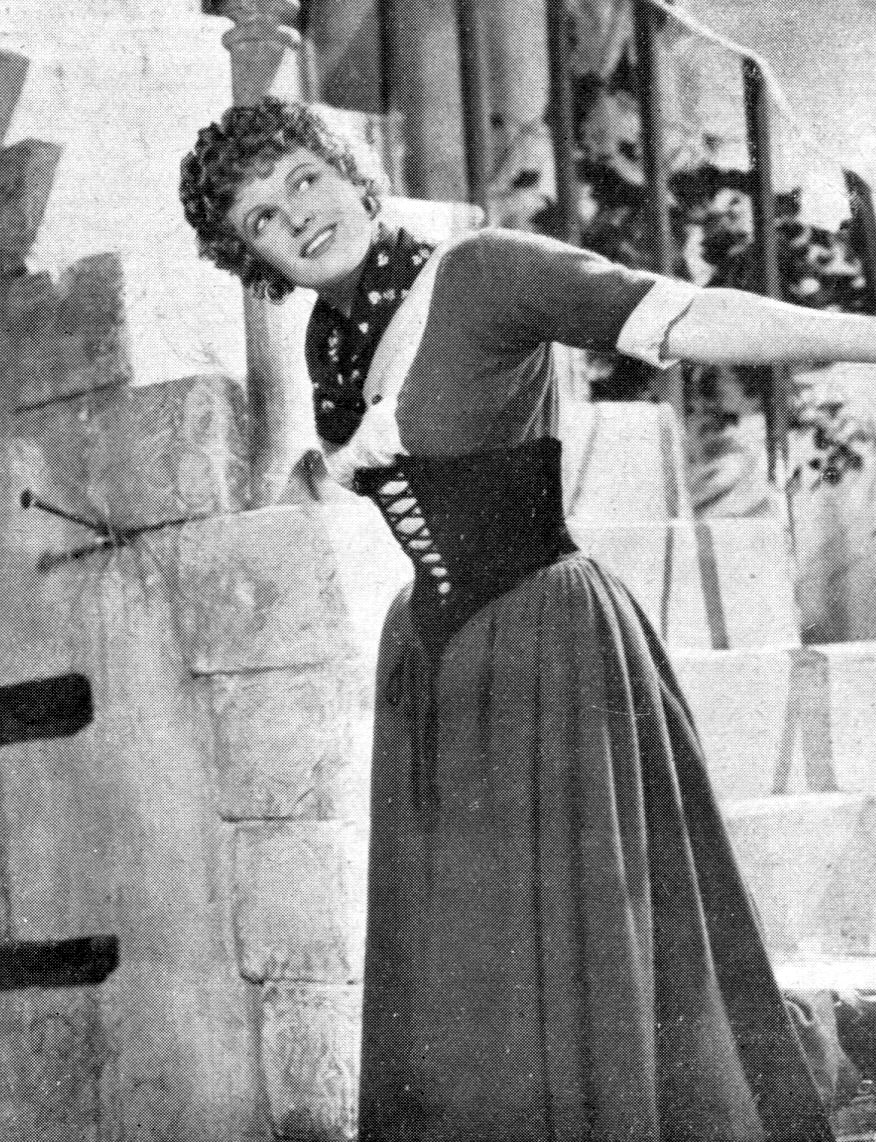
- Neagle in 1935
- Born: Florence Marjorie Robertson; 20 October 1904; Forest Gate, Essex, England
- Died: 3 June 1986 (aged 81); West Byfleet, Surrey, England
- Resting place: City of London Cemetery, Manor Park, London, England
- Occupations: Actress, singer
- Years active: 1917–1986
- Spouse: Herbert Wilcox (m. 1943; died 1977)
- Relatives: Nicholas Hoult (grand-nephew)

Dame Florence Marjorie Wilcox (née Robertson; 20 October 1904 – 3 June 1986), known professionally as Anna Neagle, was an English stage and film actress, singer, and dancer.

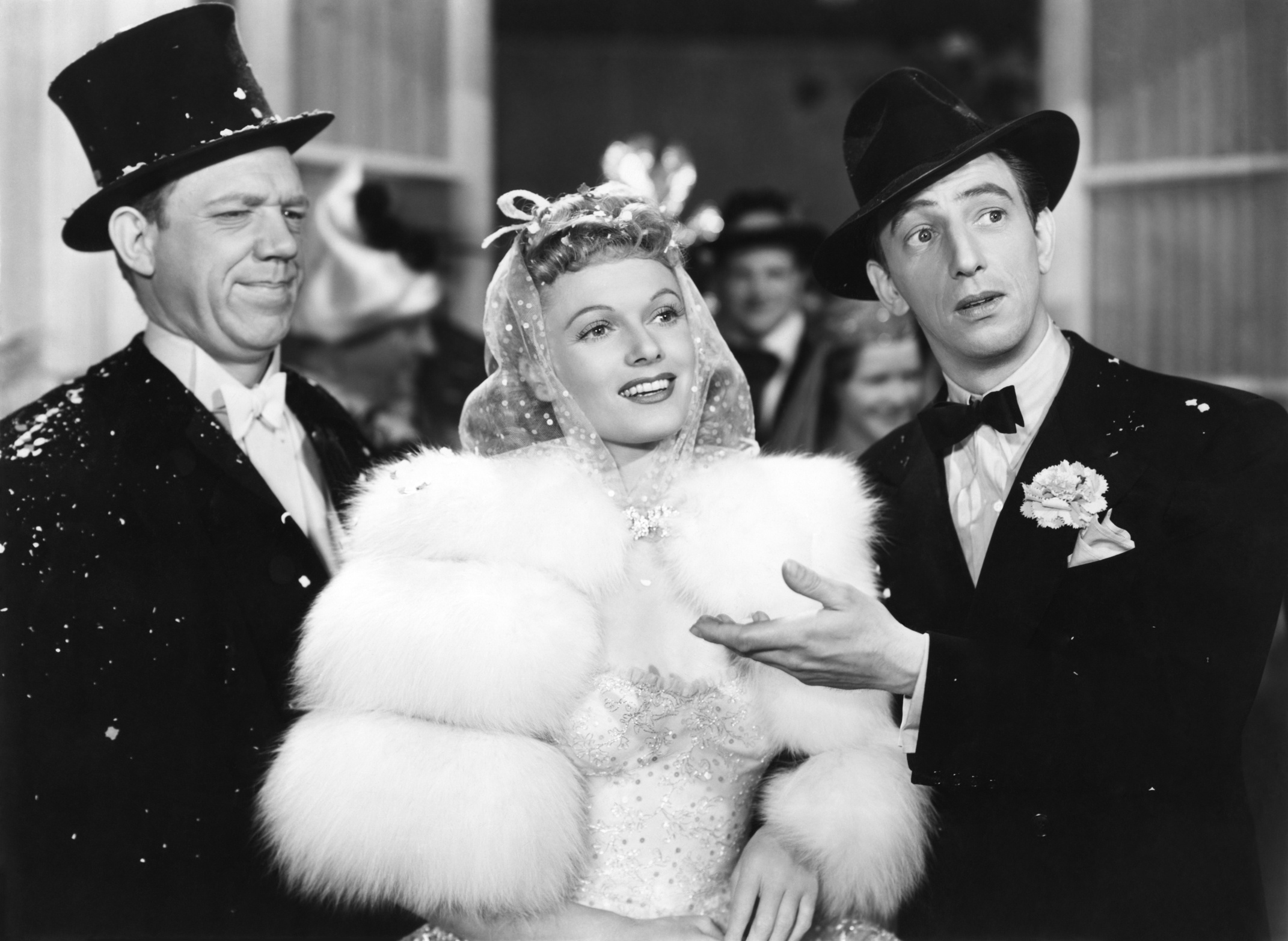
Neagle with Paul Hartman and Ray Bolger in the film Sunny

She was a successful box-office draw in British cinema for 20 years and was voted the most popular star in Britain in 1949. She was known for providing glamour and sophistication to war-torn London audiences with her lightweight musicals, comedies, and historical dramas. Almost all of her films were produced and directed by Herbert Wilcox, whom she married in 1943.

In her historical dramas, Neagle was renowned for her portrayals of British historical figures, including Nell Gwyn (Nell Gwyn, 1934), Queen Victoria (Victoria the Great, 1937 and Sixty Glorious Years, 1938), Edith Cavell (Nurse Edith Cavell, 1939), and Florence Nightingale (The Lady with a Lamp, 1951).

== Biography ==
=== Early life ===
Florence Marjorie Robertson was born in Forest Gate, Essex, the daughter of Merchant Navy captain Herbert William Robertson and Florence, née Neagle. Her elder brother was the bass-baritone and actor Stuart Robertson (1901–1958). She made her stage debut as a dancer in 1917, and later appeared in the chorus of C.B. Cochran's revues and also André Charlot's revue Bubbly. While with Cochran, she understudied Jessie Matthews.

In 1931, she starred in the West End musical Stand Up and Sing with actor Jack Buchanan, who encouraged her to take a featured role. For this play, she began using the professional name Anna Neagle (the surname being her mother's maiden name). The play was a success with a total run of 604 performances. Stand Up and Sing provided her big break when film producer and director Herbert Wilcox caught the show to consider Buchanan for an upcoming film, but also took note of her cinematic potential.

=== Cinematic beginnings ===
"Naturally enough when I was a young dancer, I was terribly anxious to get ahead, and to get ahead quickly. I was impatient with all those older people who talked of the long grind to the top, who turned me down for jobs I knew I could do."

— Anna Neagle

Forming a professional alliance with Wilcox, Neagle played her first starring film role in the musical Goodnight, Vienna (1932), again with Jack Buchanan. With this film, Neagle became an overnight favourite. Although the film cost a mere £23,000 to produce, it was a hit at the box office, with profits from its Australian release alone being £150,000.

After her starring role in The Flag Lieutenant (also 1932), directed by and co-starring Henry Edwards, she worked exclusively under Wilcox's direction for all but one of her subsequent films, becoming one of Britain's biggest stars.

She continued in the musical genre, co-starring with Fernand Gravey (later known as Fernand Gravet) in Bitter Sweet (1933). This first version of Noël Coward's tale of ill-fated lovers was later obscured by the better-known Jeanette MacDonald–Nelson Eddy remake in 1940.

Neagle had her first major success with Nell Gwyn (1934), which Wilcox had previously shot as a silent starring Dorothy Gish in 1926. Neagle's performance as Gwyn, who became the mistress of Charles II (played by Cedric Hardwicke) prompted some censorship in the United States. The Hays Office had Wilcox add an (historically false) scene featuring the two leads getting married and also a "framing" story resulting in an entirely different ending. Graham Greene, then a film critic, said of Nell Gwyn: "I have seen few things more attractive than Miss Neagle in breeches".

Two years after Nell Gwyn, she followed up with another real-life figure, portraying Irish actress Peg Woffington in Peg of Old Drury (1936). That same year, she appeared in Limelight, a backstage film musical in which she played a chorus girl. Her co-star was Arthur Tracy, who had gained fame in the United States as a radio performer known as the Street Singer. The film also featured Jack Buchanan in an uncredited cameo. performing "Goodnight Vienna".

Neagle and Wilcox followed with a circus trapeze fable Three Maxims (1937), which was released in the United States as The Show Goes On. The film, with a script featuring a contribution from Herman J. Mankiewicz (later to co-write Citizen Kane with Orson Welles), had Neagle performing her own high-wire acrobatics. Although now highly successful in films, Neagle continued acting on the stage. In 1934, while working under director Robert Atkins, she performed as Rosalind in As You Like It and Olivia in Twelfth Night. Both productions earned her critical accolades, despite the fact that she had never performed Shakespearean roles before.

In 1937, Neagle gave her most prestigious performance so far – as Queen Victoria in the historical drama Victoria the Great (1937), co-starring Anton Walbrook as Prince Albert. The script by Robert Vansittart and Miles Malleson (from Laurence Housman's play Victoria Regina) alternated between the political and the personal lives of the royal couple. The Diamond Jubilee sequence that climaxed the film was shot in Technicolor. Victoria the Great was such an international success that it resulted in Neagle and Walbrook playing their roles again in an all-Technicolor sequel entitled Sixty Glorious Years (1938), co-starring C. Aubrey Smith as the Duke of Wellington. While the first of these films was in release, Neagle returned to the London stage and entertained audiences with her portrayal of the title role in Peter Pan.

=== An American Excursion ===
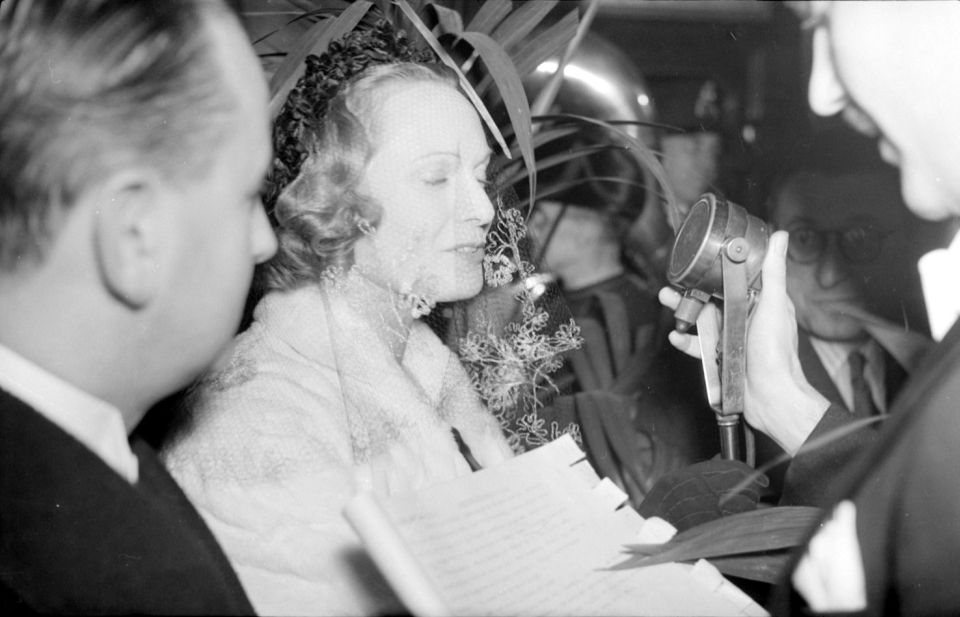
Neagle giving a radio interview in Montreal in 1937

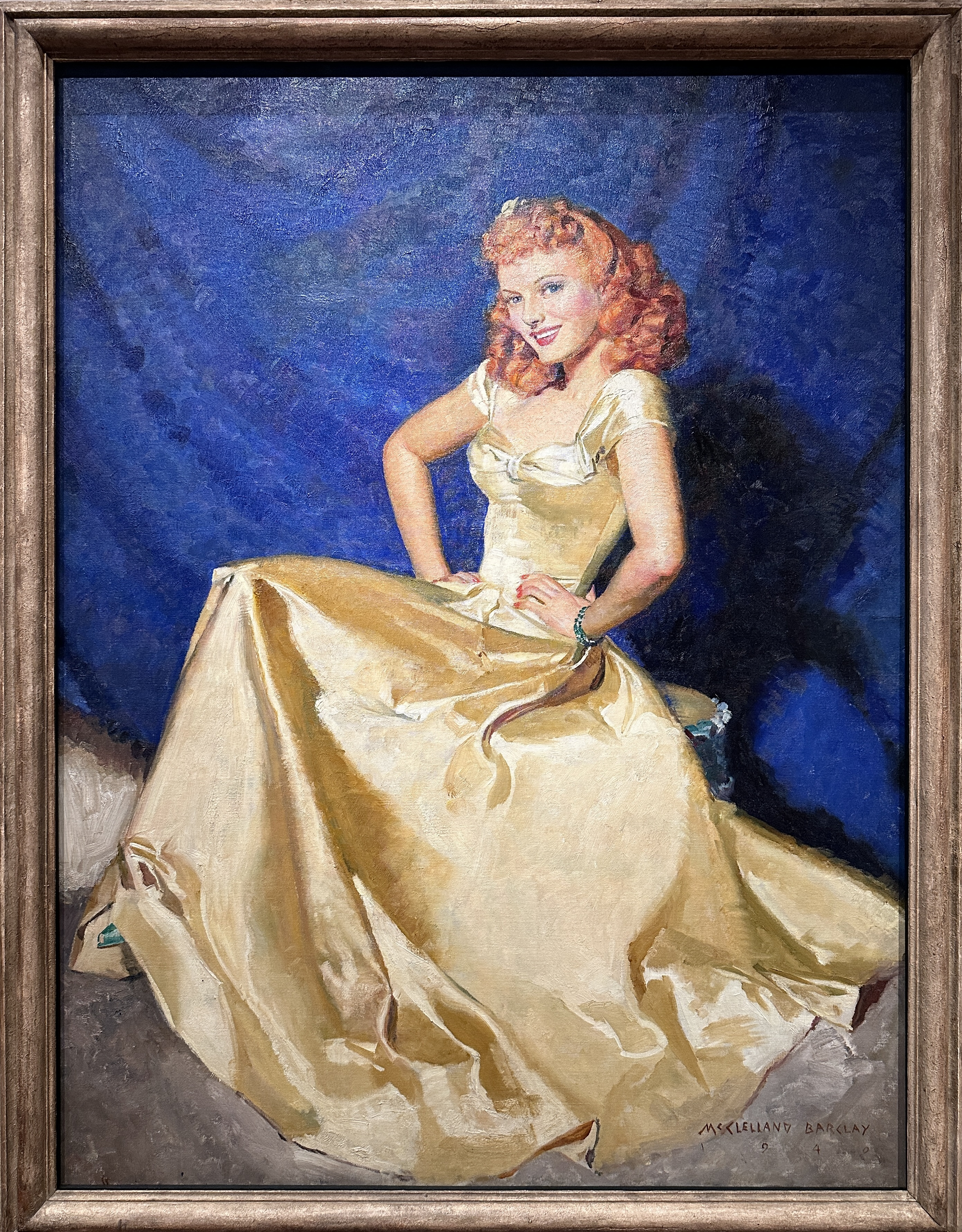
A 1940 portrait of Neagle by McClelland Barclay in the National Gallery, London

The success of Victoria the Great and Sixty Glorious Years caused Hollywood studios to take notice. Neagle and Wilcox began an association with RKO Radio Pictures. Their first American film was Nurse Edith Cavell (1939), a remake of Dawn, a Wilcox silent that starred Sybil Thorndike. In this, another Neagle role based on an actual British heroine, she played the role of the nurse who was shot by the Germans in World War I, for allegedly aiding Allied PoWs to escape and for spying. The resulting effort had a significant impact for audiences on the eve of the WWII.

In a turnabout from this serious drama, the couple followed with three musical comedies, all based on once-popular stage plays. The first of these was Irene (1940), co-starring Ray Milland. It included a Technicolor sequence, which featured Neagle singing the play's most famous song, "Alice Blue Gown". She followed this film with No, No, Nanette (1940) with Victor Mature, in which she sang "Tea For Two", and Sunny (1941), with Ray Bolger.

Neagle and Wilcox's final American film was Forever and a Day (1943), a tale of a London family house from 1804 to the 1940 blitz. This film boasts 80 performers (mostly expatriate British), including Ray Milland, C. Aubrey Smith, Claude Rains, Charles Laughton, and – among the few North Americans – Buster Keaton. Wilcox directed the sequence featuring Neagle, Milland, Smith, and Rains, while other directors who worked on the film included René Clair, Edmund Goulding, Frank Lloyd, Victor Saville, and Robert Stevenson. During the war, the profits and salaries were given to war relief. After the war, prints were intended to be destroyed, so that no one could profit from them, but this never occurred.

=== Return to the UK ===
Returning to the UK, Neagle and Wilcox commenced with They Flew Alone (1942; shot after but released before Forever and a Day). Neagle this time played aviator Amy Johnson, who had recently died in a flying accident. Robert Newton co-starred as Johnson's husband, Jim Mollison. The film intercut the action with newsreel footage.

Neagle and Wilcox married in August 1943 at London's Caxton Hall.

They continued with Yellow Canary (1943), co-starring Richard Greene and Margaret Rutherford. In this spy story, Neagle plays a German-sympathiser (or at least that is what she seems to be at first), who is forced to go to Canada for her own safety. In reality, of course, she is working as an undercover agent out to expose a plot to blow up Halifax Harbour in Nova Scotia. Yellow Canary received positive comments for its atmospheric recreation of wartime conditions.

In 1945, Neagle appeared on stage in Emma, a dramatisation of Jane Austen's novel. That same year, she was seen in the film I Live in Grosvenor Square, co-starring Rex Harrison. She wanted Harrison for the lead in her next film, Piccadilly Incident (1946). However, he (as well as John Mills) proved to be unavailable at the time, so Wilcox cast Michael Wilding in the lead. Thus was born what film critic Godfrey Winn called "the greatest team in British films". The story – of a wife, presumed dead, returning to her (remarried) husband – bears a resemblance to the Irene Dunne–Cary Grant comedy My Favorite Wife. Piccadilly Incident was chosen as Picturegoer's Best Film of 1947. Despite the fact that Neagle was some eight years older than Wilding, they proved to be an extremely bankable romantic pairing at the British box office. By now in her mid-40s, Neagle continued to have success in youthful and romantic lead roles.

Neagle and Wilding were reunited in The Courtneys of Curzon Street (1947), a period drama that became the year's top box-office attraction. The film featured Wilding as an upper-class dandy and Neagle as the maid he marries, only to have the two of them driven apart by Victorian society.

The third pairing of Neagle and Wilding in the "London Films", as the series of films came to be called, was in Spring in Park Lane (1948). A comedy, this depicted the romance between a millionaire's niece and a footman (actually a nobleman who has seen better days). The script was written by Nicholas Phipps, who also played Wilding's brother. Although not a musical, it contains a dream sequence featuring the song "The Moment I Saw You". Spring in Park Lane was the 1949 Picturegoer winner for Best Film, Actor, and Actress. Neagle and Wilding were together for a fourth time in the Technicolor romance Maytime in Mayfair (1949). The plot is reminiscent of Roberta, as it had Wilding inheriting a dress shop owned by Neagle.

By now, Neagle was at her peak as Britain's top box-office actress, and she made what reputedly became her own favourite film, Odette (1950), co-starring Trevor Howard, Peter Ustinov, and Marius Goring. As Odette Sansom, she was the Anglo-French resistance fighter who was pushed to the edge of betrayal by the Nazis. In 1950, Neagle and Wilcox moved to the top-floor flat in Aldford House overlooking Park Lane, which was their home until 1964. She played Florence Nightingale in The Lady with a Lamp (1951), based on the 1929 play by Reginald Berkeley.

Returning to the stage in 1953, she scored a success with The Glorious Days, which had a run of 476 performances. Neagle and Wilcox brought the play to the screen under the title Lilacs in the Spring (1954), co-starring Errol Flynn. In the film, she plays an actress knocked out by a bomb, who dreams she is Queen Victoria and Nell Gwyn, as well as her own mother. As she begins dreaming, the film switches from black-and-white to colour. In Britain, where Neagle had top billing, the film was reasonably successful. In the United States, however, where Flynn had top billing, the title was changed to Let's Make Up, and it flopped, with limited bookings.

=== On the wane ===
Neagle and Flynn reteamed for a second film, King's Rhapsody (1955), based on an Ivor Novello musical and also starring Patrice Wymore (Flynn's wife at the time). Although Neagle performed several musical numbers for the film, most of them were cut from the final release, leaving her with essentially a supporting role. Shot in Eastmancolor and CinemaScope with location work near Barcelona, Spain, King's Rhapsody was a major flop everywhere. Neagle's (and Flynn's) box-office appeal, it seemed, was fading.

Neagle's last box-office hit was My Teenage Daughter (1956), which featured her as a mother trying to prevent her daughter (Sylvia Syms) from lapsing into juvenile delinquency.

Neagle and Syms worked together again on No Time for Tears (1957), also starring Anthony Quayle and Flora Robson. As directed by Cyril Frankel, this was the first film for over 20 years where Neagle was directed by someone other than Herbert Wilcox. Set in a children's hospital, the film features Neagle as a matron dealing with the problems of the patients and the staff, notably a nurse (Syms) infatuated with one of the doctors (George Baker).

With her husband, Neagle began producing films starring Frankie Vaughan, but these were out of touch with changing tastes, and lost money, resulting in Wilcox going heavily into debt. Neagle herself made her final film appearance in The Lady Is a Square (1959), also Wilcox's second last film as director.

Neagle was the subject of This Is Your Life on two occasions, in February 1958 when she was surprised by Eamonn Andrews at the BBC Television Theatre, and in March 1983, when Andrews surprised her at London's Royal National Hotel.

=== Final years ===
Herbert Wilcox was bankrupt by 1964, but his wife soon revived his fortunes. She returned to the stage the following year and made a comeback in the West End musical Charlie Girl. In it, she played the role of a former "Cochran Young Lady" who marries a peer of the realm. Charlie Girl was not a critical success, but it ran for six years and 2,047 performances. It earned Neagle an entry in the Guinness Book of World Records for her enduring popularity.

Two years after Charlie Girl – which she also performed in Australia and New Zealand – Neagle was asked to appear in a revival of No, No, Nanette, at the Theatre Royal Drury Lane, having appeared in the screen version three decades earlier. Later, in 1975, she replaced Celia Johnson in The Dame of Sark and, in 1978 (the year after her husband's death), she was acting in Most Gracious Lady, which was written for the Silver Jubilee of Queen Elizabeth II.

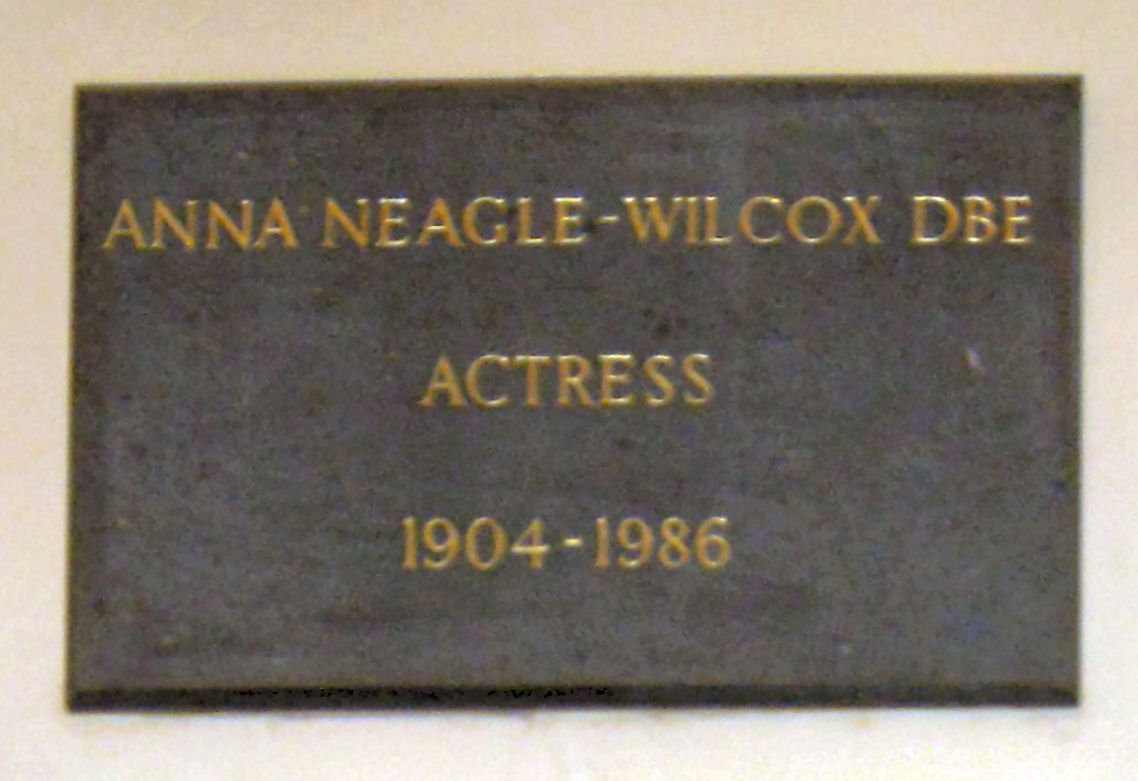
Memorial plaque to Neagle in St Paul's, Covent Garden

Although affected by Parkinson's disease in her last years, Neagle continued to be active. She appeared in Cameron Mackintosh's revival of My Fair Lady and in 1985 she appeared as the Fairy Godmother in a pantomime of Cinderella at the London Palladium.

Neagle's grand-nephew is actor Nicholas Hoult, through Hoult's father's side.

Neagle died aged 81 from breast cancer on 3 June 1986. A memorial service at Westminster Abbey followed on 20 October 1986. She was interred alongside her husband in the City of London Cemetery. Their grave was recommemorated by Princess Anne, the Princess Royal on 6 March 2014.

A memorial plaque on her former home at Aldford House, Park Lane was unveiled on 30 May 1996, by Princess Anne and Lana Morris. She also has a memorial plaque in St Paul's Church, the Actors' Church in Covent Garden.

A street named in her honour, Anna Neagle Close, is situated in Forest Gate, east London.

== Honours ==
Neagle was created a Commander of the Order of the British Empire (CBE) in the 1952 New Year Honours and, for her contributions to the theatre, a Dame Commander of the Order of the British Empire (DBE) in the 1969 Birthday Honours.

== Filmography ==
The following list contains all of Neagle's acting credits in feature-length films with the exception of Queen Victoria (1942), which is actually a compilation of two earlier films, Victoria the Great and Sixty Glorious Years. All of her films were directed by Herbert Wilcox and produced in the United Kingdom unless otherwise noted.

In addition, Neagle also appeared briefly as herself in a documentary short entitled The Volunteer (1943), and served as narrator for the films The Prams Break Through (1945) and Princess's Wedding Day (1947). Neagle also produced, but did not appear in, three films starring Frankie Vaughan: These Dangerous Years (1957), Wonderful Things (1957), and The Heart of a Man (1959).

Year	Title	Role	Notes
1929	Those Who Love	bit part	directed by H. Manning Haynes uncredited
1930	The School for Scandal	Flower Seller	directed by Maurice Elvey, filmed in Raycol color process, lost film uncredited
1930	The Chinese Bungalow	Charlotte	directed by Arthur Barnes and J.B. Williams
1930	Should A Doctor Tell?	Muriel Ashton	directed by H. Manning Haynes
1932	Goodnight, Vienna	Viki	Neagle's first collaboration with director Herbert Wilcox
1932	The Flag Lieutenant	Hermione Wynne	directed by Henry Edwards
1933	The Little Damozel	Julie Alardy	
1933	Bitter Sweet	Sarah Millick and Sari Lind	
1934	The Queen's Affair	Queen Nadia	
1934	Nell Gwynn	Nell Gwyn	Neagle's first major hit
1935	Peg of Old Drury	Peg Woffington	
1936	Three Maxims	Pat	Franco-British production
1936	Limelight	Marjorie Kaye	
1937	London Melody	Jacqueline	
1937	Victoria the Great	Queen Victoria	finale filmed in Technicolor
1938	Sixty Glorious Years	Queen Victoria	filmed in Technicolor
1939	Nurse Edith Cavell	Edith Cavell	Neagle's first American film
1940	Irene	Irene O'Dare	features one sequence in Technicolor, produced in the U.S.
1940	No, No, Nanette	Nanette	U.S. production
1941	Sunny	Sunny O'Sullivan	U.S. production
1942	They Flew Alone	Amy Johnson	
1943	Forever and a Day	Susan Trenchard	U.S. production
1943	Yellow Canary	Sally Maitland	
1944	The Volunteer	herself, leaving Denham Studio	
1945	I Live in Grosvenor Square	Lady Patricia Fairfax	
1946	Piccadilly Incident	Diana Fraser	
1947	The Courtneys of Curzon Street	Katherine O'Halloran	
1948	Spring in Park Lane	Judy Howard	
1948	Elizabeth of Ladymead	Elizabeth	filmed in Technicolor
1949	Maytime in Mayfair	Eileen Grahame	filmed in Technicolor
1950	Odette	Odette Sansom	
1951	The Lady with a Lamp	Florence Nightingale	
1952	Derby Day	Lady Helen Forbes	
1954	Lilacs in the Spring	Carole Beaumont / Lillian Grey / Nell Gwynne / Queen Victoria	filmed in Eastmancolor with a black-and-white prologue
1955	King's Rhapsody	Marta Karillos	filmed in CinemaScope and Eastmancolor
1956	My Teenage Daughter	Valerie Carr	
1957	No Time for Tears	Matron Eleanor Hammond	directed by Cyril Frankel, filmed in Eastmancolor
1958	The Man Who Wouldn't Talk	Mary Randall, Q.C.	
1959	The Lady Is a Square	Frances Baring	

== Recordings ==
- "What More Can I Ask?", with orchestra conducted by Ray Noble

His Master's Voice B 4365 (matrix: 0B 4586-3)
Recorded London, 4 January 1933

- "The Dream Is Over", with orchestra conducted by Ray Noble

His Master's Voice B 4365 (matrix: 4587-4)
Recorded London, 4 January 1933

- "Tonight", duet with Trefor Jones with Geraldo and his Orchestra

Columbia (England) DB 1316 (matrix: CA 14314-1)
Recorded London, 30 January 1934

- "Kiss Me Goodnight"

Decca (England) F 5649 (matrix: TB 1869)
Recorded London, 9 August 1935

- "A Little Dash of Dublin"

Decca (England) F 5649 (matrix: TB 1870)
Recorded London, 9 August 1935

- "The Glorious Days" (medley)

Philips Records (England) P.B.153
Recorded 1953

== Box office popularity ==
Annual polls of British exhibitors for the Motion Picture Herald consistently listed Neagle as a leading box office star in her home country.

- 1936 – 14th-most popular British star
- 1937 – 8th-most popular British star
- 1938 – 8th-most popular British star
- 1939 – 5th-most popular British star
- 1940 – 10th-most popular British star
- 1941 – 7th-most popular British star
- 1942 – most popular female British star
- 1944 – 9th-most popular British star
- 1945 – 8th most popular British star
- 1946 – 5th-most popular British star
- 1947 – 3rd-most popular star (2nd most popular British star)
- 1948 – most popular British star (2nd overall)
- 1949 – most popular star – the first time since the polls started that the most popular star in Britain was British
- 1950 – 3rd-most popular star – third year in a row as most popular British star
- 1951 – 6th-most popular star (2nd most popular British star)
- 1952 – 8th-most popular British star – 6th year in a row as most popular female British star

== Publications ==
- There's Always Tomorrow – Autobiography – 1974, ISBN 0-491-01941-6.
