= Douglas Watson =

Doug, Douglass or Douglas Watson may refer to:

- Douglas Chalmers Watson (1870–1946), Scottish physician and writer
- Douglass Watson (1921–1989), American actor on Another World, a/k/a Douglas Watson
- Doug Watson (bowls) (1943–2005), South African international lawn bowler
- Doug Watson (cricketer) (born 1973), South African batsman and coach
