= Otho Stuart =

British actor-manager (1863–1930)

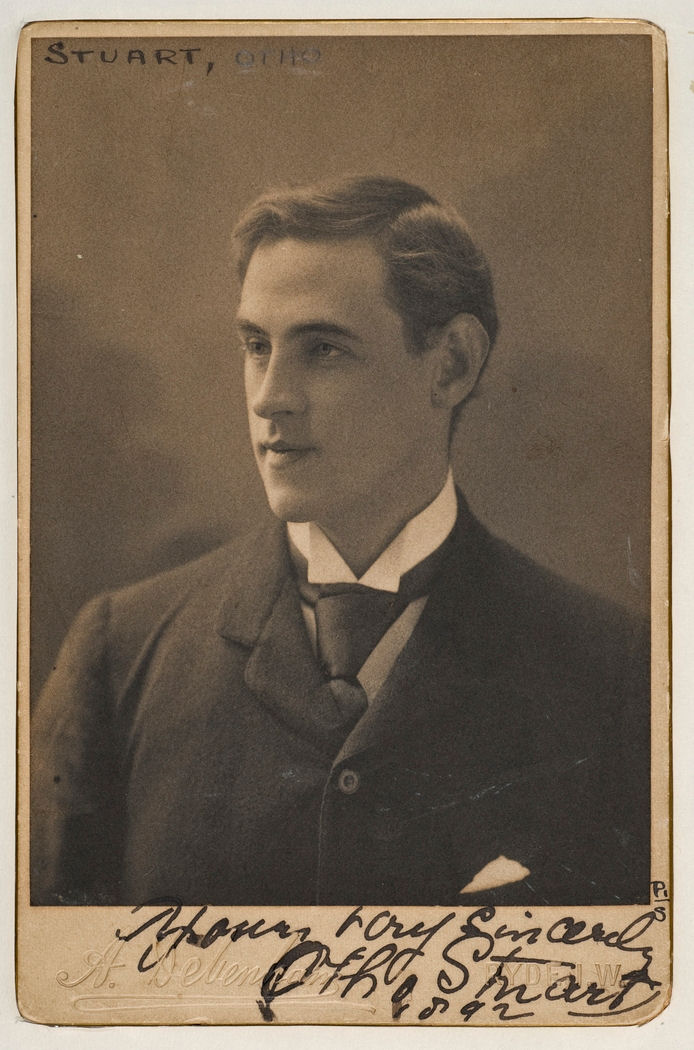
- Otho Stuart in 1892
- Born: 9 August 1863; Battersea, UK
- Died: 1 May 1930 (aged 66)
- Occupation: Actor

Otho Stuart (9 August 1863 – 1 May 1930) was a British actor of the late 19th and early 20th centuries who specialised in performing in the plays of Shakespeare. Stuart played the range of Shakespearean leading men, both with the Company of F. R. Benson and with his own Company during his management of the Adelphi Theatre in London. Of independent means, he used his own money to help finance Benson's productions and his own. The theatre critic J. C. Trewin described him as 'one of the handsomest Oberons of all time.'

== Early career ==
He was born as Otto Stuart Andreae in 1863 in Battersea, the youngest of six children born to Emelia née Sillem (1825–1899) and John Charles Andreae (1819–1892), a German-born naturalised British subject who was a Commissioner Merchant in Indigo. In 1881 Stuart was employed as a commercial clerk and made his professional stage début in 1886 in F. R. Benson's first season at the Shakespeare Memorial Theatre in Stratford-upon-Avon. In April 1886 he played Francisco in Hamlet, Julio in Othello, Messenger in Richard III, and in May 1886 the Surgeon in The Corsican Brothers.

== Theatrical career ==
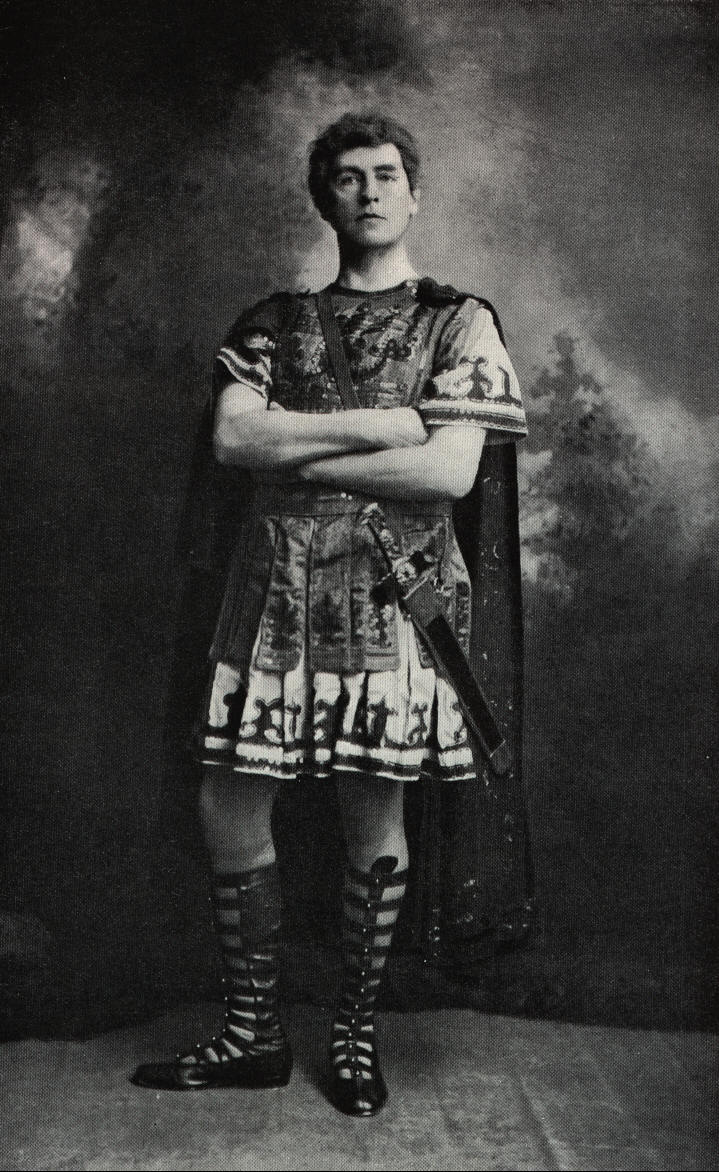
Otho Stuart as Brutus in Julius Caesar (1915)

In Benson's 1888 season at Stratford-upon-Avon he played Morello opposite Ada Ferrar in Andrea; Oberon in A Midsummer Night's Dream; Horatio in Hamlet; Paris in Romeo and Juliet; and was Dashwood in The Belle's Stratagem.

In 1891 he was touring with the Company of F. R. Benson and at the time of the 1891 Census he was staying in the same boarding house with Benson and his wife Constance Benson in Nottingham. In the same year he appeared at Benson's season at the Shakespeare Memorial Theatre in Stratford-upon-Avon, playing Horatio in Hamlet, Claudio in Much Ado About Nothing, Bertie Fitzurse in New Men and Old Acres, and Ferdinand in The Tempest. During 1892 Stuart was the leading man for Mrs. Bernard Beere in her Australian tour. In Benson's 1893 Stratford season Stuart was Tullus Aufidius in Coriolanus and Renaud in The Corsican Brothers.

== Actor-manager ==
In 1896 he was touring as actor-manager with his own Otho Stuart Company as Constantine Brancomir in For the Crowd. When in 1901 it looked like the Company of F. R. Benson would fold it was Stuart's managerial acumen that kept it afloat. From 1904 to 1907 with Oscar Asche he co-managed the Adelphi Theatre which became noted for its productions of modern drama and Shakespearean revivals. Their first play was The Prayer of the Sword in which Walter Hampden appeared. Stuart co-produced The Taming of the Shrew with Oscar Asche in 1904. Their production of A Midsummer Night's Dream in 1905 had Asche as Bottom and Roxy Barton as Titania. In 1905 they produced Hamlet with H. B. Irving in the title role, Under Which King? (1905) with Lily Brayton and Measure for Measure (1906) with Asche as Lucentio. The Graphic of November 1906 wrote, 'Mr. Otho Stuart's management at the Adelphi has for long been distinguished by his bold policy of encouraging the poetic drama. At a time when every other theatre in London has shrunk from producing blank-verse plays he has boldly come forward and produced piece after piece of this character, and this, too, in a beautiful and tasteful manner. As a result, his theatre from being a home of melodrama, has come to be the home of blank-verse plays. His latest venture, produced last week with every sign of success, is the work of a new and young playwright, namely, Mr. Rudolf Besier. It is called The Virgin Goddess and is a Greek tragedy written on the lines used by the Greek dramatists...' The drama starred Oscar Asche and Lily Brayton. Stuart directed Turtle Doves at Wyndham's Theatre in 1906.

When the lease at the Adelphi Theatre came to an end in 1907 Stuart became manager of the Royal Court Theatre in London. Here he had an unexpected failure and needing another play quickly he accepted Lady Frederick by Somerset Maugham, then virtually an unknown writer. Maugham later wrote, '... Otho Stuart, who was a famous [theatrical] manager in his day, had run into difficulties with a play at the Royal Court Theatre, Sloane Square, and he wanted a replacement so that the theatre shouldn't be dark. Aleister Crowley, one of my disreputable friends, introduced me to him... If Lady Federick had failed, I'd made up my mind that I would give up writing.' Lady Frederick was a success for Stuart and for Maugham. The drama was first at the Court Theatre on 26 October 1907, with Ethel Irving as Lady Frederick. It transferred to the Garrick Theatre, the Criterion Theatre, the New Theatre and the Haymarket Theatre; it ran for 422 performances.

Stuart returned to F. R. Benson for his later seasons at Stratford, playing Dr. Burton in The Peacemaker opposite Lilian Braithwaite (1907), and the Duke of Clarence in Richard III (1909 and 1910); He was Edward Stacy Spells in Through the Post at the Royal Court Theatre (1910).

For Benson at Stratford Stuart played Bassanio and Gratiano in The Merchant of Venice (1910 and 1911); Valentine in You Never Can Tell (1912); and Young Marlow in She Stoops to Conquer (1912). He was Johannes in The Sixth Commandment at the Haymarket Theatre (1912), and one of the Thirty Handsome Young Lords in The "Mind the Gates" Girl at His Majesty's Theatre (1912).

In F. R. Benson's 1915-16 Stratford season Stuart was Menenius Agrippa in Coriolanus (1915), Horatio in Hamlet (1915), Chorus in Henry V (1915 and 1916), Marcus Brutus in Julius Caesar (1915), Duke of Clarence in Richard III (1915), Mercutio in Romeo and Juliet (1915), and Feste in Twelfth Night (1915). In Stratford's Tercentenary Commemoration of Shakespeare he played Feste in Twelfth Night and Brutus in Julius Caesar. He appeared in H. B. Irving's production of Hamlet at the Savoy Theatre (1916–17) in a cast that also included Henry Baynton. He was Lord Lushington in Kultur at Home at the Strand Theatre (1916) and Bernard of Treviso in a matinee performance of The Elixir at the Vaudeville Theatre (1918). He was Prince Sergius Abreskov in Reparation at the St. James's Theatre (1919) opposite Claude Rains and Baron Revendal in The Melting Pot at the Savoy Theatre (1920).

In 1898 he married the actress Emma Marion South (1867-1927) in London. Their daughter was Elizabeth Mary Emma Andreae (1903-1993).

Stuart was a Governmentor of the Shakespeare Memorial Theatre in Stratford-upon-Avon.

In his later years he lived at 14 The Boltons, South Kensington. He died in London in 1930 and left an estate valued at £26,905 14s.
