= Chu Chin Chow =

Musical comedy by Oscar Asche and Frederic Norton

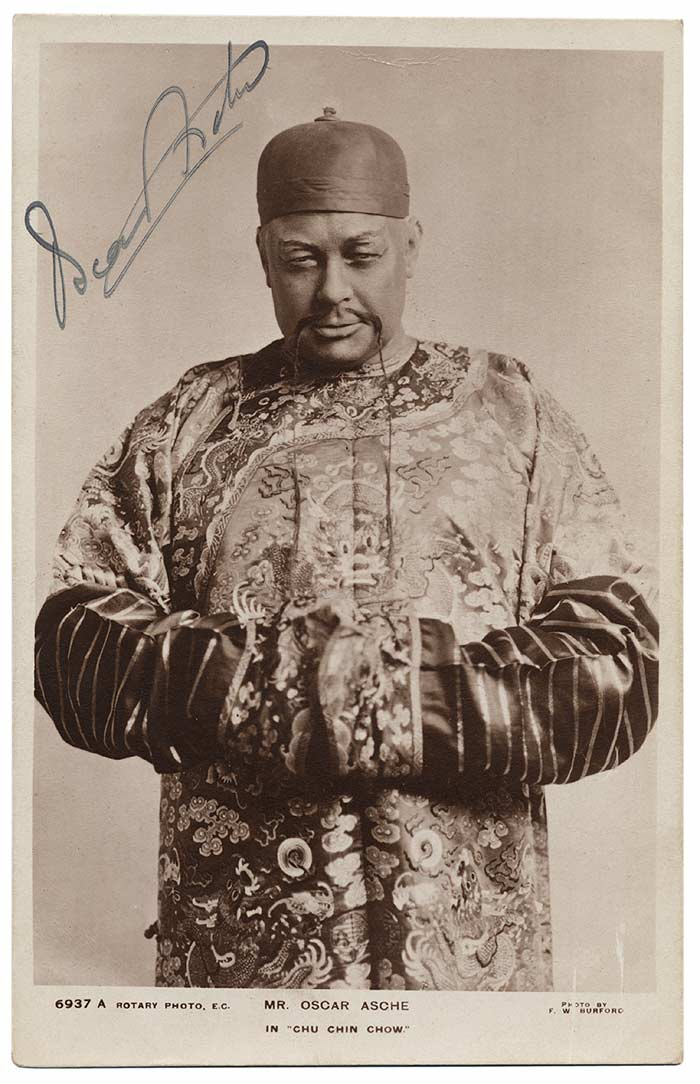
- Oscar Asche in Chu Chin Chow
- Music: Frederic Norton
- Book: Oscar Asche
- Basis: Ali Baba and the 40 Thieves
- Productions: 1916 West End; 1917 Broadway; 1940/1941 West End revival

Chu Chin Chow is a musical comedy written, produced and directed by Oscar Asche, with music by Frederic Norton, based (with minor embellishments) on the story of Ali Baba and the 40 Thieves. The piece premièred at His Majesty's Theatre in London on 3 August 1916 and ran for five years and a total of 2,238 performances (more than twice as many as any previous musical), a record that stood for nearly forty years until Salad Days. The show's first American production in New York, with additional lyrics by Arthur Anderson, played for 208 performances in 1917–1918, starring Tyrone Power. It subsequently had successful seasons elsewhere in America and Australia, including in 1919, 1920, 1921 and 1922.

A silent film of the musical, starring Betty Blythe, was produced in 1923 using some of the music. A talking film, with the score intact, was made by the Gainsborough Studios in 1934, with George Robey as Ali Baba, Fritz Kortner as Abu Hasan, Anna May Wong as Zahrat Al-Kulub, Frank Cochrane reprising his stage role of the cobbler, and Laurence Hanray as Kasim. The show toured the British provinces for many years. It returned to London in 1940 and 1941. In 1953, an ice version was produced at the Empire Pool in Wembley, London, starring Tyrone Power, which also toured the provinces and abroad. Occasional productions are still mounted, including one in July 2008 by the Finborough Theatre in London, England.

== Background ==
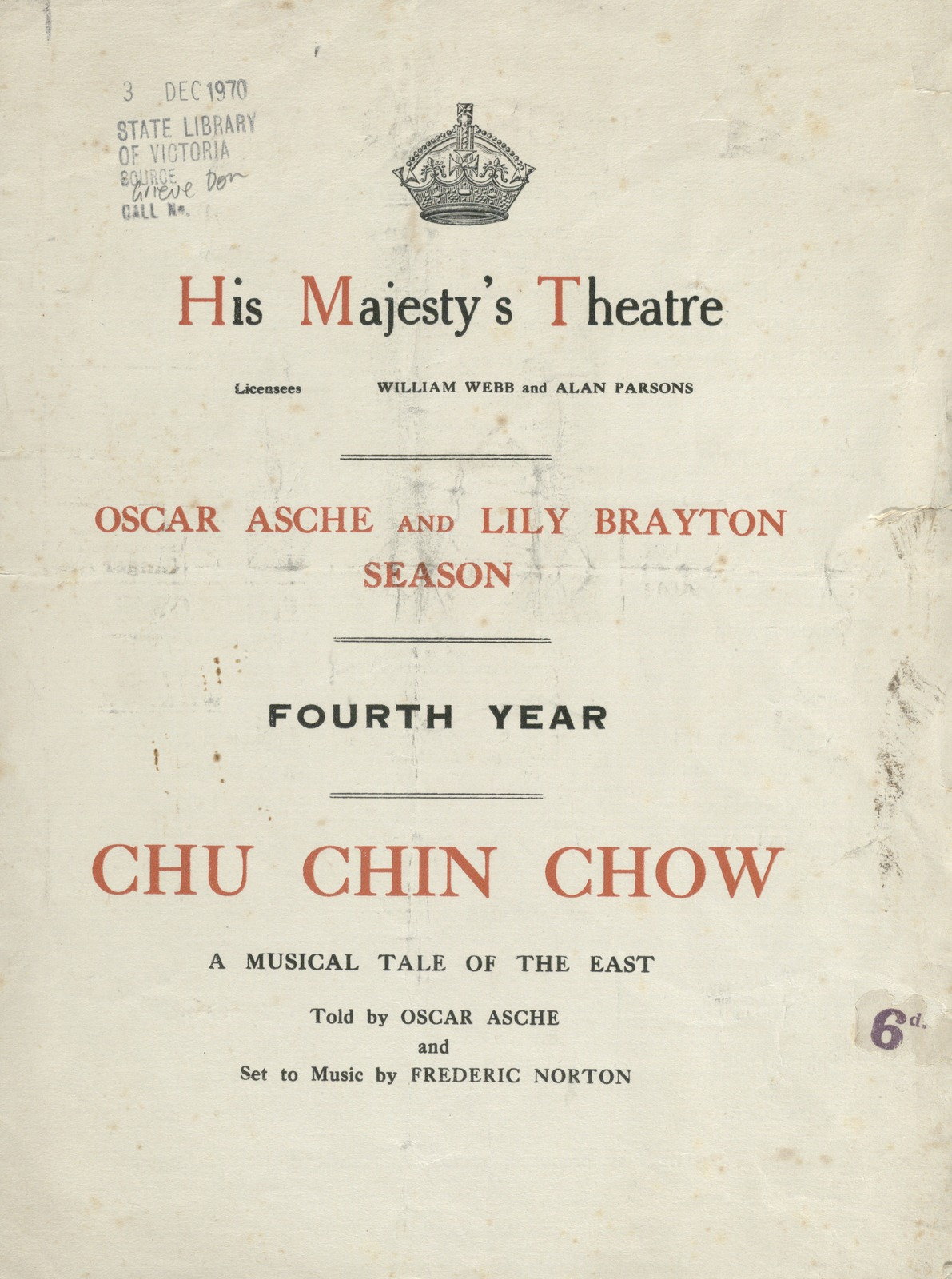
Chu Chin Chow Theatre programme (State Library Victoria)

The success of the "Arabian Nights" adaptation Kismet, a 1911 play by Edward Knoblock, inspired Oscar Asche to write and produce Chu Chin Chow. Asche directed the musical and played the lead role of Abu Hasan, leader of the forty thieves (the "Chu Chin Chow" of the title refers to the robber chief when impersonating one of his victims). Besides Asche, the production starred his wife, Lily Brayton, and the former D'Oyly Carte Opera Company star Courtice Pounds. Costumes were by the designer Percy Anderson.

Chu Chin Chow was described as a combination of musical comedy and pantomime. It was a big budget spectacular costing £5,300, with over a dozen scene changes, fantastic sets, big dance routines, exotic costumes and Asche's innovative lighting designs. The design for the show was influenced by the English taste for all things connected with Asia (known as "orientalism") which had originated with Diaghilev's production of the ballet Scheherazade. Theatre journal The Era said that Norton's music had "a touch of the East but for the most part it was on a level with the tender melody of musical comedy" and "hardly inspired". Nevertheless, many of the songs became hits, and "The Cobbler's Song" and "Any Time's Kissing Time" in particular entered the repertoire of ballad singers for at least three or four decades.

Tickets to see Chu Chin Chow were particularly eagerly sought by troops on leave from the Western Front. One of the attractions for the on-leave soldiers was the chorus of pretty slave girls who, for the period, were very scantily dressed. Complaints, not by the soldiers, resulted in the Lord Chamberlain (the British theatre censor) viewing the show and requiring "this naughtiness" to be stopped—at least for a while. The cast was large and included a camel, a donkey, poultry and snakes. 2.8 million tickets to the show were issued. The year following the premiere of the musical, a souvenir booklet was prepared, which included a novelized version of the play by Willam A. Page. He included additional background explanations to explain the scenery and physical attributes of the characters.

Chu Chin Chow was one of three hit musical shows premiered on the London musical stage during World War I (the others being The Bing Boys Are Here and The Maid of the Mountains), and music or scenes from these have been included as background in many films set in this period. Other popular musicals of the period were Theodore & Co (1916), The Happy Day (1916), The Boy (1917) and Yes, Uncle! (1917). Audiences wanted light and uplifting entertainment during the war, and all these shows delivered it.

== Synopsis ==
Setting: Baghdad, Palace of Kasim Baba

The wealthy merchant Kasim Baba (brother of Ali Baba) is preparing to give a lavish banquet at his home for a wealthy Chinese merchant, Chu Chin Chow, who is on his way from China. The robber chieftain, Abu Hasan, wishes to add to his riches the property of Kasim. Abu Hasan forces his captive, the beautiful Zahrat al-Kulub, to spy for him in Kasim's house, disguised as a slave girl, by holding her lover hostage. She is nearly found out several times. Zahrat sends a message to Abu Hasan, letting him know about the banquet. Hasan arrives at Kasim's palace in disguise as Chu Chin Chow, whom his gang has robbed and murdered. He tries to glean information that will enable him to rob his host.

Meanwhile, the slaves tell Ali Baba, Kasim's poor, lazy brother, about Hasan's secret cave and the password "open sesame". Ali Baba enters the lair and helps himself to some of the thieves' treasure. The greedy Kasim persuades his brother to tell him where his sudden wealth came from and slips out to see what he can find at Hasan's cave. Kasim finds the treasure but is captured by Abu Hasan and put to death. Hasan and his forty thieves plan an attack on Baba household on the occasion of the wedding of Ali Baba's son Nur al-Huda Ali and the slave girl Marjanah.

Finally, on the eve of the attack, Zahrat gets her revenge by disposing of Hasan's men using boiling oil, stabbing Abu Hasan to death, and generally saving the day. Zahrat and her lover are reunited, Ali Baba gets Kasim's widow, Alcolom, and all ends happily.

== Original cast ==
Costume designs shown in the Tatler, 1917

== Roles ==
Role	Premiere cast, 3 August 1916	Original Broadway cast, 22 October 1917
Abu Hasan	Oscar Asche	Tyrone Power Sr.
Kasim Baba/Cobbler	Frank Cochrane	Albert Howson
Ali Baba	Courtice Pounds	Henry Dixey
Nur al-Huda Ali	J. V. Bryant	George Rasely
Abdullah	Norman Williams	Francis J. Boyle
Marjanah	Violet Essex	Tessa Kosta
Zahrat al-Kulub	Lily Brayton	Florence Reed
Alcolom	Aileen D'Orme	Kate Condon
Mahbubah	Sydney Fairbrother	Lucy Beaumont

== Songs ==
All with words by Oscar Asche and music by Frederic Norton unless otherwise indicated.

Act 1

- Here Be Oysters Stewed in Honey (Abdullah and Chorus)
- I am Chu Chin Chow (Abu Hasan and Chorus)
- Cleopatra's Nile (Marjanah and Chorus)
- I'll Sing and Dance (Ali Baba and Company)
- Corraline (Nur-al-Huda and Marjanah)
- When a Pullet Is Plump (Ali Baba)
- We Are the Robbers of the Woods (Robber's Chorus)
- All My Days Till End of Life (Marjanah and Ali Baba)
- Temperamental Am I (Ali Baba, Marjanah and Nur)
- Behold (Abdullah)
- Desert Song (Zahrat and Chorus) – words and music by Frederic Norton.

Act 2

- I Long for the Sun (Alcolom and Chorus) – music by Grace Torrens
- Mahbubah (Ali, Kassim, Marjanah, Nur and Alcolom)
- I Built a Fairy Palace (Mahbubah)
- The Song of the Scimitar (Abu Hasan and Chorus)
- Any Time's Kissing Time (Alcolom)
- The Cobbler's Song (Baba Mustafa)
- We Bring Ye Fruits (Fruit Girls)
- From Cairo, Baghdad, Khorasan (Otbah)
- How Dear Is Our Day (Alcolom and Ali Baba)
- Olive Oil (Abdullah and Chorus)
- Wedding Procession (Ensemble)

Additional Songs added during the original run

- At Siesta Time (Marjanah and Chorus) – words by Arthur Anderson, music by Grace Torrens
- Naughty Knave (Ali Baba) – words by Oscar Asche, music by Grace Torrens (1917)

Additional Songs added in the 1940 revival

- I Shiver and Shake with Fear (Ali Baba, Marjanah and Nur-Al-Huda)
- Beans, Beans, Beans (Mabudah)
- If I Liken Thy Shape (Marjanah and Nur-al-Huda)

== Production history ==
Major productions included the following:

- His Majesty's Theatre 1916–1921 (2,238 performances)
- Broadway 1917–1918 (208 performances)
- Australia 1920–1921
- Regent Theatre, London 1928–1929
- London revival, 1940–1941 (238 performances; 80 in 1940, when it was interrupted by the London bombing, resuming in 1941 for another 158)
- 1953 London and New York ice rink productions
- The Finborough Theatre in London performed a semi-staged, score-in-hand production of Chu Chin Chow in July 2008, starring Alan Cox.

== Recordings ==
- Label: Broadcast Twelve UK 5039. Issued 1929 10" 'Selection From "Chu Chin Chow" (Parts I & 2)

== In popular culture ==
In the novel Auntie Mame (and the play and film versions), the lead character, Mame Dennis, mentions several times that she adored her time as a chorus girl in Chu Chin Chow with her bosom buddy Vera Charles and tries to recreate the experience. The name of American comic book character Fin Fang Foom was inspired by the title of Chu Chin Chow, according to creator Stan Lee, who had seen the 1934 film version as a boy.
