= Roxy Barton =

Australian actress

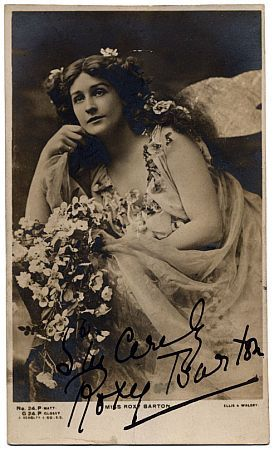
Roxy Barton as Titania in A Midsummer Night's Dream (1905)

Roxy Barton (8 May 1879 – 1 March 1962) was an Australian actress who also had a theatrical career in London and the U.S.

She was born in Sydney in Australia in 1879 as Roxy Claudia May Barton, daughter of Jane McCulloch née Davie (1833-1927) and Russell Barton (1830-1916). The youngest of eleven children, she grew up in the family's palatial Russell-Lea home in Five Dock. The area is now the suburb of Russell Lea.

She commenced her stage career in her native Australia with the Willoughby-Geach Company, appearing in Robbery Under Arms (1898), Man to Man (1899) and Othello (1899), all at the Criterion Theatre in Sydney; The Power and the Glory (1899) at the Lyceum Theatre, Sydney; Tom, Dick and Harry and A Highland Legacy (1901) at the Palace Theatre, Sydney; and in A Stranger in a Strange Land [1904) at the Princess Theatre, Melbourne.

During November 1900, Roxy gained a place in the cast of Message From Mars, a London company production preparing to tour Australia. It was here that she first met her future husband – English actor Harry Stephenson Garraway, whose stage name was Henry Stephenson. The pair performed in Message From Mars and other productions in Sydney, Brisbane, Adelaide and Melbourne, and regional centres such as Charters Towers, Rockhampton and Bendigo. Henry played the part of the Messenger, and he was “a man of such remarkable height that he seemed a veritable ‘Martian’ on the stage. At some stage after his August appearance at the Melbourne's Bijou Theatre, Henry travelled to New York to make his Broadway debut with A Message from Mars. It wasn't until after Roxy relocated to England in 1904, three years later, that the couple met again.

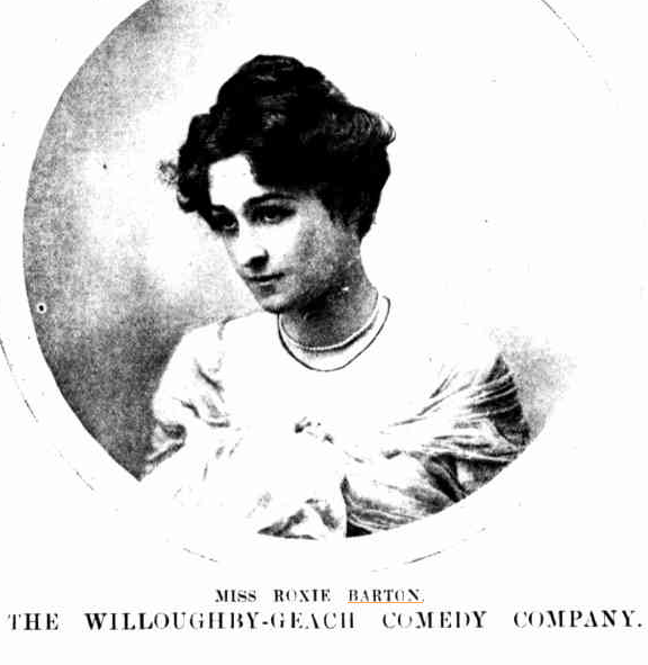
Roxy Barton c.1902

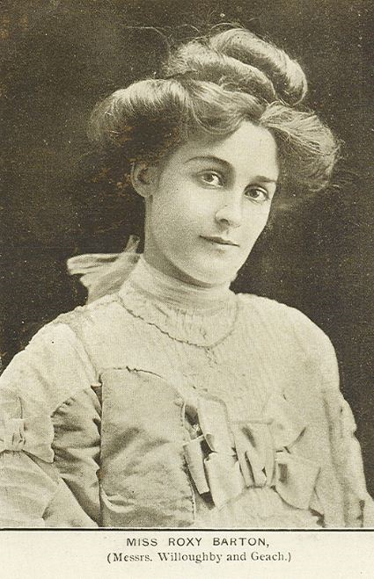
Roxy Barton c.1902

Roxy Barton, the charmer of the Willoughby Geach Co., on whom Willoughby was a bit mashed, but Roxy was cold, and would not encourage him beyond receiving a bit of jewellery at his hands occasionally, has stepped from an extreme of dramatic art in Australia to the highest class in London, from farce to Shakespeare. She has got the billet of leading lady in F. R. Benson’s Shakespeare Co...

Roxy left for England aboard the R.M.S. Macedonia on 25 June 1904 in order to pursue a theatrical career. She played the Queen in Hamlet in one of Mr Benson's small companies in Ireland, where she also appeared as Rosalind. Later, she was promoted to a London play in which Mr Benson also appeared, and she was favourably reviewed during the annual season at the Coronet Theatre London. There she played Athena in The Oresteia Trilogy of Aeschylus, and Mr. Cyril Knightly was Apollo. Roxy was also an understudy to Mrs. Benson, Frank's wife, who was also an actress, and she took the leading parts in the Benson North Company in The Comedy of Errors (1904–1905) at the Adelphi Theatre, and as Athena in The Oresteia Trilogy at the Coronet Theatre in Notting Hill (1905). Next she played Titania in Otho Stuart's production of A Midsummer Night's Dream at the Adelphi Theatre (1905) opposite Oscar Asche as Bottom . Barton was also

School for Scandal and The Rivals, and also appeared as Portia, Rosalind, etc., in the tour, that extended from December 1904 to the end of February 1905. Mid-1905, Roxy performed at Stratford-on-Avon in a leading role in the Shakespearean season Mr. Benson gave in that town.

By July 1905, Roxy had been with the Benson Shakespearean Company almost since her arrival in England, and was still on the same salary list as Mrs. Benson's under-study for leading parts; however, she was not obliged to travel until wanted, so she enjoyed a brief holiday in London. As a visitor, the impressions of the Australian actress of what she saw and the people she met in London were recorded in an Australian newspaper of the time.

Miss Barton is much dazzled by the beauty and gaiety of the London parks, with their summer foliage and luxurious equipages. At the theatres she has seen Mr. Lewis Waller and Miss Evelyn Millard in "Romeo and Juliet" without being particularly impressed. "What Pamela Wanted" was not a success, yet it was well acted, and Miss Ethel Irving was charming. The only emotional actresses in London who touched the visitor were Miss Lena Ashwell and Miss Wynn Mathison, both described as first-rate. Miss Ashwell and Mr. Charles Warner made the success of "Leah Kleschna." A great deal that the visitor saw struck her as ''most ordinary." But she surrenders to Henry Irving. Miss Barton was present at the first night of "Becket" at Drury-lane Theatre, and thought the great actor beyond expectation, "a wonderful man, who made everyone on the stage seem as nothing. The public just stood up when he came on, and howled with joy until they couldn't howl any longer.

By August, Roxy was playing with Mr. F. R Benson's Shakespearean company in London at the Adelphi. Then, Caleb Porter was announced to appear as Egeus, and Roxy as Titania in Otto Stuart's presentation of A Midsummer Night's Dream, also at the London Adelphi on Saturday, November 25. Also starring Oscar Asche as Bottom and Beatrice Ferrar as Puck, this role continued into 1906, followed by the role of Helen in Paris and Aenome in April 1906 at the Savoy Theatre.

Miss Roxy Barton, the Sydney girl who played in Melbourne first in Mr. Hawtrey's ''Messenger from Mars" Company, and afterwards played leads with Geach and Willoughby's Comedy Company, will make her debut in one of London's leading combinations shortly. She is to play "Titania" in a new production of "A Midsummer Night's Dream," by Mr. Otho Stewart's company, in which Mr. Oscar Ashe, another Australian who has made his mark in England, will play the part of "Bottom." Miss Roxy Barton is described in the London Daily Express as "an Australian of striking beauty."

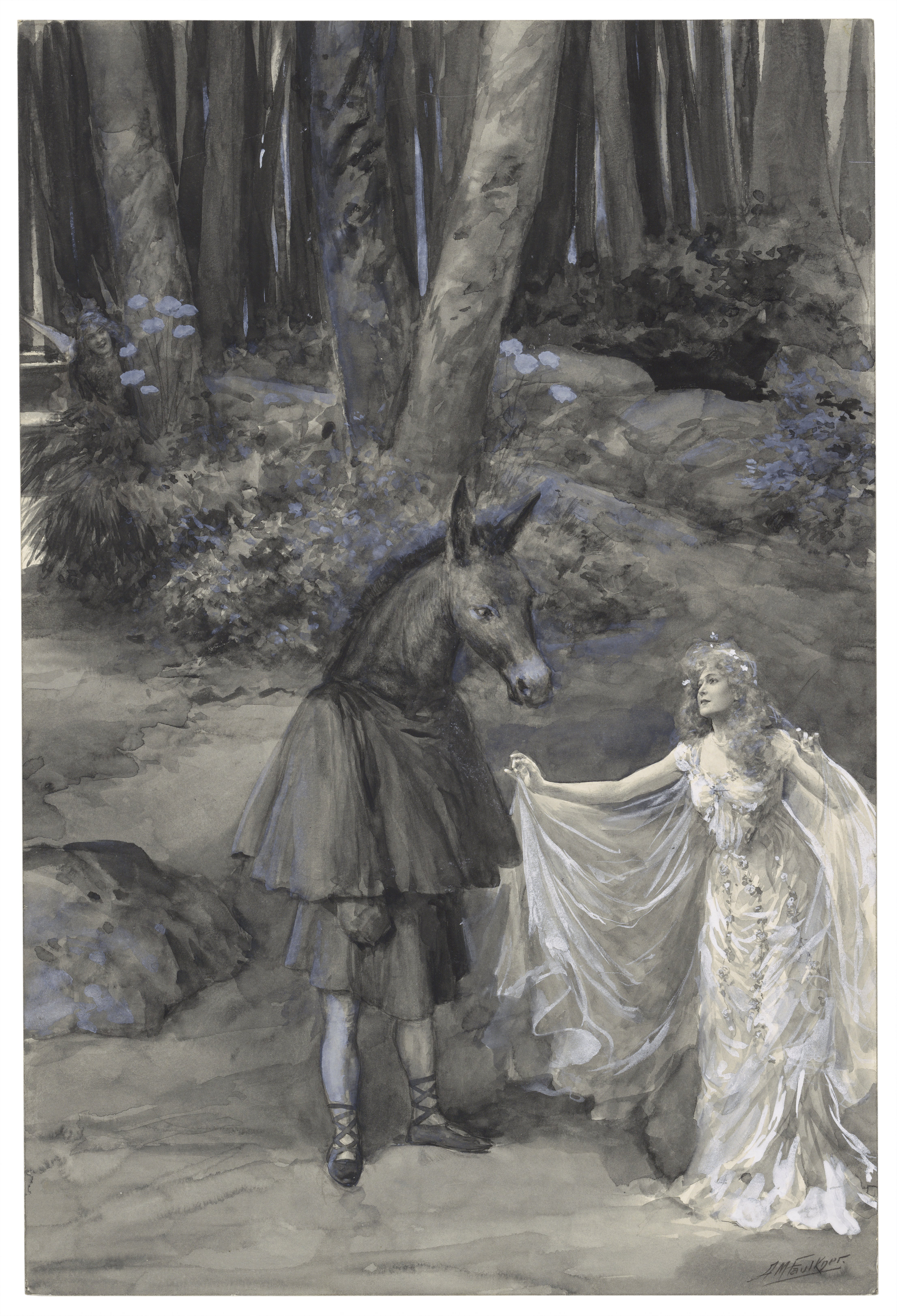
Original artwork of Oscar Asche as Bottom and Roxy Barton as Titania in A Midsummer Night's Dream (1905)

At some point after her arrival in England, Roxy again made contact with Harry Stephenson Garraway (1871-1956 - a.k.a. Henry Stephenson.), her former Messenger from Mars co-star in Australia. They married on 14 July 1906 at St Marylebone Parish Church in London, after which they left for Penzance Cornwall and intended finishing their honeymoon in the Scilly Isles. Still something of a celebrity in her native Sydney, the local press covered the event:

A most interesting wedding, which took place recently in London, was that of Miss Roxy Barton, daughter of Mr. Russell Barton, of Five Dock. You will doubtless remember Miss Barton, a very tall, handsome girl, and a clever actress, who played several seasons in Sydney, notably rather a long one with The Message from Mars Company. It was that self-same messenger whom Miss Barton was married – Mr. Henry Stephenson Garraway, known on the stage as Henry Stephenson. Thus they met for the first time, and the engagement has been one of long standing. She is said to have made an extremely handsome bride. Mr. and Mrs. Garraway intend playing for a season in the States, where something good has been offered to them. It will probably be a long time before Mrs. Garraway returns to her native land. When she does she will receive a hearty welcome, as she has a large circle of friends.

Engaged by Messrs Frank Curzon and J. K. Hackett for the principal part in Mr. Hopkinson, (played In London by Miss Annie Hughes) for a 30-week New York season at a large salary, Roxy and her husband, who was also engaged to play with the same company (he had been acting in that same play just prior to their marriage), were aboard the Philadelphia when it set off three months later from England to New York on September 29. Several other English actors and actresses accompanied them, and their fares were paid by Frank Curzon. According to the shipping record, Roxy was 5’ 6” in height, with fair complexion, brown hair and grey eyes. Henry was 6’ 1” tall, with fair complexion, brown hair and blue eyes.

By November 1907, the couple had returned to London, where Roxy appeared with Mr. Weedon Grossmith in The Night of the Party at the Kennington Theatre, London. In 1908 she played the leading role in The Blackmailers, by Mrs. T. P. O’Connor and Mr. R. Henderson-Bland, which was played for the first time at the County Theatre, Kingston, on October 19. Then in November that same year, she was cast in The New Governess, a production which had its initial hearing at Malvern, England. Mr. Herbert Ross, who was so popular in Australia in A Message From Mars was head of the company. In May 1909, Roxy appeared at the Marlborough Theatre, and at the King's Theatre in Hammersmith. The following month she toured in An English Man's Home, playing the part of Maggie Brown.

Roxy and Henry returned to the U.S. at some point before 1911 and their daughter, the actress Jean Harriet Stephenson (1911–2004), was born there. In 1912 Roxy was a member of the Lydia Gilmore cast. By this time she was using Roxane Barton as her professional name. The 1915 U.S. Census reveals the couple was living at 300 Central Park West. Roxy gave her name as Roxane and her profession as actress. Henry was an actor and their daughter, Jean, was four years old. Also living with them was Ethel May, an English servant aged 30.

Her marriage to Henry Stephenson was dissolved some time before 1922, when he remarried. In 1923, listed as a housewife, Roxy and her daughter Jean sailed to Sydney in Australia on board the Euripides. In 1939 she was living in St George's Road in Stratford-upon-Avon. In 1948, still as a 'Housewife' she made a visit alone to Sydney in Australia aboard the P&O ship Strathaird. After her divorce from Henry, Roxy never remarried, although she seems to have led the life of an international roamer, travelling regularly between New York, London and Australia. In her later years she lived with her daughter and family at 79 Heol Isaf, Radyr, near Cardiff in Wales. Roxy was listed as a 'widow' when she died at the Plymouth Nursing Home in Penarth in Glamorgan, Wales on 1 March 1962. In her will she left £421 3s.
