= Eugene Cowles =

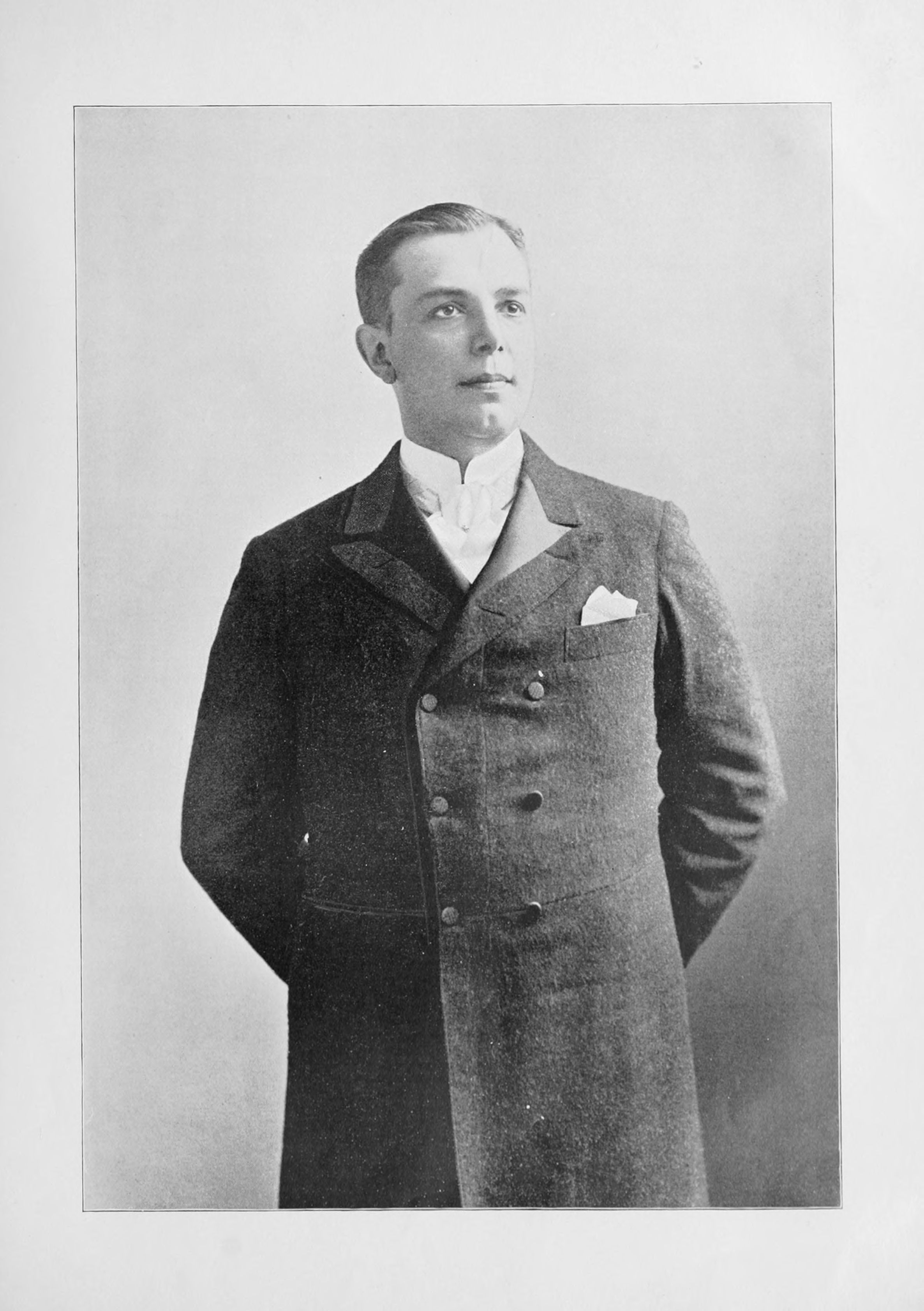
- circa 1890–1900

Background information
- Born: January 17, 1860; Stanstead Plain, Quebec, Canada
- Died: September 22, 1948 (aged 88); Boston, Massachusetts, U.S.
- Genres: Operetta
- Occupation(s): Singer-songwriter, record producer
- Years active: 1898–1921
- Labels: Berliner; Victor; Columbia

Eugene Cowles (January 17, 1860 – September 22, 1948) was a Canadian operetta singer and actor. He began recording in 1898 and continued through 1921.

He is most commonly associated with the ballad "Forgotten" which was recorded by a variety of artists in the first decade of the 20th century. Composed by Cowles himself, his original 1906 recording of the song for Victor stayed in print for over two decades. He created the role of Sándor in The Fortune Teller in 1898.

== Honors ==
His 1898 recording of Victor Herbert's "Gypsy Love Song" was added to the National Recording Registry in 2004.
