= Henry Stephenson =

British actor (1871–1956)

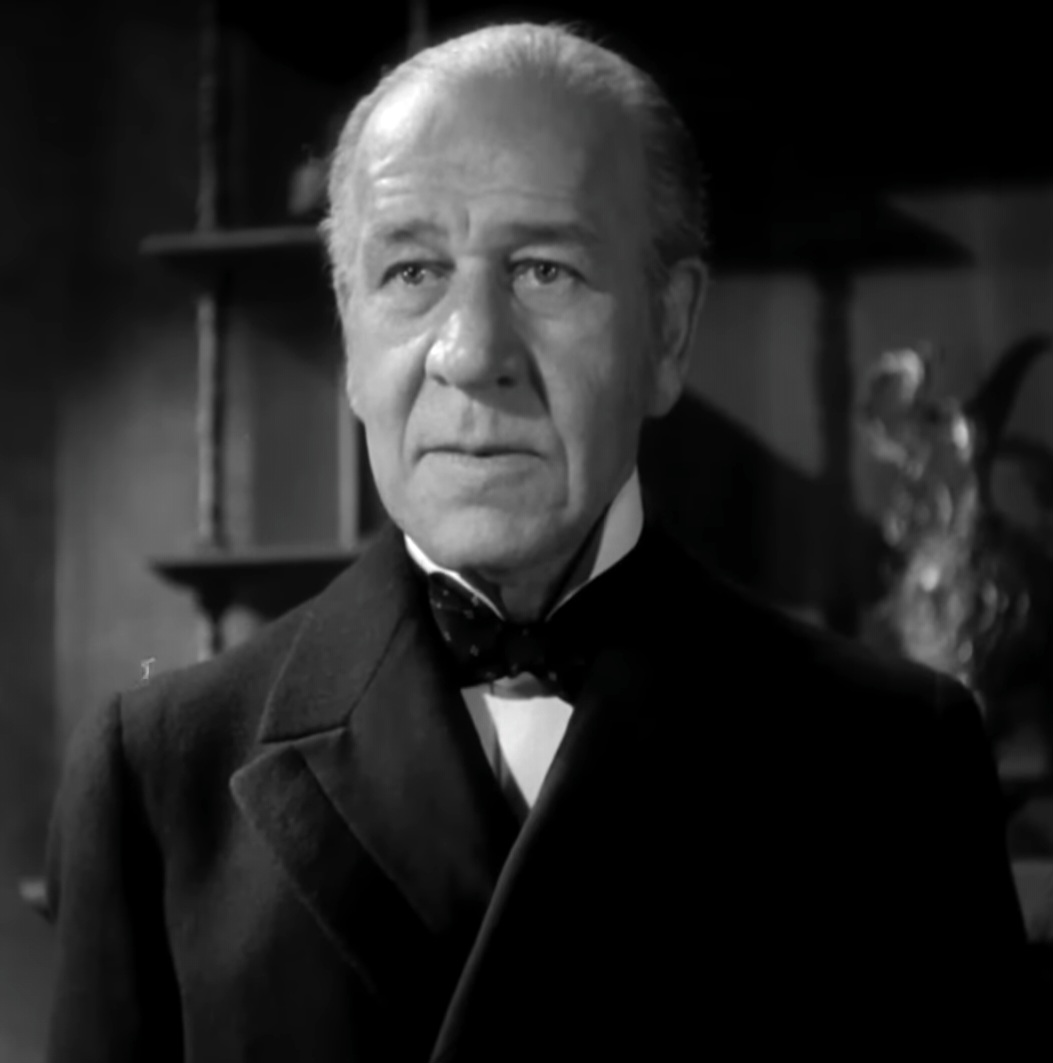
- Stephenson in Little Lord Fauntleroy (1936)
- Born: Harry Stephenson Garraway; 16 April 1871; Grenada, British West Indies
- Died: 24 April 1956 (aged 85); San Francisco, California, U.S.
- Occupation: Actor
- Years active: 1901–1952
- Spouses: Roxy Barton (m. 1906, dissolved) Ann Shoemaker (m. 1922)
- Children: 1

Harry Stephenson Garraway (16 April 1871 – 24 April 1956) was a British actor. He generally portrayed amiable and wise gentlemen in many films of the 1930s and 1940s. Among his roles were Sir Joseph Banks in Mutiny on the Bounty (1935) and Mr. Brownlow in Oliver Twist (1948).

== Life and career ==
Stephenson was born to British parents in Grenada, British West Indies, and educated in England. He started acting in his twenties. He appeared on British and American stages and made his Broadway debut in 1901, playing the messenger in A Message from Mars starring Charles Hawtrey. In the following decades, he performed in more than 30 Broadway plays.

Stephenson made his film debut in 1917 and appeared in a few silent films, but made his mark mostly as an elderly man in sound films. Between 1931 and 1932, he appeared in the Broadway play Cynara with over 200 performances. He came to Hollywood for the film version of Cynara, starring Ronald Colman and with Stephenson reprising his role of John Tring. In the same year, he played the tycoon C.B. Gaerste in Red-Headed Woman, Leslie Howard's father Rufus Collier in The Animal Kingdom and Doctor Alliot in A Bill of Divorcement. In 1933, he appeared as Mr. Laurence in Little Women. He specialized in portraying wise, dignified and congenial British gentlemen in supporting roles.

Stephenson appeared in 90 films from 1917 to 1951. He often played historical figures like Sir Joseph Banks in the Oscar-winning adventure film Mutiny on the Bounty (1935) and Florimond Claude, Comte de Mercy-Argenteau in Marie Antoinette (1938).

Stephenson worked with film star Errol Flynn in the films Captain Blood, The Charge of the Light Brigade, The Prince and the Pauper, and The Private Lives of Elizabeth and Essex, often as Flynn's paternal friend and superior. He portrayed Sir Thomas Lancing in Tarzan Finds a Son! in 1939, and Sir Guy Henderson in Tarzan and the Amazons in 1945.

Stephenson seldom played dark figures; among the exceptions was the snobbish Mr. Bryant in Mr. Lucky in 1943. He also appeared in several literary adaptions, for example as the friendly lawyer Havisham in Little Lord Fauntleroy (1936) and as Mr. Brownlow in David Lean's film adaptation of Oliver Twist (1948). He made his last film in 1949, but appeared in two television series in 1951 before the end of his career. In 1950, after completing his role of Cardinal Gaspar de Quiroga in the play That Lady, Stephenson retired from the stage.

== Personal life ==
He married the Australian-born actress Roxy Barton on 14 June 1906 at St Marylebone Parish Church in Marylebone in London. Their daughter was the actress Jean Harriet Stephenson. The marriage was later dissolved. He later wed the actress Ann Shoemaker, who had a daughter, Anne Hall, the song lyricist, by a previous marriage. Henry Stephenson died in 1956, aged 85 from nephritis.

== Filmography ==
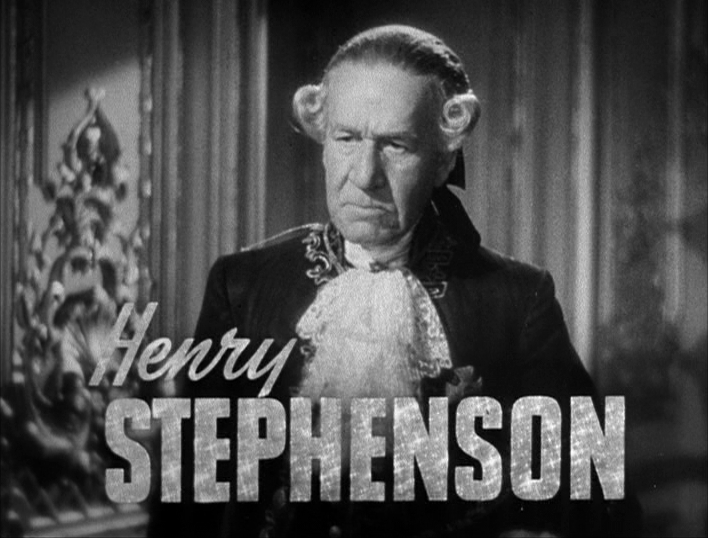
Henry Stephenson in Marie Antoinette (1938)

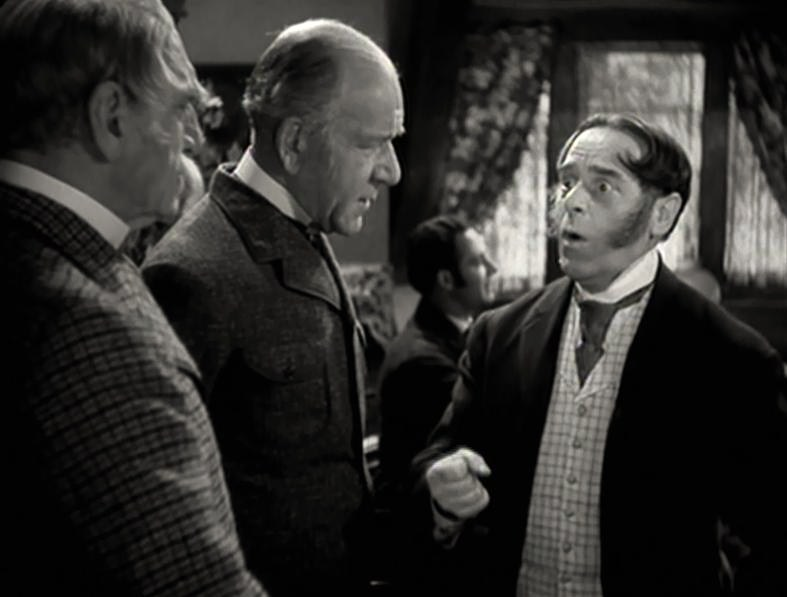
Henry Stephenson (middle) in Little Lord Fauntleroy (1936); with C. Aubrey Smith (left) and Walter Kingsford (right)

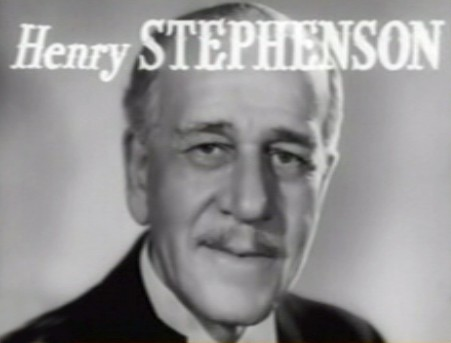
in the trailer for Little Women (1933)

- The Spreading Dawn (1917) as Mr. LeRoy (film debut)
- A Society Exile (1919) as Sir Howard Furnival
- The Tower of Jewels (1920) as David Parrish
- The Black Panther's Cub (1921) as Clive, Earl of Maudsley
- Men and Women (1925) as Arnold Kirke
- Wild, Wild Susan (1925) as Peter Van Dusen
- Red-Headed Woman (1932) as Gaerste
- Guilty as Hell (1932) as Dr. Ernest S. Tindal
- A Bill of Divorcement (1932) as Dr. Alliot
- The Animal Kingdom (1932) as Mr. Rufus Collier
- Cynara (1932) as John Tring
- Tomorrow at Seven (1933) as Thornton Drake
- Double Harness (1933) as Colonel Sam Colby
- Blind Adventure (1933) as Maj. Archer Thorne
- My Lips Betray (1933) as De Conti
- Little Women (1933) as Mr. Laurence
- If I Were Free (1933) as Hector Stribling
- Man of Two Worlds (1934) as Sir Basil Pemberton
- The Mystery of Mr. X (1934) as Sir Herbert Frensham
- All Men Are Enemies (1934) as Scrope
- Stingaree (1934) as Mr. Hugh Clarkson
- Thirty Day Princess (1934) as King Anatol XII
- One More River (1934) as Sir Laurence Mont
- She Loves Me Not (1934) as Dean Mercer
- The Richest Girl in the World (1934) as Connors
- Outcast Lady (1934) as Sir Maurice
- What Every Woman Knows (1934) as Charles Venables
- The Night Is Young (1935) as Emperor Franz Josef
- Vanessa: Her Love Story (1935) as Barney Newmark
- Reckless (1935) as Col. Harrison
- The Flame Within (1935) as Dr. Jock Frazier
- O'Shaughnessy's Boy (1935) as Major Winslow
- Rendezvous (1935) as Ambassador
- Mutiny on the Bounty (1935) as Sir Joseph Banks
- The Perfect Gentleman (1935) as Bishop
- Captain Blood (1935) as Lord Willoughby
- Little Lord Fauntleroy (1936) as Havisham
- Half Angel (1936) as Professor Jerome Hargraves
- Hearts Divided (1936) as Chas. Patterson
- Walking on Air (1936) as Mr. Horace Bennett
- Give Me Your Heart (1936) as Edward - Lord Farrington
- The Charge of the Light Brigade (1936) as Sir Charles Macefield
- Beloved Enemy (1936) as Lord Athleigh
- When You're in Love (1937) as Walter Mitchell
- The Prince and the Pauper (1937) as the Duke of Norfolk
- The Emperor's Candlesticks (1937) as Prince Johann
- Conquest (1937) as Count Anastas Walewski
- Wise Girl (1937) as Mr. Fletcher
- The Baroness and the Butler (1938) as Count Albert Sandor
- The Young in Heart (1938) as Mr. Anstruther
- Marie Antoinette (1938) as Count de Mercey
- Suez (1938) as Count Mathieu de Lesseps
- Dramatic School (1938) as Pasquel Sr.
- Tarzan Finds a Son! (1939) as Sir Thomas Lancing
- The Adventures of Sherlock Holmes (1939) as Sir Ronald Ramsgate
- The Private Lives of Elizabeth and Essex (1939) as Lord Burghley
- Little Old New York (1940) as Chancellor Robert L. Livingstone
- It's a Date (1940) as Capt. Andrew
- Spring Parade (1940) as Emperor Franz Joseph
- Down Argentine Way (1940) as Don Diego Quintana
- The Man Who Lost Himself (1941) as Frederick Collins
- Lady from Louisiana (1941) as General Anatole Mirbeau
- Rings on Her Fingers (1942) as Colonel Harry Prentiss
- This Above All (1942) as General Cathaway
- Halfway to Shanghai (1942) as Colonel Algernon Blimpton
- The Mantrap (1943) as Sir Humphrey Quilp
- Mr. Lucky (1943) as Mr. Bryant
- Two Girls and a Sailor (1944) as John Dyckman Brown I
- The Hour Before the Dawn (1944) as Gen. Hetherton
- Secrets of Scotland Yard (1944) as Sir Reginald Meade
- Reckless Age (1944) as J. H. Wadsworth
- Tarzan and the Amazons (1945) as Sir Guy Henderson
- The Green Years (1946) as Prof. Rattray Blakely
- Heartbeat (1946) as Minister
- Night and Day (1946) as Omar Cole
- Of Human Bondage (1946) as Dr. Tyrell
- Her Sister's Secret (1946) as Mr. Dubois
- The Return of Monte Cristo (1946) as Prof. Duval
- The Locket (1946) as Lord Wyndham
- Time Out of Mind (1947) as Wellington Drake
- The Homestretch (1947) as Don Humberto Balcares
- Dark Delusion (1947) as Dr. Evans Biddle
- Ivy (1947) as Judge
- Song of Love (1947) as King Albert
- Oliver Twist (1948) as Mr. Brownlow
- Julia Misbehaves (1948) as Lord Pennystone
- Enchantment (1948) as General Fitzgerald
- Challenge to Lassie (1949) as Sir Charles Loring (final film)
