= Bisham =

Coordinates: 51°33′29″N 0°46′30″W

- Village and civil parish
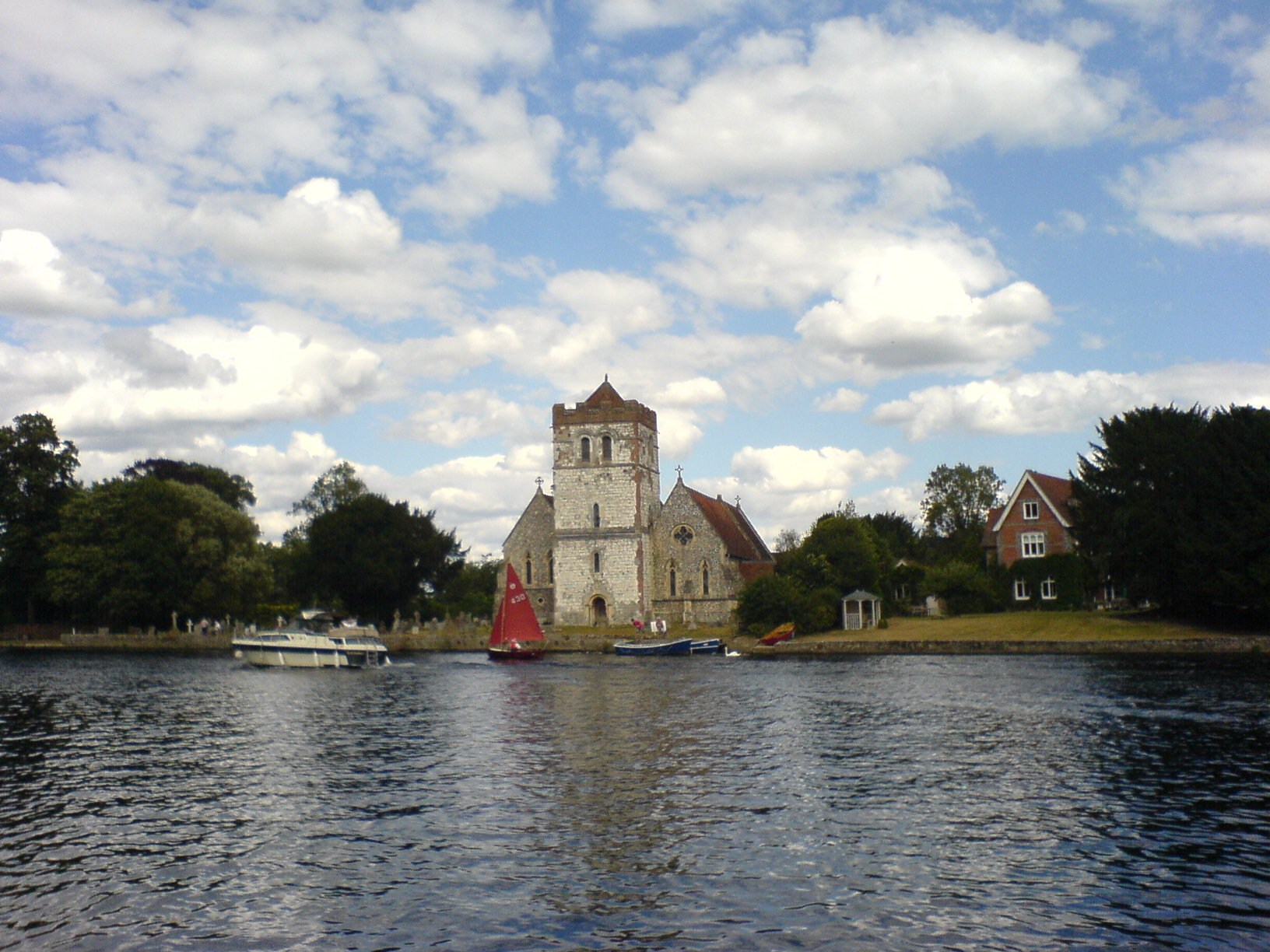
- All Saints Church

- Location within Berkshire
- Population: 1,099 (2011)
- OS grid reference: SU849849
- Civil parish: Bisham
- Unitary authority: Windsor and Maidenhead
- Ceremonial county: Berkshire
- Region: South East
- Country: England
- Sovereign state: United Kingdom
- Post town: MARLOW
- Postcode district: SL7
- Dialling code: 01628
- Police: Thames Valley
- Fire: Royal Berkshire
- Ambulance: South Central
- UK Parliament: Maidenhead

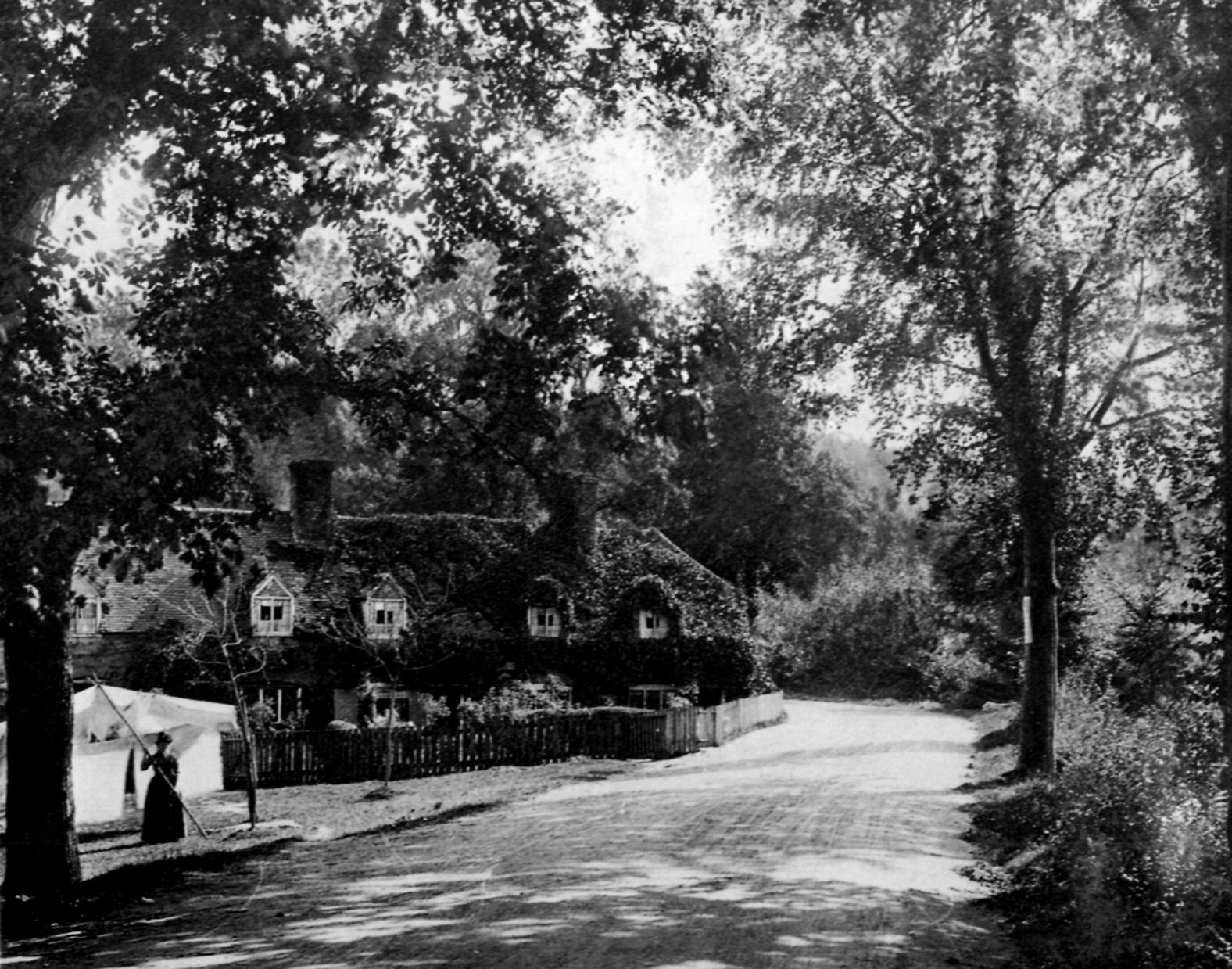
Bisham, Berkshire (period 1850-98) by Francis Frith

Bisham /ˈbɪsəm/ is a village and civil parish in the Royal Borough of Windsor and Maidenhead in Berkshire, England. The village is on the River Thames, around one mile (1.6 km) south of Marlow in the neighbouring county of Buckinghamshire, and around three miles (5 km) northwest of Maidenhead. At the 2011 Census, the population of the parish was 1,099, down from 1,149 at the 2001 Census. Bisham is home to one of Sport England's National Sports Centres.

== Etymology ==
The name has been spelt in various ways since Bistesham in the Domesday Book. It is derived from Bristle and Ham, with Bisham als Bustleham Montague being the first modern spelling with 'Bisham' in 1746.

== Historic buildings ==
The National Sports Centre at Bisham is centred on Bisham Abbey, a 13th-century manor house, originally built for the Knights Templar but later the residence of the Montagu (or Montacute) Earls of Salisbury and the Hoby family.

== Geography ==
Bisham has a local nature reserve on the eastern edge of the village, called Bisham Woods.

There is 'Princess Elizabeth's Spring' in a field called the Moors, which was believed to cure sore eyes in the 19th century.

== In popular culture ==
Bisham Church is mentioned in Jerome K. Jerome's 1889 humorous novel Three Men in a Boat.

The Church and churchyard, as well as the Compleat Angler Hotel, are featured in episodes of the 1990s BBC television detective series, Pie in the Sky. During the Nationwide Building Society's summer advertising campaign of 2010, when they were the official sponsors of the England football team at the World Cup, one of their television advertisements featured the England team playing on one of the pitches at Bisham Abbey. The parish church was clearly visible in the background. Theatrical couple Oscar Asche and Lily Brayton are buried in the graveyard of All Saints Church.

A Ham class, minesweeper HMS Bisham, was named after the village.
