= Peter F. Dailey =

American comedian and singer (1868–1908)

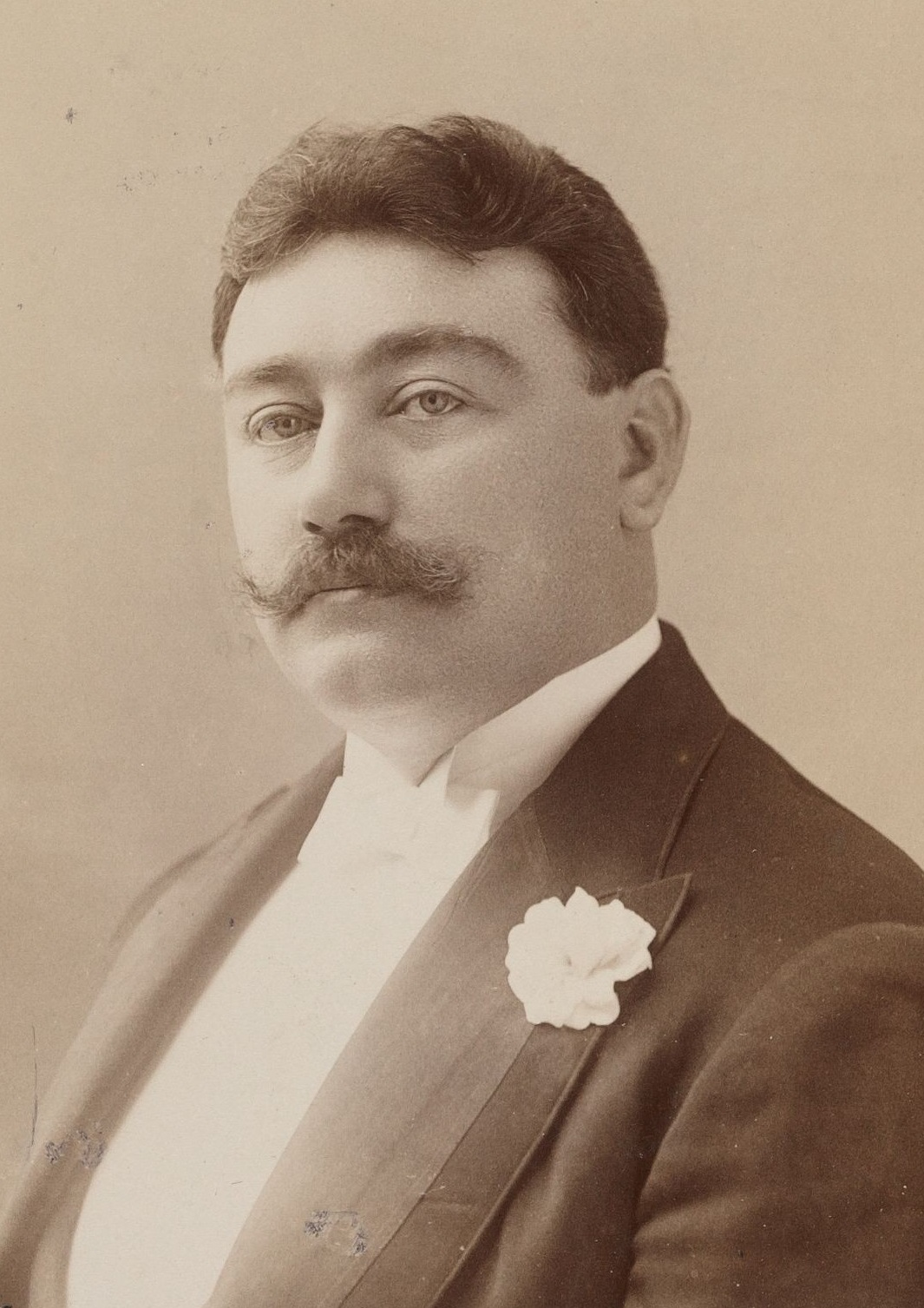
- Born: Peter Francis Dailey; January 5, 1868; Manhattan, New York City, U.S.
- Died: May 23, 1908 (aged 40); Chicago, Illinois, U.S.
- Occupation(s): Burlesque comedian, singer
- Spouse: Mary Hanley Angus (m. 1893–1902)
- Partner: Kate Condon (engaged)

Peter Francis Dailey (January 5, 1868 – May 23, 1908) was an American burlesque comedian and singer who became popular during the era remembered as the Gay Nineties.

== Early life ==
Born in Manhattan, New York City, on January 5, 1868, he was raised in Brooklyn along the banks of the East River. Dailey was the youngest of two sons and a daughter born to New York natives, Owen and Mary Dailey. In later years friends of his father, who was a fishmonger and active in city politics, would say of his son Peter that the apple did not fall far from the tree. By 1880, Dailey and his siblings were being raised by their widowed mother. She supported her family by working as a dressmaker, while William, her sixteen-year-old son helped out as a salesman. Dailey had a much younger brother, Robert L. Dailey (1885–1934), who became a vaudeville player active in the early years of the twentieth century. As a young boy Dailey enjoyed hanging about the docks and piers that populated the banks of the East River at that time, often bantering with the odd assortment of stevedores, sailors, and steamship passengers that would cross his path.

== Career ==
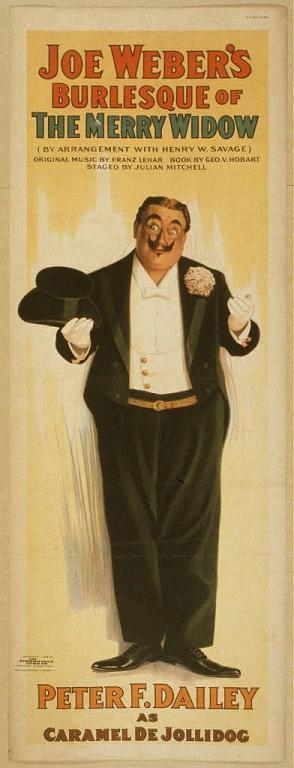
Library of Congress

Peter Dailey took to the stage at the age of eight at the Globe Theatre on Broadway, where they became popular performing the Barn Door Reel, a popular dance of the day. He later joined Whitney's Circus as an acrobat and clown before finding success with a vaudeville troupe called "The American Four", with James F. Hoey, Pete Gale, and Joe Pettingill. After the troupe disbanded, Dailey performed for three years at the Howard Athenaeum in Boston, where for a season he played Le Blanc in the extravaganza Evangeline. His breakout role came in New York in 1892 playing Jack Potsand Poole in A Straight Tip, with James T. Powers.

Over the following seasons Bailey would find success in such farce comedies as A Country Sport by John J. McNally at the Hollis Street Theatre and The Night Clerk with Jennie Yeamans and Raymond Hitchcock. After these engagements Dailey became a regular performer with Weber and Fields in New York. In 1900 he starred with Christie MacDonald in the musical comedy Hodge, Podge and Co, based on Im Himmelhof, a German farce adapted by George V. Hobart and in 1902 with Ada Lewis in Augustus Thomas' Champaign Charley. Dailey would remain in demand, performing in a number of productions over the remainder of the first decade of the new century. His last performance came in 1908 in The Merry Widow Burlesque with May Irwin.

== Death ==
Peter Dailey died in Chicago on May 23, 1908, after a brief struggle with pneumonia. At the time he was starring in The Merry Widow Burlesque, that had just completed its five-month run in New York. Dailey was barely able to finish his opening night performance at Chicago's Colonial Theater and died just a few days later. Dailey is interred at Green-Wood Cemetery in Brooklyn, New York.

He had planned to marry singer Kate Condon, who several years earlier had appeared with him in The Press Agent, at Lew M. Weber's theatre. Condon's husband had disappeared in 1903 and she needed permission from the church to remarry. That spring she traveled to Rome to seek a Papal dispensation to marry Dailey. Her cable informing him that she had been successful arrived just hours after he died.

In his obituary, The Hartford Courant wrote:

Pete Daily was a genial warmhearted man who made friends where ever he went. He was an actor of much originality and really made his own parts as he paid little attention to the lines of the playwright. Introducing his own, and his "gagging" of his parts was as amusing to his stage associates as those in the audience. He was natural comedian as full of life and fun off the stage as on.
