= Tessa Kosta =

American actress

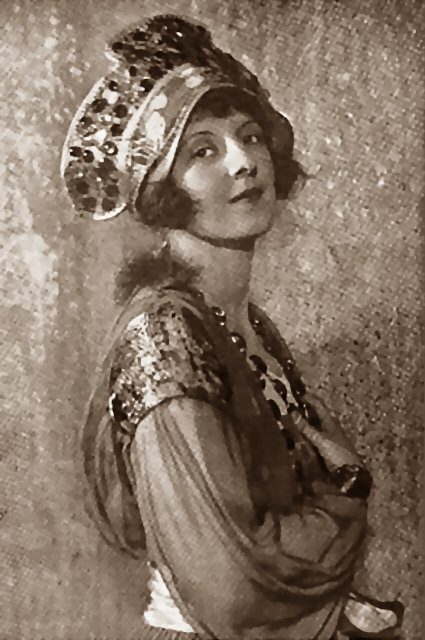
- Kosta in The Theatre Magazine, 1922
- Born: Tessa Kay Kosta; December 12, 1890; Chicago, Illinois, U.S.A.
- Died: August 23, 1981 (aged 90); New York City, U.S.A.
- Occupation: Musical Actress
- Spouse: Richard J. Madden

Tessa Kay Kosta (December 12, 1890 – August 23, 1981) was an American actress who starred in Broadway musicals and operettas during the early decades of the twentieth century.

== Early life and career ==
Kosta was born in Chicago, Illinois, the daughter of Edward and Emma Kosta. Her parents came to America from Hungary the year of her birth, settling first in Chicago and then San Francisco where her father worked as a confectioner. Sometime after the turn of the twentieth century Kosta’s family moved to Ely, Nevada, where she graduated from Ely High School in 1907. Prior to entering college at Salt Lake City, she studied music at the Holy Rosary Academy in San Bernardino, California.

Kosta’s break came in February 1911 when producer George W. Lederer plucked her from the chorus to play the title role Yvonne Sherry in road productions of his hit Broadway musical, Madame Sherry. She stayed with Madame Sherry for over a year to positive reviews before touring in late 1912 as Claudine with the musical comedy The Pink Lady opposite Olga De Baugh and Harry Depp.

== Broadway and later years ==
Her adult Broadway debut came on April 13, 1914, at the Astor Theatre as Anna Budd in the musical comedy The Beauty Shop. Kosta’s Broadway career would span at least fifteen years, with Chu Chin Chow (1917/18), Lassie (1920), The Chocolate Soldier (1921/22), Caroline (1923) and Song of the Flame (1926) among her more memorable productions. She last appeared on Broadway in 1929 at Jolson's 59th Street Theatre playing the multiple roles Musette, Irma and Lieutenant Fedor in The Fortune Teller.

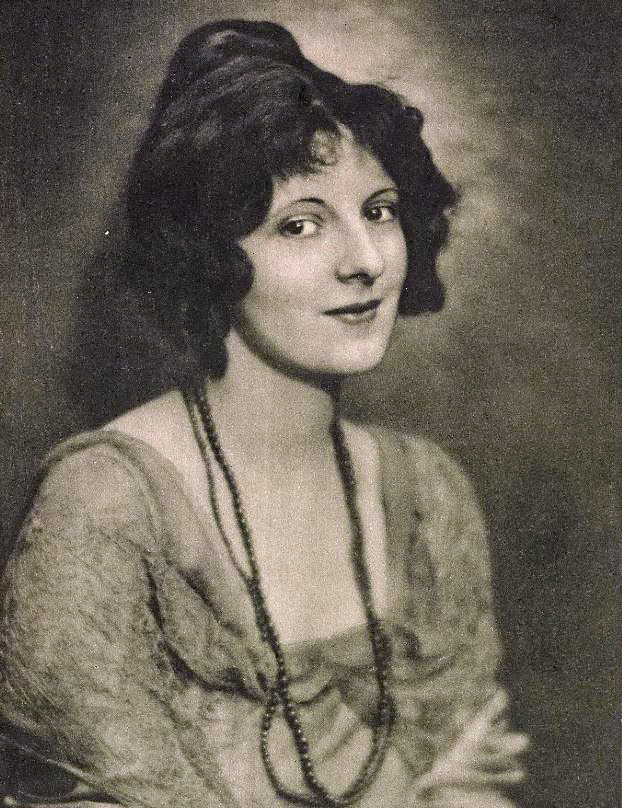
Tessa Kosta, August 1920

Kosta was married to Richard J. Madden, a theatrical agent, and was a member of the board of directors of the Episcopal Actors Guild, the Ziegfeld Girl’s Club and the Twelfth Night Club. She made numerous trips abroad over the decades following her retirement from the stage. Kosta died in Manhattan of a heart attack in 1981 at the age of 90. Her husband had died some years earlier.
