= The Fortune Teller (operetta) =

Operetta by Victor Herbert and Harry B. Smith

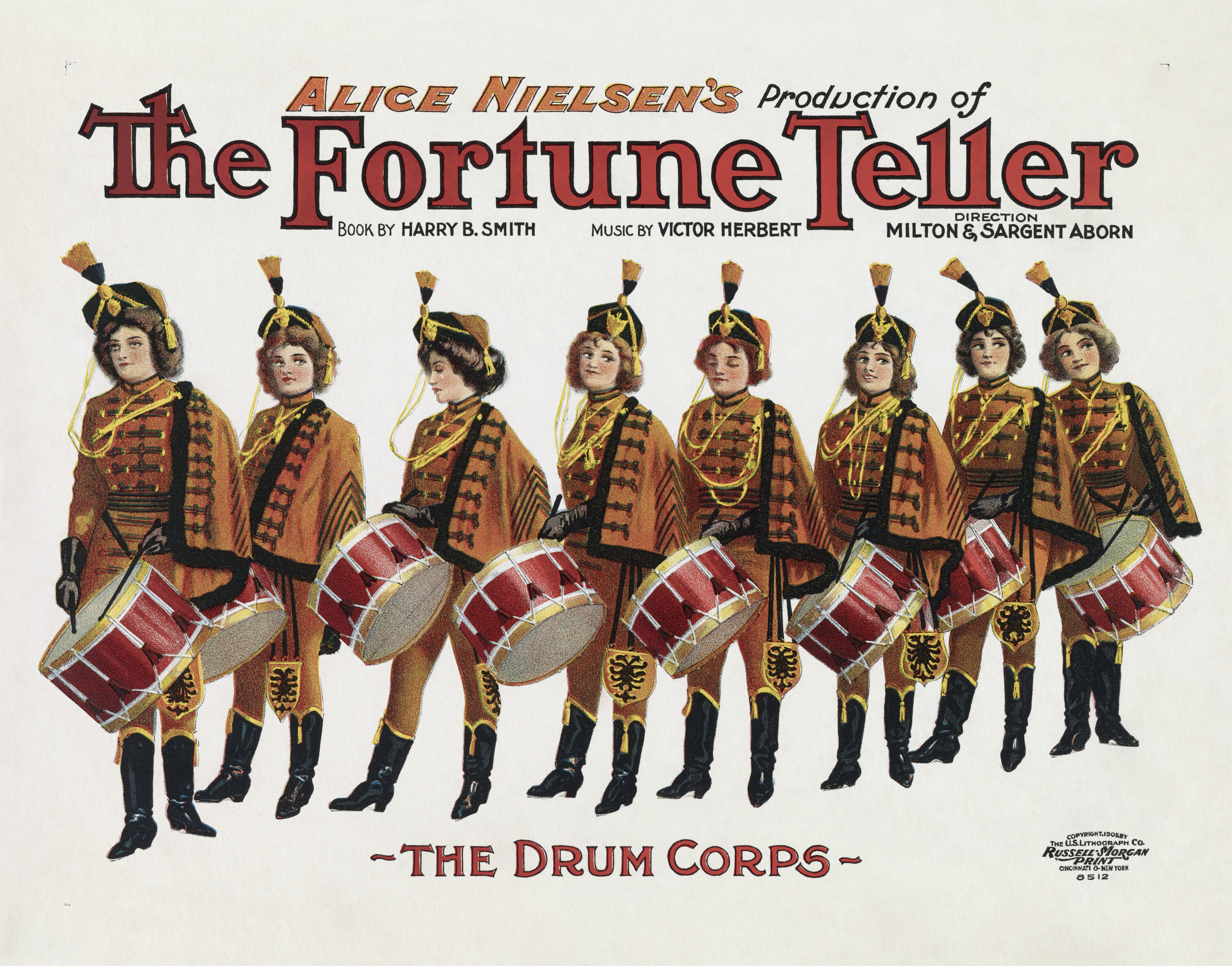
- Music: Victor Herbert
- Lyrics: Harry B. Smith
- Book: Harry B. Smith
- Productions: 1898 Broadway; 1929 Broadway revival

The Fortune Teller is an operetta in three acts composed by Victor Herbert, with a libretto by Harry B. Smith. After a brief tryout in Toronto, it premiered on Broadway on September 26, 1898, at Wallack's Theatre and ran for 40 performances. Star Alice Nielsen and many of the original company traveled to London, where the piece opened at the Shaftesbury Theatre on April 9, 1901, running for 88 performances. It was revived in New York on November 4, 1929, at Jolson's 59th Street Theatre, starring Tessa Kosta, and ran for 16 performances. The piece continued to be revived, including by the Light Opera of Manhattan in the late 20th century and the Comic Opera Guild in the early 21st century.

This was Herbert's sixth operetta, which he wrote for Nielsen and her new Alice Nielsen Opera Company, which included Joseph W. Herbert, Eugene Cowles, Joseph Cawthorn, Richard Golden and Marguerite Sylva. Nielsen, having earned widespread praise in The Serenade, requested and received not one but three roles in The Fortune Teller: Irma, her twin brother Fedor, and Musette, a gypsy fortune teller. Irma, an heiress from Budapest, is studying ballet. She is in love with a young Hussar captain, Ladislas, but is being forced to marry a silly pianist, Count Barezowski. When Musette arrives, she is mistaken for Irma; the case of mistaken identity fosters many complications, but all ends happily.

Songs include "Gypsy Love Song" ("Slumber on, my little gypsy sweetheart") and "Romany Life". Cowles' 1898 recording of "Gypsy Love Song" was added to the National Recording Registry in 2004.

== Synopsis ==
Count Berezowski, a poor Polish composer, discovers that a student in the ballet school at the Budapest Opera will inherit a fortune. He plans to meet and marry her for the money. The School's ballet master, Fresco, wants to split the expected windfall with the Count. They discover that the heiress is Irma, who loves Hussar Captain Ladislas. To avoid marrying the Count, Irma decides to run away. Irma is told that her twin brother, Fedor, has deserted from his regiment to marry a French opera singer, and if he is found, he will be shot for desertion. Irma plans to disguise herself as Fedor, which would have two benefits: she would get out of marrying the Count, and Fedor would not be executed. She flees but leaves Fresco a suicide letter saying that the impending marriage to the Count caused her to take her life.

Some gypsies appear. Their fortune teller, Musette, looks just like Irma, so Fresco purchases her from her father, hoping to fool the Count. The ruse is successful – the Count falls for the fake Irma, and everyone arrives for the wedding. But Musette's boyfriend, Sandor, persuades Musette to run away.

At the Count's chateau, the wedding preparations are proceeding. Meanwhile, Musette has slipped away. Irma appears in her brother Fedor's uniform. Fresco recognizes Irma and begs her to stay. She agrees and puts on the wedding dress. Sandor thinks she is Musette, while Ladislas and the Count believe she is Irma. Irma insists that she is Fedor. Fedor's lover, Mlle Pompom, also arrives and is upset. When word arrives that war has broken out, everyone leaves to fight for Hungary.

Fedor has not yet returned to the Hungarian army, and Irma continues impersonating him. Since Irma has vanished, the Count and Fresco cannot collect her inheritance, which will devolve to Fedor in her absence. Mlle. Pompom claims that "Fedor" has deserted her. It turns out that Fedor has not deserted either the army or his sweetheart but has heroically led a squad on a secret mission that resulted in a critical Hungarian victory. All rejoice, and Irma is free to wed Ladislas, while Musette, Sandor, Fedor, and Mlle Pompom, can marry.

== Roles and original cast ==
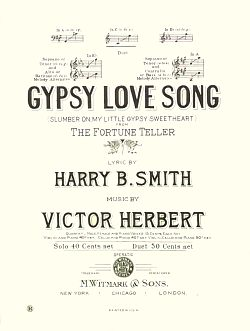
Sheet music

- Musette, a fortune teller* – Alice Nielsen
- Captain Ladislas, a Hussar – Frank Rushworth
- Fresco, a dance master (trouser role) – Richard Golden
- Count Berezowski, a composer of no renown – Joseph W. Herbert
- Irma, a ballet student* – Alice Nielsen
- Mlle Pompon, a fading prima donna – Marguerite Sylva
- Fedor, Irma's twin brother* – Alice Nielsen
- Sandor, a gypsy leader – Eugene Cowles
- Irene, Trina and Ruth, ballet students
- Corporal, a Hussar
- Chorus

The roles marked with an asterisk (*) are all played by the same woman.

== Musical numbers ==
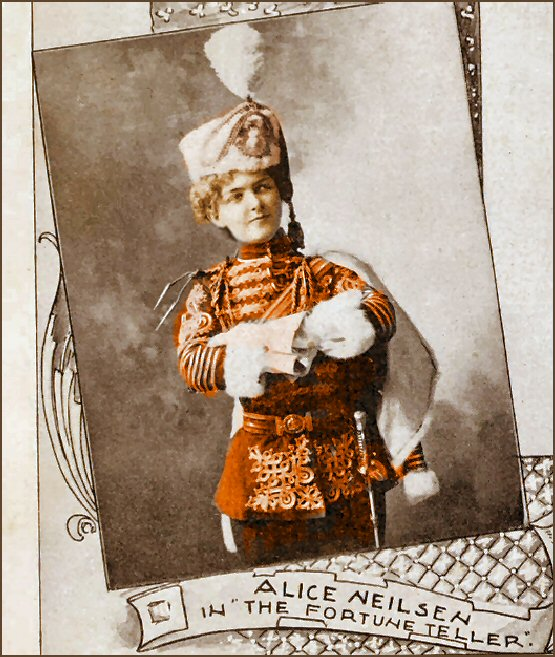
Alice Nielsen as Fedor

Act 1

- Overture
- Introduction and Opening ensemble
- Always Do as People Say You Should – Irma and Ladies Chorus
- Hungaria's Hussars – Captain Ladislas and Hussars
- Ho! Ye Townsmen – Sandor
- Romany Life – Musette, Sandor, Vaninka, Boris, Rafael and Chorus
- Czardas – Musette and Chorus
- Finale I

Act 2

- Opening Chorus
- Signor Monsieur Moldoni – Fresco and Chorus
- The Serenade of All Nations – Musette, Count Berezowski, Fresco, Boris and Mixed Chorus
- Gypsy Love Song (Slumber On, My Little Gypsy Sweetheart) – Sandor, Musette and Chorus
- Only in the Play – Mlle. Pompom and Captain Ladislas
- Finale II

Act 3

- Gypsy Jan – Sandor and Chorus
- The Power of the Human Eye – Boris and Count Berezowski
- The Lily and the Nightingale – Musette
- Finale III
