= Kate Condon =

American opera singer

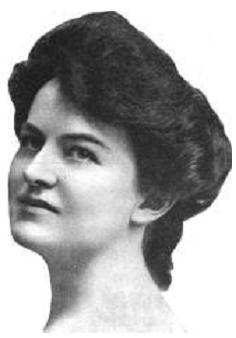
- Circa 1905
- Born: February 4, 1877; Bloomington, Illinois, U.S.
- Died: May 27, 1941 (aged 64); Chicago, Illinois U.S.
- Occupation(s): Singer, actress
- Spouse: Edward Burke Scott
- Partner: Peter F. Dailey (engaged)

Kate Condon (February 4, 1877 – May 27, 1941) was an American contralto who performed in light and grand operas on Broadway and in opera houses over the first two decades of the twentieth century.

== Early life ==
Condon was born in 1877 in Bloomington, Illinois, the second youngest of six children raised by William and Bridget Condon. Some records give her birth date as February 4, 1880, but this is unlikely since her brother Thomas was born in October 1879. Condon's parents both came to America from Ireland in the years leading up to the American Civil War and married in 1859, settling in Bloomington, where in 1860 their first child was born. Her father became a well known Illinois merchant.

== Career ==
Condon's first appearance in a major production on the New York stage came in November 1900, playing Siebel in the English Grand Opera Company's production of Charles Gounod's Faust with the Metropolitan Opera. She had previously been a member of the Castle Square Company in Boston and would later perform on Broadway and elsewhere with such stars as Jefferson De Angelis, De Wolf Hopper, Fritzi Scheff, and Tyrone Power, Sr. Her first role on Broadway was Molly O'Grady in The Emerald Isle in 1902. Among other Broadway appearances, in 1913 she appeared in revivals of two Gilbert and Sullivan operas. Condon crossed the Atlantic during the First World War to entertain troops serving with the American Expeditionary Force in France. In 1917–18, near the end of her career, her last Broadway role was in a successful revival of the musical Chu Chin Chow.

== Marriage ==
On May 16, 1903, Condon married Edward Burke Scott at New Haven, Connecticut. Scott was a theatrical advance man and treasurer for the Frank Daniel's Opera Company, then under the management of Charles Dillingham. In November, just six months after they wed, Scott disappeared while Condon was touring the Midwest and was never seen again. Several thousand dollars had vanished from the opera company's accounts.

Five years later, Condon traveled to Rome to ask for a Papal dispensation releasing her from her marriage to Scott so she could wed comedian Peter F. Dailey. She cabled Bailey on May 23, 1908, to inform him that the Pope had granted their request; she was unaware that the 40-year-old comedian had fallen ill and would not live to see her message delivered.

In September 1926, William B. Victor, a partner in a successful New Orleans real estate firm, committed suicide. Sometime later a relative of her husband's contacted Condon and told her that Victor and Scott might be the same person. This was confirmed when she traveled to New Orleans in February 1927 and identified her husband's remains.

== Death ==
Condon died in 1941, aged 64, at her Chicago residence after struggling with a lingering illness. She was survived by two brothers and a sister.
