= Frederic Norton =

British composer

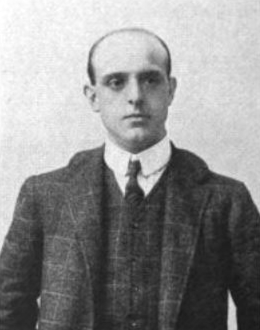
- In The Sketch in 1903
- Born: George Frederic Norton; 11 October 1869; Broughton, Salford, England
- Died: 15 December 1946 (aged 77); Holford, Somerset, England
- Occupation: Composer

George Frederic Norton (11 October 1869 – 15 December 1946) was a British composer, most associated with the record breaking Chu Chin Chow, which opened in 1916.

== Biography ==
Norton was born in Broughton, Salford, England. He studied with Sir Paolo Tosti and appeared on stage in variety theatre. Some of these acts included the delivery of monologues. These led Norton to compose songs, many of them humorous. His published songs included 1908's "Rosemary" with words by Graham Robertson, and "Maid of the Morning", "When a Pullet is Plump" and "The Elephant and the Portmanteau". In turn, these songs resulted in Norton composing music for stage shows, starting with The Water Maidens in 1901.

In 1911, Norton provided additional music for a production of Orpheus in the Underworld at His Majesty's Theatre, which was based on the Offenbach opera of the same name.

In 1916, he wrote the music to Oscar Asche's Chu Chin Chow, which achieved a then world-record theatrical run of over five years.

Norton was never again to achieve the same degree of success that he earned with Chu Chin Chow.

He died in Holford in 1946, aged 77.
