= Lily Brayton =

19th/20th-century English actress and singer

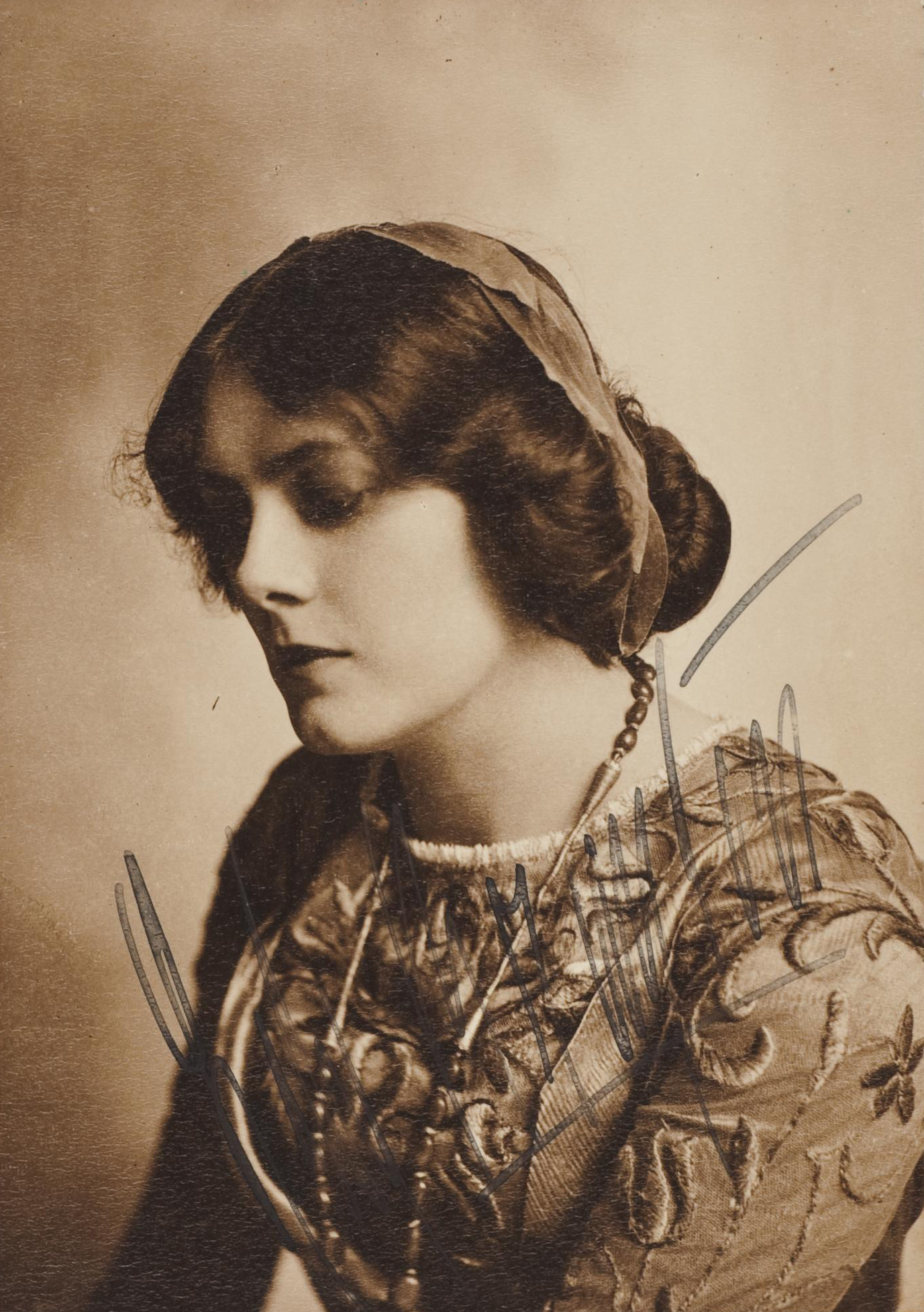
- Lily Brayton, Melbourne, 1909–1910
- Born: Elizabeth Brayton; 23 June 1876; Hindley, Greater Manchester, England
- Died: 30 April 1953 (aged 77); Dawlish, Devon, England
- Occupation: Actress
- Years active: 1896–1932
- Spouses: Oscar Asche (m. 1898; died 1936); Dr. Douglas Chalmers Watson (m. 1936; died 1946)

Elizabeth "Lily" Brayton (23 June 1876 – 30 April 1953) was an English actress and singer, known for her performances in Shakespeare plays and for her nearly 2,000 performances in the First World War hit musical Chu Chin Chow.

== Early life and career ==
Brayton was born in Hindley, Lancashire, the fourth daughter of a Lancashire doctor, John Grindal Brayton (1842–1892). Little is known of her early life. Her first stage performance was in Manchester in 1896, when she was in the cast of a production of Shakespeare's King Richard II. She joined the F. R. Benson company, and in June 1898 she married Oscar Asche, a fellow company member. Her sister Agnes Brayton (1878–1957) was another member of the same company.

In 1900 Brayton was chosen by Herbert Beerbohm Tree to create the part of Mariamne in his production of Herod. In 1904 she and Asche formed their own theatrical company. In 1906 she played Iseult in Joseph Comyns Carr's play Tristram and Iseult at the Adelphi Theatre, with Matheson Lang as Tristram and Asche as King Mark. Her sister Agnes also had a part in this production. In 1907 Lily, as Katherine, and Agnes, as Bianca, appeared in the Oxford University Dramatic Society's production of The Taming of the Shrew with Gervais Rentoul as Petruchio.

In 1907, Brayton became co-manager, with her husband, of His Majesty's Theatre, London, which was owned by Tree, in association with whom they managed a number of Shakespeare and other plays, including Laurence Binyon's Attila, in which she played the part of Ildico.

In 1909–1910, while Brayton and Asche were touring Australia, the Australian musician Wynne Jones composed a piece entitled "The Lily Brayton Valse". In 1911 at the Garrick Theatre, Brayton starred with Asche in the play Kismet. They toured Australia again in 1912–13 and also visited South Africa at the end of the tour in 1913. Several Shakespeare plays were given during these visits, as well as Kismet. In 1914, she appeared as Marsinah in the silent film adaptation of Kismet.

== Chu Chin Chow and later years ==
Brayton as Ildico in Attila

The Asche hit musical comedy Chu Chin Chow was staged in London in 1916. Brayton played the female lead character, Zahrat-al-Kulub. Chu Chin Chow played until 1921, enjoying an unprecedented run of 2,238 performances, of which Brayton performed in nearly 2000, an endurance feat. Brayton did not accompany Asche on his third tour of Australia in 1922–24.

The majority of Brayton's performances, excepting Chu Chin Chow, were in Shakespeare plays. She also performed for several seasons at the Stratford Festival. Her last stage appearance was as Portia in Julius Caesar in 1932, directed by Asche. Asche became unstable and violent in his later years, and he and Brayton separated for a time, although she produced his 1928 play, The Good Old Days of England.

After Asche's death in 1936, Brayton married Dr. Douglas Chalmers Watson and moved to Drem in East Lothian. Following the death of her second husband she moved to Dawlish in Devon where she died at the age of 76. She was cremated and her ashes buried in the grave of her first husband in the riverside cemetery near her former home in Bisham, Berkshire. She had no children.

There are three paintings of Brayton in the National Portrait Gallery, and many photographs exist showing her in costume.

== Selected performances ==
- Herod, as Mariamne (1900)
- Richard II, as Queen Isabella (1900,1903,1910)
- Twelfth Night, as Viola (1901)

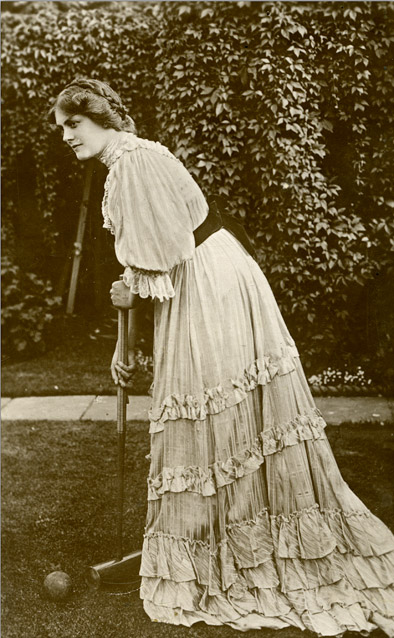
Brayton in 1906

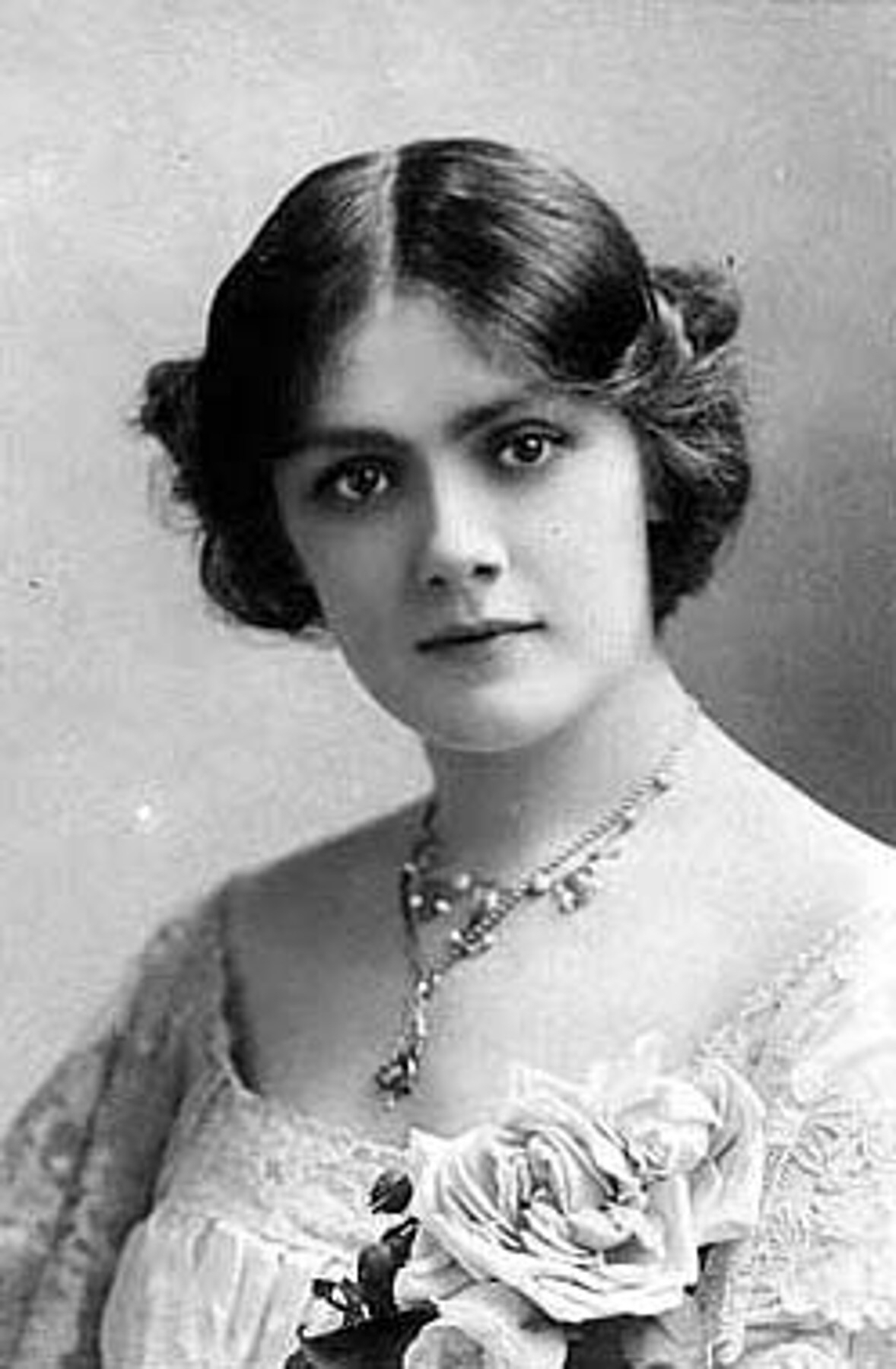
Brayton, c. 1900

- The Prayer of the Sword (James Bernard Fagan), as Ilaria Visconti (1904)
- Darling of the Gods, as Yo-San (1904)
- Taming of the Shrew, as Katherine (1904,1907,1908,1914)
- Hamlet, as Ophelia (1905)
- Measure for Measure, as Isabella (1906)
- The Virgin Goddess (Rudolph Besier), as Althea (1906)
- Tristram & Iseult, as Iseult (1906)
- A Midsummer Night's Dream, as Helena (1906)
- Othello, as Desdemona (1907, 1909)
- Attila, as Ildico (1907)
- The Two Pins (Frank Stayton), as Elsa (1908)
- Merry Wives of Windsor, as Mistress Ford (1911)
- As You Like It, as Rosalind (1911)
- Kismet, as Marsinah (1914)
- Chu Chin Chow, as Zahrat-al-Kulub (1916–1921)
- Julius Caesar, as Portia (1932)
