= Douglas Chalmers Watson =

Scottish physician and writer

- Born: 1870
- Died: 7 April 1946 (aged 75–76); Fenton Barns, Scotland
- Occupation(s): Physician, writer
- Spouses: Mona Geddes (died 1936); Lily Brayton (m. 1938)

Douglas Chalmers Watson (1870 – 7 April 1946) M.D., F.R.C.P.Ed. was a Scottish physician and writer.

== Biography ==
Watson was educated at George Watson's College and the University of Edinburgh. He graduated in 1892 and obtained the Wightman Prize in Clinical Medicine. He was house physician at the Royal Infirmary of Edinburgh and Royal Hospital for Sick Children, Edinburgh. His first wife was Mona Geddes.

He joined the British Medical Association in 1897 and was secretary of the Section of Pharmacology and Therapeutics at the London Annual Meeting in 1916. Watson was the editor of the Encyclopaedia Medica. In 1900, he took his M.D. thesis on the value of bone marrow extract in the treatment of chronic skin diseases. He was elected F.R.C.P.Ed. in 1901 and obtained his M.D. in 1904. He studied nutrition in the laboratories of Sir Edward Albert Sharpey-Schafer.

Watson authored the treatise "The Influence of Variations of Diet on the Tissues and Organs of the Body". He was appointed assistant physician to the Royal Infirmary of Edinburgh in 1907. Watson conducted clinical research and contributed papers on autointoxication and treating gout, rickets, rheumatism and tuberculosis. He founded the Patriotic Food League in 1915 to assist the public with information on the subject of food values and preparation of foods. He authored Food and Feeding in Health and Disease and The Book of Diet.

Watson married a second time, to the actress Lily Brayton, in 1938. He died at Fenton Barns in 1946.

== Food and Feeding in Health and Disease ==
His main work Food and Feeding in Health and Disease was positively reviewed by the medical community. It was described as a "valuable contribution to the literature of dietetics". It contains an appendix with a series of 22 papers by Watson and collaborators, "a record of experimental observations on the influence of diet on the structure of tissues."

== Selected publications ==
- Food and Feeding in Health and Disease: A Manual of Practical Dietetics (1910, 1913)
- The Book of Diet (1913)
- The "Vital" Factor in Diet: A Theory of the Nature of Vitamins (Edinburgh Medical Journal, 1931)
- Radiation in Relation to Human and Animal Nutrition. With a Theory as to the Nature of Vitamins (Journal of the Royal Society of Medicine, 1931)
