= Kismet (play) =

1911 play

Kismet is a three-act play written in 1911 by Edward Knoblauch (who later anglicised his name to Edward Knoblock). The title means Fate or Destiny in Turkish. The play ran for 330 performances in London and later opened in the United States. It was subsequently revived, and the story was later filmed several times and adapted for the 1953 musical.

== History ==
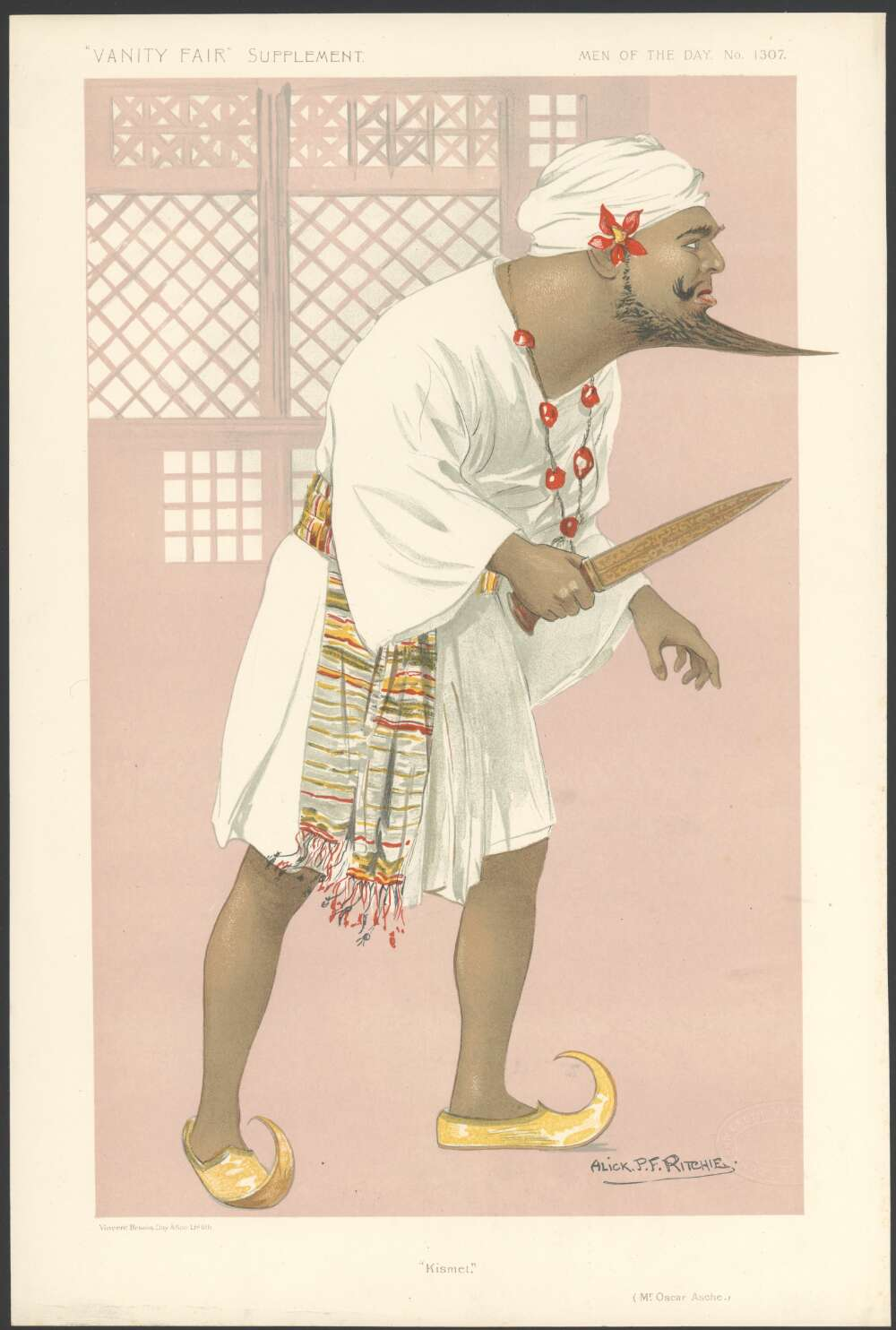
Oscar Asche in the role of Hajj as depicted in Vanity Fair, November 1911

Kismet was first produced by Oscar Asche at the Garrick Theatre, London, on 19 April 1911. Knoblock wrote the play for Asche, with the understanding that Asche could revise it. He shortened and partly re-wrote it and produced it with much success, playing Hajj, the leading man, with Lily Brayton as Marsinah, the leading lady. The costumes were designed by Percy Anderson. The music was composed by Christopher Wilson. The production ran for 328 performances.

The play was then accepted by the Theatrical Syndicate, and staged at the Knickerbocker Theatre in New York, produced by Harrison Grey Fiske. It opened on Broadway on Christmas Day 1911, and the leading roles were then taken by Otis Skinner and Rita Jolivet. This production ran for 184 performances.

== Story ==
Hajj the beggar escapes the clutches of a vengeful bandit, drowns the evil Wazir of Police, catches the eye of the Wazir's voluptuous wife, serves as Emir of Baghdad, and sees his daughter wed to the handsome Caliph.

Asche led a successful tour of the play in Australia in 1911–12, and upon his return to London, he revived Kismet. Asche and Brayton appeared in a 1914 film of the play. It was later filmed in 1920, 1930 and 1944. Skinner played Hajj in the 1920 and 1930 film versions.

In 1953, the story was adapted into the musical by Robert Wright and George Forrest, with themes from the music of Alexander Borodin. The musical was, in turn, adapted into a 1955 film.

== Sources ==
- Gaye, Freda, ed. (1967). Who's Who in the Theatre (fourteenth ed.). London: Sir Isaac Pitman and Sons. OCLC 5997224.

== Full text ==
- Kismet In readable form
- text as .txt file
