= Oscar Asche =

Australian actor and director (1871–1936)

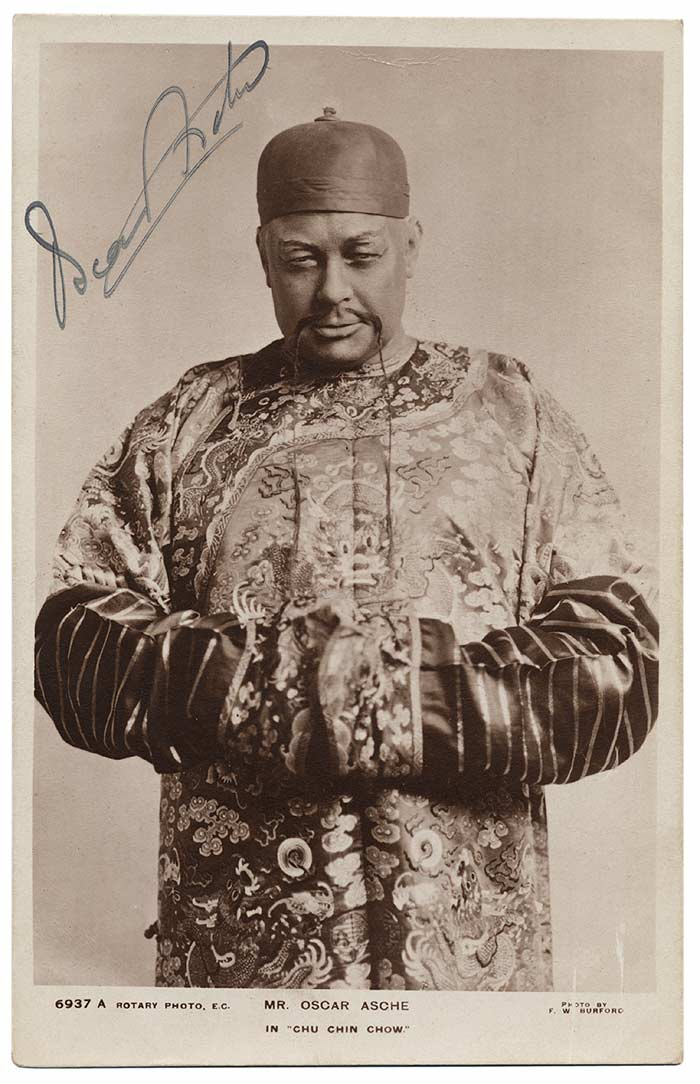
Asche in Chu Chin Chow, 1916

John Stange(r) Heiss Oscar Asche (24 January 1871 – 23 March 1936) was an Australian actor, director, and writer, best known for having written, directed, and acted in the record-breaking musical Chu Chin Chow, both on stage and film, and for acting in, directing, or producing many Shakespeare plays and successful musicals.

After studying acting in Norway and London, Asche made his London stage debut in 1893 and soon joined the F R Benson Company, where he remained for eight years, playing more than a hundred roles including important Shakespearean parts. He married the actress Lily Brayton in 1898, and the two were often paired onstage for many years. He played Maldonado in Arthur Wing Pinero's Iris in the West End in 1901. He repeated the role on Broadway the following year, and then joined Herbert Beerbohm Tree's theatre company in London in 1902, playing more Shakespearean roles over the next few years.

Asche and his wife became managers of the Adelphi Theatre in 1904 and His Majesty's Theatre in 1907; he made his first tour of Australia in 1909–10, and was much moved by his reception in his native land. In 1911 Edward Knoblock wrote the play Kismet for him; Asche revised and shortened it, and the production enjoyed great success in London and on tour with Asche in the leading role of Hajj.

Asche most famously wrote and produced Chu Chin Chow, starring himself and his wife, which ran for an unprecedented 2,238 performances, from 31 August 1916 to 22 July 1921. During the run, among other projects, he directed the hit London production of The Maid of the Mountains. From 1922 to 1924 he toured in Australia with the J C Williamson company. As a result of his high-spending lifestyle, he was declared bankrupt in 1926. Though his success as a producer waned, he continued to direct and act, including in several films, until the mid-1930s.

== Life and career ==
Asche was born in Geelong, Victoria, Australia. His father, Thomas, born in Norway, studied law at Christiania University; he did not pursue a legal career in Australia because he failed to master the English language. After being a digger, a mounted police officer and a storekeeper, Thomas Asche became a prosperous hotel-keeper and publican in Melbourne and Sydney. Asche's mother, Thomas Asche's second wife, Harriet Emma (née Trear), was born in England.

=== Early life and training ===
Asche in The Two Pins, 1908

Asche was educated at Laurel Lodge in Dandenong and the Melbourne Grammar School. He began training with an architect who soon died. He next worked as a jackaroo and then in an office, but he wished to be an actor, and soon began to study acting in Norway.

At Bergen, Asche was instructed in deportment, voice production and theatre arts. He began to study acting in Christiania, but Henrik Ibsen suggested that he return to Australia to gain acting experience in English. By 1892, Asche travelled to London where, after repeated viewings of Henry VIII at the Lyceum Theatre (1892), he continued his acting studies and focused on losing his Australian accent.

=== Early stage career ===
In 1893 Asche played the role of Roberts in Man and Woman at the Opera Comique in London, and for the next eight years, he was engaged by the F. R. Benson Company. Among other venues, they played at the summer Stratford festivals. His more than 100 roles with that company included Charles the Wrestler in As You Like It and Biondello in The Taming of the Shrew, Brutus in Julius Caesar and Claudius in Hamlet. While his father had supported him during his training, he suffered losses in the Australian banking crisis of 1893, and so Asche supported himself on his meager salary of £2 10s. a week.

His resonant voice and his dignified, formal bearing are often mentioned in the reviews of his performances. (Note: For example, The Times described his appearance as the Prince of Morocco in The Merchant of Venice as "magnificent".) He said that he owed his place in Benson's company as much to his cricketing as to his acting abilities: the Benson company fielded a cricket team wherever it toured in the summer months.

In 1898 Asche married Lily Brayton, who also acted with the Benson company.

In 1900 Asche appeared with the Benson Company at the Lyceum Theatre in London. Asche's biographer Richard Foulkes writes, "When Benson brought his itinerant troupe to the Lyceum Theatre in the spring of 1900 Asche appeared in six of the eight productions, most notably as Pistol, Claudius, and Thomas Mowbray, Duke of Norfolk, raising that smallish part to one of sinister grandeur." In 1901 he played Maldonado in Arthur Wing Pinero's Iris at the Garrick Theatre. Both The Times and The Observer remarked that Asche had a difficult role but carried it off. He travelled to America to repeat the role on Broadway in 1902. Back in London, he joined Herbert Beerbohm Tree's theatre company in 1902, and in 1903 he played Benedick in Much Ado About Nothing opposite the Beatrice of Ellen Terry. Other parts were Bolingbroke in Richard II, Christopher Sly and Petruchio in The Taming of the Shrew, Bottom in A Midsummer Night's Dream, and Angelo in Measure for Measure.

=== Actor-manager years ===
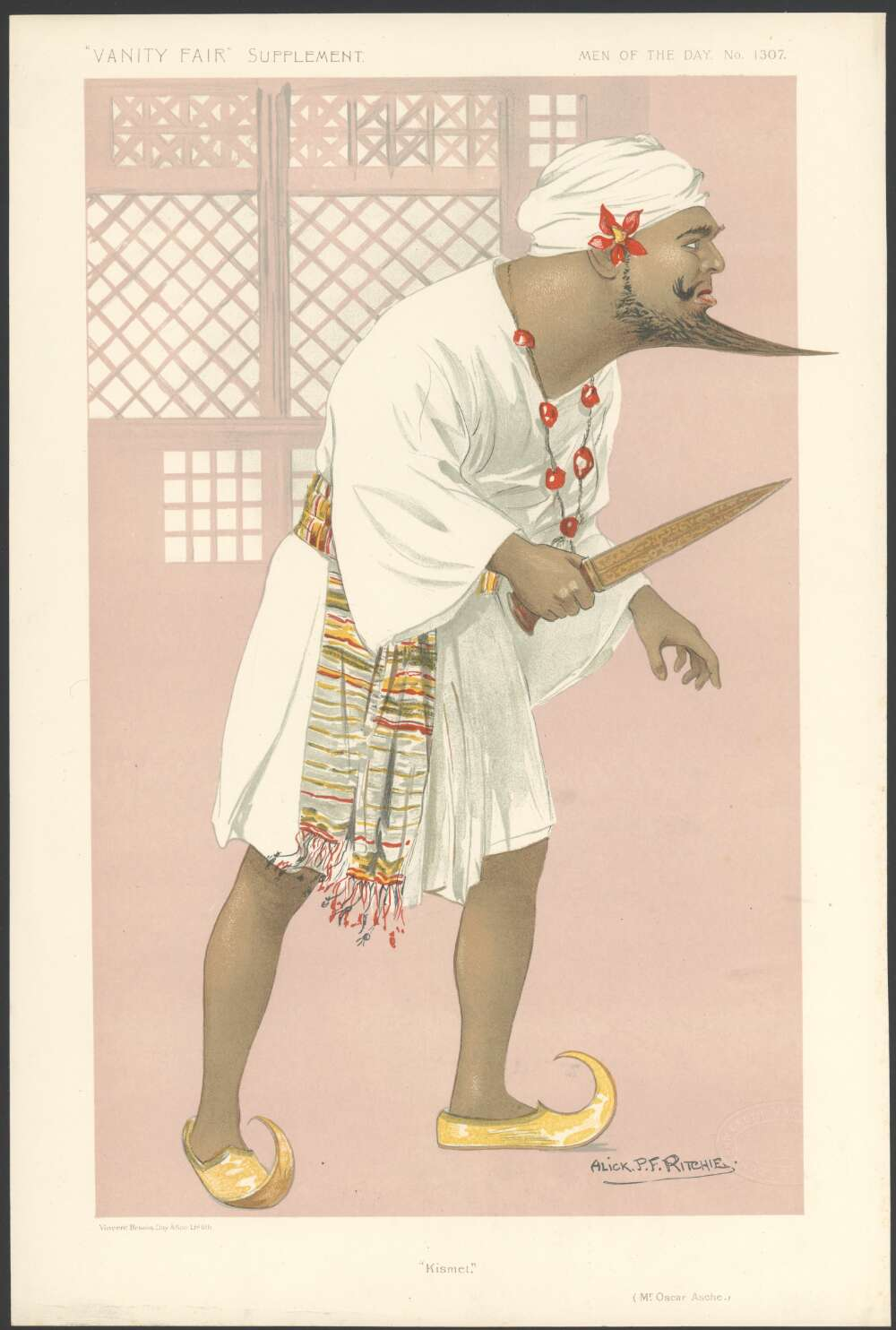
Caricature of Asche in Kismet

In 1904 Asche became co-manager with Otho Stuart of the Adelphi Theatre on a three-year lease. Their productions included The Prayer of the Sword, A Midsummer Night's Dream, The Taming of the Shrew, Measure for Measure, Count Hannibal (which he wrote with F. Norreys Connell) and Rudolf Besier's The Virgin Goddess. In 1906 he played King Mark in J. Comyns Carr's play Tristram and Iseult at the Adelphi Theatre, with Lily Brayton as Iseult and Matheson Lang as Tristram. In 1907 Asche and his wife took over the management of His Majesty's Theatre and produced Laurence Binyon’s Attila, with Asche in the title role, and innovative productions of Shakespeare plays, such as As You Like It, with Asche as Jacques, and Othello, with Asche in the title role. They made their first tour in Australia in 1909–10, with Asche playing Petruchio, Othello and other roles. In his 1929 autobiography he said, "What a home-coming it was! Nothing, nothing can ever deprive me of that."

He produced the play Kismet in London in 1911, also playing the leading role, Hajj. The production ran for two years, and a successful tour in Australia followed in 1911–12, with Kismet, A Midsummer Night's Dream, and Antony and Cleopatra.

In 1916, Asche produced his play Chu Chin Chow, music by Frederic Norton, starring himself as Abu Hassan and his wife; the production ran for 2,238 performances, from 31 August 1916 to 22 July 1921. The run easily broke the existing record of 1,466 performances, set by Charley's Aunt in the 1890s. The new record stood for decades. The show drew some criticism for the ladies' scanty costumes, which Tree described as "more navel than millinery", but it was just what war-weary audiences wanted. Chu Chin Chow also played in New York City in 1917 and Australia in 1920. Asche collaborated in 1919 with Dornford Yates on a musical adaptation of Eastward Ho! Also during the run of Chu Chin Chow, Asche directed the hit London production of The Maid of the Mountains for Robert Evett and the George Edwardes Estate, which had an outstanding run of 1,352 performances. As a director, Asche was an innovator in stage lighting and one of the first to use it as a dramatic factor in productions rather than as mere illumination.

=== Later years ===
Asche's income was considerable by this time, but so were his expenses, including gambling expenses. He bought a farm Gloucestershire and later sold it to pay off debts.

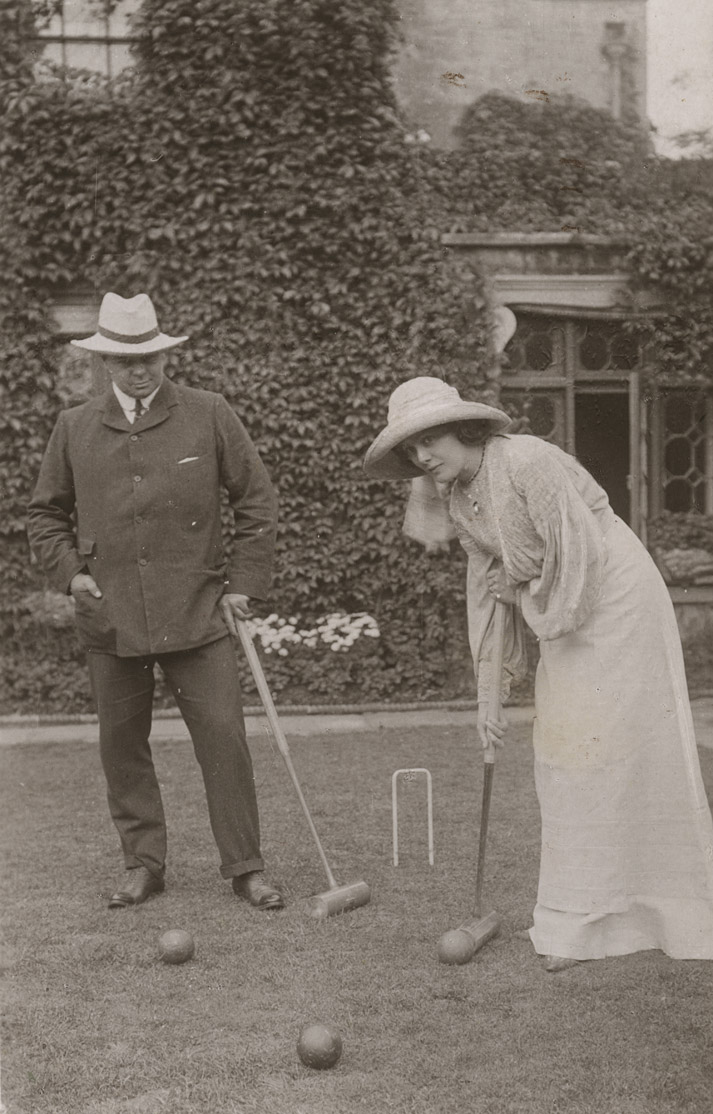
Asche and his wife, Lily Brayton

After the success of Chu Chin Chow, Asche wrote another musical that opened on Broadway in 1920 under the name Mecca and then in London the following year under the name Cairo. It was not a huge success on either side of the Atlantic; in London it ran for 267 performances at His Majestys's. In 1922, Asche visited Australia again, under contract to J. C. Williamson Ltd., and played Hornblower in John Galsworthy's The Skin Game, Maldonado in Pinero's Iris, his usual roles in Chu Chin Chow and Cairo, the title character in Julius Caesar, and in other Shakespeare plays. His wife declined to join him on this tour. After disagreements with the Williamson company, his contract was abruptly terminated in June 1924. On his return to Britain, as a result of excessive gambling, tax debts and unwise investments, he was declared bankrupt in 1926. (Note: Asche was discharged from bankruptcy two years later.)

Further successes eluded Asche as he tried to mount musicals, including The Good Old Days of England (1928), financed by his wife. He continued to direct shows. His 1930 production of The Intimate Revue at the Duchess Theatre was a failure. (Note: This revue is sometimes cited as the shortest-running musical show in West End history, with less than one complete performance. The claim is not wholly correct: after a few days' additional work the revue re-opened later in March 1930. The Times remained unimpressed by the show: "The amusing hitches which varied the monotony of the first performance did not conceal the thinness of the humour and the lameness of the invention".) In 1933 Asche made his last stage appearance in The Beggar’s Bowl at the Duke of York's Theatre. Asche also made appearances in seven films between 1932 and 1936, including in Two Hearts in Waltz Time (1934), as the Spirit of Christmas Present in the 1935 film Scrooge, and in The Private Secretary (1935). He also wrote several books, including his autobiography, but these ventures did not solve his financial troubles.

In his final years, Asche became obese, poor, argumentative and violent. He and his wife separated, but, at the end, he returned to her and died at the age of 65 in Bisham, Berkshire, of coronary thrombosis. He was buried in the riverside cemetery there. He had no children.

== Writings ==
=== Novels and autobiography ===
- Oscar Asche: His Life (1929)
- Saga of Hans Hansen (1930)
- The Joss Sticks of Chung (1931)

=== Plays ===
- Mameena (1914)
- Cairo (1921)
- Chu Chin Chow (1931)
- The Good Old Days
- The Spanish Main (under the pen name Varco Marenes)
- Cairo (libretto)

== Sources ==
- Asche, Oscar (1929). Oscar Asche, his life: by himself. London: Hurst & Blackett. OCLC 1968577.
- Gaye, Freda, ed. (1967). Who's Who in the Theatre (fourteenth ed.). London: Sir Isaac Pitman and Sons. OCLC 5997224.
- Parker, John (1925). Who's Who in the Theatre (fifth ed.). London: Sir Isaac Pitman and Sons. OCLC 10013159.
