= Moss Rose (disambiguation) =

Moss Rose is a football stadium in Macclesfield, Cheshire, England.

Moss Rose may also refer to:

- Moss Rose (film), a 1947 American mystery film directed by Gregory Ratoff
- Moss Rose (novel), a 1934 mystery novel by the British writer Marjorie Bowen

== See also ==
- Moss rose, a common name for the succulent flowering plant Portulaca grandiflora
