= Murders at Stanfield Hall =

Victorian era double murder in 1848 in Norwich, England

Coordinates: 52.56475°N 1.16138°E

James Blomfield Rush and Emily Sandford in 1849

The Murders at Stanfield Hall were a notorious Victorian era double murder on 28 November 1848 that was commemorated in print, pottery, wax, as well as a novel by Joseph Shearing. It was the inspiration for the 1948 English film Blanche Fury. The victims, Isaac Jermy and his son Isaac Jermy were shot and killed on the porch and in the hallway of their mansion, Stanfield Hall, Norwich. The perpetrator, James Bloomfield Rush (1800–1849), their delinquent tenant-farmer, who had conducted a complex, devious scheme to defraud them of their property and their lives, was hanged at Norwich Castle on 21 April 1849. The unwitting accomplice to the attempted fraud was Emily Sandford, whom Rush had employed as a governess and who was also his mistress.

== Events ==
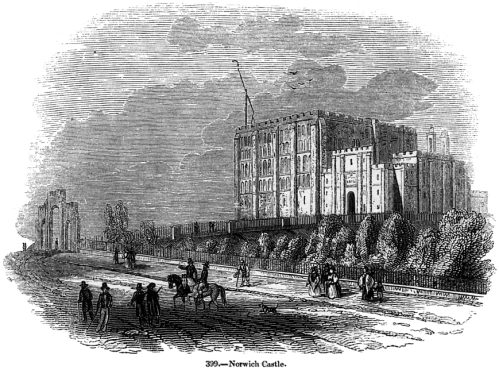
Norwich Castle in 1845; Rush was hanged here in 1849

In 1848, Isaac Jermy and his son Isaac Jermy were shot and killed on the porch and in the hallway of their mansion, Stanfield Hall, Wymondham, near Norwich, by James Bloomfield Rush. Rush had been their tenant for nearly a decade, and he had mortgaged and remortgaged his farm, ostensibly to raise money for improvements, but without any resultant improvement in the farm's output. The deadline to pay off the mortgages was approaching; otherwise foreclosure and eviction would follow, which would adversely affect both his children and his pregnant mistress, their governess Emily Sandford.

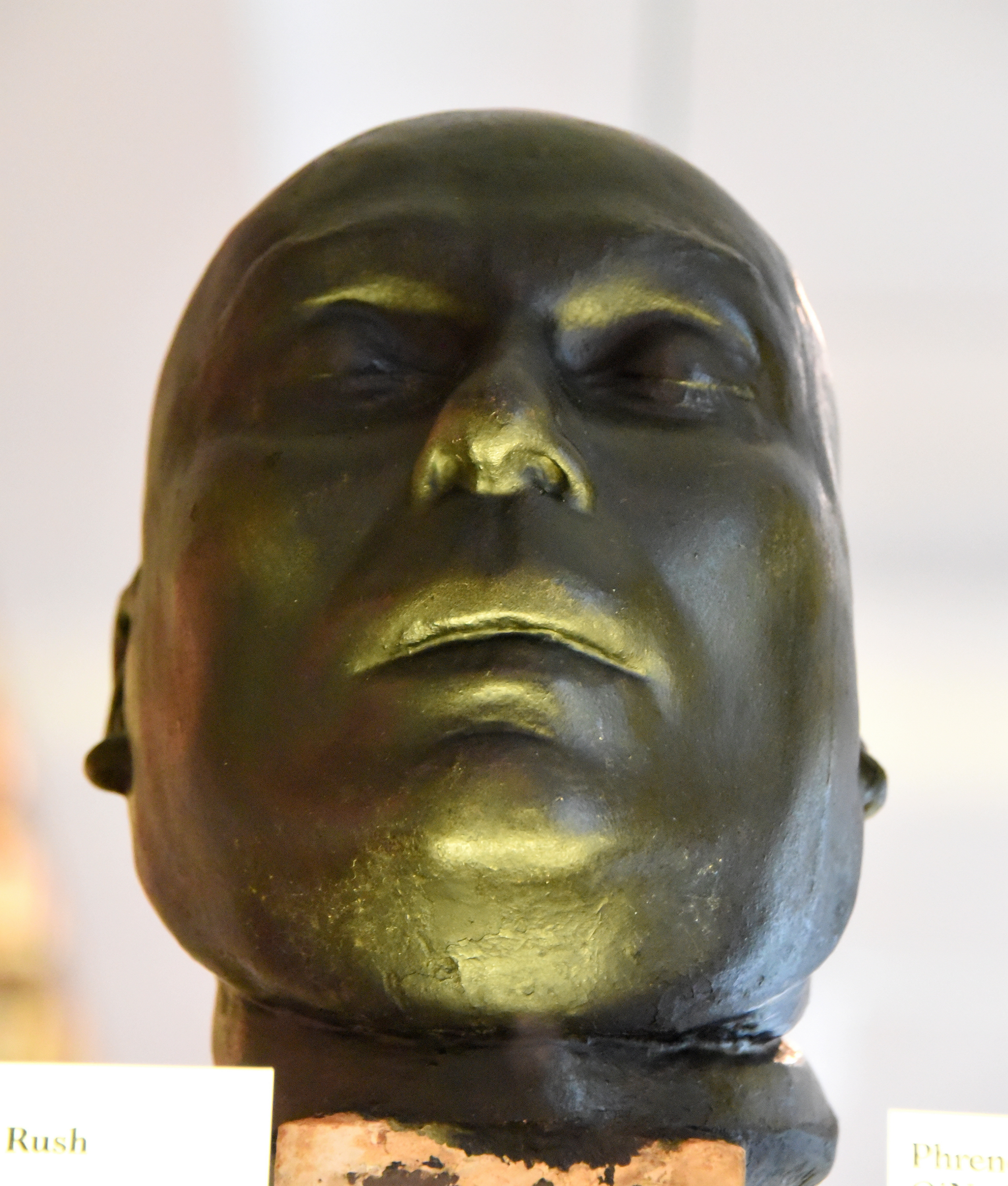
Death mask of James Bloomfield Rush. Paint on plaster, circa 1849 CE. The Wellcome Collection, London

The Jermys had problems with relatives over the title claim to their estate. However, Isaac Jermy was the Recorder of Norwich, a prominent local man with legal connections; thus, it was unlikely that he would lose the property. Rush's plan was to kill both Jermys, their servant, and the younger Jermy's pregnant wife while disguised and blame the massacre on the rival claimants to the estate.

Rush's plan called for Sandford to provide an alibi by stating that he was at the farm during the hour or so that the crime was committed. Rush wore a false wig and whiskers, but failed to hide his body sufficiently, so that the wounded Mrs. Jermy and the servant, Elizabeth Chestney, who both survived, would later identify him. Sandford also refused to support his alibi. Evidence on forgeries involved in the case was given by Alfred Smee, creator of the Bank of England’s official “Bank Black” ink. Tried in 1849, Rush defended himself and was convicted. He was hanged and buried in the grounds of Norwich Castle.

== Popular culture ==
Staffordshire Potteries produced collectable figures of Rush and Sandford, plus the main locations Potash Farm, Stanfield Hall and Norwich Castle. A life-size waxwork representation of Rush was displayed in the Chamber of Horrors at Madame Tussauds in London, from 1849 until 1971.
