= Blanche Fury =

1948 film

- Directed by: Marc Allégret
- Written by: Audrey Erskine Lindop; Cecil McGivern; Hugh Mills
- Based on: Blanche Fury; 1939 novel by Marjorie Bowen
- Produced by: Anthony Havelock-Allan
- Starring: Valerie Hobson; Stewart Granger; Michael Gough
- Cinematography: Guy Green; Geoffrey Unsworth
- Edited by: Jack Harris
- Music by: Clifton Parker
- Production company: Cineguild
- Distributed by: General Film Distributors
- Release date: 19 February 1948
- Running time: 90 minutes
- Country: United Kingdom
- Language: English
- Budget: $1.5 million or £382,175
- Box office: 1,547,740 admissions (France) £200,500 (UK) (by 24 Dec 1949) or £246,800

Blanche Fury is a 1948 British Technicolor drama film directed by Marc Allégret and starring Valerie Hobson, Stewart Granger and Michael Gough. It was written by Audrey Erskine Lindop, Cecil McGivern and Hugh Mills adapted from the 1939 novel of the same title by Joseph Shearing. In Victorian era England, two schemers will stop at nothing to acquire the Fury estate, even murder. The plot is based on the Stanfield Hall slayings, an actual contemporary homicide case.

== Plot ==
Blanche Fuller is a beautiful and spirited woman employed as a domestic servant after the death of her parents. After a succession of failed positions, she receives an invitation from her rich uncle Simon, whom she has never met due to a family break instigated by her father, to become governess to his granddaughter Lavinia.

On arriving at Clare Hall, her uncle's impressive country estate, she first encounters Philip Thorn. She assumes that he is her cousin Laurence because of his striking resemblance to the portrait over the mantelpiece bearing the Fury family crest. In fact, he is the illegitimate and only son of the former owner of the estate, Adam Fury, and is employed by her uncle as the steward. Blanche's uncle explains that, while he was a Fuller when he inherited Clare from Fury's widow, he took the family name, and asks her to change her name as well. Thorn bitterly resents being employed by strangers on an estate that he thinks should be his, and for several months has had a lawyer searching for proof of his legitimacy. He tells Blanche that if she takes the name, she should know the legend of the founder of the Fury family, who was killed during the Crusades. His body was defended even in death by his pet Barbary ape, who is on the family shield, so that the spirit of Fury's ape is said to watch over the rights of the family. He warns Blanche that Fury's ape will not allow imposters to control Clare Hall.

Desiring position and security, Blanche marries her cousin Laurence; however she and Thorn soon begin a love affair. On the day Thorne discovers the lawyer can find no proof that a marriage between Adam Fury and his mother ever took place, Laurence dismisses Thorn after killing one of his favourite mares. That night Thorn kills both Laurence and Simon, and then plants evidence to incriminate a group of gypsies, whom Simon had antagonised in the past.

After the inquest, Thorn is obsessed with the absolute possession of Clare, telling Blanche that it is fate that their children will inherit "our house". Despite warning him that she will destroy him if he harms Lavinia, heir to the estate and final obstacle to his ambition, Blanche discovers him encouraging the child to make a dangerous jump with her pony. She intervenes, and, fearing for the child's life, goes to the police, implicating Thorn in the murder. She confesses to their love in court, where Thorn is acting in his own defence and is ruthlessly questioning her. However, when it is revealed she is pregnant, Thorn, realising that the baby is his, softens and stops questioning her. He then accepts his sentence to be executed, knowing that his death will allow his and Blanche's child to be seen as legitimate and inherit Clare Hall. On the day of his execution, Lavinia goes out alone to try the jump she had been denied. Horrified, Blanche rushes to stop her but is too late and Lavinia breaks her neck at the moment Thorn is hanged. A heartbroken Blanche carries Lavinia's body back to the estate. Stopping at the entrance, she looks up in both grief and horror at the Fury's coat of arms bearing Fury's ape, realising that Thorn was right: Fury's ape would not allow impostors to own Clare Hall.

Months later, Blanche gives birth to a son, secretly Thorn's child. However, the birth combined with her grief proves to be too much for her. Before she dies she names her son Philip Fury. With her death, Clare Hall is returned to a true Fury once again.

== Cast ==
- Valerie Hobson as Blanche Fury
- Stewart Granger as Philip Thorn
- Michael Gough as Laurence Fury
- Walter Fitzgerald as Simon Fury
- Susanne Gibbs (as Suzanne Gibbs) as Lavinia
- Maurice Denham as Major Fraser
- Sybille Binder (as Sybilla Binder) as Louisa
- Ernest Jay as Calamy
- Allan Jeayes as Mr Weatherby
- Edward Lexy as Colonel Jenkins
- Arthur Wontner as Lord Rudford
- Amy Veness as Mrs Winterbourne
- George Woodbridge as Aimes

== Original novel ==
The original novel was published in 1939. Cineguild bought the film rights before the book had even been written.

=== Real-life inspiration ===
In 1848, Isaac Jermy and his son, Isaac Jermy Jr. were shot and killed on the porch and in the hallway, respectively, of their mansion, Stanfield Hall, Norwich, by James Blomfield Rush. Rush had been their tenant farmer for nearly a decade, had made statements that he had mortgaged and remortgaged his farm to raise money for improvements, yet he had not improved the farm's output. The deadline to pay off the mortgages was approaching, otherwise foreclosure and eviction would follow, adversely affecting both his children and his pregnant mistress, Emily Sandford.

The title to the Jermy estate came into question when relatives made claims to it. However, Isaac Jermy was the Recorder of Norwich, a prominent local man with legal connections, and it was therefore unlikely that he would lose the property. Rush's plan was to kill both Jermys and the younger Jermy's pregnant wife while disguised, and blame the massacre on the rival claimants to the estate.

Rush planned that Emily Sandford would provide an alibi by stating that he was at the farm during the hour or so that the crime was committed. Rush wore a false wig and whiskers, but failed to disguise his body sufficiently. The butler, the wounded Mrs Jermy and the housemaid Elizabeth Chestney survived to identify him; furthermore, Emily Sandford refused to support his alibi. Tried in 1849, Rush defended himself but was convicted and subsequently hanged.

== Production ==
Star Valerie Hobson was married to producer Anthony Havelock-Allan. She later recalled "I had just had our son, who was born mentally handicapped, and he meant the film as a sort of 'loving gift', making me back into a leading lady, which was a wonderful idea. The film didn't work completely."

The film was announced in September 1946. (Shortly afterwards 20th Century Fox announced they would make a film from another Shearing novel, Moss Rose.) Stewart Granger, then one of the biggest stars in British films, signed to co-star and Marc Allégret was to direct.

=== Shooting ===
Filming started in January 1947 at Pinewood Studios. The stately home used in the exterior shots is Wootton Lodge in Staffordshire. The courtroom scenes were filmed in the Shire Hall at Stafford. The location scenes for the film were shot at Wootton Lodge (which stood in for Clare Hall in the story), a magnificent three-storey Georgian mansion at Upper Ellastone on the Derbyshire–Staffordshire border and on the surrounding Weaver Hills, as well as on Dunstable Downs, Bedfordshire.

Granger later said the film "was a silly story, too grim and melodramatic, but it's a wonderful looking film... I enjoyed working with Valerie Hobson, but the film didn't work."

Havelock-Allan later said he felt the most exciting aspect of the story was the murder being committed by a "gypsy woman" who was actually a man. However, he says: "Stewart Granger refused to play it dressed as a woman, even though you would only have seen a flash of him, so it lost that high point scene."

Havelock-Allan later acknowledged the film was a disappointment:

We took far too long over Blanche Fury, it cost too much money and it didn't 'work' and never attracted any great audience. David and Ronnie didn't like what I was trying to do with Blanche Fury, which was along the lines of the very successful costume films from Gainsborough. I wanted to make a serious one with a better story and I thought it would make a lot of money. I found out what I was making was a 'hard' film, not a 'soft' film which the others were. There was a real hatred in it as well as love, and the public didn't want it. Cineguild more or less broke up over that.

== Reception ==
=== Box office ===
Trade papers called the film a "notable box office attraction" in British cinemas in 1948. By the end of 1949, it managed to earn £200,500 in box office rentals in the British Isles. However, it was not enough to recoup the film's cost and it recorded a loss of £135,400 (equivalent to £5.38 million in 2024). Another account says it earned producer's receipts of £145,300 in the UK and £101,500 overseas.

=== Critical ===
The Monthly Film Bulletin wrote: "This film, in very pleasing Technicolor, is a pleasure to the eye, rather than to the heart or mind. One has no warm feeling for any of the characters; and Blanche, when she betrays her lover, loses any sympathy she may previously have had. ... Valerie Hobson, as Blanche, is attractive within these limits. Stewart Granger as Philip looks well, but does not bring much subtlety to the portrayal of the fierce and embittered young man. Supporting cast, direction and décor are all good, but there is nothing truly memorable about this film."

Kine Weekly wrote: "Picturesque and violent nineteenth-century costume piece, superbly photographed in Technicolor. Adapted from Joseph Shearing's novel, its emotional explosions, caused by the clash of powerful personalities in the drama, are resolutely acted, cleverly directed and magnificently staged. Its angry, full-blooded theatre carries a rich and compelling facade."

Variety wrote: "It is a morose, moody tale of sex and unabashed villainy. Picture has been well produced although cool calculation is visible in every move of the picture. ... French director Mare Allegret makes his English debut and his technique is evident throughout. He has used color fo great advantage, while his settings and outdoor scenes have immense beauty. This should help put it over although principal b.o pull will be Stewart Granger."

In The Radio Times Guide to Films Sue Heal gave the film 4/5 stars, writing: "Granger is pitted against the best that British melodrama had to offer at the time, including Valerie Hobson in the title role, Maurice Denham and Michael Gough.This also benefits from an excellent screenplay and some taut direction from Marc Allégret, but it's the distinctive atmosphere that lingers in the memory."
