= The Master of Stair =

1907 novel

- First edition under the original title (UK)
- Author: Marjorie Bowen
- Original title: The Glen o' Weeping
- Language: English
- Genre: Historical
- Publisher: Alston Rivers (London); McClure Phillips (New York)
- Publication date: 1907
- Publication place: United Kingdom
- Media type: Print

The Master of Stair is a 1907 historical novel by the British writer Marjorie Bowen. It was her second published novel after her hit debut The Viper of Milan, and was also a bestseller. The plot revolves around the 1689 Massacre of Glencoe in the wake of the Glorious Revolution. It is also known by the alternative title of The Glen o' Weeping.

== Bibliography ==
- Vinson, James. Twentieth-Century Romance and Gothic Writers. Macmillan, 1982.
