= The Poisoners =

The Poisoners may refer to:

- The Poisoners (Hamilton novel), a 1971 novel in the Matt Helm spy series by Donald Hamilton
- The Poisoners (Bowen novel), a 1936 historical mystery novel by Marjorie Bowen
