= Albert Ferber =

Swiss musician

Albert Ferber (29 March 1911 – 11 January 1987) was a Swiss pianist who had an international performing career that spanned four decades and took him across the world.

== Training ==
Albert Ferber was a classical pianist and teacher. He was born in Lucerne, and studied in Switzerland, Germany and France where his teachers included Karl Leimer, Walter Gieseking and Marguerite Long. Whilst in Switzerland he often played to Sergei Rachmaninoff although he never regarded the latter as a teacher in the conventional sense. He first came to England in 1937, basing himself in London permanently from 1939 where he undertook further study with James Ching.

== Conducting and composing ==
Although best known as a concert pianist and recording artist, Ferber had a brief association with the theatre and the cinema, conducting theatre orchestras during the 1940s for productions such as The Beggar's Opera. A little later he appeared as pianist in the Brian Hurst film The Mark of Cain (1947) and composed scores for two films, The Hangman Waits (1947) and Death in the Hand (1948), both directed by the Australian, Albert Barr-Smith. After this, his performing activities prevented any further composition until near the end of his life when he wrote a set of six songs to texts by Paul Verlaine.

== Teaching ==
Alongside his performing work, Ferber had an active teaching career, gaining early experience in Italy where he deputised for his former teacher Karl Leimer. After settling in England, he was employed as piano teacher (and concert manager) at the James Ching Pianoforte School. Later in life he gave many masterclasses in both the UK and Europe for organisations such as the European Piano Teachers Association (EPTA), but it is as a private teacher that he is probably best remembered. Robert Finley recalls that his teacher was an advocate of the Alexander Technique and that "he emphasised relaxation … and avoiding the build up of muscular tension and stress". Kathron Sturrock commends Ferber's "gentle and helpful wisdom" which saw her "through many a dark moment", whilst Penelope Thwaites describes him as an "exceptional teacher … interested in drawing out the individuality of his pupils; believing in that individuality and conveying confidence: a rare gift". She also states that he was "much loved by all his pupils".

== Career outline ==
Ferber's performing career developed in England through a series of Wigmore Hall recitals in the late 1940s and early 1950s, many of which were managed by James Ching Ltd. A successful BBC audition in 1945 led to a concerto appearance for the Corporation and then to engagements with Sir Thomas Beecham and the Royal Philharmonic Orchestra, Josef Krips and the Hallé Orchestra, and further work with Sir Adrian Boult, Sergiu Celibidache, Jascha Horenstein and Hans Schmidt-Isserstedt. His career took him to most parts of the world, although he had a special affinity with South American countries, which he visited many times. In the UK he made regular recital appearances in London at the Queen Elizabeth and Wigmore Halls and continued to broadcast for the BBC until illness ended his performing career. He died in 1987.

== Repertoire ==
As soloist with orchestra, Ferber played several concertos by Mozart and Beethoven as well as the first, second and fourth of the Rachmaninoff concertos, the second by Chopin, Mendelssohn and Camille Saint-Saëns, and those by Schumann and Grieg. More unusually, the Concerto for Piano and Strings by Robert Gerhard featured in his repertoire. He also appeared as accompanist to Alexander Kipnis in Schubert's Winterreise (at the age of 18) and as chamber musician, playing with Henryk Szeryng (violin) and Ernesto Xancó (cello) in duos, and with both artists in trios.

Ferber was most active as a solo recitalist, the pianist's repertoire being extensive and wide-ranging. In addition to standard works by J. S. Bach, Beethoven, Brahms, Chopin, Rachmaninoff and Schubert, Ferber played many lesser-known twentieth-century works such as the piano sonatas by Ernest Bloch, Frank Bridge and Robert Simpson, and Robert Gerhard's Don Quixote suite. In July 1947 he gave the first performance of Lennox Berkeley's Six Preludes for Piano at Broadcasting House and in May 1951 premiered Gerhard's Three Impromptus at the Wigmore Hall. Even when playing works by mainstream composers, Ferber tended to avoid the obvious and introduced audiences to comparative rarities such as Beethoven's Variations on Salieri's La Stessa, la Stessissima, Chopin's Variations on a German Folksong and Schumann's Sonata No. 3. However, the artist was especially drawn to French repertoire, in particular the music of Gabriel Fauré and Claude Debussy, whose œuvre often featured in his concerts. His recital programmes were always imaginative and varied, often structured around collections of shorter items rather than major works, though the latter were included.

== Recordings ==
Albert Ferber's playing is well represented on disc, one of his earliest LP recordings, of Mendelssohn's Songs Without Words and Schumann's Kinderscenen, appearing in 1951 for Decca. In the same year he made a live recording of Brahms's Variations on a Theme of Haydn for two pianos, partnering Adelina de Lara at her ‘farewell’ Wigmore Hall concert. Over the next thirty years he recorded, for Saga Records, Fauré's piano music (in two volumes), sonatas by Beethoven and Balakirev, along with pieces by Brahms, Chopin, Chopin-Liszt, Debussy, Liszt, Ravel and Smetana. Saga also issued an LP of his recordings of "The World's Best Loved Piano Music". For Meridian, he recorded music by Chaminade, Debussy, Fauré, Ibert, Poulenc and Satie; for Rare Recorded Editions, he made an LP of Rachmaninov's Sonata No. 1 and Variations on a Theme of Chopin; and for the Ducretet-Thomson label, he recorded two sets of Beethoven variations and nearly all of Debussy's piano music. His final recording, made in 1981 for Hyperion, was of the Schubert Impromptus D899 and 935. In the last few years, Forgotten Records has reissued some of his Debussy and Beethoven recordings, and all of his Debussy recordings have been reissued by French EMI. Most recently, Ferber's complete Decca recordings from 1945 to 1951 were released on CD. Despite some resurgence of interest in the 21st century, as Robin O’Connor formerly of Saga Records observes, the pianist is now almost unknown.^{4}

== Style ==
His sound was distinctive: clear in texture and articulation, and of a fragile beauty which some critics felt could become hard under pressure. His recording of the Balakirev sonata, the finale in particular, demonstrates that his playing was sometimes technically fallible, but he could always identify with the style and underlying spirit of a work and, in concert, his performances seemed to convey musical essence rather than pianistic ego. His strengths were probably most consistently shown to best effect in the music of Fauré where his tonal shading and undemonstrative interpretation – ‘art concealing art’ – attracted universal admiration.

== Sources ==
- Coore, Rita: 'Ferber - a pianist worth going anywhere to hear' in The Daily Gleaner (Jamaica), May 1952
- Harding, James: 'Musician before virtuoso' in Records and Recording, July 1979
- Humphreys, Ivor: 'Albert Ferber' in Hi-Fi News, August 1979
- British Library Sound Archive, September 2007
- Mr Ferber's personal journals
