= So Evil My Love =

1948 film by Lewis Allen

- Theatrical release poster
- Directed by: Lewis Allen
- Screenplay by: Ronald Millar; Leonard Spigelgass
- Based on: the novel by For Her to See by Marjorie Bowen
- Produced by: Hal B. Wallis
- Starring: Ray Milland; Ann Todd; Geraldine Fitzgerald
- Cinematography: Mutz Greenbaum
- Edited by: Vera Campbell; Leonard Trumm
- Music by: William Alwyn; Victor Young
- Production companies: Paramount Pictures, Inc.
- Distributed by: Paramount British Pictures
- Release dates: 3 March 1948 (London); 21 July 1948 (New York City)
- Running time: 112 minutes
- Countries: United Kingdom; United States
- Language: English
- Budget: $2.5 million

So Evil My Love is a 1948 British and American Gothic psychological thriller film directed by Lewis Allen and starring Ray Milland, Ann Todd and Geraldine Fitzgerald.

So Evil My Love is a period drama set in the Victorian era, and shot in film noir style in the late-1940s subgenre often referred to as "Gaslight noir". The film is based on the popular 1947 For Her to See novel by Marjorie Bowen (published under the pseudonym Joseph Shearing). Elements of the plot are based on the mysterious death of barrister Charles Bravo in 1876. The conclusion may also be based on the death (in New York City, in 1904) of Cesar Young by Nan Patterson.

== Plot ==
On board a ship traveling to Liverpool, England, from the West Indies, Anglican missionary's widow Olivia Harwood (Ann Todd) is prevailed on to help nurse malarial patients on the lower decks. There she meets the suavely handsome Mark Bellis (Ray Milland), who has been taken ill. Despite Mark's vagueness about his life and past, the couple strike up a friendship. Fully recovered by the time the ship docks, Mark persuades Olivia to allow him to take up residence in the lodging house she has inherited from her late husband. He proceeds to work a smooth line of seduction on her, while still finding time to also use his charms on the more worldly and vulgar Kitty (Moira Lister).

Mark's past as an art thief and forger is revealed as he reunites with former partner-in-crime Edgar Bellamy (Raymond Lovell) and the two plan a daring art heist. Things go awry, and they are forced to flee emptyhanded, narrowly avoiding police bullets. Returning to Olivia, he tells her he intends to leave London to try to make good elsewhere. However, she has now fallen under his romantic spell and is prepared to do anything to keep him with her. The couple are in dire need of money, and Olivia is persuaded to insinuate herself into the home of her wealthy former schoolfriend Susan Courtney (Fitzgerald) and her older husband Henry (Raymond Huntley). She finds Susan in a state of neurosis and barely suppressed hysteria, worn down by the criticisms of the cold and sneering Henry, who agrees to employ her as Susan's live-in companion. Under Mark's urging, she immediately begins to pilfer stocks and bonds and small valuables from the Courtney household, passing them on to Mark to turn into cash.

Mark meanwhile has discovered an old bundle of letters from Susan to Olivia, containing youthfully indiscreet descriptions of romantic dalliances and questionable moral conduct. Realising that making public the contents of the letters would ruin the Courtneys' social reputation, he believes that he has hit the financial jackpot. As low as she has already sunk under his influence however, Olivia finds the notion of blackmail repugnant and a step too far down the road of criminality. She flees from the Courtneys and looks into the possibility of a return to overseas missionary work, only to find that a lone woman is not wanted. She finds herself sheltering in a gloomy church, where Mark somehow manages to track her down. In despair, she falls for his blandishments and submits herself again to his control and instructions, blackmail and all.

Olivia returns to the Courtney household and sets in motion the blackmail plan, while Mark continues to dally with Kitty and gifts her a locket which was given to him by Olivia. Unknown to Olivia or Susan, Henry has become exasperated by Susan's apparent inability to produce the heir he craves, and is plotting to have her committed to a distant mental asylum. He has also employed a private detective (Leo G. Carroll), who has managed to trace the missing stocks and bonds back to Mark and has built up a dossier of his criminal past.

Henry locks the horrified Susan in her room to await the arrival of the sanatorium doctors and orders Olivia out of the house. At Mark's behest, she returns to step up the blackmail threat, but is countered by Henry confronting her with the information he has on Mark, which would be more than enough to hang him. A struggle ensues, and Henry collapses with a life-threatening heart attack. Olivia releases Susan and tricks her into giving her husband a dose of medicine laced with poison. Henry succumbs, the police are summoned and the hopelessly confused and incoherent Susan makes what sounds like a confession to murder. She is taken away to prison to face the prospect of the gallows.

Mark announces his intention to take Olivia away with him to a new life in America, beyond the reach of British prosecution. Olivia however is conscience-stricken about Susan, and matters take a fatal turn when she runs into Kitty, wearing the incriminating locket. All her illusions about Mark's love for her suddenly shattered, she finally realises that she has all along been no more than a willing pawn in his game. Keeping her own counsel, she waits until the opportunity arises in a hansom cab to take her ultimate revenge by fatally stabbing Mark. The film ends with Olivia entering a police station to turn herself in.

== Cast ==
- Ray Milland as Mark Bellis
- Ann Todd as Olivia Harwood
- Geraldine Fitzgerald as Susan Courtney
- Leo G. Carroll as Jarvis
- Raymond Huntley as Henry Courtney
- Raymond Lovell as Edgar Bellamy
- Martita Hunt as Mrs. Courtney
- Moira Lister as Kitty Feathers
- Roderick Lovell as Sir John Curle
- Muriel Aked as Miss Shoebridge
- Finlay Currie as Dr. Krylie
- Maureen Delany as Curtis
- Ivor Barnard as Mr. Watson
- Ernest Jay as Smathers
- Hugh Griffith as Coroner
- Zena Marshall as Lisette
- Eliot Makeham as Joe Helliwell
- Guy Le Feuvre as Dr. Pound
- Vincent Holman as Rogers
- Chris Halward as Alice
- John Wilder as Footman
- Leonie Lamartine as Proprietress
- Clarence Bigge as Dr. Cunningham

== Production ==
So Evil My Love began principal photography at Denham Studios and on location in London, on 6 May and wrapped production on 12 August 1947. Although the lead roles were played by Hollywood actors Milland, Todd and Fitzgerald, each British-born star had made their mark first in their homeland. However, Todd would make only one Hollywood film, The Paradine Case.

== Critical reception ==
Bosley Crowther in his review for The New York Times wrote, "Withal, there is too much confusion of a rather commonplace plot in the script prepared by Ronald Miller and Leonard Spigelgass. Too much time is wasted with tempting yet trivial details of a complex maneuver at extortion to maintain anxiety. So, by the time the poison is passing and the big retribution scenes set in, the audience is likely to be meandering down the street several blocks ahead of them."

In their 1968 critical study, Hollywood in the Forties, Charles Higham and Joel Greenberg call So Evil My Love an "impressive record of a woman's greed."

The chief fascination of the film, full of fog, ferns and plush... lies in its portrait of will. Behind the discreet Victorian front of Olivia Harwood we are made to feel a psyche of refined steel. As we follow her into her employers house, as we see her conflict with his mother and finally poison him, sending her friend to the galows, we watch her every move with the fascination of a chess audience. Each gambit is ploted with care, each tiny victory marked up, until we are totally involved in her fate, and Ann Todd's portrait of the character is a masterpiece of the actress's art.

More recently, the TV Guide called it "... an intriguing film, although a little on the talky side. The performances are excellent throughout, with Milland shining as the cad, the type of role in which he excelled." Further, Jay Seaver at the eFilmCritic.com noted "... an enjoyably pulpy bit of gaslight crime"; and film critic Nick Beal atNoiroftheweek called it "incandescently splendid."

== Home media ==
As of 2025, Stage Door has been released on DVD and Blu-ray in the US by Universal and Kino Lorber respectively, and in the UK and France by other labels.

== Bibliography ==
- Goble, Alan. The Complete Index to Literary Sources in Film. London: Walter de Gruyter, 1999. ISBN 978-1-8573-9229-6.
