= Penelope Thwaites =

Australian pianist and composer

Penelope Mary Thwaites AM is a concert pianist and composer, recording artist and editor. Born in the United Kingdom of Australian parents, she is a citizen of both countries. Thwaites is best-known for her interpretations of the music of Australian composers, particularly Percy Grainger.

== Biography ==
She grew up in Melbourne, Australia, attending Tintern Grammar and taking a degree in Music from Melbourne University (B.Mus Hons, 1966), where she won the Ormond Exhibition and was placed first in her final year. Following a period of working internationally as musical director and composer of music for the theatre, she continued orchestration studies in London with William L Reed and piano studies with the Swiss pianist Albert Ferber.

Her debut at London’s Wigmore Hall in 1974 was followed by concerts and broadcasts in the UK and tours worldwide, both as solo recitalist and concerto soloist. In 1993, she appeared in the Australia Day Gala at the Royal Opera House in the presence of the Prince of Wales.

Thwaites has appeared as soloist with orchestras including the London Philharmonic, Philharmonia, BBC Concert Orchestra and leading orchestras in Australia, Europe and America.

== Repertoire and recordings ==
Her concert repertoire encompasses a wide range of classical composers, some represented on her 2008 CD Travelling Between Worlds (LIR). Her Bach recording (2014) for the same label was reviewed by BBC Music Magazine: "Thwaites responds with expressive, luxuriant playing and an intuitive sense of the music’s architecture."

Beginning in 1975, Thwaites has made a point of including music by Australian composers such as Malcolm Williamson, Margaret Sutherland, Arthur Benjamin, Peggy Glanville-Hicks, Jennifer Fowler, Alison Bauld, David Worrall, and many more, whether in solo recitals, concertos and chamber works. Her pioneering LP Australian Piano Music (Discourses 1980) was broadcast worldwide as something of a novelty at the time.

Thwaites found a special affinity with the music of Melbourne-born pianist and composer Percy Grainger. She has now recorded more than 260 tracks of his music: first for Pearl records (most of the four-hand repertoire with John Lavender). Her first solo discs were for Unicorn Kanchana and Regis. Most notably, Penelope is a featured solo, chamber and orchestral artist on eight of Chandos Records' 21-CD Grainger Edition (re-issued in 2021).

In 2016, Heritage Records released a box set of the complete Grainger music for two pianos four hands, featuring the three earlier recordings by Thwaites and Lavender together with a fourth CD recorded in 2016 by Penelope with Timothy Young. BBC Music Magazine (February 2017) commented "passion undimmed, along with dexterity, the playing’s flair and precision are unchanged...Listening again only makes the heart grow fonder...I can't think of another composer who so quickly and quirkily enhances life."

== Other activities ==
Her lectures and broadcasts on the composer and detailed research into his life and work led to her editing The New Percy Grainger Companion (Boydell & Brewer 2010, paperback edition 2016). She was Artistic Director for two major Grainger Festivals in London (St John's Smith Square in 1998 and a four-day celebration at King's Place in 2011 to commemorate the 50th anniversary of Grainger's death.

Her interest in promoting Australian composition led to her founding and chairing the international Performing Australian Music Competition which took place in London in 2001 and 2008, attracting young musicians from 20 countries who chose and performed music of 80 Australian composers. The competition still awaits a long-term sponsor.

From 2013 to 2019, she served as Chairman of the Order of Australia Association UK/Europe.

== Composing work ==
In the same year that she gave her second Wigmore Hall recital (1976), her musical (with Alan Thornhill) Ride! Ride! (based on an incident in the life of John Wesley) premiered at the Westminster Theatre in London's West End, following a nationwide tour. The musical has had more than 40 productions since then – both amateur and professional - and a concert version was recorded in 1999 on the SOMM label, starring the legendary actor, Keith Michell. Thwaites's compositions include songs, organ and piano works, chamber music, film and ballet music. She is published by Bardic Edition, whose catalogue is now distributed under the Schott Music imprint. In 2020, SOMM recordings released "From Five Continents", a CD of twenty-four of Penelope's choral works and songs, with Ex Cathedra under Jeffrey Skidmore and soloists Carolyn Sampson, James Gilchrist and William Dazeley.

== Recognition ==
Penelope received the International Grainger Society's Medallion in 1992 and was appointed a Member of the Order of Australia (AM) in 2001 "for service to music through the performance and promotion of Australian compositions in the United Kingdom and internationally". She is a Steinway Artist and a represented composer with the Australian Music Centre.

== Personal life ==
In 1981, she married Edward Jackson CBE, a barrister, cricketer, and coach. She has a son, Matthew and a daughter, Lucy.
