= Blanche Fury (novel) =

1939 novel

- First edition
- Author: Marjorie Bowen
- Language: English
- Genre: Mystery thriller
- Publisher: Heinemann (UK); Harrison-Hilton Books (US)
- Publication date: 1939
- Publication place: United Kingdom
- Media type: Print

Blanche Fury is a 1939 mystery thriller novel by the British writer Marjorie Bowen, published under the pen name of Joseph Shearing. It was republished as an Armed Services Edition during the Second World War.

== Film adaptation ==
In 1948 it was adapted into a British film of the same title directed by Marc Allégret and starring Valerie Hobson and Stewart Granger.

== Bibliography ==
- Goble, Alan. The Complete Index to Literary Sources in Film. Walter de Gruyter, 1999.
- Vinson, James. Twentieth-Century Romance and Gothic Writers. Macmillan, 1982.
