= Album Leaf (novel) =

1933 novel

- First US edition
- Author: Marjorie Bowen
- Cover artist: Arthur Hawkins
- Language: English
- Genre: Gothic
- Publisher: Heinemann (London); Smith and Haas (New York)
- Publication date: 1933
- Publication place: United Kingdom
- Media type: Print

Album Leaf is a 1933 novel by the British writer Marjorie Bowen, written under the pen name of Joseph Shearing. It was published in the United States in 1934 under the alternative title The Spider in the Cup, where it became a bestseller. Like a number of her works, the novel has a Gothic tone.

== Synopsis ==
A young orphaned Englishwoman accepts an offer to become a paid companion to two reclusive aristocratic women in France. There she encounters the daughter of the house, badly scarred following her suicide attempt after she had been unable to marry a cad now serving in French Algeria. She also meets the daughter's prospective husband, a cousin named Louis who is clearly after her money and spends a lot of his time experimenting with his chemistry.

== Bibliography ==
- Vinson, James. Twentieth-Century Romance and Gothic Writers. Macmillan, 1982.
