= The Crime of Laura Sarelle =

1940 novel

- 1941 US edition
- Author: Marjorie Bowen
- Language: English
- Genre: Gothic Drama
- Publisher: Hutchinson (UK); Smith & Durrell (US)
- Publication date: 1940
- Publication place: United Kingdom
- Media type: Print

The Crime of Laura Sarelle is a 1940 novel by the British author Marjorie Bowen, published under the pen name Joseph Shearing. The original title was simply Laura Sarelle. A Gothic story, it takes place in Ireland at the crumbling ancestral home of the Sarelles.

== Bibliography ==
- Vinson, James. Twentieth-Century Romance and Gothic Writers. Macmillan, 1982.
