= The Scandal of Sophie Dawes =

1934 book

- First US edition
- Author: Marjorie Bowen
- Language: English
- Genre: Historical non fiction
- Publisher: John Lane (London); Appleton (New York)
- Publication date: 1934
- Publication place: United Kingdom
- Media type: Print

The Scandal of Sophie Dawes is a 1934 historical non-fiction work by Marjorie Bowen. It is based on the life of the Sophie Dawes, Baronne de Feuchères an English adventuress who became a courtesan in Restoration France following the fall of Napoleon. It was positively reviewed in the New York Times on its 1935 American publication.

== Bibliography ==
- Searle, Adrian. The Infamous Sophie Dawes: New Light on the Queen of Chantilly. Pen and Sword History, 2020.
- Vinson, James. Twentieth-Century Romance and Gothic Writers. Macmillan, 1982.
