= Ernest Jay =

British actor (1893–1957)

- in Blanche Fury (1948)
- Born: 18 September 1893; London, England
- Died: 8 February 1957 (aged 63); London, England
- Occupation: Actor

Ernest Jay (18 September 1893 – 8 February 1957) was a British actor.

== Selected filmography ==
- My Lucky Star (1933) - Press Agent
- Tiger Bay (1934) - Alf
- The Iron Duke (1934) - First Orderly
- The Phantom Light (1935) - Railway Worker (uncredited)
- Checkmate (1935) - Huntly
- Rhodes of Africa (1936) - Minor Role (uncredited)
- Broken Blossoms (1936) - Alf
- Men of Yesterday (1936)
- The House of the Spaniard (1936)
- O.H.M.S. (1937) - (uncredited)
- The Song of the Road (1937) - Tinker
- I See Ice (1938) - Theater Manager
- Don't Take It to Heart (1944) - Tripp, Reporter
- School for Secrets (1946) - Dr. Dainty
- Vice Versa (1948) - Bowler
- Death in the Hand (1948) - MacRae
- Blanche Fury (1948) - Calamy
- So Evil My Love (1948) - Smathers
- The History of Mr. Polly (1949) - Mr. Hinks
- Edward, My Son (1949) - Walter Prothin
- Golden Arrow (1949) - Mr. Felton
- The Reluctant Widow (1950)
- The Franchise Affair (1951) - Ramsden
- I Believe in You (1952) - Mr. Quayle
- Top Secret (1952) - Professor Layton
- Grand National Night (1953) - Railway Official
- The Sword and the Rose (1953) - Lord Chamberlain
- Reluctant Bride (1955) - Minister
- Who Done It? (1956) - Scientist
- Doctor at Large (1957) - Charles Hopcroft
- The Curse of Frankenstein (1957) - Undertaker (uncredited) (final film role)
