= Mistress Nell Gwyn =

Novel by Marjorie Bowen

- Author: Marjorie Bowen
- Language: English
- Publication date: 1926

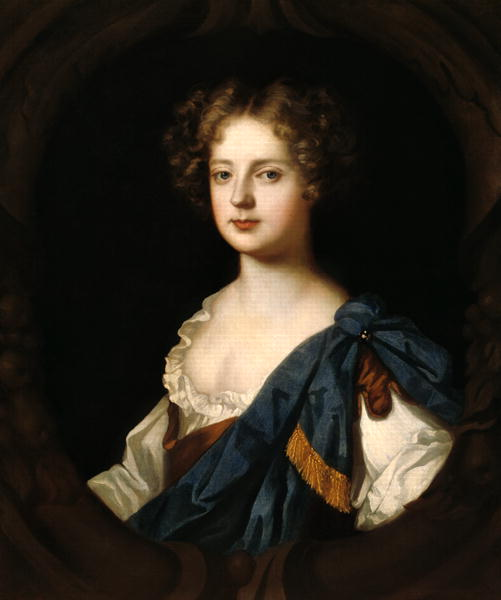
Portrait of Nell Gwyn (c. 1680) by Sir Peter Lely

Mistress Nell Gwyn is the title of the New York edition of an historical novel by the British writer Marjorie Bowen. The book was also published in London with the title Nell Gwyn: A Decoration. The book was first published in 1926.

The story depicts the life of Nell Gwyn and her rise from an orange seller to the mistress of Charles II of England during the seventeenth century. Bowen states in the preface that very little is known about Nell Gwyn and that what history and tradition do "tell us of Nell Gwyn has been told as a decorative romance, where no liberty has been taken with what we know or believe to be truth." Great affairs have been left out and details of the reign of Charles II are provided only as a background for the figure of the heroine.

== Adaptations ==
The year of its publication, the novel was adapted for the silent film Nell Gwyn, a prestige production directed by Herbert Wilcox for which the Hollywood actress Dorothy Gish was brought over to Britain to play Gwyn.

The novel also provided inspiration for Nell Gwynn the 1934 sound remake of the film, also directed by Herbert Wilcox.

== Publication details ==
- Bowen, Majorie (1926). Nell Gwyn : a decoration. London: Hodder & Stoughton. OCLC 229426583.
- Bowen, Majorie (1926). Mistress Nell Gwyn. New York: D. Appleton. OCLC 613218791.
