= Alexis Leon Louis Valbrun =

French painter (1803–1852)

- Born: January 3, 1803; Paris, France
- Died: 1852 (aged 48–49); Paris, France
- Education: École nationale supérieure des Beaux-Arts
- Occupation: Painter

Alexis Leon Louis Valbrun (January 3, 1803 – 1852) was a French painter specialized in portraits of the European aristocracy. He studied under Nicolas Gosse and was a pupil of Antoine-Jean Gros. He entered the École nationale supérieure des Beaux-Arts in Paris in 1817 and exhibited his work at the Salon between 1831 and 1843. Some of his paintings are displayed at the Fondation Calvet in Avignon, the Palace of Versailles (Philip V of Spain) and the Chateau de Chantilly (Sophie Dawes, Baronne de Feucheres). His historic painting La mort de Saphire (Fine Art Museum in Saint Lo) was exhibited at the Salon in 1843. In 1846 he decorated the church Saint-Paul-Saint-Louis in Paris.

== Gallery ==
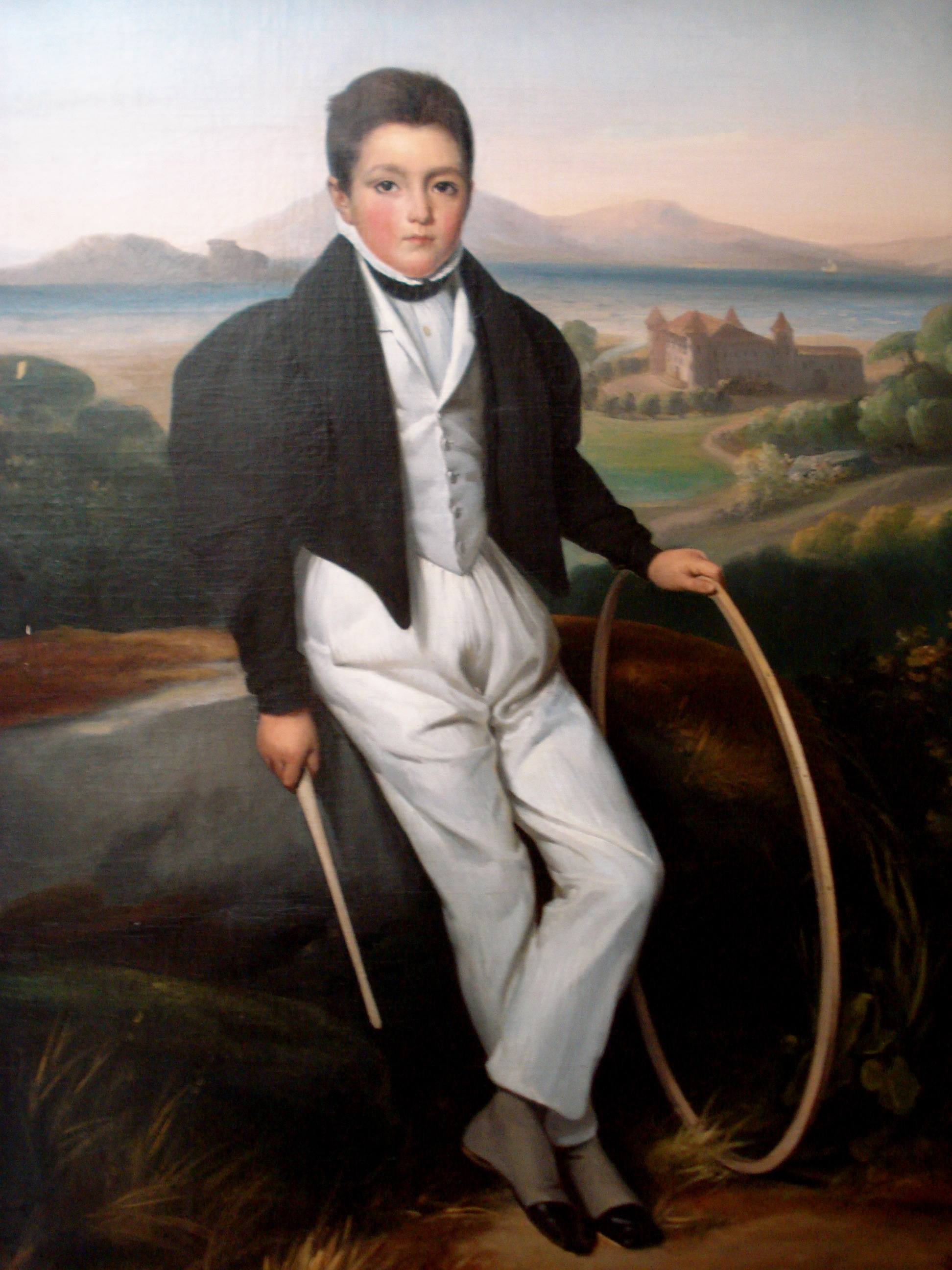
Prince Ferdinand, Duke of Genoa

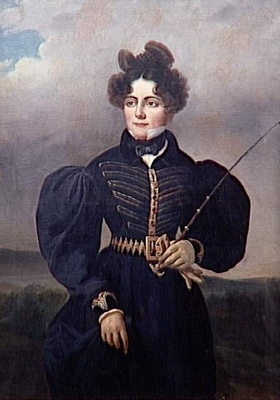
Sophie Dawes
