= The Mark of Cain (1947 film) =

- Film poster
- Directed by: Brian Desmond Hurst
- Written by: Christianna Brand; Francis Crowdy
- Based on: Airing in a Closed Carriage by Marjorie Bowen
- Produced by: W. P. Lipscomb
- Starring: Eric Portman; Sally Gray; Patrick Holt; Dermot Walsh
- Cinematography: Erwin Hillier
- Edited by: Sidney Stone
- Music by: Bernard Stevens
- Production company: Two Cities Films
- Distributed by: General Film Distributors
- Release date: 31 December 1947
- Running time: 88 minutes
- Country: United Kingdom
- Language: English
- Budget: £253,400
- Box office: £75,800

The Mark of Cain is a 1947 British drama film directed by Brian Desmond Hurst and starring Eric Portman, Sally Gray, Patrick Holt and Dermot Walsh. It was written by Christianna Brand and Francis Crowdy based on the 1943 novel Airing in a Closed Carriage by Marjorie Bowen (as Joseph Shearing), which in turn was based on the true life murder trial of Florence Maybrick.

== Plot ==
English industrialist Richard Howard visits Bordeaux, France to buy cotton for his mills from Sarah Bonheur, He becomes enamoured of Sarah and spends much of his business trip sight-seeing. When his younger brother, John arrives to close the deal, he also is attracted to Sarah, and after a whirlwind courtship, marries her.

When living a lonely existence in John's grand house in Manchester, England, Sarah confides to Richard that she is depressed by her marriage. John has no time for her, spends almost all his time out of the house, and puts a strict nurse in charge of their small daughter, discharging the French nurse Sarah had engaged. Sarah's efforts at entertaining John's business associates are regarded as 'too French' and John feels they make him look foolish. Richard, pretending reluctance to cause any trouble between husband and wife, tells Sarah that her husband is having an affair, and encourages her to divorce John. She visits a lawyer, who tells her she has no right to any of the fortune she brought to the marriage as there was no agreement drawn up before they wed. She decides to leave him anyway, but he strikes her, and says if she leaves, by law she cannot take their child with her without his permission, so she agrees to stay. That night her husband asks her forgiveness and tells her he will not oppose her leaving with the child, but that he truly loves her and regrets what has happened, and how he has treated her. Sarah says she still loves him too, and they reconcile completely. However, soon afterwards, John falls dangerously ill, and a doctor is called. Dr. White is suspicious of the circumstances behind John's rapid decline and suspects poison, but doesn't realise that it is Richard who is slowly killing his brother, while fomenting suspicion of Sarah with the servants and the doctor.

John suddenly realises what is happening and tries to call for help, but Richard holds his weakened brother down on the bed and, before placing a pillow over his face, informs him that he will have Sarah accused of his murder, then, when he saves her, she will be so grateful that she will do anything he wants.

After John's death, Sarah is arrested. The prosecutor makes much of Sarah's purchase of arsenic, which she says she bought to make a paste to cover the bruise on her face from when John hit her. Richard had also planted small traces of arsenic in Sarah's things, and the doubts he had deliberately implanted in the servants' minds are used against her, as is the false suggestion that she was having an affair with Jerome, the son of business associates of John's.

Things look bad for Sarah until Richard gives testimony in the witness box, when he successfully pours scorn on the interpretation of the evidence given by previous witnesses, with the crowd in the courtroom clearly being swayed by his words. However, he inadvertently says something that makes Sarah look guilty, and she is sentenced to death.

He is panic stricken that he has not saved her, shouting out in the court that she is innocent, but later says that he has done all he can to save her and can do no more. Jerome, who has fallen in love with Sarah and believes in her innocence, suddenly realises that Richard had a motive for John's death and sets out to find the truth.

== Cast ==
- Eric Portman as Richard Howard
- Sally Gray as Sarah Bonheur
- Patrick Holt as John Howard
- Dermot Walsh as Jerome Thorn
- Denis O'Dea as Sir William Godgrey
- Edward Lexy as Lord Rochford
- Therese Giehse as Sister Seraphine
- Maureen Delany as Daisy Cobb
- Helen Cherry as Mary
- Vida Hope as Jennie
- Dora Sevening as Mme. Bonheur
- Janet Kay as Sylvia
- James Hayter as Dr. White
- Helen Goss as Lizzie Burt
- Beryl Measor as Nurse Brand
- Andrew Cruickshank as Sir Jonathon Dockwra
- Marjorie Gresley as Lady Rochford
- May MacDonald as Mrs. White
- Susan English as Sally Howard
- John Warren as Mr. Wilkins
- Rose Howlett as Mrs. Wilkins
- Miles Malleson as Mr. Burden
- William Mervyn as Mr. Bonnington
- Noel Howlett as Judge
- Arthur Howard as Clerk of the Court
- Hope Matthews as Foreman of the Jury
- Olwen Brookes as Mrs. Fisher
- Johnnie Schofield as chemist
- Sydney Bromley as Martin
- Fred Johnson as prison chaplain
- Albert Ferber as pianist
- John Hollingsworth as conductor
- George Opoka as M. Vernier
- Jacqueline Robert as Madame Vernier
- Tony Etienne as Jean
- Willoughby Gray as photographer
- Adrian Waller as reporter
- James B. Carson as reporter
- Mary Daniels as first programme seller
- Jean Bowler as second programme seller
- Wensley Pithey as opera house attendant
- Michael Logan as Police Inspector
- Nora Gordon as guard
- Christiana Forbes as guard
- Colleen Nolan as guard
- Sheila Raynor as guard
- Jean Anderson as extra
- Corey Ellison as extra
- Ian Wilson as extra

== Production ==
It was made at Denham Studios with sets designed by the art director Alex Vetchinsky.

== Critical reception ==
The Monthly Film Bulletin wrote: "'This is a gloomy production, which induces little interest or belief. Once again the theme is murder, and it has not even the entertainment value of being an exciting one. Eric Portman is quite good as the vain egoist, Richard; Sally Gray is not very interesting as Sarah; and Patrick Holt is not happy as the boorish John."

Kine Weekly wrote: "Tin-pot triangle melodrama. Played against phoney late nineteenth-century Manchester backgrounds, it tells, as far as we could gather, of the machinations of a ranting megalomaniac, but fails completely to make its point, if any, clear. 'Ham' acting, stilted dialogue and erratic direction accentuate every flaw in its vague and stagey script."

In British Sound Films: The Studio Years 1928–1959 David Quinlan rated the film as "mediocre", writing: "Fashionable gloom and doom."

Britmovie wrote, "... the story never catches fire, one reason for this is the heavy-handed direction of Brian Desmond Hurst which fails to maintain adequate suspense. Dermot Walsh and Patrick Holt overplay their roles and both were a promise never really to be fulfilled, but Eric Portman dominates the film in a barnstorming acting performance. Sally Gray is somewhat inconsequential and there's no spark of chemistry between the leads."

Film critic Allan Essler Smith wrote, "This powerful drama is an interesting example of a strand of late 1940s British cinema, but has been long neglected and not shown on British TV for many years, if at all. Set in the late Victorian and early Edwardian eras, it has excellent period detail and the sets effectively highlight Sarah's alienation and despair in the Howards's suffocating and gloomy household."

== Box office ==
Producer's receipts were £70,000 in the UK and £5,800 overseas. According to Rank's own records the film had made a loss of £77,800 for the company by December 1949.
