= General Crack =

1929 film

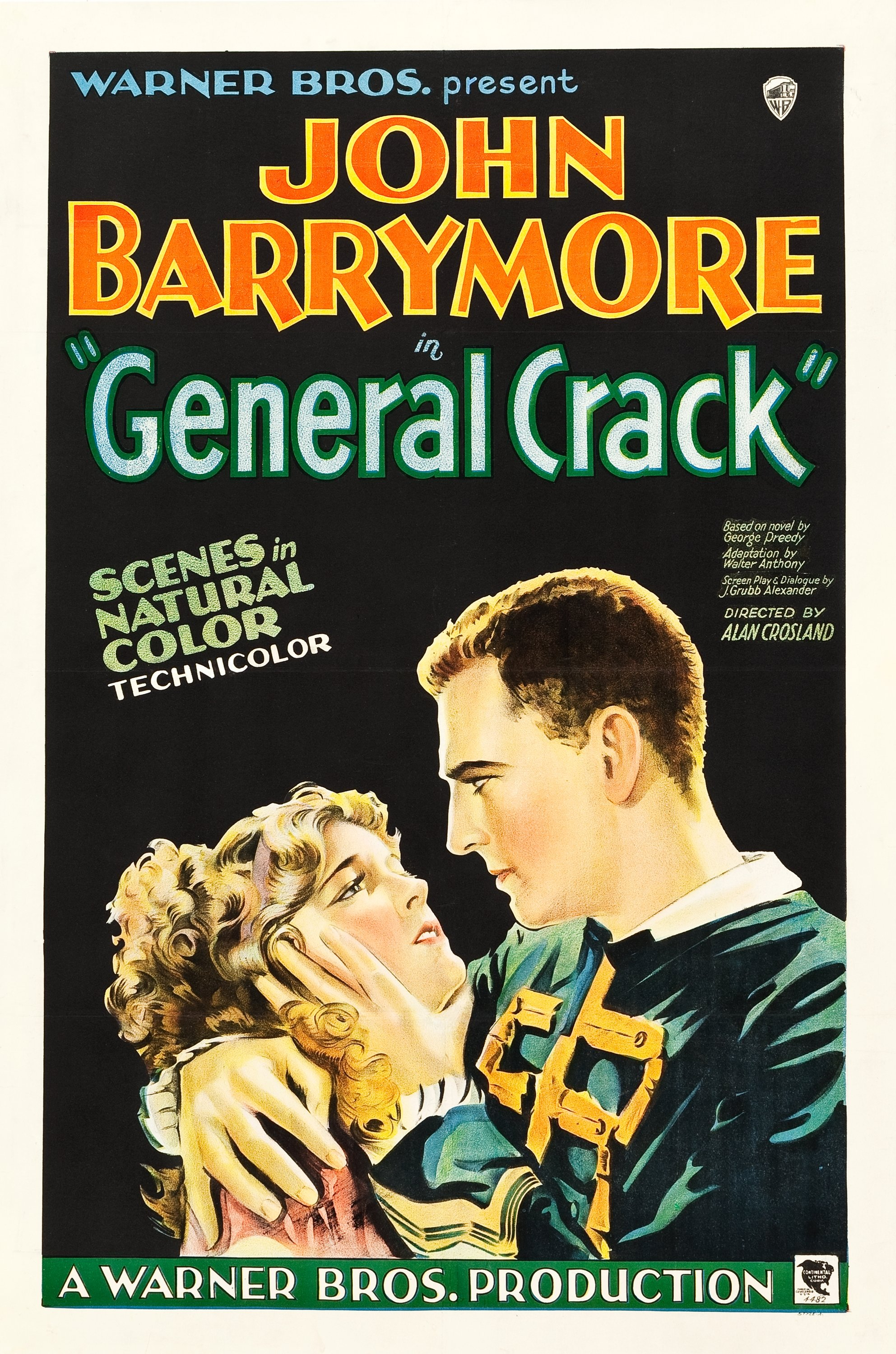
- Directed by: Alan Crosland
- Written by: J. Grubb Alexander (scenario & dialogue); Walter Anthony (adaptation)
- Based on: General Crack by George R. Preedy
- Produced by: Ned Marin
- Starring: John Barrymore
- Cinematography: Tony Gaudio (Technicolor)
- Edited by: Harold McLernon
- Music by: Rex Dunn
- Production company: Warner Bros. Pictures
- Distributed by: Warner Bros. Pictures
- Release dates: December 3, 1929 (NYC & LA); January 25, 1930 (US)
- Running time: 97 minutes
- Country: United States
- Languages: Sound (All-Talking); English
- Budget: $801,000
- Box office: $1,320,000

General Crack is a 1929 American pre-Code sound all-talking historical costume melodrama with Technicolor sequences which was directed by Alan Crosland and produced and distributed by Warner Bros. Pictures. It was filmed and premiered in 1929, and released early in 1930. It stars John Barrymore in his first full-length talking feature. The film would prove to be Crosland and Barrymore's last historical epic together. It was based on the 1928 novel General Crack by the British writer Marjorie Bowen, published under the name George Preedy, one of her several pen names. The final court sequence was originally in Technicolor and proved to be Barrymore's last appearance in color.

== Plot ==
Prologue – Kurland, 1720

At a grand banquet in the ducal palace of Kurland, the aging and battle-worn Duke of Kurland laments his lack of an heir. Just as his officers bemoan the end of their martial legacy, a ragged boy interrupts the feast, presenting a letter naming him as the Duke's illegitimate son—Christian, born of the gypsy princess Nina, who has recently died. Overjoyed, the old duke claims the boy and names him his rightful heir.

The Story – 20 Years Later

Now a soldier of fortune, Prince Christian Rudolph Augustus Christopher Detlar, known across Europe as General Crack (John Barrymore), has lost his inheritance to the Russians. Offering his sword to the highest bidder, when war looms Emperor Leopold II (Lowell Sherman) reluctantly agrees to hire him.

Crack agrees—for half the gold in Austria and the hand of Archduchess Maria Luisa (Marian Nixon), whom he believes to be an unattractive royal pawn. With a three-day deadline, the Emperor accepts the terms.

On his way to Vienna, Crack stops at a roadside gypsy camp, where he is enthralled by a fiery dancer, Fidelia (Armida). Swept away by passion and his own gypsy heritage, Crack impulsively weds her in a tribal ceremony and brings her to court.

To his astonishment, he finds that Maria Luisa is beautiful and gracious—but his loyalty now lies with Fidelia, whom he presents at court. Leopold, instantly smitten with Fidelia, begins wooing her behind Crack's back. During a court ball, while Crack dances with Maria Luisa, Leopold seduces Fidelia on a palace balcony. The crippled and treacherous Col. Gabor (Otto Matieson), jealous and watching, attempts to force himself on Fidelia, but Crack intervenes violently and banishes Gabor.

Crack leaves for the front, entrusting Fidelia and the precious Kurland diamonds to his new bride. But in his absence, Leopold, disguised, returns to Fidelia's rooms and seduces her. Gabor spies on them and later blackmails Fidelia, stealing the diamonds as proof of her infidelity.

Gabor travels to Crack's war camp and reveals the affair, showing the diamonds. Crack, devastated, orders Gabor shot at dawn. When Leopold visits the camp to discuss strategy, Crack—filled with rage—forces him to personally authorize the execution, further unnerving the emperor.

With the war won, Crack returns to Vienna. Furious, he publicly denounces Fidelia and hands her over to the gypsies for punishment. At the Emperor's coronation as Elector of Bavaria, Crack storms out of the cathedral, and his regiments—loyal to him—follow. Leopold is left without an army.

Crack captures Leopold and Maria Luisa, intent on avenging himself by dishonoring the Archduchess as Leopold did Fidelia. But Maria's genuine love for Crack softens him. Moved, he releases both, now unable to carry out his revenge.

Crack seizes his ancestral castle in Kurland with a small force, only to find Austrian and Russian troops approaching. Leading the force is none other than Maria Luisa, accompanied by loyal Count Hensdorff (Hobart Bosworth). Rather than demand his defeat, they offer him terms: surrender half the Kurland crown jewels and marry Maria Luisa, now Archduchess of Kurland. Crack smiles and accepts.

In the final sequence (which was photographed in Technicolor) Crack joins Maria Luisa hand-in-hand as they ascend to the throne—his gypsy fire finally tempered by love and destiny fulfilled.

== Cast ==
- John Barrymore as Duke of Kurland / Prince Christian
- Philippe De Lacy as Young Christian
- Lowell Sherman as Leopold II
- Marian Nixon as Archduchess Maria Luisa
- Armida as Fidelia
- Hobart Bosworth as Count Hensdorff
- Jacqueline Logan as Countess Carola
- Otto Matieson as Col. Gabor
- Andrés de Segurola as Col. Pons
- Douglas Gerrard as Capt. Sweeney
- Wilhelm von Brincken as Capt. Schmidt (credited as William von Brincken)
- General Lodijensky as Capt Banning (credited as Theodore Lodi)
- Nick Thompson as Typsy Chieftain
- Curt Rehfeld as Lt. Dennis
- Julanne Johnston as Court Lady
- Guy Schact as Pietro
- Carrie Daumery as Madame Frump (credited as Madame Daumery)

== Box office ==
According to Warner Bros records the film earned $919,000 domestic and $401,000 foreign.

== Preservation ==
The visual (i.e., film) portions of the sound version of General Crack are lost although the soundtrack survives complete on a set of the Vitaphone discs at UCLA. The silent version of this film, with Czech intertitles, survives, but does not have any of the original color sequences. Copies are located in the Czech archive and the Museum of Modern Art. Although the complete soundtrack for the sound version survives on Vitaphone disks, the silent version was either a "B" negative or an alternate take with intertitles. So while this is a legitimate version of the film, it does not match up with the Vitaphone soundtrack.

== See also ==
- List of early color feature films
- List of early sound feature films (1926–1929)
- List of incomplete or partially lost films
