= Death in the Hand =

1948 British film by A . Barr-Smith

- Directed by: A. Barr-Smith
- Written by: Max Beerbohm (story), Douglas Cleverdon (adaptation)
- Cinematography: Jo Jago; George Noble
- Edited by: Bunch Dixon-Spain
- Music by: Albert Ferber
- Distributed by: General Film Distributors (U.K.)
- Release date: 13 February 1948 (London)
- Running time: 43 minutes
- Country: UK
- Language: English

Death in the Hand is a 1948 British short mystery film directed by A. Barr-Smith, starring Esme Percy, Ernest Jay and Cecile Chevreau. It was made by the small independent company Vandyke Productions.

== Plot ==
In a seaside guest house, a nervous piano player, Cosmo Vaughan (Esme Percy), tells a tale of how he read the palms of passengers on board a train and forecast their deaths. But is Mr Vaughan quite what he appears?

== Cast ==
- Esme Percy as Cosmo Vaughan
- Ernest Jay as MacRae
- Cecile Chevreau as Sylvia Mottram
- Carleton Hobbs as Chairman
- John Le Mesurier as Jack Mottram
- Shelagh Fraser as Penelope MacRae
- J. Hubert Leslie as Waiter
- Nuna Davey as Countrywoman
- Norman Shelley as Businessman
- Wilfrid Caithness as Rowlandson
- Thea Wells as Mrs Rowlandson
