= Sophie Dawes, Baronne de Feuchères =

British courtesan

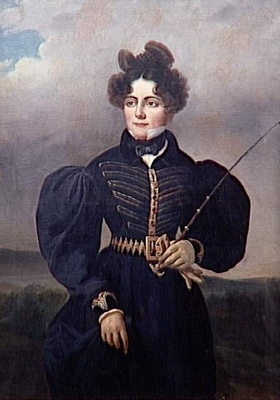
Portrait of Sophie Dawes, Baronne de Feuchères, by Alexis Leon Louis Valbrun

Sophie Dawes (29 September 1790 – 15 December 1840), Baroness de Feuchères by marriage, was an Anglo-French adventuress, born at St Helens, Isle of Wight, in 1790, the daughter of a drunken fisherman named Dawes. After working as a maid she became the English mistress of Louis Henry II, Prince of Condé.

== Early life ==
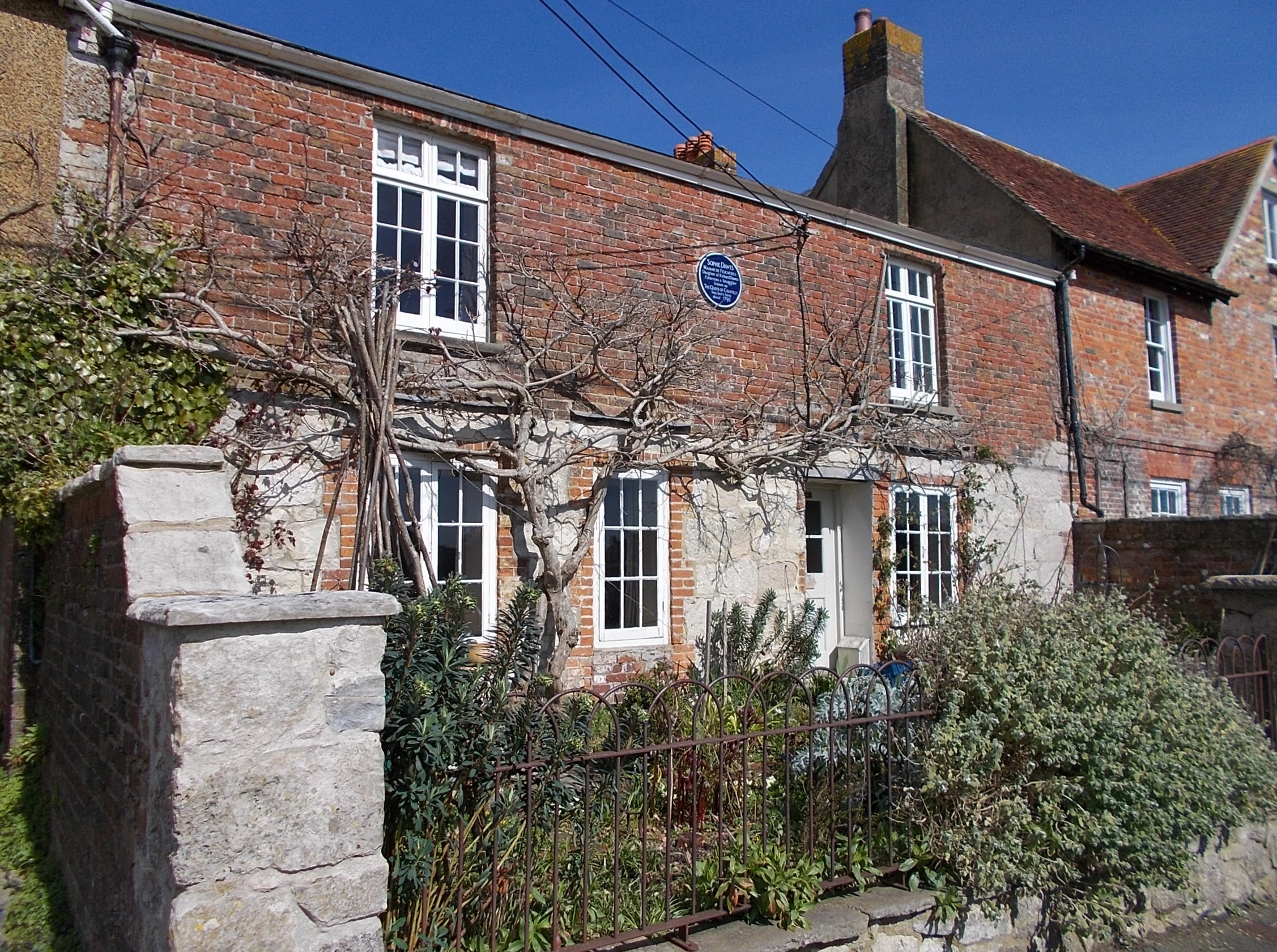
Birthplace of Sophie Dawes at St Helens, Isle of Wight

Dawes was born in 1790 at St Helens, Isle of Wight, the daughter of a fisherman named Richard Daw (or Dawes) by Jane Callaway, who were married in 1775 at St Helens Church. A blue plaque at her birthplace reads:

Sophie Dawes
Madame de Feuchères
Daughter of Richard Dawes
Fisherman & Smuggler
known as
The Queen of Chantilly

was born here
in 1792

Dawes was one of ten children, of whom only four grew up. In 1796 the whole family moved into the workhouse at Newport, where Dawes remained for nine years. After a short period of employment with a local farmer, she worked as a chambermaid in Portsmouth, then went to London, where she was seduced and fell into great poverty. An army officer took her as his mistress, and when they split up he settled an annuity of £50 a year on her. She sold this and in 1809 placed herself at a school in Chelsea.

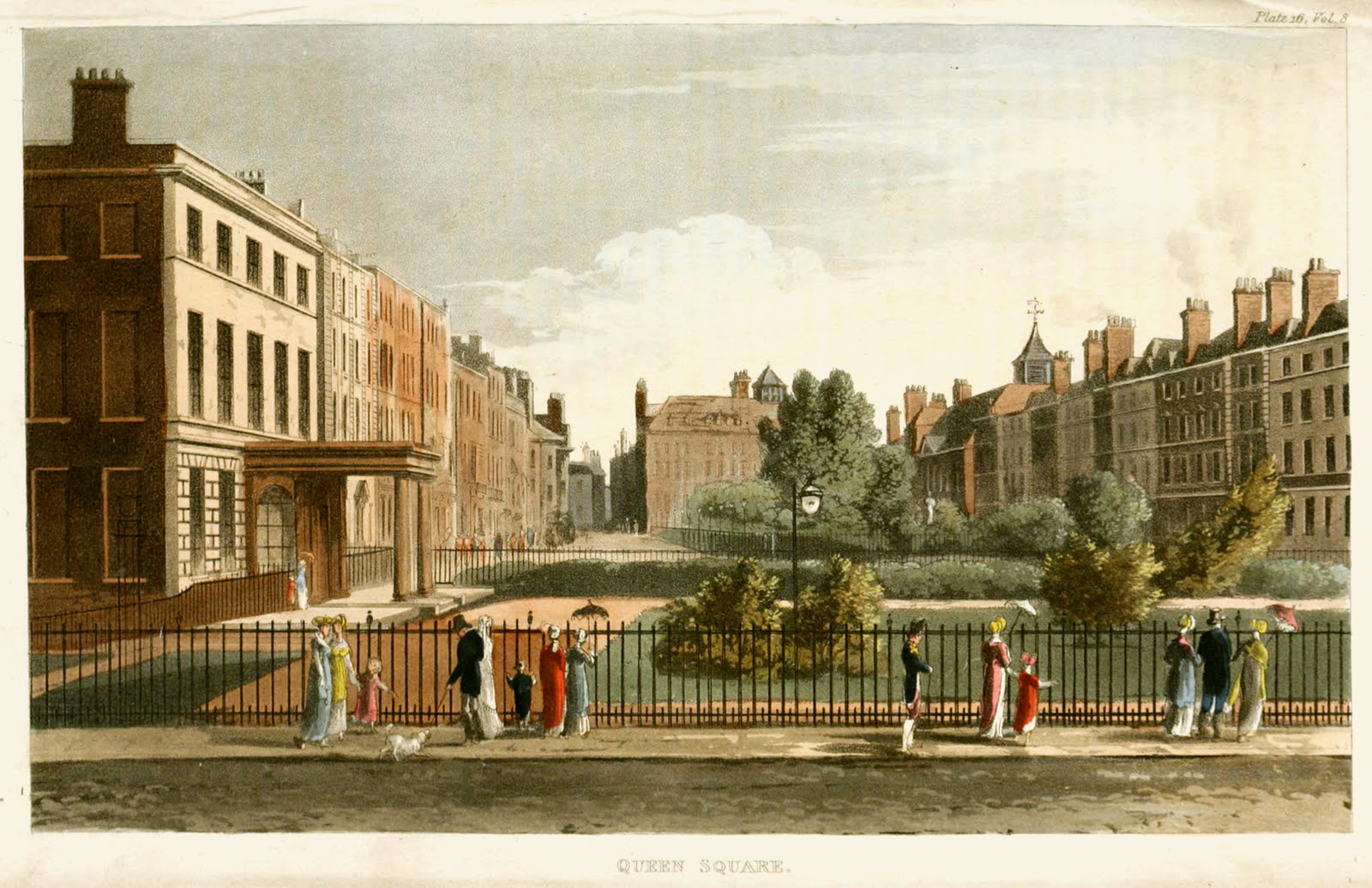
Queen Square, Bloomsbury, in 1812

Dawes later worked as a servant in a high-class brothel in Piccadilly, where the valet of the exiled Duke of Bourbon, afterwards Louis Henri, Prince of Condé, pointed her out to his master. In 1811, the duke took a house for her and her mother in Gloucester Street, off Queen Square, Bloomsbury, and she became his mistress. There she pursued her studies, learning modern languages and reading Xenophon and Plutarch in Greek, as later shown by her surviving exercise books.

== Career ==
Condé took Dawes to Paris after the fall of Napoleon. To prevent scandal and to qualify her to be received at court, in 1818 he had her married to Adrien Victor de Feuchères, a lieutenant-colonel commanding the 6th Infantry Regiment of the Royal Guards. By a license dated 25 July 1818, they were married on 6 August 1818 at St Martin-in-the-Fields, Westminster (Church of England), and also in a Roman Catholic ceremony in Paris on 26 August 1818, and the duke settled 72,000 francs on them. As the parish register at St Helen's had no record of her baptism, Sophia had received adult baptism in 1817, when she reduced her age by three years. For her marriage licence she described herself as a widow, and in her marriage contract she said she was the daughter of a Richard Clark and the widow of a William Dawes. All these inventions later gave her heirs much trouble.

As well as providing Sophia with a dowry, the Duke made her husband his aide-de-camp and a baron. The new baroness, pretty and clever, became a person of consequence at the court of Louis XVIII. However, Feuchères finally discovered the true relationship between his wife and Condé, whom he had been assured was her father, and left her, obtaining legal recognition of their separation in 1827. On hearing of the scandal, the king banished Dawes from his court, declaring her "naught more than a commoner street-wench yet tragically bereft of any skills of the trade." Thanks to her influence, however, Condé was induced in 1829 to sign a will bequeathing the bulk of his estate—worth more than sixty-six millions—to the Duke of Aumale, fourth son of Louis Philippe d'Orléans, and 2,000,000 francs, free of death-duty, were to go to the Prince's “faithful companion, Mme la baronne de Feucheres”, as well as the chateaux and estates of Boissy, Enghien, Montmorency, Mortefontaine, and Saint-Leu-Taverny, the pavilion in the Palais-Bourbon, and the Prince's furniture, carriages, and horses. She was also to get the Château d'Écouen, so long as she allowed it to be used as an orphanage for the descendants of soldiers who had served with the armies of Condé and in the War in the Vendée.

Again Dawes was in high favour. Charles X received her at court, Talleyrand visited her, her niece married a marquis Hugues de Chabannes La Palice, and her nephew was made a baron. Condé, wearied by his mistress's importunities, and depressed after the July Revolution and the subsequent exile of the King, made up his mind to leave France secretly. When on 27 August 1830 he was found hanging dead from his window, the baroness was suspected and an inquiry was held. But the evidence of death being the result of any crime appearing insufficient, she was not prosecuted. There were rumours that the new King of the French, Louis-Philippe I, had collaborated with Sophie in the crime. Later, rumours circulated amongst the French nobility that Condé had died in the course of what would later be known as erotic asphyxiation.

Hated as she was by the French, the baroness returned to England, where she died in December 1840. At the time of her death she was living at 189, Cumberland Street, Westminster, and on 22 December she was buried in Kensal Green Cemetery under the name Sophia Dawes Baroness de Feuchères de Charlepont. Her age at death was stated as fifty.

== Legacy ==
In 1934, the story of her life was told in the book The Scandal of Sophie Dawes by Marjorie Bowen.
