= For Her to See =

1947 novel

- Author: Marjorie Bowen
- Genre: Historical crime
- Publisher: Hutchinson; Harper and Brothers
- Publication date: 1947
- Publication place: United Kingdom
- Media type: Print

For Her to See is a 1947 historical mystery crime novel by the British author Marjorie Bowen, writing under the pseudonym of Joseph Shearing. It was inspired by the unsolved murder of Charles Bravo in 1876. It was published in London by Hutchinson. The American version was published by Harper under the alternative title So Evil My Love.

== Adaptation ==
In 1948 it was adapted into the British film So Evil My Love directed by Lewis Allen and starring Ray Milland, Ann Todd and Geraldine Fitzgerald. It was one of four adaptations of Bowen's novels made in 1947–48 when film noir was at its height.

== Bibliography ==
- Geoff Mayer & Brian McDonnell. Encyclopedia of Film Noir. ABC-CLIO, 2007.
- Tibbetts, John C. The Furies of Marjorie Bowen. McFarland, 2019.
