= Airing in a Closed Carriage =

1943 novel

- 1943 first edition
- Author: Marjorie Bowen
- Genre: Historical drama
- Publisher: Harper and Brothers
- Publication date: 1943
- Publication place: United Kingdom
- Media type: Print
- Pages: 358

Airing in a Closed Carriage is a 1943 British historical novel written by Marjorie Bowen under the pseudonym of Joseph Shearing. Two brothers develop a fierce rivalry over the same woman. It was inspired by the real life murder trial of Florence Maybrick.

== Film adaptation ==
In 1947 the novel was turned into a British film The Mark of Cain directed by Brian Desmond Hurst and starring Eric Portman and Sally Gray. It was one of four adaptations of Bowen's novels made in 1947–48.

== Bibliography ==
- Geoff Mayer & Brian McDonnell. Encyclopedia of Film Noir. ABC-CLIO, 2007.
