= Dickon (novel) =

1929 novel by Marjorie Bowen

- 1971 paperback edition
- Author: Marjorie Bowen
- Language: English
- Genre: Novel
- Publisher: Hodder & Stoughton
- Publication date: 1929
- Publication place: United Kingdom
- Media type: Print (Hardback & Paperback)
- Pages: 320 p. (hardback edition)

Dickon is a 1929 novel by Marjorie Bowen about King Richard III of England. It was one of many historical fiction works she wrote.

== Plot summary ==
The book follows the life of Richard III, the last Plantagenet king of England. Born in 1452 to Richard Plantagenet, 3rd Duke of York and Cecily Neville, Richard was the eighth and youngest of the couple's children. The story begins in 1460, just after Richard's father, elder brother Edmund, Earl of Rutland and uncle Richard Neville, 5th Earl of Salisbury are killed at the Battle of Wakefield. Richard and his brother George, Duke of Clarence are hurried away to the Duchy of Burgundy. At this point a recurring character named Jon Fogge is introduced, who acts as a bogeyman and looming threat throughout the book. A character by the same name and who must be assumed to be the same, is Richard's last attendant after his defeat and death at the Battle of Bosworth. As a historical character, Sir John Fogge was an early supporter of Edward IV, who later switched his allegiance to Henry VII and apparently did fight against Richard at Bosworth. Fogge later married into the family of Katherine Haute, who was possibly the mother of Richard's illegitimate daughter Katherine.

The book is divided into three sections, covering the years of Richard's youth (1460–1466), his young adulthood serving his brother Edward IV (1470–1472) when the Warwick-Clarence rebellion occurred and the period encompassing Edward's death and Richard's own brief reign from 1482 to his death at the Battle of Bosworth Field in 1485. Although much is omitted from Richard's life, such as his life in exile as a child when he and his brother lodged with the printer William Caxton, the details of his wardship under his cousin Richard Neville, 16th Earl of Warwick, and Richard's military and administrative exploits on the Scottish border, the author includes what she sees as the major events of his life - the violent death of his father, the conquering kingship of his brother Edward, the secret marriage to Elizabeth Woodville that nearly costs Edward his throne, the final triumph of Edward, the King's sudden death and Richard's own shock to discover that his brother's marriage was not legal, his own elevation to the throne of England, the tragic deaths of his wife and son and finally his betrayal and death at Bosworth.

It seems that Bowen believes that Richard was completely unconnected with the mysterious disappearances of the Princes in the Tower for unlike some other fictional treatments, such as Michael Tyler-Whittle's Richard III, The Last Plantagenet, the episode is never even referred to in the book. In fact, the two princes are still presumably alive when Richard meets his own death.

Richard himself is the major character and the book's events are viewed through his eyes. There is little examination of other characters other than through Richard's own analysis, but that analysis is surprisingly sympathetic - although completely loyal to Edward, Richard is clearly able to see others' points of view as well. Throughout he is depicted as a sensitive, loyal and honorable man, a fierce and skilled - albeit sometimes reluctant - warrior and a loving family man, though constantly haunted by the violent events in his past. He is convinced throughout the book that he is followed by the Devil - a belief that appears to be justified at the very end by the Fogge character, while watching the defeated King's corpse being brought to the abbey. 'Sir, one of Sir William Stanley's men,' replied the knight, still smiling, but with a look which made the Tudor followers draw away from him, 'and many deeds have I done against Richard Plantagenet, and now I have my reward.'

== Literary significance and criticism ==
Dickon is one of several fictional treatments of the last Plantagenet king wherein the author argued for his innocence in the murder of his nephews and presented him as a good man and potentially a very good king.

=== Works with similar themes ===
Other authors and historians who wrote defenses - both fictional and historical - of Richard included Horace Walpole, Josephine Tey, and Thomas Costain.

- Valerie Anand, another popular writer, wrote a novel, Crown of Roses (1989), in which Richard III is presented as innocent of the murder of the Princes.
- Michael Tyler-Whittle wrote Richard III, The Last Plantagenet (1970), which also presents Richard as innocent of the Princes' murder, although Tyler-Whittle makes one of his attendants guilty.
- Elizabeth George wrote the short story collection around the theme in I, Richard.
- Barbara Mertz, writing as Elizabeth Peters, wrote the murder mystery The Murders of Richard III, set amongst the members of a modern Ricardian society.
- In Sharon Kay Penman's "The Sunne in Splendour"., one of Richard's stooges, the Duke of Buckingham, is presented as the murderer of the princes rather than Richard.
- Thomas Costain wrote a narrative historical series in the 1950s and 1960s about the Plantagenets. The volume that included the short reign of Richard was entitled The Last Plantagenets.
