= General Crack (novel) =

1928 novel

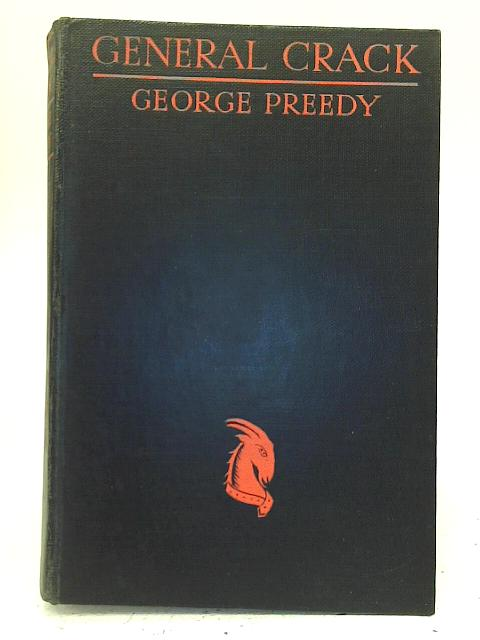
- Author: Marjorie Bowen
- Language: English
- Genre: War
- Publisher: The Bodley Head
- Publication date: 1928
- Publication place: United Kingdom
- Media type: Print

General Crack is a 1928 historical novel by the British writer Marjorie Bowen, written under her pen name of George Preedy.

== Film adaptation ==
In 1929, it was adapted into a Hollywood film of the same title directed by Alan Crosland. Produced as an early talkie during the conversion from silent film it starred John Barrymore, Lowell Sherman and Marian Nixon.

== Bibliography ==
- Goble, Alan. The Complete Index to Literary Sources in Film. Walter de Gruyter, 1999.
- Tibbetts, John C. The Furies of Marjorie Bowen. McFarland, 2019.
