= The Poisoners (Bowen novel) =

1936 novel

- 1953 Beagle Books edition
- Author: Marjorie Bowen
- Language: English
- Genre: Historical mystery
- Publisher: Hutchinson
- Publication date: 1936
- Publication place: United Kingdom
- Media type: Print

The Poisoners is a 1936 historical mystery novel by the British writer Marjorie Bowen, written under the pen name of George Preedy. It is based on the Affair of the Poisons, during the reign of Louis XIV in seventeenth-century France.

== Bibliography ==
- Vinson, James. Twentieth-Century Romance and Gothic Writers. Macmillan, 1982.
