= Marjorie Bowen =

British writer (1885–1952)

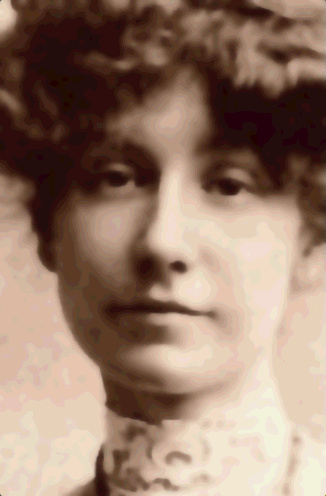
- Born: Margaret Gabrielle Vere Campbell; 1 November 1885; Hayling Island, Hampshire, England
- Died: 23 December 1952 (aged 67); Kensington, London, England
- Occupation: Writer
- Spouses: Zefferino Emilio Constanza (m. 1912; died 1916) Arthur L. Long (m. 1917)
- Children: 4
- Writing career
- Pen name: Marjorie Bowen; Joseph Shearing; George Preedy; Robert Paye; John Winch
- Genre: Romance

Margaret Gabrielle Vere Long (née Campbell; 1 November 1885 – 23 December 1952), who used the pseudonyms Marjorie Bowen, George R. Preedy, Joseph Shearing, Robert Paye, John Winch, and Margaret Campbell or Mrs. Vere Campbell, was a British author who wrote historical romances and supernatural horror stories, as well as works of popular history and biography.

== Life ==
Bowen was born in 1885 on Hayling Island in Hampshire. Her alcoholic father Vere Douglas Campbell left the family when Bowen was young and was eventually found dead on a London street. She and her sister grew up in poverty, and their mother was reportedly unaffectionate. Bowen studied at the Slade School of Fine Art and later in Paris. At the age of 16, Bowen wrote her first work of fiction, a violent historical novel set in medieval Italy titled The Viper of Milan. The book was rejected by several publishers, who considered it inappropriate for a young woman to have written such a novel. It went on to become a best-seller when eventually published. After this, Bowen's prolific writings were the chief financial support for her family.

Bowen became a vegetarian after witnessing animals being butchered at street markets. She purchased market animals to free them. She was married twice: first, from 1912 to 1916, to a Sicilian, Zefferino Emilio Constanza, who died of tuberculosis, and then to Arthur L. Long. Bowen had four children; a son and a daughter (who died in infancy) with Constanza, and two sons with Long. Her son with Costanza was Michael Magnus Vere Custance CB who went on to be Deputy Secretary for the Ministry of Transport and Civil Aviation. Her son with Long, Athelstan Charles Ethelwulf Long, was a colonial administrator.

In 1938, Bowen signed a petition organised by the National Peace Council, calling for an international peace conference in an effort to avert war in Europe.

In an interview for Twentieth Century Authors, she listed her hobbies as "painting, needlework and reading". Her cousin was the artist Nora Molly Campbell (1888–1971). Bowen died on 23 December 1952 at the St Charles Hospital in Kensington, London after suffering a serious concussion as a result of a fall in her bedroom.

== Work ==
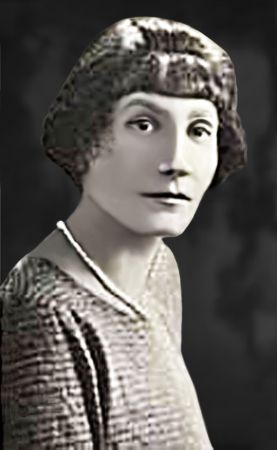
Marjorie Bowen, around 1930

Bowen wrote more than 150 books, with the majority being published under the pseudonym "Marjorie Bowen". She also wrote under the names Joseph Shearing, George R. Preedy, John Winch, Robert Paye and Margaret Campbell. After publishing The Viper of Milan (1906), she produced a steady stream of writings until her death. Under her own name, Bowen primarily published historical novels, including a trilogy about King William III: I Will Maintain (1910), Defender of the Faith (1911), and God and the King (1911). Her 1909 novel Black Magic is a Gothic horror novel about a medieval witch. Bowen also wrote non-fiction history books aimed at a popular readership.

Under the pseudonym "Joseph Shearing", Bowen wrote several mystery novels inspired by real crimes. For instance, For Her to See (1947, a.k.a. So Evil My Love) is a fictionalised version of the Charles Bravo murder. The Shearing novels were especially popular in the United States, with Moss Rose, The Golden Violet and Forget-Me-Not achieving both critical and commercial success, being championed by reviewers such as Phil Stong. Until the late 1940s, the identity of Shearing was not known to the general public, and some speculated it was the pseudonym of F. Tennyson Jesse.

Under the "George R. Preedy" pseudonym, Bowen wrote two non-supernatural horror novels, Dr. Chaos and The Devil Snar'd. Her last, posthumous, novel was The Man with the Scales (1954), about a man obsessed with revenge, and contains supernatural elements reminiscent of the works of E. T. A. Hoffmann. Many of these stories were published as Berkley Medallion Books. Several of her books were adapted as films.

Bowen's supernatural short fiction was gathered in three collections: The Last Bouquet (1933), The Bishop of Hell (1949) (featuring an introduction by Michael Sadleir) and the posthumous Kecksies, edited for Arkham House in the late 1940s, but not published until 1976.

== Critical reception ==
Bowen's books are much sought after by aficionados of gothic horror and received praise from critics. Graham Greene stated in his Paris Review interview (Autumn 1953), "I chose Marjorie Bowen [as a major influence] because as I have told you, I don't think that the books that one reads as an adult influence one as a writer... But books such as Marjorie Bowen's, read at a young age, do influence one considerably." Horror reviewer Robert Hadji described Bowen as "one of the great supernatural writers of this century". Fritz Leiber referred to "Marjorie Bowen's brilliant Black Magic". Jessica Amanda Salmonson, discussing The Last Bouquet, described Bowen's prose as "stylish and moody, dramatic to the highest degree" and stated "what in other hands is merely tacky or gross is, from Marjorie Bowen, a superior art, chilling and seductive".

Sally Benson in The New Yorker, discussing the "Joseph Shearing" books, wrote, "Mr Shearing is a painstaking researcher, a superb writer, a careful technician, and a master of horror. There is no one else quite like him." Reviewing The Crime of Laura Sarelle Will Cuppy stated, "Those who want a good workout of the more perilous emotions will do well to read Mr. Shearing's impressive tale of love, death and doom.... Join the Shearing cult and meet one of the most malevolent females in song or story." In an article about women writers, the Australian newspaper The Courier-Mail described Bowen as "one of the best of our modern novelists." Sheldon Jaffery stated that Bowen's "weird fiction ranks favorably with such distaff portrayers of the supernatural as Mary Wilkins-Freeman, Edith Wharton and Lady Cynthia Asquith."

By contrast, Colin Wilson criticized Bowen as a writer of "bad adventure stories" in a review of A Sort of Life by Graham Greene.

== Adaptations ==
- Writing as Marjorie Bowen, her 1926 novel Mistress Nell Gwyn was made into a film Nell Gwyn the same year directed by Herbert Wilcox and starring Dorothy Gish and Randle Ayrton.
- Writing as George Preedy, her 1928 novel, General Crack, was adapted as the film General Crack (1930), starring John Barrymore
- Writing as Joseph Shearing, her 1934 novel, Moss Rose, was adapted as the film Moss Rose (1947)
- Writing as Joseph Shearing her 1939 novel, Blanche Fury was adapted as the film Blanche Fury (1948)
- Writing as Marjorie Bowen, her 1943 novel Airing in a Closed Carriage was adapted as the film The Mark of Cain (1947)
- Writing as Joseph Shearing, her 1947 novel So Evil My Love was adapted as the film So Evil My Love (1948)

== Works ==
=== As Marjorie Bowen ===
- The Viper of Milan (1906)
- The Master of Stair (1907), published in the US as The Glen o' Weeping
- The Sword Decides (1908)
- A Moment's Madness (1908)
- The Leopard and the Lily (1909)
- Black Magic: a Tale of the Rise and Fall of the Antichrist (1909)
- I Will Maintain (1910, revised 1943)
- God and the King (1911)
- Defender of the Faith (1911)
- God's Playthings (1912)
- Lover's Knots (1912)
- The Rake's Progress (1912)
- The Quest of Glory (1912)
- The Governor of England (1913)
- A Knight of Spain (1913)
- The Two Carnations (1913)
- Prince and Heretic (1914)
- Because of These Things (1915)
- Mr Washington (1915), published in the US as The Soldier from Virginia
- The Carnival of Florence (1915)
- Shadows of Yesterday (1916) – short stories
- William, by Grace of God (1916)
- Curious Happenings (1917) – short stories
- The Third Estate (1917); revised edition, Eugenie (1971)
- Kings-at-Arms (1918)
- The Burning Glass (1918)
- Crimes of Old London (1919) – short stories
- Mr Misfortunate (1919)
- The Cheats, A Romantic Fantasy (1920)
- The Pleasant Husband and other stories (1921)
- Roccoco (1921)
- The Haunted Vintage (1921)
- The Jest, from "La Cena delle beffe" by Sem Benelli, translated and adapted into novel form by Bowen (1922)
- Affairs of Men, selections from Bowen's novels (1922)
- Stinging Nettles (1923) – a semi-autobiographical novel relating to Bowen's doomed marriage to Zefferino
- Seeing Life! and Other Stories (1923)
- The Presence and the Power: A Story of Three Generations (1924)
- Five People (1925)
- "Luctor et Emergo": being an historical essay on the state of England at the Peace of Ryswyck, 1697 – history (1926)
- Boundless Water (1926)
- The Seven Deadly Sins: Tales (1926)
- Mistress Nell Gwyn, published in the UK as Nell Gwyn: A Decoration (1926)
- The Netherlands Display'd – non-fiction
- "Five Winds" (1927)
- The Pagoda (1927)
- Dark Ann (1927) – short stories
- Exits and Farewells (1928)
- The Golden Roof (1928)
- The Story of the Temple and its Associations (1928)
- The Countess Fanny (1928)
- Holland (1928) – a tourist's guide to the Netherlands
- William, Prince of Orange (Afterwards king of England): being an account of his early life up to his twenty-fourth year (1928)
- Sundry Great Gentlemen (1928) – biographies
- The Winged Trees (1928)
- Sheep's Head and Babylon, and Other Stories of Yesterday and Today (1929) – short stories
- The Third Mary Stuart, Mary of York, Orange and England (1929)
- Dickon (1929)
- The Gorgeous Lovers and other Tales (1929)
- Mademoiselle Maria Gloria by Bowen, with The Saving of Castle Malcolm by Madeleine Nightingale (1929)
- The Lady's Prisoner by Bowen, with The Story of Mr. Bell by Geoffrey M. Boumphrey (1929)
- A Family Comedy (1840) (1930)
- Exits and Farewells: Being some account of the last days of certain historical characters (1930)
- The English Paragon (1930)
- Old Patch's Medley; or, a London miscellany (1930) – short stories
- The Question (1931)
- Brave Employments (1931)
- Withering Fires (1931) – mystery novel
- Grace Latouche and the Warringtons (1931) – short stories
- The Shadow on Mockways (1932) – a Grand Guignol melodrama
- Fond Fancy, and Other Stories (1932)
- Dark Rosaleen (1932; abridged as Lord Edward in Command, 1937)
- The Veil'd Delight (1933)
- Great Tales of Horror (1933) edited by Bowen
- The Last Bouquet, Some Twilight Tales (1933) – short stories
- I Dwelt in High Places (1933) – a novel based on the Elizabethan scientist John Dee's involvement with Edward Kelley
- The Stolen Bride (1933, abridged edition 1946)
- "Set with Green Herbs" (1933)
- The Triumphant Beast (1934)
- The Scandal of Sophie Dawes (1934) – about the low-born courtesan Sophie Dawes, Baronne de Feuchères, described by Bowen as a "vulgar wanton", "a young slut" and a "gutter rat"
- William III and the Revolution of 1688 (1934)
- Peter Porcupine: a study of William Cobbett, 1762–1835 (1935)
- Patriotic Lady. A study of Emma, Lady Hamilton, and the Neapolitan Revolution of 1799 (1935)
- More Great Tales of Horror (1935) edited by Bowen
- Mary Queen of Scots:Daughter of Debate (1936)
- William Hogarth (1936)
- Trumpets at Rome (1936)
- Crowns and Sceptres: the Romance and Pageantry of Coronations (1937)
- Worlds' Wonder and Other Essays (1937)
- Some Famous Love Letters (1937) edited by Bowen
- Wrestling Jacob. A study of the life of John Wesley and some members of the family. (1937)
- Royal Pageantry (1937)
- God and the Wedding Dress (1938)
- The Trumpet and the Swan: An Adventure of the Civil War (1938)
- A Giant in Chains: Prelude to Revolution: France 1775–1791 (1938)
- Mr. Tyler's Saints (1939)
- The Circle in the Water (1939)
- Ethics in Modern Art (1939)
- Exchange Royal (1940)
- Strangers to Freedom (1940) illustrated by Gina Dawson
- Today is Mine: The story of a gamble (1941)
- Airing in a Closed Carriage (1943) – adapted as the film The Mark of Cain (1947)
- The Church and Social Progress: An exposition of rationalism and reaction (1945)
- The Bishop of Hell and Other Stories (1949) – selected supernatural stories from her earlier output; reprinted in 2006 by Wordsworth Editions
- In the steps of Mary Queen of Scots (1952)
- The Man with the Scales (1954) – published posthumously
- Kecksies and Other Twilight Tales (1976) – short stories
  - "Preface"; "The Hidden Ape"; "Kecksies"; "Raw Material"; "The Avenging of Ann Leete"; "The Crown Derby Plate"; "The Sign-Painter and the Crystal Fishes"; "Scoured Silk"; "The Breakdown"; "One Remained Behind"; "The House by the Poppy Field"; "Florence Flannery"; "Half-Past Two"
- Gustavus Adolphus II (1594–1632): elected King of Sweden, of the Goths and Vandals (1988)
- Twilight and Other Supernatural Romances (1998) – published by Ash-Tree Press
  - Preface: "Marjorie Bowen 1885–1952: Some Random Recollections by One of Her Sons"; Introduction by Jessica Amanda Salmonson: "The Supernatural Romances of Marjorie Bowen"; "Dark Ann"; "The Last Bouquet"; "Madam Spitfire"; "The Lady Clodagh"; "Decay"; "The Fair Hair of Ambrosine'; "Ann Mellor's Lover"; "Giudetta's Wedding Night"; "Twilight"; "The Burning of the Vanities"; "A Stranger Knocked"; "They Found My Grave"; "Brent's Folly"; "The Confession of Beau Sekforde"; "The Recluse and Springtime"; "Vigil"; "Julia Roseingrave"; Author's Afterword: "A Ghostly Experience: The Presence of Evil"
- Collected Twilight Stories (2010) – published by Oxford City Press
  - "Scoured Silk"; "The Breakdown"; "One Remained Behind – A Romance a la Mode Gothique"; "The House by the Poppy Field"; "Half-Past Two"; "Elsie's Lonely Afternoon"; "The Extraordinary Adventure of Mr John Proudie"; "Ann Mellor's Lover"; "Florence Flannery"; "Kecksies"; "The Avenging of Ann Leete"; "The Bishop of Hell"; "The Crown Derby Plate"; "The Fair Hair of Ambrosine"; "The Housekeeper"; "Raw Material"; "The Hidden Ape"; "The Sign-Painter and the Crystal Fishes"

=== As Margaret Campbell or Mrs. Vere Campbell ===
- Ferriby (1907) (as Mrs. Vere Campbell)
- The Debate Continues: being the Autobiography of Marjorie Bowen (1939) (as Margaret Campbell)

=== As Robert Paye ===
- The Devil's Jig (1930)
- Julia Roseingrave (1933) – supernatural fiction involving witchcraft

=== As George R. Preedy ===
- General Crack (1928)
- Beltarbet's Pride (short story) (1929)
- The Rocklitz, published in the US as The Prince's Darling (1930)
- Bagatelle and some other Diversions – short Stories (1930)
- Captain Banner: a drama in three acts (1930)
- Tumult in the North 1930
- Passion Flower (1932), published in the US as Beneath the Passion Flower (1932)
- The Pavilion of Honour 1932
- Violante: Circe and Ermine 1932
- Double Dallilay, published in the US as Queen's Caprice (1933)
- Dr. Chaos and the Devil Snar'd (1933)
- The Knot Garden: Some Old Fancies Re-Set (1933)
- The Autobiography of Cornelius Blake, 1773–1810, of Ditton See, Cambridgeshire (1934)
- Laurell'd Captains (1935)
- The Poisoners (1936)
- My Tattered Loving (1937, reprinted in 1971 as The King's Favourite by MB)
- This Shining Woman: Mary Wollstonecraft Godwin (1937) – a biography of Mary Wollstonecraft
- Painted Angel (1938)
- Child of chequer'd fortune: The life, loves and battles of Maurice de Saxe, Marechal de France (1939) – non-fiction
- Dove in the Mulberry Tree (1939)
- The Fair Young Widow (1939)
- The Life of John Knox (1940)
- Primula' (1940)
- Man O' War: The Life of Rear Admiral John Paul Jones (1940)
- Black Man – White Maiden (1941)
- Findernes' Flowers (1941)
- The Courtly Charlatan (1942)
- Lyndley Waters (1942) published in the US as House of Sorrows (1977)
- Lady in a Veil (1943)
- The Fourth Chamber (1944)
- Nightcap and Plume (1945)
- No Way Home (1947)
- The Sacked City (1949)
- Julia Ballantyne (1952)

=== As Joseph Shearing ===
- Forget-me-Not (1932) published in the US as Lucile Clery (1930) and The Strange Cast of Lucile Clery (1942)
- Album Leaf (1933) published in the US as The Spider in the Cup (1934)
- Moss Rose (1934)
- The Angel of the Assassination (1935) – non-fiction (biography of Charlotte Corday)
- The Golden Violet. The story of a lady novelist (1936) reprinted as Night's Dark Secret by Margaret Campbell (1975)
- The Lady and the Arsenic: The life and death of a romantic: Marie Cappelle, Madam Lafarge (1937) – non-fiction
- Orange Blossoms (1938) – short stories
- Blanche Fury (1939)
- Aunt Beardie (1940)
- The Crime of Laura Sarelle (1941)
- The Spectral Bride also known as The Fetch (1942)
- Airing in a Closed Carriage (1943)
- The Abode of Love (1944)
- For Her to See (1947), published in the US as So Evil My Love (1947) – adapted as the film So Evil My Love (1948)
- Mignonette (1949)
- Within the Bubble (1950), published in the US as The Heiress of Frascati (1966)
- To Bed at Noon (1950)

=== As John Winch ===
- Idler's Gate (1932)

== Sources ==
- Bleiler, Everett (1948). The Checklist of Fantastic Literature. Chicago: Shasta Publishers. p. 57.
- Tuck, Donald H. (1974). The Encyclopedia of Science Fiction and Fantasy. Chicago: Advent. pp. 280–281. ISBN 0-911682-20-1.
