= The Viper of Milan =

1906 novel

- First edition (UK)
- Author: Marjorie Bowen
- Language: English
- Genre: Historical
- Publisher: Alston Rivers (London); McClure Phillips (United States)
- Publication date: 1906
- Publication place: United Kingdom
- Media type: Print

The Viper of Milan is a 1906 historical novel by the British writer Marjorie Bowen. Written when she was sixteen it received a number of rejections from publishers before its eventual publication. It proved a bestseller and launched her on a prolific career involving many popular successes. It is set in Renaissance Italy during the fourteenth century. It portrays the relentless rivalry between Gian Galeazzo Visconti, Duke of Milan and Mastino della Scala, a dispossessed ruler of Verona.

The New York Times said the novel was "a really magnificent story in itself and without any regard to its author's youth or maturity... [which] ends in unutterable gloom, with villainy completely victorious over virtue."

The Dundee Advertiser described the book as "... a tale of Old Italy, palpitating with life, in which love, war and adventure glow forth in every page, and which displays a thorough apprehension of the spirit of that remote time."

It was republished in 1960 with a foreword by Graham Greene.

== Bibliography ==
- Vinson, James. Twentieth-Century Romance and Gothic Writers. Macmillan, 1982.
