= Moss Rose (film) =

1947 film by Gregory Ratoff

- Theatrical release poster
- Directed by: Gregory Ratoff
- Screenplay by: Jules Furthman; Tom Reed
- Adaptation by: Niven Busch
- Based on: Moss Rose by Joseph Shearing
- Produced by: Gene Markey
- Starring: Peggy Cummins; Victor Mature; Ethel Barrymore
- Cinematography: Joseph MacDonald
- Edited by: James B. Clark
- Music by: David Buttolph
- Color process: Black and white
- Production company: 20th Century Fox
- Distributed by: 20th Century Fox
- Release date: May 30, 1947
- Running time: 82 minutes
- Country: United States
- Language: English

Moss Rose is a 1947 American mystery film directed by Gregory Ratoff and starring Peggy Cummins, Victor Mature and Ethel Barrymore. It is an adaptation of the 1934 novel Moss Rose by Marjorie Bowen based on a real-life Victorian murder case.

== Plot ==
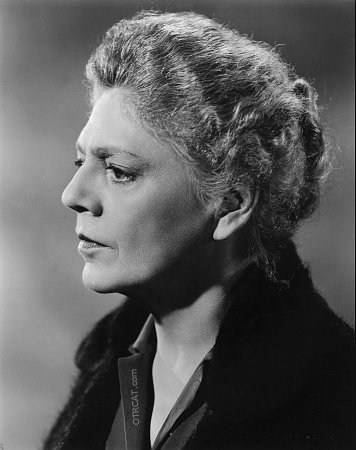
Ethel Barrymore as Lady Margaret Drego

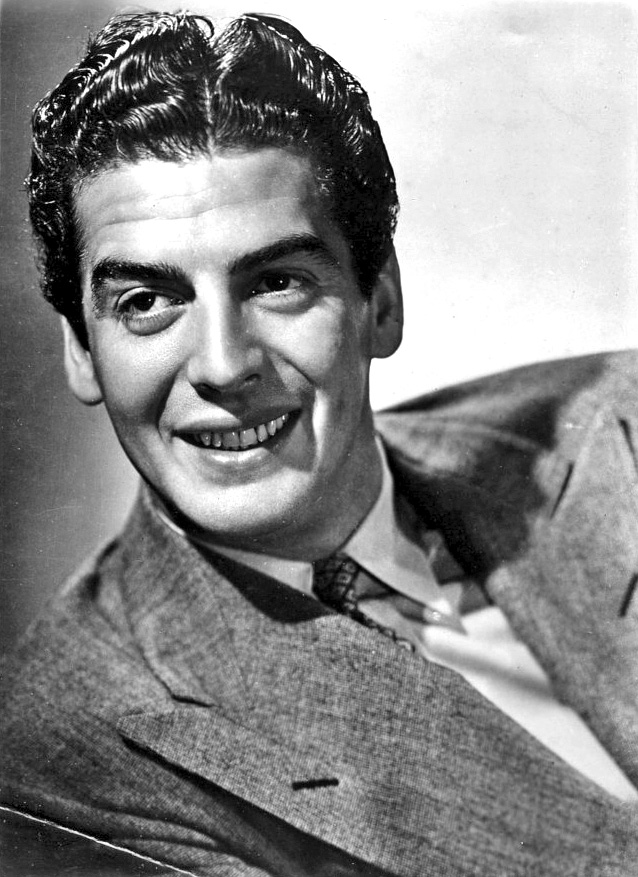
Victor Mature as Michael Drego

The film begins in the late 19th century with a young woman named Belle Adair riding a train to Toronto, Ontario. She reminisces to her time in London, England.

Belle is working as a dancer in the chorus of a London theater and lives in a London Lodging house. Her friend Daisy Arrow is one of her neighbors. Late one evening, Belle sees Daisy leaving the lodging house in a hansom cab with some gentleman. The next morning, Belle notices a man leaving Daisy's room. When he enters the room, she finds Daisy dead, a rose on an open Bible beside her body.

Police Inspector R. Clinner and Sergeant Evans tell the lodgers that Daisy was drugged and then smothered or strangled. Clinner, an amateur horticulturalist, notes that the rose is a moss rose, which requires acidic soil and is currently out of season. Later that day, Belle finds the cabby who picked up the gentleman that morning. The driver tells her that he drove him to the Regency Hotel.

Meanwhile, Michael Drego, his fiancée, Audrey Ashton and his mother, Lady Margaret Drego, are dining in the restaurant of the Regency Hotel. Michael tells Audrey and Lady Margaret that he was surprised to see them in London. He promises to join them at their country estate as soon as he can. Belle arrives at the hotel and sees Michael in the restaurant. When he leaves, she follows him to his room. Belle introduces herself to Michael and tells him that she saw him leave Daisy's room. Michael denies knowing Daisy; he understands that Belle is trying to blackmail him. She makes a demand for money, but he refuses.

Back at the lodging house, Belle sees a wedding announcement in the news paper for Michael and Audrey. Belle then sends an anonymous letter to Inspector Clinner, accusing Michael of involvement in Daisy's murder. Clinner later interviews Michael. The inspector has Michael about what he was doing on the night of the murder; Michael gives a false account. After the interview, Michael sends Belle a note, telling her that he will give her the money. They should meet at an art gallery the next day. Since Belle was Daisy's friend, Clinner also questions her. When asked if she had seen Michael, Belle says no. At the art gallery, Michael gives her an envelope of cash.

After his meeting with Michael, Belle changes plans. She sends the money back to him and ask for a second meeting at Waterloo Bridge, Belle tells Michael that she isn't interested in the money. What she really wants is to spend two weeks at the Drego family estate in Devonshire so that she can experience the lifestyle of a lady. At first Michael refuses, but relents when Belle threatens to contact Clinner. After Michael buys Belle an appropriate wardrobe, the two travel to Devonshire, where Belle meets Audrey and Lady Margaret. Michael privately informs the two ladies of the reason for Belle's visit.

Audrey is very upset by Belle's presence at the estate, but Lady Margaret receives her graciously. Lady Margaret later catches Belle snooping in a deserted child's room. She explains that it was Michael's room before his father Lord Drego took him away to Canada for many years. Audrey reveals to Belle that she knows her personal history but wants to be friends. Audrey then travels to London to buy her wedding trousseau. Michael spends time conversing with Belle; she realizes that he doesn't love Audrey.

Meanwhile, Clinner's investigation of Daisy's murder has brought him to Devonshire. He had determined that the bible found by Daisy's body matched three bibles purchased by Audrey. Since she is out of town, Clinner is unable to question her. At the Drego estate, Clinner asks Lady Margaret to show him the collection rose plants in her greenhouse to see if any of them are moss roses. When Clinner learns that Belle is staying at the estate, he send her a note asking for another interview. at the village inn.

Afraid that she may incriminate Michael, Bell decides to leave for London on the afternoon train. Michael talks her out of leaving and they both realize that they are in love. Belle has her interview with Clinner and he returns to London. When Audrey comes back to the Drego estate, Michael confesses his love for Belle. An infuriated Audrey accuses Belle of destroying her relationship with Michael.

Later that day, Belle discovers Audrey dead in her room, with a rose on an open bible on her bedside table. At the coroner's inquest, it is established that Audrey died from an overdose of sleeping pills. They hold Michael for questioning and contact Clinner in London. When Clinner arrives at the local gaol, Michael confesses to Audrey's murder. Clinner notifies Belle, who in turn passes the news to Lady Margaret.

Talking with Belle, Lady Margaret realizes that she truly loves Michael. Before retiring for the evening, the two women drink some tea and Belle becomes very sleepy. Belle then lies down on the bed in her room. Lady Margaret then enters the room and tries to place a rose and a bible on the bed. A groggy Belle suddenly realizes that Lady Margaret killed both Daisy and Audrey. Just as Lady Margaret is about to smother Belle with a pillow, Michael and several policemen break into the room. Clinner's report about Michael's confession was just a ploy to catch Lady Margaret in the act. She is arrested.

The film ends showing Belle again on the train; Michael will meet at the Toronto train station. In retrospect, he understands now that Lady Margaret, now deceased, wanted her son only for herself.

== Cast ==
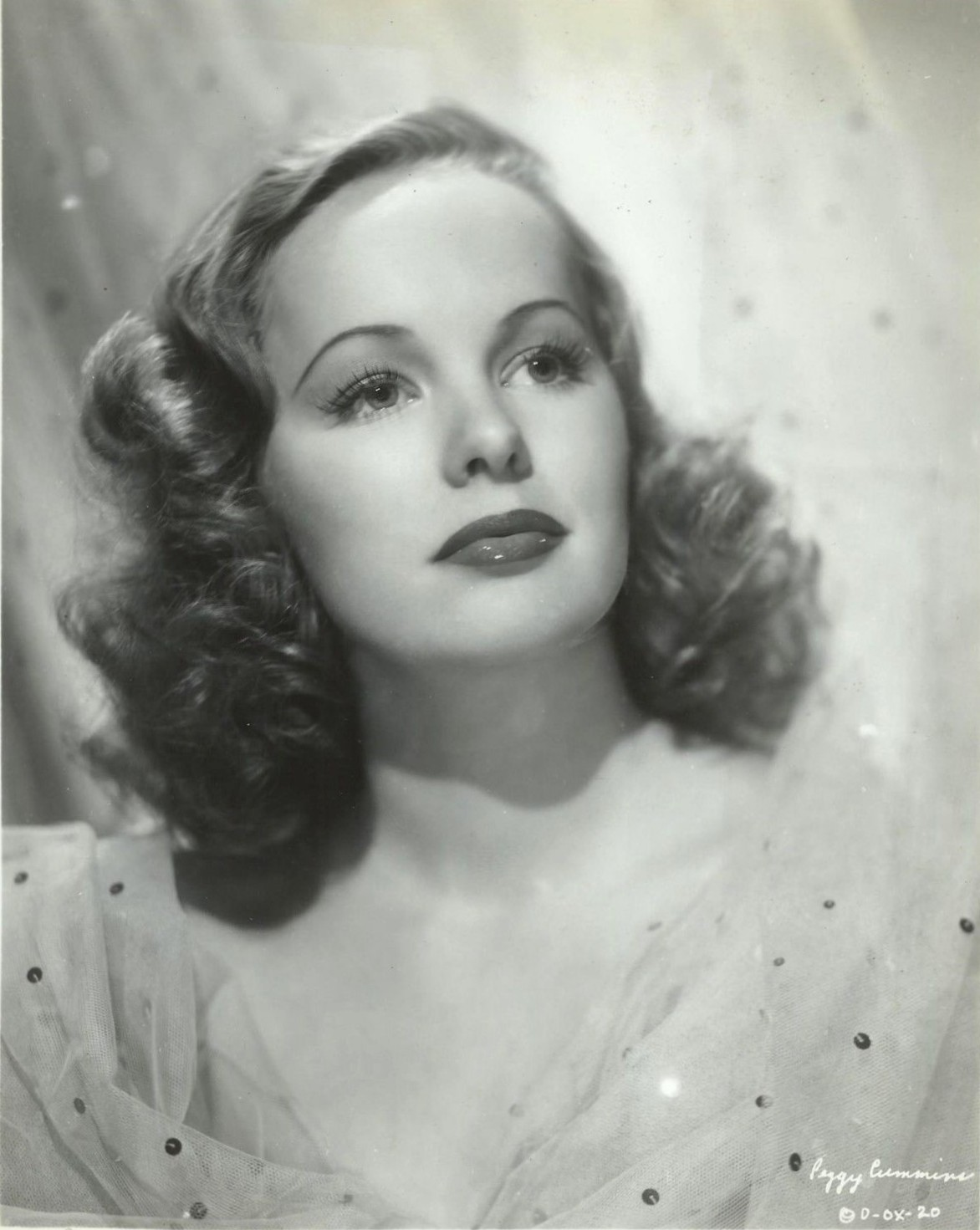
Peggy Cummins as Belle Adair

- Peggy Cummins as Belle Adair aka Rose Lynton
- Victor Mature as Michael Drego
- Ethel Barrymore as Lady Margaret Drego
- Vincent Price as Police Inspector R. Clinner
- Margo Woode as Daisy Arrow
- George Zucco as Craxton, the butler
- Patricia Medina as Audrey Ashton
- Rhys Williams as Deputy Inspector Evans
- John Rogers as Fothergill
- Patrick O'Moore as George Gilby
- Billy Bevan as white horse cabby (uncredited)
- Al Ferguson as constable (uncredited)
- Gerald Oliver Smith as hotel clerk (uncredited)
- John Goldsworthy as mnister (uncredited)
- Stuart Holmes as pompous English colonel (uncredited)

== Production ==
20th Century Fox announced they had paid their highest ever price for the screen rights to Moss Rose, a 1934 novel by British novelist Marjorie Bowen. Fox cast Peggy Cummins for the lead role.

"Ethel Barrymore was in it", Vincent Price said of Moss Rose. "I was terrified of her until one day between takes she waddles up and whispers, 'Got a smoke?'"

== Reception ==
Vincent Price as Inspector Clinner

=== Box-office ===
Moss Rose, was a commercial disappointment. Darryl F. Zanuck called it

"a catastrophe, for which I blame myself. Our picture was not as good as the original script and the casting was atrocious. The property lost $1,300,000 net."

=== Critical response ===
When Moss Rose, was released, The New York Times film critic, Bosley Crowther, praised the film, writing,

"Readers of thriller fiction have been talking for quite some time about a writer called Joseph Shearing, whose many period mysteries are said to have a flavor and distinction all their own. And now it appears that film-goers will have reason to join the claque, if all of this author's output is as adaptable as the first to reach the screen. For Moss Rose, the first of several promised Shearing films, which hit the Roxy yesterday, is a suave and absorbing mystery thriller, neatly plotted and deliciously played ... Thanks to a splendid performance by Peggy Cummins in the role of the girl, there is something to watch when she is acting besides the consequence of the makeup artist's work. Her job as the Cockney chorus girl has spirit, humor and brass—and a surprisingly tender quality which nicely rounds the role."

The staff at Variety magazine also gave the Moss Rose a positive review. They wrote,

"Moss Rose is good whodunit. Given a lift by solid trouping and direction, melodrama is run off against background of early-day England that provides effective setting for theme of destructive mother love ... Gregory Ratoff's direction develops considerable flavor to the period melodramatics. He gets meticulous performances from players in keeping with mood of piece."
