= Moss Rose (novel) =

1934 novel

- First edition
- Author: Marjorie Bowen
- Language: English
- Genre: Mystery thriller
- Publisher: Heinemann
- Publication date: 1934
- Publication place: United Kingdom
- Media type: Print

Moss Rose is a 1934 mystery novel by the British writer Marjorie Bowen, written under the pen name of Joseph Shearing. It is based on the unsolved murder of Harriet Buswell in 1872. The title refers to Moss Rose, a flowering plant.

== Adaptations ==
It was adapted into the 1947 film Moss Rose directed by Gregory Ratoff and starring Peggy Cummins, Victor Mature and Ethel Barrymore.

== Bibliography ==
- Goble, Alan. The Complete Index to Literary Sources in Film. Walter de Gruyter, 1999.
- Vinson, James. Twentieth-Century Romance and Gothic Writers. Macmillan, 1982.
