= Music hall songs =

List of music hall songs

Music hall songs were sung in the music halls by a variety of artistes. Most of them were comic in nature. There are a very large number of music hall songs, and most of them have been forgotten. In London, between 1900 and 1910, a single publishing company, Francis, Day and Hunter, published between forty and fifty songs a month.

== Examples ==
They number in their tens of thousands and include the following:

- "After the Ball" (Charles K. Harris)
- "The Army of Today's All Right"
- "Any Old Iron" (music by Charles Collins; lyrics by Terry Sheppard) sung by Harry Champion.
- "Boiled Beef and Carrots" (Charles Collins and Fred Murray) sung by Harry Champion.
- "The Boy I Love is up in the Gallery" (George Ware) sung by Nelly Power and Marie Lloyd.
- "Burlington Bertie from Bow" (William Hargreaves) sung by Ella Shields.
- "Daddy Wouldn't Buy Me a Bow Wow" (Joseph Tabrar) sung by Vesta Victoria.
- "Daisy Bell" (Harry Dacre) sung by Katie Lawrence.
- "Don't Dilly Dally on the Way" (Charles Collins and Fred W. Leigh) sung by Marie Lloyd.
- "Down at the Old Bull and Bush" (music by Harry von Tilzer; lyrics by Andrew B. Sterling) sung by Florrie Forde.
- "Goodbye, Dolly Gray" (Paul Barnes; Will. D. Cobb) sung by George Lashwood.
- "Has Anybody Here Seen Kelly?" (C.W. Murphy and Will Letters) sung by Florrie Ford.
- "Hello, Hello, Who's Your Lady Friend?" (music by Harry Fragson; lyrics by Worton David and Bert Lee) sung by Mark Sheridan.
- "Hold Your Hand Out, Naughty Boy" (C.W. Murphy and Will Letters) sung by Florrie Ford.
- "I'm Henery the Eighth, I Am" (1911) (Fred Murray and Bert Weston) sung by Harry Champion.
- "The Honeysuckle and the Bee"
- "I Do Like to Be Beside the Seaside" sung by various people including Mark Sheridan and Florrie Forde.
- "I Live in Trafalgar Square" (C.W. Murphy) sung by Morny Cash.
- "If It Wasn't For The 'Ouses In Between" (music by George Le Brunn; lyrics by Edgar Bateman) sung by Gus Elen.
- "If You Want to Know the Time, Ask a Policeman" (Edward Rogers and Augustus Durandeau) sung by James Fawn.
- "It's a Bit of a Ruin That Cromwell Knocked About a Bit" (Harry Bedford; Terry Sullivan) sung by Marie Lloyd.
- "It's a Long Way to Tipperary" (1914) (Jack Judge and Harry Williams) sung by Florrie Forde.
- "Knees Up Mother Brown" a song, published in 1938, by which time it had already been known for some years.
- "Let's All Go Down the Strand" (Harry Castling and C.W. Murphy) sung by Charles R. Whittle.
- "Maybe It's Because I'm a Londoner" (Hubert Gregg)
- "Nellie Dean" (Henry W. Armstrong) sung by Gertie Gitana.
- "Oh! It's a lovely war" sung by Ella Shields.
- "Oh! Mr Porter" (music by George Le Brunn; lyrics by Thomas Le Brunn) sung by Marie Lloyd.
- "Proper Cup of Coffee"
- "She Was A Sweet Little Dicky Bird"
- "Ship Ahoy! (All the Nice Girls Love a Sailor)", performed by Hetty King
- "Ta-ra-ra-boom-de-ay" (Harry J. Sayers) sung by Lottie Collins.
- "The Man Who Broke the Bank at Monte Carlo" (Fred Gilbert) sung by Charles Coborn.
- "To Be There" (1886) (written by C.A. Page; composed by J. Iliffe.) sung by Sam Torr.
- "Waiting At The Church" (Henry E. Pether; Fred W. Leigh) sung by Vesta Victoria.
- "We're Going to Hang out the Washing on the Siegfried Line" by Jimmy Kennedy was first published in 1939
- "When Father Papered the Parlour" (Weston and Barnes) sung by Billy Williams.
- "Where Did You Get That Hat?" (James Rolmaz) sung by J.C Heffron.
- "Your Baby Has Gone Down The Plughole" (also known as "A Mother's Lament" and "The Angels' Reply") (writer unknown), later covered by Cream

== Bawdy examples ==
Many of the following burlesque songs, which were written before the First World War, continue to be sung today in certain British Rugby Football clubs.

- "Christmas Day In The Cookhouse"
- "Dinah, Dinah Show Us Your Leg"
- "Good Ship Venus"
- "It's Hard to Say I Love You"
- "Ivan Skavinsky Skavar"
- "My Father's a Lavatory Cleaner"
- "Old Dan Tucker"
- "Parlez Vous"
- "The Great Big Wheel" a.k.a. the "Engineer's Song"
- "The Moon Shines Bright on Charlie Chaplin"
- "The Gentleman Soldier"
