= Waiting at the Church (disambiguation) =

Waiting at the Church is a popular British music hall song by Vesta Victoria.

Waiting at the Church may also refer to:

== Films ==
- Waiting at the Church (1906 film), directed by Edwin S. Porter
- Waiting at the Church (1911 film), produced by Carl Laemmle
- Waiting at the Church (1919 film), directed by Eddie Lyons
- Waiting at the Church, alternate title for The Runaround (1931 film), directed by William James Craft

== Books ==
- Waiting at the Church (1958 book), written by L. du Garde Peach
- Waiting at the Church (1968 book), written by Charity Blackstock
