= I Thank You (film) =

- Opening title card
- Directed by: Marcel Varnel
- Screenplay by: Marriott Edgar; Val Guest
- Based on: an original story by Howard Irving Young
- Produced by: Edward Black
- Starring: See below
- Cinematography: Arthur Crabtree
- Edited by: R. E. Dearing
- Music by: Noel Gay
- Production company: Gainsborough Pictures
- Distributed by: General Film Distributors (UK)
- Release date: 20 October 1941 (UK)
- Running time: 83 minutes
- Country: United Kingdom
- Language: English

I Thank You is a 1941 black and white British comedy film directed by Marcel Varnel and starring Arthur Askey, Richard Murdoch, Graham Moffatt and Moore Marriott. The screenplay was by Marriott Edgar and Val Guest. The film was produced by Edward Black at Gainsborough Pictures. The title of the film is the literal version of Arthur Askey's famous catch-phrase which he idiosyncratically pronounced as "Ay-thang-yaw".

== Plot summary ==
In London during the Second World War at the time of the Blitz, Arthur and Stinker are a couple of out-of-work variety entertainers who use great ingenuity in their efforts to get financial assistance to "put on a show". Hoping to put their proposal to the formidable Lady Randall, a former music hall star, they infiltrate her house, with Stinker in the guise of a servant and Arthur (in drag) as a cook. After some farcical events, they achieve their aim when Lady Randall is persuaded to sing an old music hall favourite "Waiting at the Church" at an impromptu show located underground at Aldwych tube station, being used during the war as an underground bomb shelter.

== Cast ==
- Arthur Askey as Arthur
- Richard Murdoch as Stinker
- Lily Morris as Lady Randall
- Moore Marriott as Pop Bennett
- Graham Moffatt as Albert Brown
- Peter Gawthorne as Dr. Pope
- Kathleen Harrison as Cook
- Felix Aylmer as Henry Potter
- Eleanor Farrell as Herself
- Charlie Forsythe as Himself
- Addie Seamon as Herself
- Issy Bonn as Himself
- Cameron Hall as Lomas
- Wally Patch as Bill
- Roberta Huby as Bobbie
- Noel Dainton as Police Sergeant
- Phyllis Morris as Miss Pizer

== Soundtrack ==
- Arthur Askey – "Hello to the Sun" (Written by Noel Gay and Frank Eyton)
- Arthur Askey and Richard Murdoch – "Half of Everything Is Yours" (Written by Noel Gay and Frank Eyton)
- Eleanor Farrell – "Oh Johnny, Teach Me to Dance" (Written by Noel Gay and Frank Eyton)
- Charlie Forsythe – "Let's Get Hold of Hitler" (Written by Noel Gay and Frank Eyton)
- Lily Morris – "Waiting at the Church" (Written by Fred W. Leigh and Henry E. Pether)

== Critical reception ==
The Monthly Film Bulletin wrote: "Slap-stick comedy can be good, and if you like Arthur Askey you will like this film in spite of indifferent direction. Kathleen Harrison is an excellent 'cook from next door' and Felix Aylmer makes an admirable brother-in-law to Lady Randall, but by and large the film gives an impression of a number of people using a medium to which they are not accustomed, and even Arthur Askey and ''Stinker' Murdoch cannot compensate for this even to their 'fans'."

Kine Weekly wrote: "There is not much of a plot, but the fooling, which ranges from straight farce to slapstick, is versatile and boisterous. Moreover, from the stars downwards, the players are masters of improvisation."

The Radio Times gave the film two out of five stars, and wrote, "not even the hard-working Arthur Askey and Richard Murdoch plus Will Hay old boys Moore Marriott and Graham Moffatt can warm up this tepid "upstairs-downstairs" charade."

Sky Movies rated the film three out of five stars, describing it as a "cheerful, long-unseen British wartime romp...It's all directed by that master of comic organisation, Frenchman Marcel (Oh, Mr Porter!) Varnel. It's not one of his best, and some of it looks pretty dated now, but some scenes still raise a hearty chuckle."

Diarist Hackney ARP Warden Thomas E. Browne went to see Arthur Askey in "I Thankyou”, Saturday 25th October 1941, describing the film as “Very funny.”
