= Lily Morris =

English music hall performer (1882–1952)

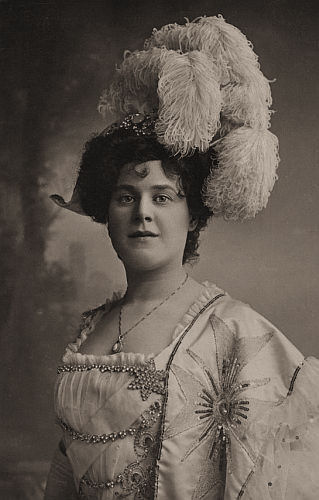
- Lily Morris as Jack in Jack and Jill at the Prince's Theatre, Bristol (1907)
- Born: Lilles Mary Crosby; 30 September 1882; Holborn, London, England
- Died: 3 October 1952 (aged 70); Golders Green, London, England
- Occupations: Singer, comic performer, actor
- Years active: 1894–1948

Lily Morris (born Lilles Mary Crosby; 30 September 1882 – 3 October 1952) was an English music hall performer, who specialised in singing comedic songs, notably "Why Am I Always the Bridesmaid" and "Don't Have Any More, Missus Moore".

== Biography ==
She was born in the Holborn area of London, the daughter of Maurice Crosby, a cigar maker and amateur songwriter. He directed her early career, which started in music halls in 1894, when she was 11 years old. Her first successful song, "Lardi-Doody-Day", written for her by Joseph Tabrar, brought her to the attention of promoter Augustus Harris, who cast her in a minor role in the annual pantomime at the Theatre Royal, Drury Lane. Her reputation grew, and she continued to perform Tabrar songs in major London theatres, and around the country, over the next few years. In 1897, she took the lead role in Cinderella in the Theatre Royal, Nottingham.

She made a successful transition from child to adult performer, and built a formidable and lengthy career. She developed a particularly strong reputation as a principal boy in pantomimes. A review of her role in pantomime in Bristol in 1907 described her as having "plenty of spirit" and "the necessary amount of dash and 'go'." Her most successful songs included "Why Am I Always the Bridesmaid", written for her in 1917 by Fred W. Leigh and Charles Collins, and "Don't Have Any More, Missus Moore", written in 1926 by Harry Castling and James Walsh. She made recordings of several of her songs, for various record labels including Columbia and Regal.

Her career included several successful international tours. She had a particularly successful run at the Palace Theatre in New York City in 1928. She also appeared in the musical revue film Elstree Calling (1930), co-directed by Alfred Hitchcock. Roger Wilmut wrote of Morris:

Her performance of "Why Am I Always the Bridesmaid" in Elstree Calling shows the sort of polish that could only be obtained by taking the same act round the halls for years, improving it, tightening it up, and producing a performance where every line has a suitable little visual gag or facial expression; it is one of the funniest pieces of film in existence.

Morris appeared in the film Radio Parade of 1935 as a charlady alongside fellow music hall performer Nellie Wallace. In 1941 she appeared as the formidable "Lady Randall" in the Arthur Askey comedy I Thank You but reverts to type in the final scene where she gives a rendition of the old music hall standard "Waiting at the Church" at an impromptu concert in a tube station bomb shelter. She retired from the stage in 1940, but briefly replaced Wallace in Don Ross's show Thanks for the Memory in 1948. Ross had wanted to include both Morris and Wallace in the show, but the two women refused to appear on the same bill together.

Morris married Archibald McDougall in 1907. She died in London in 1952, six weeks after her husband's death.

== Song hits ==
Lily Morris's most popular song hits include:

- "Because He Loves Me", written by Harry Castling
- "My Old Man (Said Follow the Van)" (original performer: Marie Lloyd)
- "Don't Have Any More, Missus Moore" (1929), written by Harry Castling and James Walsh.
- "He's Only a Working Man", written by Fred Holt and Herbert Rule, Roud RN30376
- "The Old Apple Tree"
- "Waiting at the Church", written by Fred W. Leigh (words) and Henry E. Pether (music)
- "Why Am I Always the Bridesmaid, Never the Blushing Bride?", written 1917, by Charles Collins and Fred W. Leigh

== Selected filmography ==
- Elstree Calling (1930)
- Variety (1935)
