= Waiting at the Church (1906 film) =

1906 film

- Directed by: Edwin S. Porter
- Production company: Edison Manufacturing Company
- Release date: July 1906
- Country: United States
- Language: Silent

Waiting at the Church is a 1906 American silent film directed by Edwin S. Porter for the Edison Manufacturing Company.

The film has been preserved in the Library of Congress collection.

== Production ==
The film features a performance of the popular British music hall song Waiting at the Church by Vesta Victoria.

The action in the film follows the lyrics of the song. Porter made another film to accompany the song for the Novelty Song Film Co. in 1907. That version focuses more on the singer's performance.

== Release ==
Film historian Charles Musser notes that Waiting at the Church was Edison's lowest-selling film of the year, at 52 copies, compared to Dream of a Rarebit Fiend, which sold 192.

== Cast ==
- Vesta Victoria - Vesta
- Alec B. Francis - suitor
