= A Little of What You Fancy Does You Good =

Song by Marie Lloyd
- Released: 1916
- Genre: Music hall
- Label: Regal
- Composer: George Arthurs
- Lyricist: Fred W. Leigh

"A Little of What You Fancy Does You Good" is an English music hall song first published in 1915 (originally as "A Little Bit of What You Fancy Does You Good"), and popularised by Marie Lloyd. It was composed by George Arthurs with lyrics by Fred W. Leigh, and was published by Francis, Day & Hunter.

It became one of the best known music hall songs of its era. The music hall historian Richard Anthony Baker described it as "a summary of Marie Lloyd's music hall philosophy". Lloyd recorded the song for the Regal label in 1916. She knowingly presented the song with a sexual innuendo, with lyrics such as: "I always hold in having it if you fancy it / If you fancy it that’s understood / And suppose it makes you fat? I don’t worry over that / ‘Cos a little of what you fancy does you good."

The title phrase itself became, and remains, in widespread use. It has been used in advertising food such as cream cakes, as well as giving the title to compilations both of Marie Lloyd's songs and of music hall songs more generally. It was also used as the title of a 1968 documentary on music hall history directed by Robert D. Webb. It also was the source of the title of H.E. Bates' novel "A Little of What You Fancy".
