= Fred Albert =

- Fred Albert, drawn in 1878.
- Born: George Richard Howell; 6 November 1843; Hoxton, London, England
- Died: 12 October 1886 (aged 42); Islington, London, England
- Occupations: Music hall entertainer and songwriter
- Years active: 1860s–1886

George Richard Howell (6 November 1843 – 12 October 1886), who performed as Fred Albert, was an English music hall entertainer who became popular in the 1870s for his self-penned satirical songs, becoming "music hall's first overtly 'topical' singer."

== Biography ==
Born in Hoxton, he worked in a merchants' office in the City of London before making his earliest appearances on stage at Hoxton Hall in the 1860s. He was known as an "infallible mirth-maker", and had a reputation for correctly reflecting public opinion. His manner was formal – he had a waxed moustache and wore white tie and tails, and his apparent stiffness gave rise to a false rumour that he had a wooden leg.

All of his material was self-penned; much was improvised, and dealt with current news. He was known as a "lightning" vocalist, being able to sing three topical songs in five minutes. One of his pieces, "The Latest Events of the Year", was regularly updated. Another of his songs, "Perverted Proverbs or Tupperny Philosophy", was a satire on the popular book Proverbial Philosophy by Martin Tupper. His other songs included "I Knew That I Was Dreaming", "The Mad Butcher". and "Take Care of the Pence". By the 1870s, he included much patriotic and political material such as "The Turkey and the Bear" into his performances.

For some years he performed with piano accompanist Lottie Cherry, sometimes billed as 'Mrs Fred Albert'; although they had a son together, they never married, and she later married a music hall proprietor, James Graydon.

Fred Albert died in 1886, aged 42, after a short and sudden illness, and was buried at Abney Park Cemetery. His grave was restored in 2013 by the Music Hall Guild.
