= Charles Collins (songwriter) =

English songwriter (1874–1923)

Charles William Collins (18 December 1874 – 15 February 1923) was an English songwriter, who composed the music for several famous music hall songs of the early twentieth century.

He was born in Walworth, London. His successful songs included "I Wouldn’t Leave My Little Wooden Hut For You" (1905), written with Tom Mellor and performed by Daisy Dormer; "Now I Have To Call Him Father" (1908), written with Fred Godfrey and performed by Vesta Victoria; "Boiled Beef and Carrots" (1910), written with Fred Murray and performed by Harry Champion; "Any Old Iron" (1911), written with Fred E. Terry and performed by Harry Champion; "Why Am I Always the Bridesmaid?" (1917) written with Fred W. Leigh and sung by Lily Morris; and "Don't Dilly Dally on the Way" (1919), also written with Leigh and sung by Marie Lloyd.

Collins died in London in 1923, aged 48.
