= Katie Lawrence =

English singer (1868–1913)

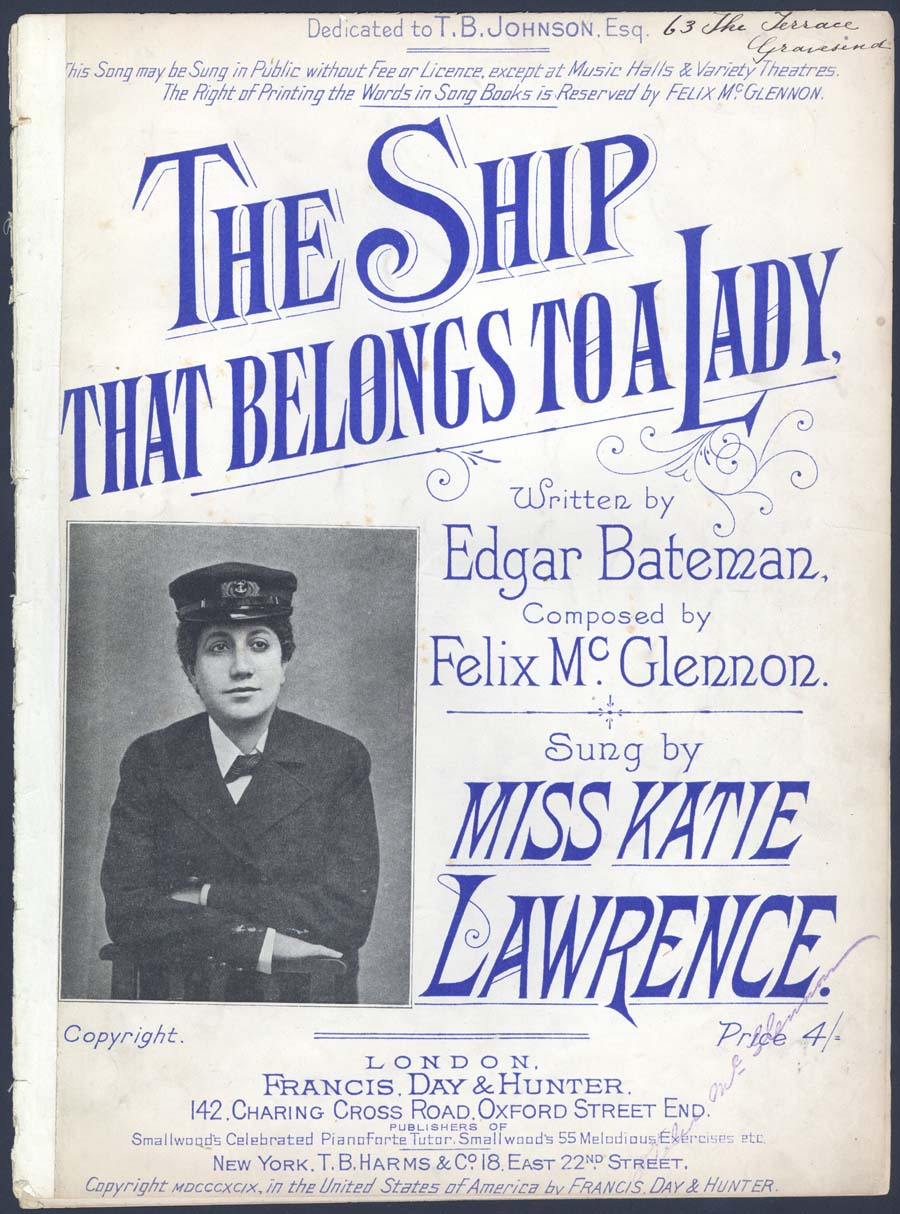
- Lawrence pictured on a sheet music cover, 1899
- Born: 17 September 1868; England
- Died: 21 October 1913 (aged 45); Birmingham, England
- Occupation: Music hall singer
- Spouse: George Fuller

Katie Lawrence (17 September 1868 – 21 October 1913) was an English music-hall singer, best known for Harry Dacre's 1890s' hit "Daisy Bell".

== Appearances in other media ==
The Impressionist painter Walter Sickert produced some hundred and sixty-six preparatory sketches of Lawrence performing at Gatti's Hungerford Place of Varieties in 1887. These formed the basis of a number of paintings he made of her in the 1880s and in 1903. Only one painting, that from 1903, survives; the rest are presumed destroyed. As recently as 2005, while this painting was undergoing routine restoration work, it was discovered that the Katie Lawrence scene was actually painted over an earlier composition. Using X-rays, art restorers discerned a study of the exterior of a church beneath the music hall scene.

In a draft of the fifteenth episode of Ulysses (1922), James Joyce uses Lawrence's name for one of the prostitutes in the brothel.

== Selected songs ==
- "Katie My Own: Ballad", Walter Tilbury (London: Francis, Day & Hunter Ltd., 1890).
- "In a Snug Little Home of Your Own", H. G. Banks and Felix McGlennon (London: Francis, Day & Hunter, 1892).
- "Daisy Bell: A Bicycle Made for Two", Harry Dacre (London: Francis, Day & Hunter, 1892).
- "Mary Jane, or, a Woeful Tale of Love", Arthur Pearl (London: Francis, Day & Hunter, 1892).
- "Molly, the Rose of Mayo", H. A. Duffy and J. M. Harrison (London: Francis, Day and Hunter, 1893).
- "My Old Man!", George Le Brunn and Richard Morton (London: Francis, Day & Hunter, 1893).
- "He Never Cares to Wander from His Own Fireside, or, There's No Place Like 'Home, Sweet Home'", Felix McGlennon (London: Francis, Day and Hunter, 1893).
- "Come Back to the Old Folks at Home", Arthur Pearl (London: Francis, Day & Hunter, 1893).
- "She Tells You the Tale So Nicely", Joseph Tabrar (London: Hopwood & Crew, 1894).
- "Oh, Uncle John!", H. G. Banks and Felix McGlennon (London: Francis, Day & Hunter, 1895).
- "Daddy's Gone to London", Tom Browne and Felix McGlennon (London: Francis, Day and Hunter, 1895).
- "My English Belle", Gus B. Beverley (London: Francis, Day & Hunter, 1896).
- "Oh, I Wonder What They're Doing Now?", Malcolm Arnold and Orlando Powell, (London: Francis, Day & Hunter, 1897).
- "Everybody's Darling, or, Five Little Chicks at Home", Tom Browne and Felix McGlennon (London: Francis, Day & Hunter, 1897).
- "Mary's Tambourine", C. G. Cotes and Felix McGlennon (London: Francis, Day & Hunter, 1897).
- "Stick to Me and the Kids!", George Le Brunn and Wal Pink (London: Francis, Day and Hunter, 1897).
- "Humpy Umpy Ay", Felix McGlennon (London: B. Feldman, 1898).
- "The Ship That Belongs to a Lady", Edgar Bateman and Felix McGlennon (London: Francis, Day & Hunter, 1899).
- "Say Nothing", Tom Browne and Felix McGlennon (London: Francis, Day & Hunter, 1899).
- "Two Little Brandies and Sodas", C. G. Cotes and Bennett Scott (London: Francis, Day & Hunter, 1899).
- "Little Nancy Newlove: The Girl with £1000 a Year", Will Fieldhouse (London: Elliott & Co., 1899).
- "I've Gone out for the Day, or, I Adore Another", Felix McGlennon and George A. Stevens (London: Francis, Day and Hunter, 1899).
- "Tommy, Jack and Joe", Edgar Bateman and Felix McGlennon (London: Francis, Day and Hunter, 1900).
- "Thinking of the Lad Who Went Away", Tom Browne and Felix McGlennon (London: Francis, Day & Hunter, 1900).
- "The Waves Began to Roar", Bert Delmar and Sam Potter (London: Francis, Day & Hunter, 1900).
- "She Looked a Perfect Lady", A. J. Mills and Albert Perry (London: Francis, Day & Hunter, 1900).
- "Oh! Jack, You Are a Handy Man", Nat Clifford (London: Francis, Day & Hunter, 1901).
- "Mary Met the Milkman at the Corner", Harry Allen and J. P. Harrington (London: Francis, Day & Hunter, 1903).
- "Why Shouldn't We Fight for Our Own?", Edgar Bateman and Henry E. Pether (London: Francis, Day & Hunter, 1904).
- "Why Can't I Be a Pal of Yours?", Newton Butts and Herbert Rule (London: Francis, Day & Hunter, 1906).
