= Cream cake =

A cream cake is a generic description of many varieties of cream-filled pastries.

More specifically cream cake may refer to:

- The Viennese Cremeschnitte, known in former Yugoslavia as a kremšnita / kremna rezina or krempita, a slice with a puff pastry base and custard cream.
- The mille-feuille, a cream filled French puff-pastry slice, also called vanilla slice, custard slice, and Napoleon,
  - The kremówka or napoleonka, the Polish variant of the French pastry slice
- The tompouce (in Flemish and Dutch spelled tompoes), a cream cake slice from Belgium and the Netherlands
- Scandinavian cream cake, commonly called bløtkake (Norwegian bokmål), blautkake (Norwegian nynorsk), gräddtårta (Swedish), and flødeskumskage (Danish).

== See also ==
- Ice-cream cake
