= Boiled Beef and Carrots =

Music hall song from England

"Boiled Beef and Carrots" is a comedic music hall song published in 1909. It was composed by Charles Collins and Fred Murray. The song was made famous by Harry Champion who sang it as part of his act and later recorded it. The song extols the virtues of a typical English, and particularly Cockney, dish.

Chorus:

Boiled beef and carrots,
Boiled beef and carrots,
That's the stuff for your "Derby Kell",
Makes you fit and keeps you well.
Don't live like vegetarians
On food they give to parrots,
Blow out your kite, from morn 'til night,
On boiled beef and carrots.

"Derby Kell" is old Cockney rhyming slang for belly ("Derby Kelly"). "Blow out your kite" means "fill your stomach". It uses the word kite (also kyte), a dialect word, originally derived from an Old English word for the womb which, by extension, came to mean the belly.

== See also ==
- Boiled beef
