= George Lashwood =

English singer and comedian (1863–1942)

Background information
- Born: Edward George Wright; 25 April 1863; Birmingham, England
- Died: 20 January 1942 (aged 78) Droitwich Spa, Worcestershire, England
- Genre: Music hall
- Occupations: Singer, comedian

George Lashwood (born Edward George Wright; 25 April 1863 – 20 January 1942) was a popular English singer and comedian of the Edwardian era, who performed in music halls throughout the country, especially in London's East End and at seaside locations such as Blackpool. He was known as "the Beau Brummell of the music halls".

== Biography ==
He was born in Birmingham, the son of a local builder. He made his first provincial appearance in 1883, using the stage name of George Lashwood, and made his London début at the Middlesex Music Hall in Drury Lane in 1893. He was described as "handsome and distinguished... always dressed in the height of fashion", and built his reputation by singing popular and patriotic songs such as "The Last Bullet", and "Motherland", written by Felix McGlennon at the time of the Second Boer War.

Lashwood regularly appeared in pantomimes, and made phonograph recordings of many of his songs, starting as early as 1898. Some of Lashwood's songs became among the earliest hits of the recorded music era and included such numbers as "Riding on Top of the Car", "Send for a Policeman", "Goodbye, Dolly Gray", "After the Ball", and "Oh! Blow The Scenery on the Railway". He toured Australia and the United States, and performed at the Plaza Music Hall in New York in 1909, when it was reported that "Mr Lashwood wears several different costumes, to fit the subjects of his songs, and introduces and interrupts his lyrics with a little patter directed at the audience".

He sang many patriotic songs, popular with troops and the population at home, during World War I. These included "The Death and Glory Boys" and "Where Are the Lads from the Village Tonight?" He was noted for his ability to get the audience to sing along with the refrains of his songs. He also sang many lighter and sentimental songs, such as "In the Twi-Twi-Twilight".

After the end of the war, Lashwood retired, and lived comfortably at Elm Court in Wychbold, Worcestershire. He married twice. His first wife was Charlotte Williams. His second wife, Edith Fink, was an actress, singer and comedienne. He invested heavily in property, and at his death left the notably large sum of £132,000, which Billboard magazine later described as "a record estate for a British stage personality".

He died on 20 January 1942 at Droitwich Spa in Worcestershire, and is buried in the churchyard of St Mary de Wyche, Wychbold.
