= Music hall =

Type of British theatrical entertainment popular between 1850 and 1960

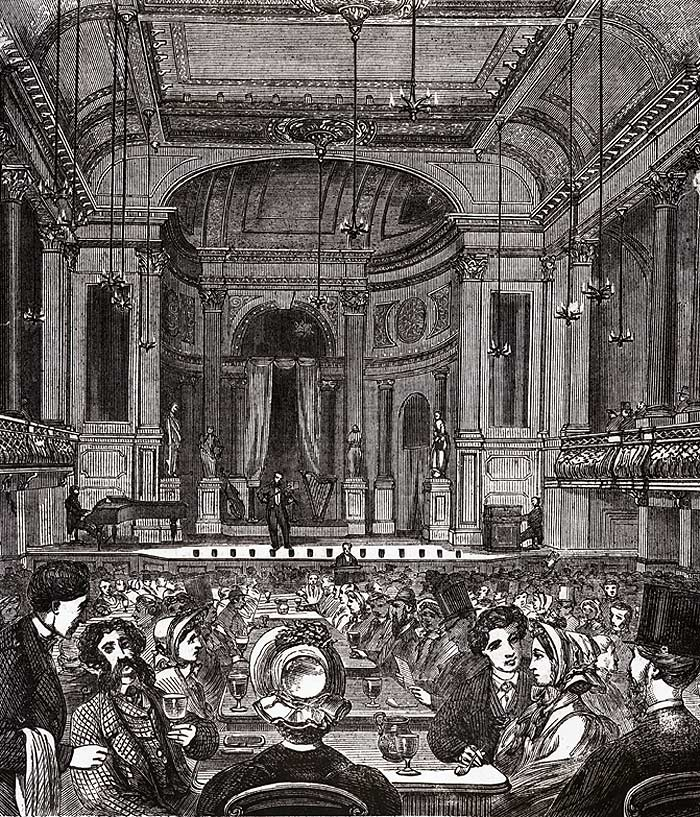
- The Oxford Music Hall, c. 1875
- Stylistic origins: Building: Song and supper room; Music and performance: Variety show; Vaudeville
- Cultural origins: 18th century, United Kingdom

Other topics
- Pantomime

Music hall is a type of British theatrical entertainment that was most popular from the early Victorian era until around World War I. It faded away after 1918 as the halls rebranded their entertainment as variety. Perceptions of a distinction in Britain between bold and scandalous music hall entertainment and subsequent, more respectable variety entertainment differ. Music hall involved a mixture of popular songs, comedy, speciality acts, and variety entertainment. The term is derived from a type of theatre or venue in which such entertainment took place. In North America vaudeville was in some ways analogous to British music hall, featuring rousing songs and comic acts.

Originating in saloon bars within pubs during the 1830s, music hall entertainment became increasingly popular with audiences—so much so, that during the 1850s some public houses were demolished, and specialised music hall theatres developed in their place. These theatres were designed chiefly so that people could consume food and alcohol and smoke tobacco in the auditorium while the entertainment took place, with the cheapest seats located in the gallery. This differed from the conventional type of theatre, which seats the audience in stalls with a separate bar-room. Major music halls were based around London. Early examples included: the Canterbury Music Hall in Lambeth, Wilton's Music Hall in Tower Hamlets, and The Middlesex in Drury Lane, otherwise known as the Old Mo. By the mid-19th century, the halls cried out for many new and catchy songs. As a result professional songwriters were enlisted to provide the music for a plethora of star performers, such as Marie Lloyd, Dan Leno, Little Tich, and George Leybourne. All manner of other entertainment was performed: male and female impersonators, lions comiques, mime artists and impressionists, trampoline acts, and comic pianists (such as John Orlando Parry and George Grossmith) were just a few of the many types of entertainments the audiences could expect to find over the next forty years.

The Music Hall Strike of 1907 was an important industrial conflict. It was a dispute between artists and stage hands on one hand, and theatre managers on the other. The halls had recovered by the start of the First World War and were used to stage charity events in aid of the war effort. Music hall entertainment continued after the war, but became less popular due to upcoming jazz, swing, and big-band dance music acts. Licensing restrictions had also changed, and drinking was banned from the auditorium. A new type of music hall entertainment had arrived, in the form of variety, and many music hall performers failed to make the transition. They were deemed old-fashioned, and with the closure of many halls, music hall entertainment ceased and modern-day variety began.

== Origins and development ==
Music halls had their origins in 18th century London. They grew with the entertainment provided in the new style saloon bars of pubs during the 1830s. These venues replaced earlier semi-rural amusements provided by fairs and suburban pleasure gardens such as Vauxhall Gardens and the Cremorne Gardens. These latter became subject to urban development and became fewer and less popular. From the mid-19th century music halls spread to the provincial cities, such as Bristol.

The saloon was a room where for an admission fee or a greater price at the bar, singing, dancing, drama or comedy was performed. The most famous London saloon of the early days was the Grecian Saloon, established in 1825, at The Eagle (a former tea-garden), 2 Shepherdess Walk, off the City Road in east London. According to John Hollingshead, proprietor of the Gaiety Theatre, London (originally the Strand Music Hall), this establishment was "the father and mother, the dry and wet nurse of the Music Hall". Later known as the Grecian Theatre, it was here that Marie Lloyd made her début at the age of 14 in 1884. It is still famous because of an English nursery rhyme, with the somewhat mysterious lyrics:

Up and down the City Road
In and out The Eagle
That's the way the money goes
Pop goes the weasel.

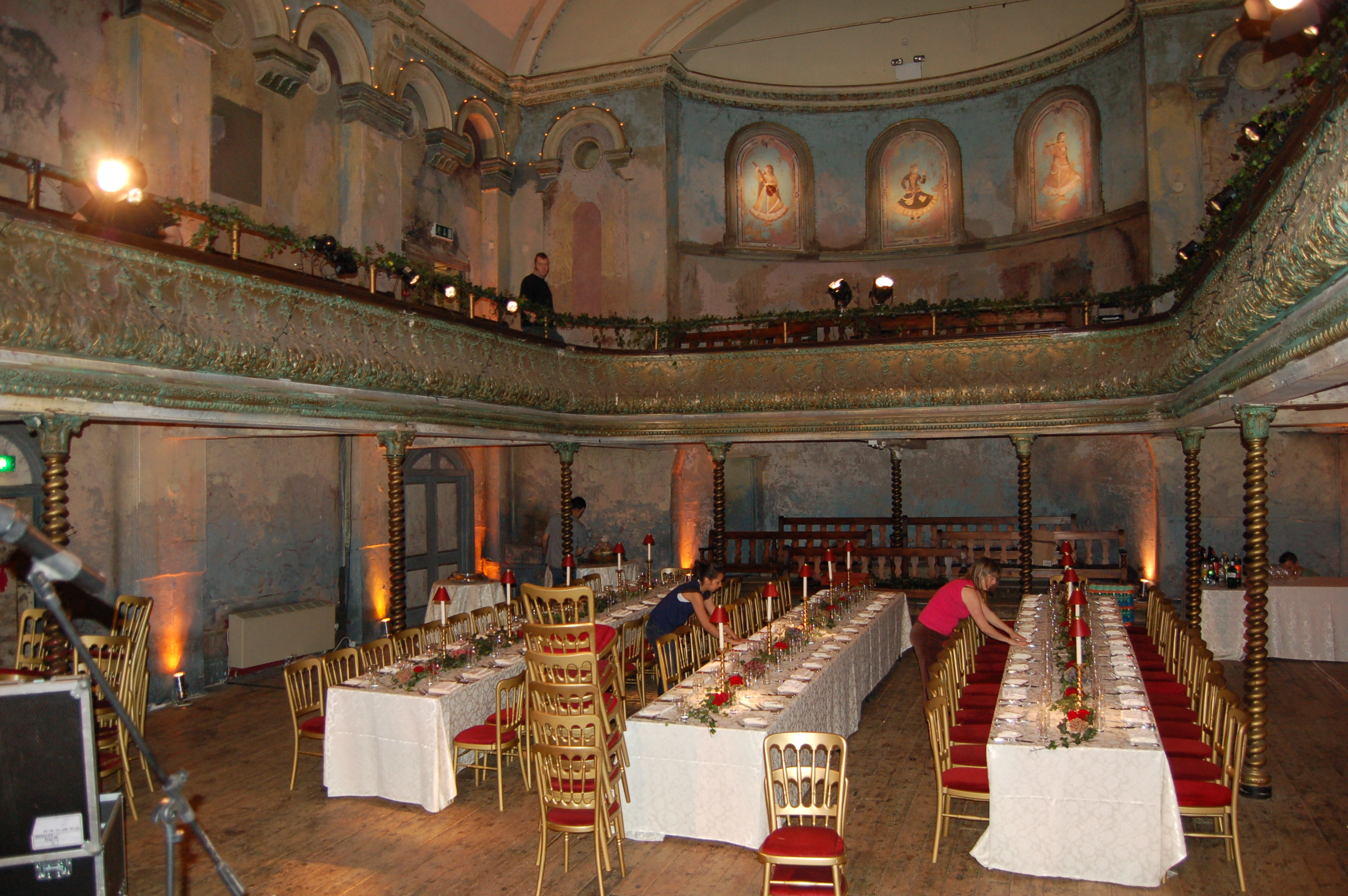
The interior of Wilton's Music Hall (here, being set for a wedding). The line of tables give some idea of how early music halls were used as supper clubs.

Another famous "song and supper" room of this period was Evans Music-and-Supper Rooms, 43 King Street, Covent Garden, established in the 1840s by W.H. Evans. This venue was also known as 'Evans Late Joys' – Joy being the name of the previous owner. Other song and supper rooms included the Coal Hole in The Strand, the Cyder Cellars in Maiden Lane, Covent Garden and the Mogul Saloon in Drury Lane.

The music hall as we know it developed from such establishments during the 1850s and were built in and on the grounds of public houses. Such establishments were distinguished from theatres by the fact that in a music hall you would be seated at a table in the auditorium and could drink alcohol and smoke tobacco whilst watching the show. In a theatre, by contrast, the audience was seated in stalls and there was a separate bar-room. An exception to this rule was the Britannia Theatre, Hoxton (1841) which somehow managed to evade this regulation and served drinks to its customers. Though a theatre rather than a music hall, this establishment later hosted music hall variety acts.

=== Early music halls ===
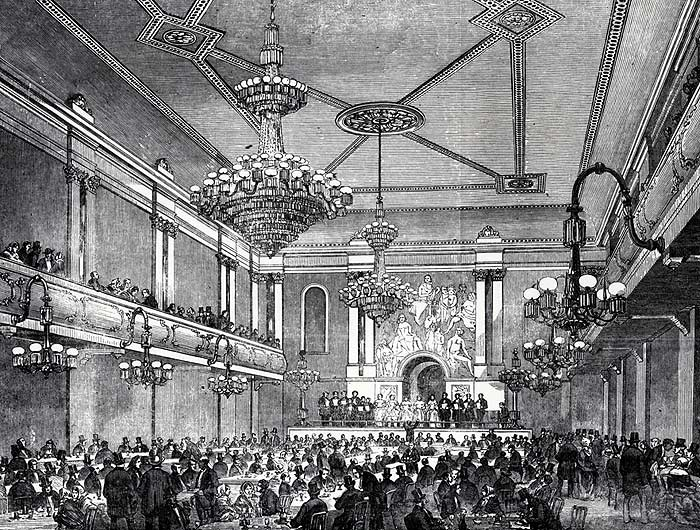
Interior of the Canterbury Hall, opened 1852 in Lambeth, south London

The establishment often regarded as the first true music hall was the Canterbury, 143 Westminster Bridge Road, Lambeth built by Charles Morton, afterwards dubbed "the Father of the Halls", on the site of a skittle alley next to his pub, the Canterbury Tavern. It opened on 17 May 1852 and was described by the musician and author Benny Green as being "the most significant date in all the history of music hall". The hall looked like most contemporary pub concert rooms, but its replacement in 1854 was of then unprecedented size. It was further extended in 1859, later rebuilt as a variety theatre and finally destroyed by German bombing in 1942. The Canterbury Hall became a model for music halls in other cities too, such as the Bristol Canterbury, which was built in 1850s as the first purpose-built music hall in the city.

Another early music hall was The Middlesex, Drury Lane (1851). Popularly known as the 'Old Mo', it was built on the site of the Mogul Saloon. Later converted into a theatre it was demolished in 1965. The New London Theatre stands on its site.

Several large music halls were built in the East End. These included the London Music Hall, otherwise known as The Shoreditch Empire, 95–99 Shoreditch High Street, (1856–1935). This theatre was rebuilt during 1894 by Frank Matcham, the architect of the Hackney Empire. Another in this area was the Royal Cambridge Music Hall, 136 Commercial Street (1864–1936). Designed by William Finch Hill (the designer of the Britannia theatre in nearby Hoxton), it was rebuilt after a fire in 1898.

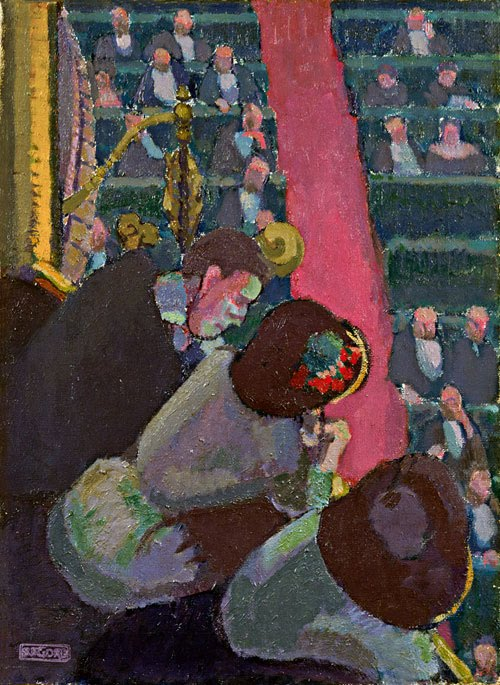
Balcony at the Alhambra by Spencer Gore; 1910–11

The construction of Weston's Music Hall, High Holborn (1857), built up on the site of the Six Cans and Punch Bowl Tavern by the licensed victualler of the premises, Henry Weston, signalled that the West End was fruitful territory for the music hall. During 1906 it was rebuilt as a variety theatre and renamed as the Holborn Empire. It was closed as a result of German action in the Blitz on the night of 11–12 May 1941 and the building was pulled down in 1960. Significant West End music halls include:

- The Oxford Music Hall, 14/16 Oxford Street (1861) – built on the site of an old coaching inn called the Boar and Castle by Charles Morton, the pioneer music hall developer of The Canterbury, who with this development brought music hall to the West End. Demolished in 1926.
- The London Pavilion (1861). Facade of 1885 rebuild still extant.
- The Alhambra Theatre of Variety (1860) in London, which became a model for Parisian music halls. Some years before the Folies-Bergere it staged circus attractions alongside popular ballets in 55 new productions between 1864 and 1870.

Other large suburban music halls included:

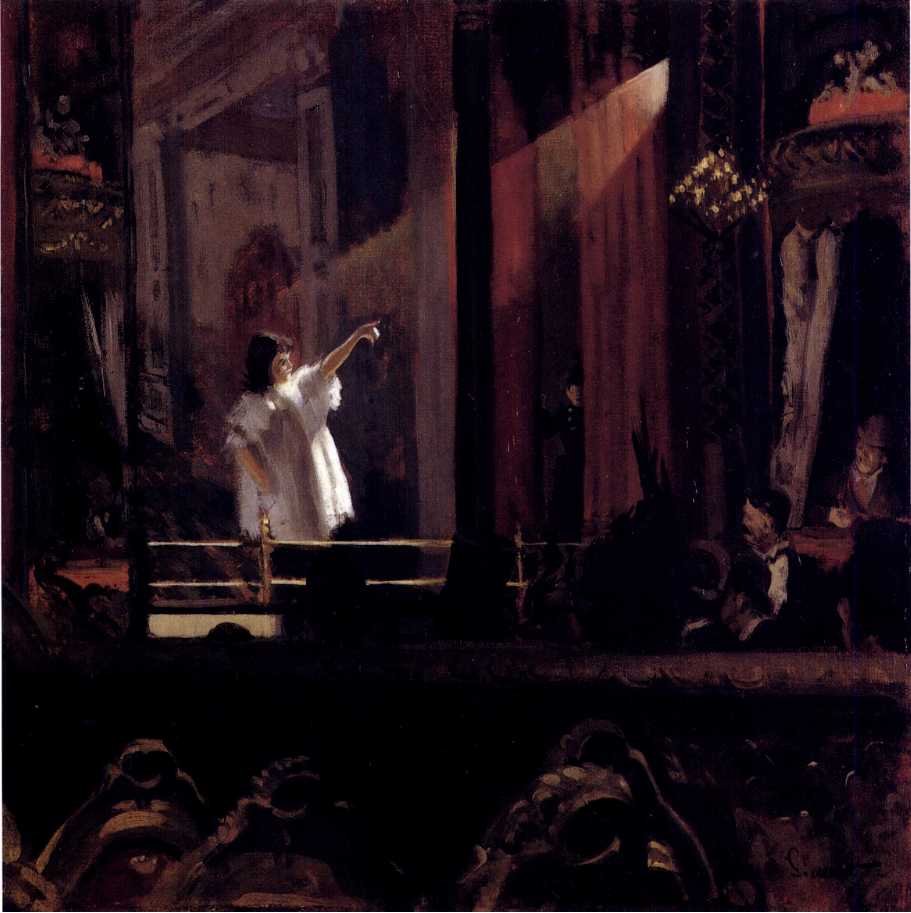
Little Dot Hetherington at the Old Bedford by Walter Sickert; c. 1888

- The Bedford, 93–95 High Street, Camden Town, constructed on the site of the tea gardens of a pub called the Bedford Arms. The first building, the Bedford Music Hall (“The Old Bedford”), opened in 1861 and closed in 1898. It was demolished and rebuilt as the larger Bedford Palace of Varieties also known as the Bedford Theatre (“The New Bedford”), which opened in 1899 and operated until 1959. The Bedford was a favourite haunt of the artist Walter Sickert, who featured interior scenes of music halls in many of his paintings, including one entitled Little Dot Hetherington at the Old Bedford. The Bedford was derelict from 1959 and finally demolished in 1969.
- Collins's or Collins', Islington Green (1863). Opened by Sam Collins on 4 November 1863 after he had converted the pre-existing Lansdowne Arms and Music Hall public house. It was colloquially known as 'The Chapel on the Green'. Collins was a star of his own theatre, singing mostly Irish songs specially composed for him. It closed in 1956, after a fire, but the street front of the building still survives (see below).
- Deacons in Clerkenwell (1862).

A noted music hall entrepreneur of this time was Carlo Gatti who built a music hall, known as Gatti's, at Hungerford Market in 1857. He sold the music hall to South Eastern Railway in 1862, and the site became Charing Cross railway station. With the proceeds from selling his first music hall, Gatti acquired a restaurant in Westminster Bridge Road, opposite The Canterbury music hall. He converted the restaurant into a second Gatti's music hall, known as "Gatti's-in-the-Road", in 1865. It later became a cinema. The building was badly damaged in the Second World War, and was demolished in 1950. In 1867, he acquired a public house in Villiers Street named "The Arches", under the arches of the elevated railway line leading to Charing Cross station. He opened it as another music hall, known as "Gatti's-in-The-Arches". After his death his family continued to operate the music hall, known for a period as the Hungerford or Gatti's Hungerford Palace of Varieties. It became a cinema in 1910, and the Players' Theatre in 1946.

By 1865, there were 32 music halls in London seating between 500 and 5,000 people plus an unknown, but large, number of smaller venues. Numbers peaked in 1878, with 78 large music halls in the metropolis and 300 smaller venues. Thereafter numbers declined due to stricter licensing restrictions imposed by the Metropolitan Board of Works and London County Council, and because of commercial competition between popular large suburban halls and the smaller venues, which put the latter out of business.

A few of the UK's music halls have survived and have retained many of their original features. Among the best examples are:

- Victoria Hall, Settle is a Grade II listed concert hall in Kirkgate, Settle, North Yorkshire, England. It is the UK's oldest surviving music hall having opened as Settle Music Hall on 11 October 1853. The Music Hall was renamed 'The Victoria Hall' around November 1892.
- Wilton's Music Hall is a Grade II listed building in Shadwell, built by John Wilton in 1859 as a music hall and now run as a multi-arts performance space in Graces Alley, off Cable Street in the London Borough of Tower Hamlets.
- The Britannia Music Hall (later known as The Panopticon or The Britannia Panopticon) in Trongate, Glasgow, Scotland was built in 1857/58 and is located above an amusement arcade at 113-117 Trongate.

=== Variety theatre ===
A new era of variety theatre was developed by the rebuilding of the London Pavilion in 1885. Contemporary accounts noted:

Hitherto the halls had borne unmistakeable evidence of their origins, but the last vestiges of their old connections were now thrown aside, and they emerged in all the splendour of their new-born glory. The highest efforts of the architect, the designer and the decorator were enlisted in their service, and the gaudy and tawdry music hall of the past gave way to the resplendent "theatre of varieties" of the present day, with its classic exterior of marble and freestone, its lavishly appointed auditorium and its elegant and luxurious foyers and promenades brilliantly illuminated by myriad electric lights

— Charles Stuart and A. J. Park The Variety Stage (1895)

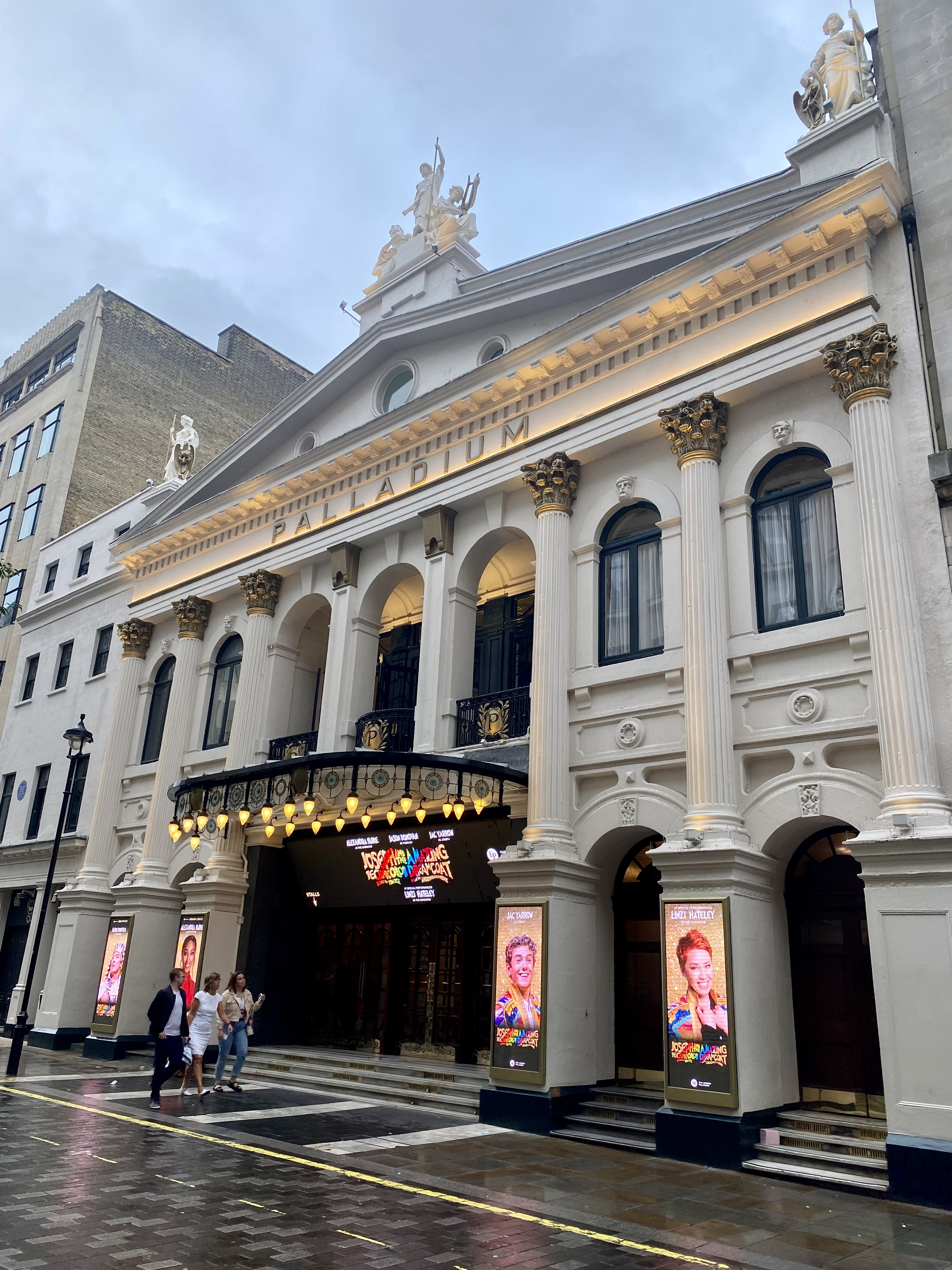
The London Palladium was built in 1910. A premier venue for variety theatre, it would first host the Royal Variety Performance in 1928 and Sunday Night at the London Palladium in 1955.

One of the most famous of these new palaces of pleasure in the West End was the Empire Leicester Square, built as a theatre in 1884 but acquiring a music hall licence in 1887. Like the nearby Alhambra this theatre appealed to the men of leisure by featuring alluring ballet dancers, and had a notorious promenade which was the resort of courtesans. Another spectacular example of the new variety theatre was the Tivoli in the Strand built 1888–1890 in an eclectic neo-Romanesque style with Baroque and Moorish-Indian embellishments. "The Tivoli" became a brand name for music halls all over the British Empire. During 1892, the Royal English Opera House, which had been a financial failure in Shaftesbury Avenue, applied for a music hall licence and was converted by Walter Emden into a grand music hall and renamed the Palace Theatre of Varieties, managed by Charles Morton. Denied by the newly created LCC permission to construct the promenade, which was such a popular feature of the Empire and Alhambra, the Palace compensated in the way of adult entertainment by featuring apparently nude women in tableaux vivants, though the concerned LCC hastened to reassure patrons that the girls who featured in these displays were actually wearing flesh-toned body stockings and were not naked at all.

One of the grandest of these new halls was the Coliseum Theatre built by Oswald Stoll in 1904 at the bottom of St Martin's Lane. This was followed by the London Palladium (1910) in Argyll Street. Both were designed by the prolific Frank Matcham. As music hall grew in popularity and respectability, and as the licensing authorities exercised ever firmer regulation, the original arrangement of a large hall with tables at which drink was served, changed to that of a drink-free auditorium. The acceptance of music hall as a legitimate cultural form was established by the first Royal Variety Performance before King George V during 1912 at the Palace Theatre. However, consistent with this new respectability the best-known music hall entertainer of the time, Marie Lloyd, was not invited, being deemed too "saucy" for presentation to the monarchy.

=== 'Music Hall War' of 1907 ===
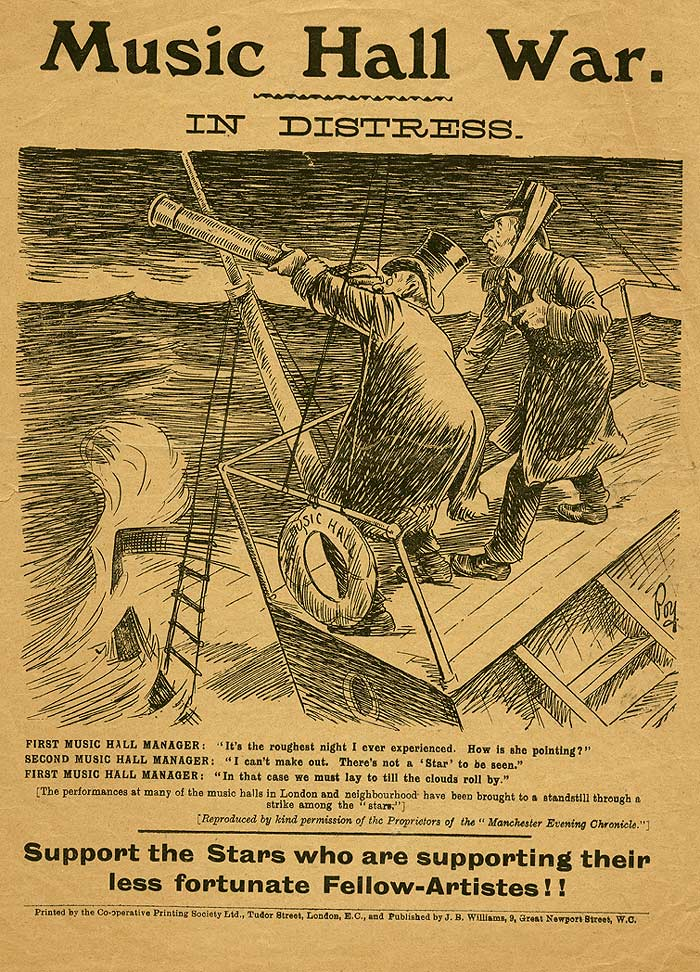
1907 poster from the Music Hall War between artists and theatre managers

The development of syndicates controlling a number of theatres, such as the Stoll circuit, increased tensions between employees and employers. On 22 January 1907, a dispute between artists, stage hands and managers of the Holborn Empire worsened. Strikes in other London and suburban halls followed, organised by the Variety Artistes' Federation. The strike lasted for almost two weeks and was known as the Music Hall War. It became extremely well known, and was advocated enthusiastically by the main spokesmen of the trade union and Labour movement – Ben Tillett and Keir Hardie for example. Picket lines were organized outside the theatres by the artistes, while in the provinces theatre management attempted to oblige artistes to sign a document promising never to join a trade union.

The strike ended in arbitration, which satisfied most of the main demands, including a minimum wage and maximum working week for musicians.

Several music hall entertainers such as Marie Dainton, Marie Lloyd, Arthur Roberts, Joe Elvin and Gus Elen were strong advocates of the strike, though they themselves earned enough not to be concerned personally in a material sense. Lloyd explained her advocacy:

We (the stars) can dictate our own terms. We are fighting not for ourselves, but for the poorer members of the profession, earning thirty shillings to £3 a week. For this they have to do double turns, and now matinées have been added as well. These poor things have been compelled to submit to unfair terms of employment, and I mean to back up the federation in whatever steps are taken.

— Marie Lloyd, on the Music Hall War

=== Recruiting ===
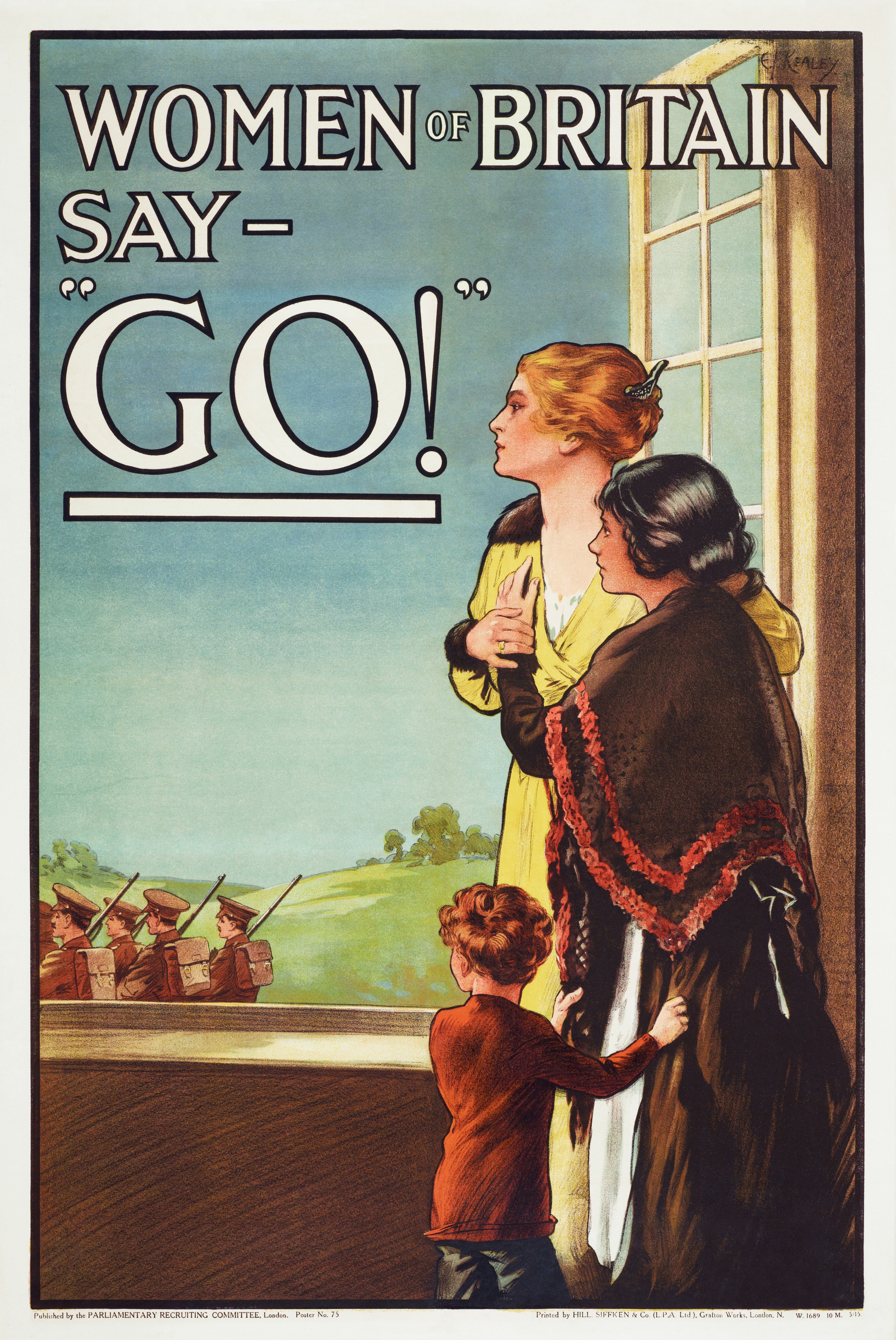
May 1915 poster by E. J. Kealey, from the Parliamentary Recruiting Committee

World War I may have been the high-water mark of music hall popularity. The artists and composers threw themselves into rallying public support and enthusiasm for the war effort. Patriotic music hall compositions such as "Keep the Home Fires Burning" (1914), "Pack up Your Troubles" (1915), "It's a Long Way to Tipperary" (1914) and "We Don't Want to Lose You (But We Think You Ought To Go)" (1914), were sung by music hall audiences, and sometimes by soldiers in the trenches.

Many songs promoted recruitment ("All the boys in khaki get the nice girls", 1915); others satirised particular elements of the war experience. "What did you do in the Great war, Daddy" (1919) criticised profiteers and slackers; Vesta Tilley's "I've got a bit of a blighty one" (1916) showed a soldier delighted to have a wound just serious enough to be sent home. The rhymes give a sense of grim humour ("When they wipe my face with sponges / and they feed me on blancmanges / I'm glad I've got a bit of a blighty one").

Tilley became more popular than ever during this time, when she and her husband, Walter de Frece, managed a military recruitment drive. In the guise of characters like 'Tommy in the Trench' and 'Jack Tar Home from Sea', Tilley performed songs such as "The army of today's all right" and "Jolly Good Luck to the Girl who Loves a Soldier". This is how she got the nickname Britain's best recruiting sergeant – young men were sometimes asked to join the army on stage during her show. She also performed in hospitals and sold war bonds. Her husband was knighted in 1919 for his own services to the war effort, and Tilley became Lady de Frece.

Once the reality of war began to sink home, the recruiting songs all but disappeared – the Greatest Hits collection for 1915 published by top music publisher Francis and Day contains no recruitment songs. After conscription was brought in 1916, songs dealing with the war spoke mostly of the desire to return home. Many also expressed anxiety about the new roles women were taking in society.

Possibly the most notorious of music hall songs from the First World War was "Oh! It's a lovely war" (1917), popularised by male impersonator Ella Shields.

=== Decline ===
Music hall continued during the interwar period, no longer the single dominant form of popular entertainment in Britain. The improvement of cinema, the development of radio, and the cheapening of the gramophone damaged its popularity greatly. It now had to compete with jazz, swing and big band dance music.

In 1914, the London County Council (LCC) enacted that drinking be banished from the auditorium into a separate bar and, during 1923, the separate bar was abolished by parliamentary decree. The exemption of the theatres from this latter act prompted some critics to denounce this legislation as an attempt to deprive the working classes of their pleasures, as a form of social control, whilst sparing the supposedly more responsible upper classes who patronised the theatres (though this could be due to the licensing restrictions brought about due to the Defence of the Realm Act 1914, which also applied to public houses). Even so, the music hall gave rise to such major stars as George Formby, Gracie Fields, Max Miller, Will Hay, and Flanagan and Allen during this period.

In the mid-1950s, rock and roll, whose performers initially topped music hall bills, attracted a young audience who had little interest in the music hall acts, while driving the older audience away. The final demise was competition from television, which grew popular after the Queen's coronation was televised. Some music halls tried to retain an audience by putting on striptease acts. In 1957, the playwright John Osborne delivered this elegy:

The music hall is dying, and with it, a significant part of England. Some of the heart of England has gone; something that once belonged to everyone, for this was truly a folk art.

— John Osborne, The Entertainer (1957)

Moss Empires, the largest British music hall chain, closed the majority of its theatres in 1960, closely followed by the death of music hall stalwart Max Miller in 1963, prompting one contemporary to write that: "Music-halls ... died this afternoon when they buried Max Miller". Miller himself had sometimes said that the genre would die with him. Many music hall performers, unable to find work, fell into poverty; some did not even have a home, having spent their working lives living in digs between performances.

Stage and film musicals, however, continued to be influenced by the music hall idiom, including Oliver!, Doctor Dolittle and My Fair Lady. The BBC series The Good Old Days, which ran for thirty years, recreated the music hall for the modern audience, and the Paul Daniels Magic Show allowed several speciality acts a television presence from 1979 to 1994. Aimed at a younger audience, but still owing a lot to the music hall heritage, was the late-1970s’ television series, The Muppet Show.

== Music halls of Paris ==
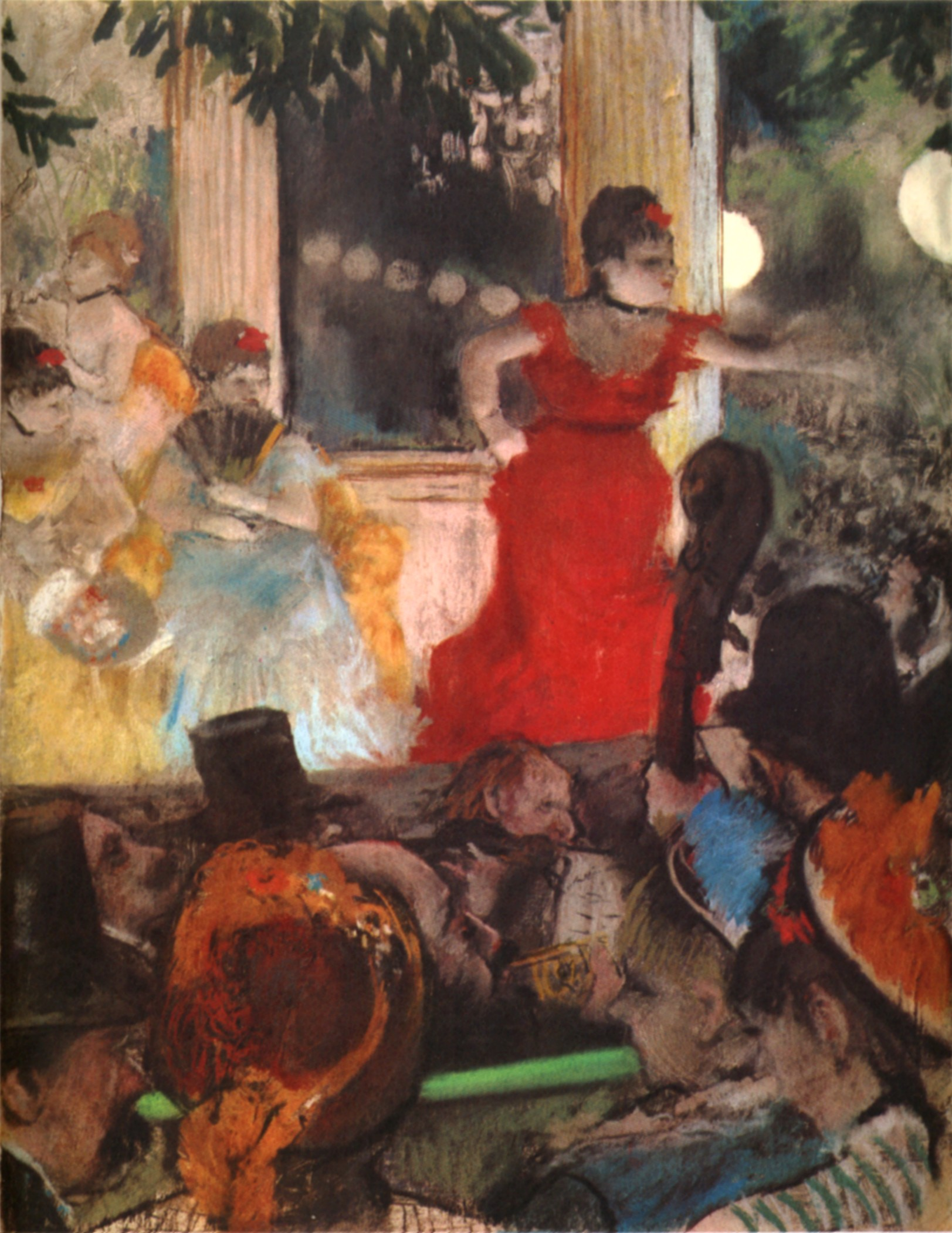
The Café-Concert by Edgar Degas (1876–77)

The music hall was first imported into France in its British form in 1862, but under the French law protecting the state theatres, performers could not wear costumes or recite dialogue, something only allowed in theaters. When the law changed in 1867, the Paris music hall flourished, and a half-dozen new halls opened, offering acrobats, singers, dancers, magicians, and trained animals. The first Paris music hall built specially for that purpose was the Folies-Bergere (1869); it was followed by the Moulin Rouge (1889), the Alhambra (1866), the first to be called a music hall, and the Olympia (1893). The Printania (1903) was a music-garden, open only in summer, with a theater, restaurant, circus, and horse-racing. Older theaters also transformed themselves into music halls, including the Bobino (1873), the Bataclan (1864), and the Alcazar (1858). At the beginning, music halls offered dance reviews, theater and songs, but gradually songs and singers became the main attraction.

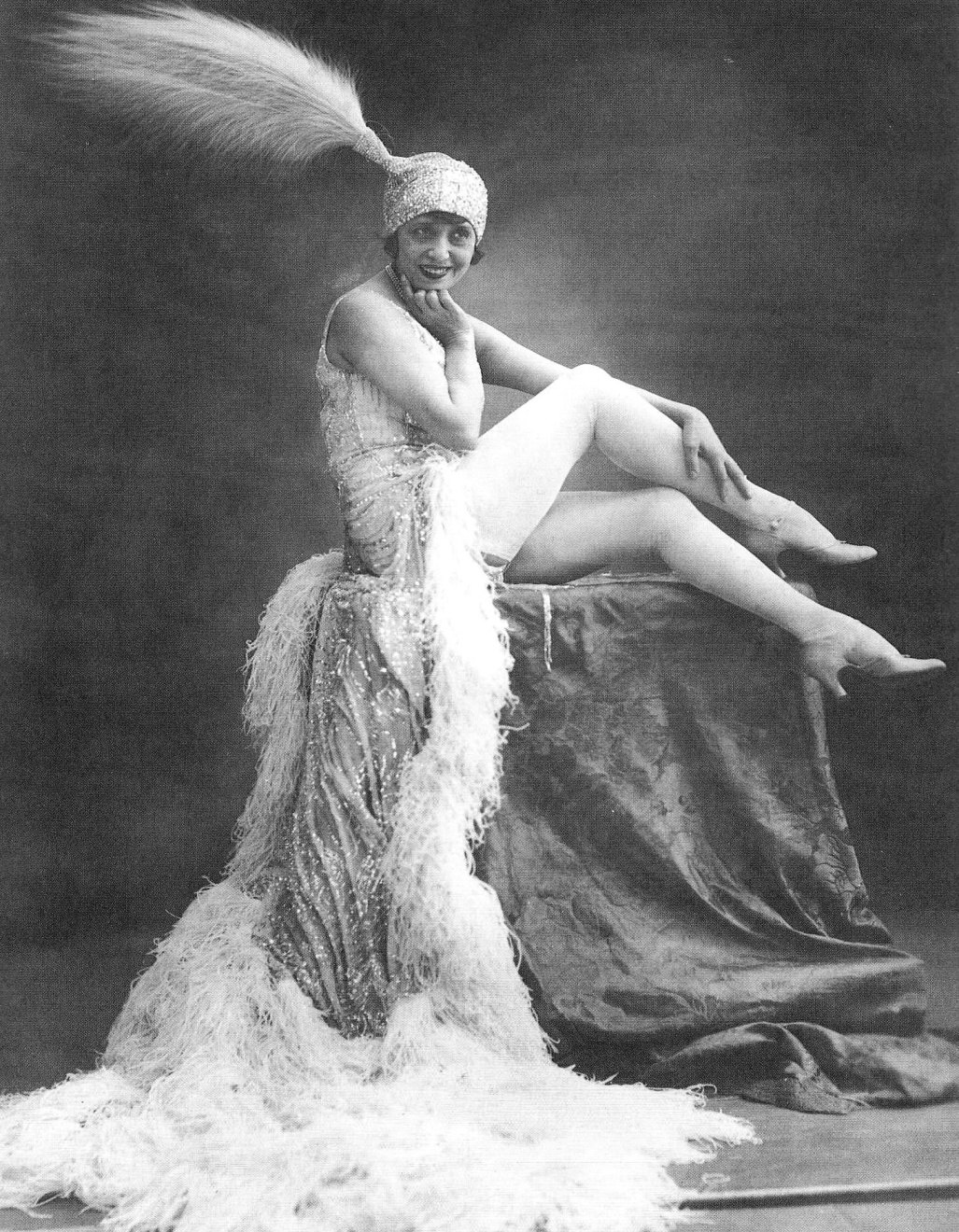
Mistinguett at the Moulin Rouge (1911)

Paris music halls all faced stiff competition in the interwar period from the most popular new form of entertainment, the cinema. They responded by offering more complex and lavish shows. In 1911, the Olympia had introduced the giant stairway as a set for its productions, an idea copied by other music halls. Gaby Deslys rose in popularity and created, with her dance partner Harry Pilcer, her most famous dance The Gaby Glide. The singer Mistinguett made her debut the Casino de Paris in 1895, and continued to appear regularly in the 1920s and 1930s at the Folies Bergère, Moulin Rouge and Eldorado. Her risqué routines captivated Paris, and she became one of the most highly-paid and popular French entertainers of her time.

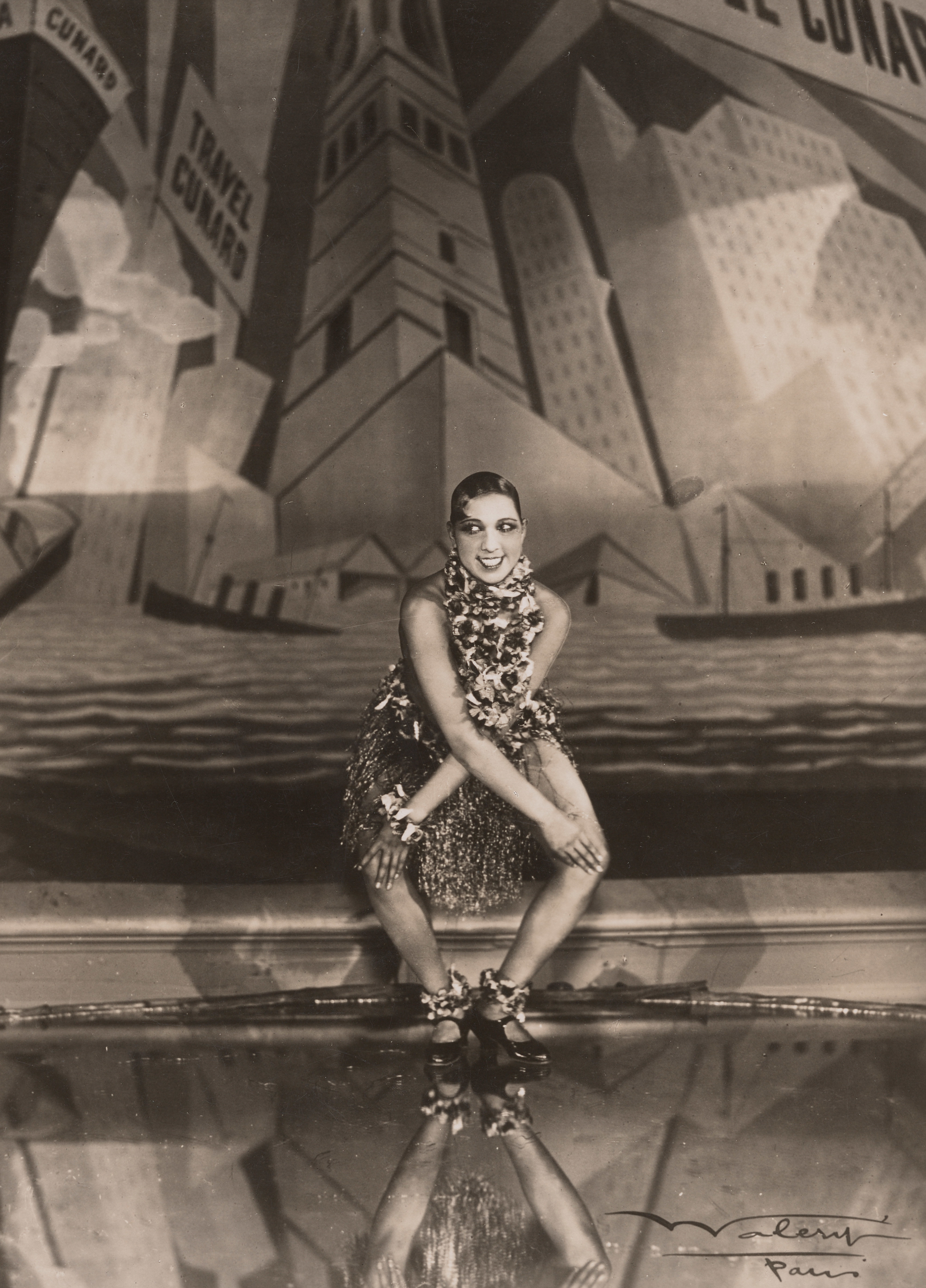
Josephine Baker dancing the Charleston, in the silent film La Folie du jour (1927), one of the acts in the revue of the same name at the Folies Bergère, Paris

One of the most popular entertainers in Paris during the period was the American singer Josephine Baker. Baker sailed to Paris, France. She first arrived in Paris in 1925 to perform in a show called La Revue nègre at the Théâtre des Champs-Élysées. She became an immediate success for her erotic dancing, and for appearing practically nude on stage. After a successful tour of Europe, she returned to France to star at the Folies Bergère, where she performed the "Banana Dance", wearing a costume consisting of a skirt made of a string of artificial bananas.

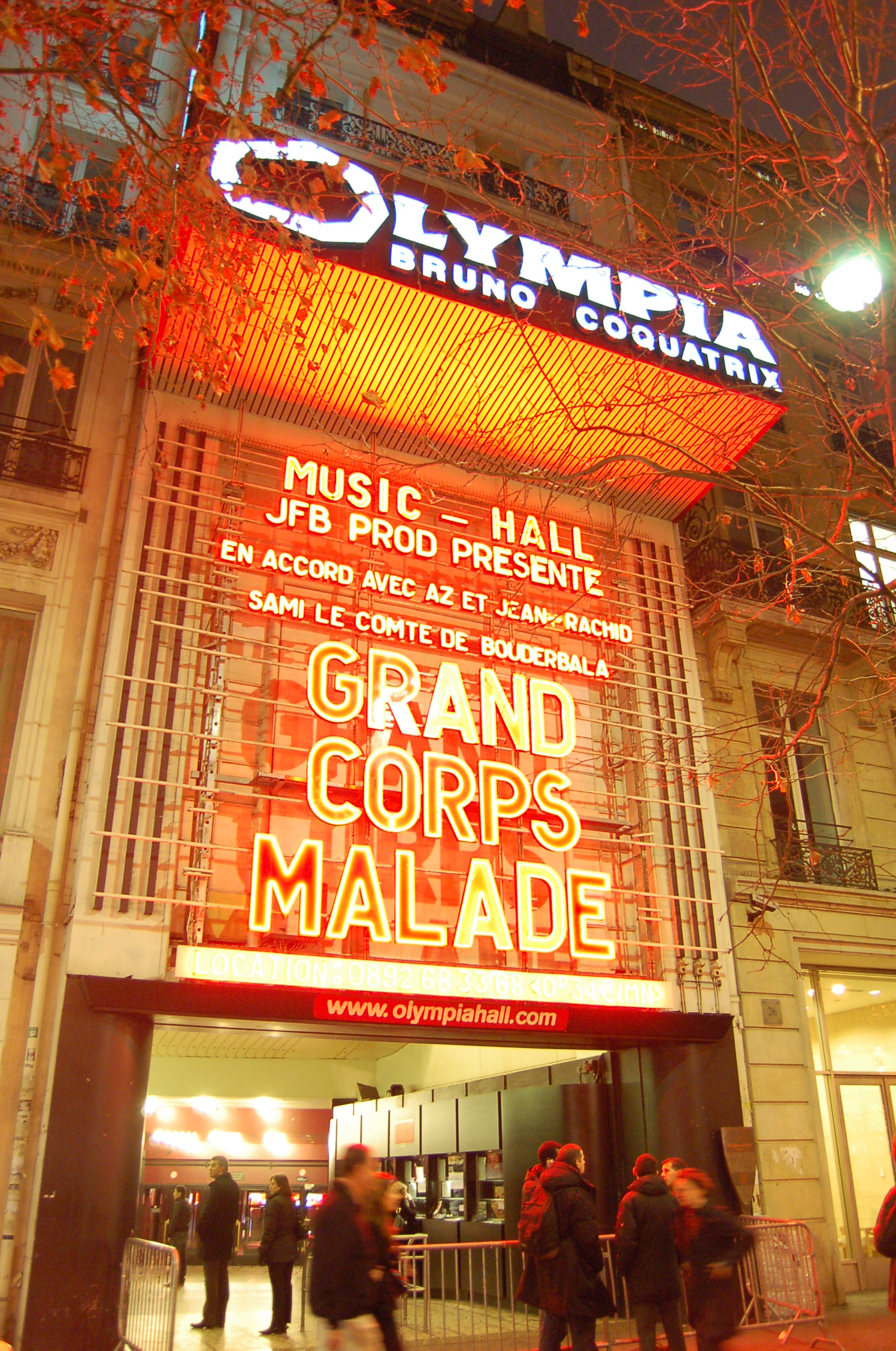
The Olympia Music Hall

The music halls suffered growing hardships in the 1930s. The Olympia was converted into a movie theater, and others closed. Others however continued to thrive. In 1937 and 1930, the Casino de Paris presented shows with Maurice Chevalier, who had already achieved success as an actor and singer in Hollywood.

In 1935, a twenty-year old singer named Édith Piaf was discovered in the Pigalle by nightclub owner Louis Leplée, whose club, Le Gerny, off the Champs-Élysées, was frequented by the upper and lower classes alike. He persuaded her to sing despite her extreme nervousness. Leplée taught her the basics of stage presence and told her to wear a black dress, which became her trademark apparel. Leplée ran an intense publicity campaign leading up to her opening night, attracting the presence of many celebrities, including Maurice Chevalier. Her nightclub appearance led to her first two records produced that same year, and the beginning of her career.

Competition from movies and television largely brought an end to the Paris music hall. However, a few still flourish, with tourists as their primary audience. Major music halls include the Folies-Bergere, Crazy Horse Saloon, Casino de Paris, Olympia, and Moulin Rouge.

== History of the songs ==
"By the 1850s music hall theatres solely dedicated to entertainment had evolved, providing a variety of acts with catchy songs and theatrical displays to entertain whilst people ate, drank and smoked. The audience members included a new urban working class emerging out of the context of the Industrial Revolution."

— "The Great British Music Hall", Historic UK.

The musical forms most associated with music hall evolved in part from traditional folk song and songs written for popular drama, becoming by the 1850s a distinct musical style. Subject matter became more contemporary and humorous, and accompaniment was provided by larger house-orchestras, as increasing affluence gave the lower classes more access to commercial entertainment, and to a wider range of musical instruments, including the piano. The consequent change in musical taste from traditional to more professional forms of entertainment, arose in response to the rapid industrialisation and urbanisation of previously rural populations in Britain during the Industrial Revolution. The newly created urban communities, cut off from their cultural roots, required new and readily accessible forms of entertainment.

Music halls were originally tavern rooms which provided entertainment, in the form of music and speciality acts, for their patrons. By the middle years of the nineteenth century, the first purpose-built music halls were being built in London. The halls created a demand for new and catchy popular songs, that could no longer be met from the traditional folk song repertoire. Professional songwriters were enlisted to fill the gap.

The emergence of a distinct music hall style can be credited to a fusion of musical influences. Music hall songs needed to gain and hold the attention of an often jaded and unruly urban audience. In America, from the 1840s, Stephen Foster had reinvigorated folk song with the admixture of Negro spiritual to produce a new type of popular song. Songs like "Old Folks at Home" (1851) and "Oh, Dem Golden Slippers" (James Bland, 1879]) spread round the globe, taking with them the idiom and appurtenances of the minstrel song. Typically, a music hall song consists of a series of verses sung by the performer alone, and a repeated chorus which carries the principal melody, and in which the audience is encouraged to join.

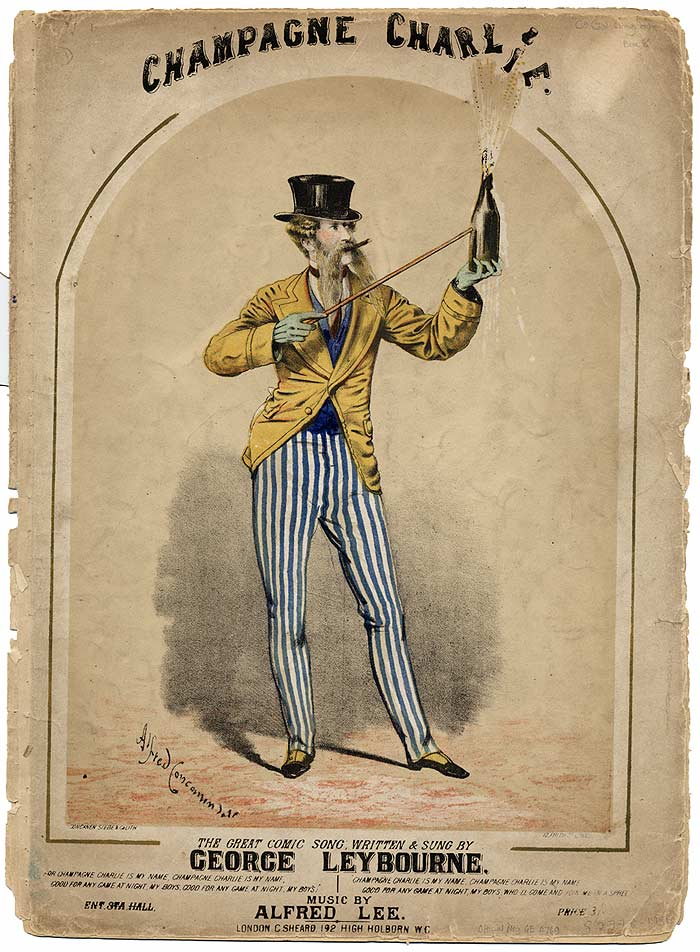
George Leybourne as 'Champagne Charlie'. Artwork by Alfred Concanen.

In Britain, the first music hall songs often promoted the alcoholic wares of the owners of the halls in which they were performed. Songs like "Glorious Beer", and the first major music hall success, "Champagne Charlie" (1867) had a major influence in establishing the new art form. The tune of "Champagne Charlie" became used for The Salvation Army hymn "Bless His Name, He Sets Me Free" (1881). When asked why the tune should be used like this, William Booth is said to have replied "Why should the devil have all the good tunes?" According to The Salvation Army, "The adoption of such music was soon put to full use. On Saturday afternoon, May 13, 1882, the congregation at the opening of the Clapton Congress Hall joined heartily in the chorus of Gipsy Smith's solo, 'O the Blood of Jesus cleanses white as snow' to the music of 'I traced her little footsteps in the snow'. There were no qualms of conscience. Many people gathered there knew none of the hymn tunes or gospel melodies used in the churches; the music hall had been their melody school."

Music hall songs were often composed with their working class audiences in mind. Songs like "My Old Man (Said Follow the Van)", "Wot Cher! Knocked 'em in the Old Kent Road", and "Waiting at the Church", expressed in melodic form situations with which the urban poor were familiar. Music hall songs could be romantic, patriotic, humorous or sentimental, as the need arose. The most popular music hall songs became the basis for the pub songs of the typical Cockney "knees up". Although a number of songs show a sharply ironic and knowing view of working-class life, there were, too, those which were repetitive, derivative, written quickly and sung to make a living rather than a work of art.

=== Famous music hall songs ===
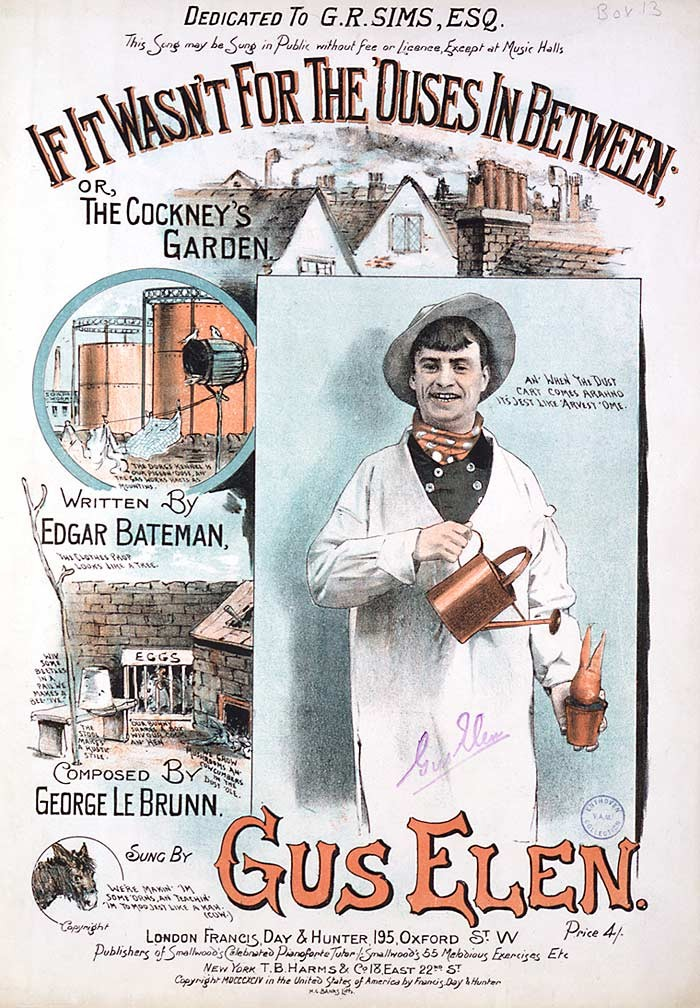
"If It Wasn't for the 'Ouses in Between", sung by Gus Elen

- "A Little of What You Fancy Does You Good* (George Arthurs, Fred W. Leigh), sung by Marie Lloyd
- "Any Old Iron" (Charles Collins; Terry Sheppard) sung by Harry Champion in 1911.
- "Ask a P'liceman" (E. W. Rogers and A. E. Durandeau) sung by James Fawn
- "Belgium Put the Kibosh on the Kaiser" (Alf Ellerton) sung by Mark Sheridan.
- "Boiled Beef and Carrots" (Charles Collins and Fred Murray) sung by Harry Champion.
- "The Boy I Love is Up in the Gallery" (George Ware) sung by Nelly Power, and Marie Lloyd.
- "Burlington Bertie from Bow" (William Hargreaves) sung by Ella Shields.
- "Daddy Wouldn't Buy Me a Bow Wow" (Joseph Tabrar) sung by Vesta Victoria.
- "Daisy Bell (Bicycle Built for Two)" (Harry Dacre) sung by Katie Lawrence.
- "Don't Dilly Dally on the Way" (Charles Collins and Fred W. Leigh) sung by Marie Lloyd.
- "Down at the Old Bull and Bush" (Harry von Tilzer; Andrew B. Sterling) sung by Florrie Forde.
- "Every Little Movement (Has a Meaning All Its Own)" (J. C. Moore; Fred E. Cliffe) sung by Marie Lloyd.
- "Good-bye-ee!" (R. P. Weston; Bert Lee) sung by Florrie Forde and Daisy Wood.
- "Has Anybody Here Seen Kelly?" (C. W. Murphy and Will Letters) sung by Florrie Forde.
- "Hello, Hello, Who's Your Lady Friend?" (Harry Fragson; Worton David; Bert Lee) sung by Harry Fragson, Mark Sheridan, etc.
- "I Belong to Glasgow", written and performed by Will Fyffe.

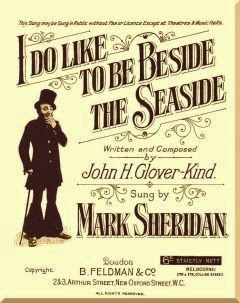
"I Do Like to Be Beside the Seaside", sung and recorded by Mark Sheridan in 1909

- "I Do Like to Be Beside the Seaside" (John A. Glover-Kind) sung by Mark Sheridan.
- "I'm Henery the Eighth, I Am" (1910) (Fred Murray and R. P. Weston) sung by Harry Champion.
- "It's a Long Way to Tipperary" (1912) (Jack Judge and Harry Williams) sung by John McCormack.
- "Let's All Go Down the Strand" (Harry Castling and C. W. Murphy) sung by Charles R. Whittle.
- "Lily of Laguna" (Leslie Stuart) sung by Eugene Stratton, and later G. H. Elliott.
- "The Daring Young Man on the Flying Trapeze" (George Leybourne; Gaston Lyle; arr. Alfred Lee) sung by George Leybourne.
- "The Man Who Broke the Bank at Monte Carlo" (1891) (Fred Gilbert) sung by Charles Coborn.
- "My Old Dutch" (Albert Chevalier; Charles Ingle) sung by Albert Chevalier.
- "Nellie Dean" (Henry W. Armstrong) sung by Gertie Gitana.
- "Oh! Mr Porter" (George Le Brunn and Thomas Le Brunn) sung by Marie Lloyd, and Norah Blaney.
- "Pack Up Your Troubles in Your Old Kit-Bag" (Felix Powell) sung by Florrie Forde.
- "Ship Ahoy! (All the Nice Girls Love a Sailor)", performed by Hetty King
- "Ta-ra-ra Boom-de-ay" (Harry J. Sayers) sung by Lottie Collins.
- "Waiting at the Church" (Henry E. Pether; Fred W. Leigh) sung by Vesta Victoria.
- "Where Did You Get That Hat?" (Joseph J. Sullivan, 1888; words rewritten 1901 by James Rolmaz) sung by J. C. Heffron (1857–1934)

=== Music hall songwriters ===
- Fred Albert (1844–1886), "topical vocalist" who wrote his own material; titles included "Bradshaw's Guide" and "The Mad Butcher"; popular in the 1870s.
- Harry Castling (1865–1933), lyricist of "Let's All Go Down The Strand" sung by Charles R. Whittle and "Don't Have Any More, Mrs More" sung by Lily Morris.
- Harry Clifton (1832–1872), prolific singer-songwriter whose titles include "Polly Perkins of Paddingion Green".
- Charles Collins (1874–1923), composer of songs including "Boiled Beef and Carrots", "Any Old Iron", and "Don't Dilly Dally on the Way".
- Harry Dacre (1857–1922), composer of "Daisy Bell (Bicycle Built for Two)" (1892) and "I'll Be Your Sweetheart" (1899).
- Stephen Collins Foster (1826–1864), American parlour music and minstrel composer.
- Noel Gay (1898–1954), composer of "The Lambeth Walk" (1937) and "Leaning on a Lamp-post" (1937).
- Fred Godfrey (1880–1953), composer of "Who Were You With Last Night?" sung by Mark Sheridan, and "Now I Have To Call Him Father" sung by Vesta Victoria.
- William Hargreaves (1880–1941), wrote the 1915 parody "Burlington Bertie from Bow" for his wife Ella Shields.
- F. Clifford Harris (1875–1949), lyricist (working often with James W. Tate) of "I Was A Good Little Girl" and "A Broken Doll", both sung by Clarice Mayne and That.
- Tom Hudson (1791–1844), writer and performer of comic songs
- G. W. Hunt (c.1837–1904), prolific composer and lyricist best known for G. H. MacDermott's "War Song" ("By Jingo if we do...")
- Harry Lauder (1870–1950), writer of his own popular songs, "I Love A Lassie" and "Stop yer Tickling, Jock".
- George Le Brunn (1864–1905), composer of "Oh! Mr Porter" sung by Marie Lloyd, and "If It Wasn't for the 'Ouses in Between" and "It's a Great Big Shame" sung by Gus Elen.
- Bert Lee (1880–1946), composer of "Good-bye-ee!" sung by Florrie Forde and Daisy Wood, and "Hello Hello, Who’s Your Lady Friend?" sung by Mark Sheridan.
- Fred W. Leigh (1871–1924), lyricist of "The Galloping Major", "Waiting at the Church", "A Little of What You Fancy Does You Good" and "Don't Dilly Dally on the Way", among others.
- Arthur Lloyd (1839–1904), music hall's first prolific singer-songwriter.
- Arthur J. Mills (1872–1919), lyricist of "When I Take My Morning Promenade" sung by Marie Lloyd, and "Ship Ahoy! (All The Nice Girls Love A Sailor)" sung by Hetty King.
- C. W. Murphy (1875–1913), composer of "Has Anybody Here Seen Kelly?" sung by Florrie Forde and "Hello Hello, Who’s Your Lady Friend?" sung by Mark Sheridan.
- Edward W. Rogers (1864–1913), lyricist of "Ask a P'liceman" sung by James Fawn, and composer of Alec Hurley's original "The Lambeth Walk" (1899).
- George Alex Stevens (1875–1954), composer of "On Mother Kelly's Doorstep" sung by Randolph Sutton.
- Bennett Scott (1875–1930), composer of "When I Take My Morning Promenade" sung by Marie Lloyd, and "Ship Ahoy! All the Nice Girls Love a Sailor" sung by Ella Retford.
- Leslie Stuart (1863–1928), composer of "Lily of Laguna" and "Little Dolly Daydream" sung by Eugene Stratton.
- Joseph Tabrar (1857–1931), prolific composer whose titles included "Daddy Wouldn't Buy Me a Bow Wow" sung by Vesta Victoria.
- James W. Tate (1875–1922) composer of "I Was A Good Little Girl" and "A Broken Doll", both sung by Clarice Mayne and That.
- R. P. Weston (1878–1936), composer of "Good-bye-ee!" sung by Florrie Forde and Daisy Wood, and "I'm Henery the Eighth, I Am" sung by Harry Champion.
- Harry Wincott (1867–1947), composer of "When The Old Dun Cow Caught Fire" sung by Harry Champion, and (arguably) "Mademoiselle from Armentières".

== Music hall comedy ==
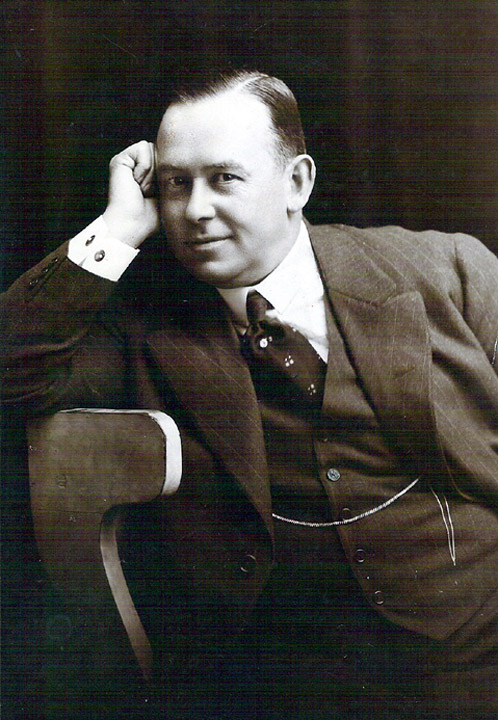
In Fred Karno's Mumming Birds sketch (1904), a pie in the face appears in the 'Frivolity music hall scene'.

The typical music hall comedian was a man or woman, usually dressed in character to suit the subject of the song, or sometimes attired in absurd and eccentric style. Until well into the twentieth century, the acts were essentially vocal, with songs telling a story, accompanied by a minimum of patter. They included a variety of genres, including:

- Lion comiques: essentially, men dressed as "toffs", who sang songs about drinking champagne, going to the races, going to the ball, womanising and gambling, and living the life of an aristocrat.
- Male and female impersonators, the latter more in the style of a pantomime dame than a modern drag queen. Nevertheless, these included some more sophisticated performers such as Vesta Tilley and Ella Shields, whose male impersonations communicated real social commentary.

Music hall impresario Fred Karno developed a form of sketch comedy without dialogue in the 1890s, and in 1904, Karno's Komics produced a new sketch for the Hackney Empire in London called Mumming Birds, which included the pie in the face gag among other new innovations. Immensely popular, it became the longest-running sketch the music halls produced. Charlie Chaplin and Stan Laurel were among the music hall comedians who worked for Karno, and on the latter Simon Louvish writes, "Chaplin remained the great observer of the absurdity of life's endless struggles, an actor trained with Karno's "Speechless Comedians" to express each thought and attitude in mime."

== Speciality acts ==
The vocal content of the music hall bills, was, from the beginning, accompanied by many other kinds of act, some of them quite weird and wonderful. These were known collectively as speciality acts (abbreviated to "spesh"), which, over time, have included:

- Adagio: essentially a sort of cross between a dance act and a juggling act, consisting usually of a male dancer who threw a slim, pretty young girl around. Some aspects of modern dance choreography evolved from Adagio acts.
- Aerial acts, of the sort usually seen at the circus
- Animal acts: Talking dogs, flea circuses, and all manner of animals doing tricks.
- Cycling acts: again, a development of a circus act, consisting of either a solo or a troupe of trick cyclists. There was even a seven-piece cycling band called Seven Musical Savonas, who played fifty instruments between them, and Kaufmann's Cycling Beauties, a troupe of girls in Victorian swim wear.

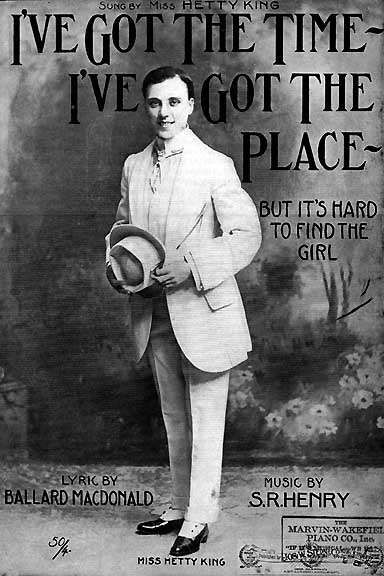
Male impersonator Hetty King

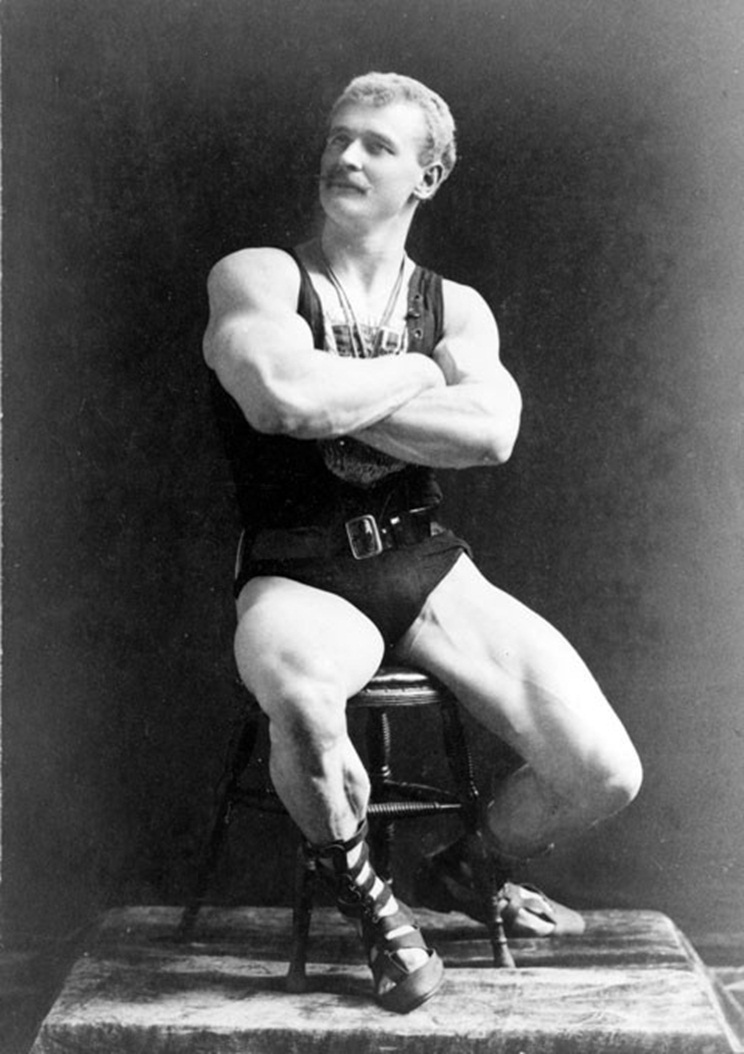
Strongman Eugen Sandow

- Drag artists: female entertainers dressed as men, such as Vesta Tilley, Ella Shields, and Hetty King; or male entertainers dressed as women, such as Bert Erroll, Julian Eltinge, Danny La Rue, and Rex Jameson in the character of Mrs Shufflewick
- Electric acts, using the newly discovered phenomenon of static electricity to produce tricks such as lighting gas jets and setting fire to handkerchiefs through the performers fingertips. Dr Walford Bodie (1869/70-1939) was the most notable.
- Escapologists, such as Harry Houdini.
- Fire eaters and other eating acts, such as eating glass, razor blades, goldfish, etc.
- Juggling and plate spinning acts. Another variation was the Diabolo.
- Knife throwing and sword swallowing. The most spectacular of its time was the Victorina Troupe, who swallowed a sword fired from a rifle.
- Magic acts, such as David Devant.
- A memory act of the type performed by Datas, "the Living Encyclopaedia" (1875–1956).
- Mentalism acts. Commonly a male mentalist, blindfolded on stage, and an attractive female assistant passing among the audience. The assistant would collect objects from the audience, and the mentalist would identify each by "reading" the assistants mind. This was usually accomplished by a clever system of codes and clues from the assistant.
- Mime artists and impressionists.
- Comic pianists, such as John Orlando Parry and George Grossmith.
- Puppet acts, including human puppets and living doll acts.
- Shadow puppet acts.
- Stilt walkers.
- Strongmen such as Eugen Sandow, and strongwomen such as Joan Rhodes, performing feats of strength.
- Trampoline acts.
- Ventriloquists, or Vent acts as they were called in the business, such as Fred Russell, Arthur Prince, Frank Travis, Coram (Thomas Mitchell).
- Wild West/Cowboy acts.
- Wrestling and jujitsu exhibitions were both popular speciality acts, forming the basis of modern professional wrestling.

== Music hall performers ==
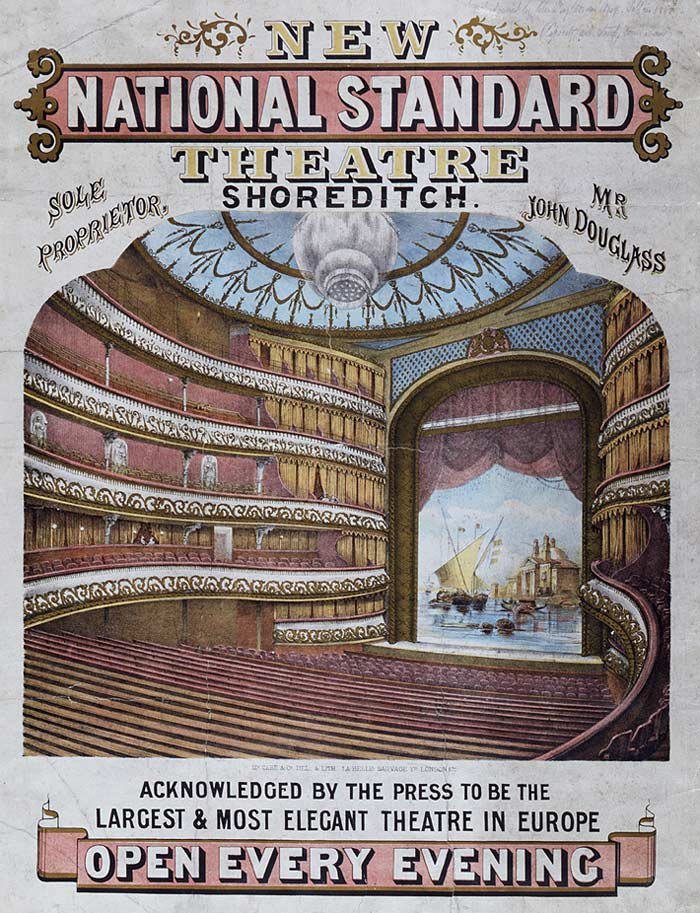
1867 Poster from the National Standard Theatre, Shoreditch, London (1837–1940). Not strictly a music hall, but a theatre where many music hall artists performed their acts.

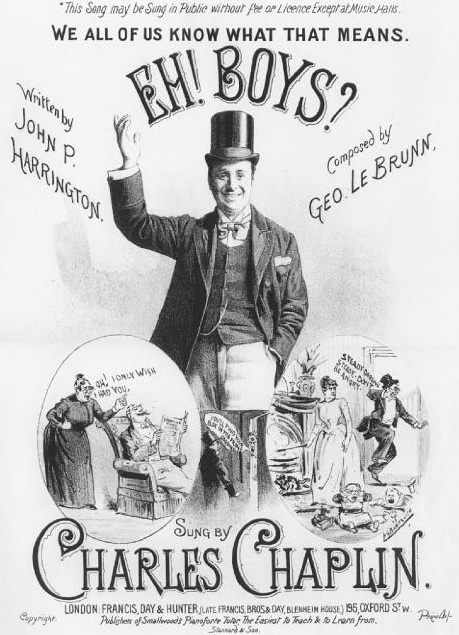
Charles Chaplin Sr. sheet music, c. 1890 published in London by Francis, Day & Hunter Ltd. A music hall star of the 1890s, he introduced his son Charlie to the entertainment industry when, in 1899, he got him a role in The Eight Lancashire Lads clog dancers troupe.

- Fred Albert (1843–1886)
- Fred Barnes (1885–1938)
- Ida Barr (1882–1967)
- Bessie Bellwood (1856–1896)
- Herbert Campbell (1844–1904)
- Aimée Campton (1882–1930)
- Kate Carney (1869–1950)
- Harry Champion (1866–1942)
- Charles Chaplin Sr. (1863–1901)
- Charlie Chaplin (1889–1977)
- Sydney Chaplin (1885–1965)
- Albert Chevalier (1861–1923)
- George H. Chirgwin (1854–1922)
- Charles Coborn (1852–1945)
- Cullen and Carthy Johnnie Cullen (1868–1929) and Arthur Carthy (1868–1943)
- Johnny Danvers (1860-1939)
- Daisy Dormer (1883–1947)
- Leo Dryden (1864–1939)
- T. E. Dunville (1867–1924)
- Gus Elen (1862–1940)
- Joe Elvin (1862–1935)
- G. H. Elliott (1882–1962)
- Will Evans (1866–1931)
- Florrie Forde (1875–1940)
- George Formby, Sr. (1876–1921)
- Harry Fragson (1869–1913)
- Will Fyffe (1885–1947)
- Charles Godfrey (1851–1900)
- Will Hay (1888–1949)
- Jenny Hill (1848–1896)
- Stanley Holloway (1890–1982)
- Fred Karno (1866–1941)
- Marie Kendall (1873–1964)
- Hetty King (1883–1972)
- R. G. Knowles (1858–1919)
- Lillie Langtry (1853–1929)
- George Lashwood (1863–1942)
- Sir Harry Lauder (1870–1950)
- Stan Laurel (1890–1965)
- Katie Lawrence (1868–1913)
- Tom Leamore (1866–1939)
- Dan Leno (1860–1904)
- George Leybourne (1842–1884)
- Marie Loftus (1857–1940)
- Cecilia Loftus (1876–1943)
- Jack Lotto (1857–1944)
- Little Tich (1867–1928)
- Arthur Lloyd (1839–1904)
- Marie Lloyd (1870–1922)
- Adelaide Macarte (1879–1908)
- Cecilia Macarte (1880–)
- Julia Macarte (1878–1958)
- Tom Major-Ball (1879–1962)
- Ernie Mayne (1871–1937)
- Mark Melford (1850–1914)
- George Mozart (1864–1947)
- Jolly John Nash (1828–1901)
- Denise Orme (1885–1960)
- Edmund Payne (1864–1914)
- Jack Pleasants (1875–1924)
- Nelly Power (1854–1887)
- Peggy Pryde (1869–1943)
- Ella Retford (1885–1962)
- Arthur Roberts (1852–1933)
- George Robey (1869–1954)
- Malcolm Scott (1872–1929)
- Truly Shattuck (1875–1954)
- Ella Shields (1879–1952)
- Mark Sheridan (1864–1918)
- J. H. Stead (c.1826–1886)
- Eugene Stratton (1861–1918)
- Harry Tate (1872–1940)
- Sam Torr (1849–1923)
- Vesta Tilley (1864–1952)
- Arthur Tracy (1899–1997)
- Alfred Vance (1839–1888)
- Vesta Victoria (1873–1951)
- Fawdon Vokes (1844–1904)
- Fred Vokes (1846–1888)
- Jessie Vokes (1848–1884)
- Rosina Vokes (1854–1894)
- Victoria Vokes (1853–1894)
- Vulcana (1874–1946)
- Harry Weldon (1881–1930)
- Daisy Wood (1877–1961) (and the Sisters Lloyd)
- Billy Williams (1878–1915)

== Cultural influences of music hall: Literature, drama, screen, and later music ==
The music hall has been evoked in many films, plays, TV series, and books.

- In James Joyce's short story "The Boarding House" (1914), Mrs Mooney's boarding-house in Hardwicke Street accommodates "occasionally (...) artistes from the music halls". The Sunday night "reunions" with Jack Mooney in the drawing-room create a certain atmosphere.
- About half of the film Those Were the Days (1934) is set in a music hall. It was based on a farce by Pinero and features the music hall acts of Lily Morris, Harry Bedford, the gymnasts Gaston & Andre, G. H. Elliott, Sam Curtis, and Frank Boston & Betty.
- A music hall with a 'memory man' act provides a pivotal plot device in the classic 1935 Alfred Hitchcock thriller The 39 Steps.
- The Arthur Askey comedy film I Thank You (1941) features old-time music hall star Lily Morris as an ex-music hall artiste now ennobled as "Lady Randall". In the last scene of the film, however, she reverts to type and gives a rendition of "Waiting at the Church" at an impromptu concert at Aldwych tube station organised by Askey and his side-kick Richard "Stinker" Murdoch.
- The Victorian era of music hall was celebrated by the 1944 film, Champagne Charlie.
- The comedy of Benny Hill, first seen on British television in 1951, was heavily influenced by the traditions and conventions of music hall comedy and he kept those traditions (comedy, songs, patter, pantomime, and female impersonations) alive on his more-than-100 television specials broadcast from 1955 through 1991.
- Charlie Chaplin's 1915 film A Night in the Show brings one of the classic music hall comedy sketches, Mumming Birds, known as A Night in an English Music Hall when Chaplin performed it on tour, into his film work. His 1952 film Limelight, set in 1914 London, evokes the music hall world of Chaplin's youth where he performed as a comedian before he achieved worldwide celebrity as a film star in America. The film depicts the last performance of a washed-up music hall clown called Calvero at The Empire theatre, Leicester Square. The film premiered at the Empire Cinema, which was built on the same site as the Empire theatre.
- The Good Old Days (1953 to 1983) was a popular BBC television light entertainment programme recorded live at the Leeds City Varieties, which aimed to recreate an authentic atmosphere of the Victorian–Edwardian music hall with songs and sketches of the era performed by present-day performers in the style of the original artistes. The audience dressed in period costume and joined in the singing, especially the singing of Down at the Old Bull and Bush which closed the show. The show was compered by Leonard Sachs, who introduced the acts. In the course of its run, it featured about 2,000 artists. The show was first broadcast on 20 July 1953. The Good Old Days was inspired by the success of the Ridgeway's Late Joys at the Players' Theatre Club in London: a private members' club that ran fortnightly programmes of variety acts in London's West End.
- In 1957, Peter Sellers recorded a rendition of "Any Old Iron" in a voice he created for the BBC's The Goon Show, Willium "Mate" Cobblers. A scene in the 1992 biopic Chaplin where Charlie and Syd Chaplin meet just before Charlie's audition for Mr. Karno, they greet each other by singing the chorus to "Any Old Iron".
- John Osborne's play The Entertainer (1957) portrays the life and work of a failing, third-rate music hall stage performer who tries to keep his career going even as his personal life falls apart. The story is set at the time of the Suez Crisis in 1956, against the backdrop of the dying music hall tradition, and has been seen as symbolic of Britain's general post-war decline, its loss of its Empire, its power, and its cultural confidence and identity. It was made into a film in 1960 starring Laurence Olivier in the title role of Archie Rice.
- In Grip of the Strangler (1958), set in Victorian London, the raunchy can-can dancers and loose women of the sleazy "Judas Hole" music hall are terrorised by the Haymarket Strangler, played by Boris Karloff.
- The variously titled Ken Dodd TV series recorded between 1959 and 1988 were heavily influenced by those traditions; up to his death in 2018, Dodd continued to tour a variety show including quick-fire stand-up comedy, songs, ventriloquism and sometimes other speciality acts.
- The Theatre of the Absurd (c. late 1950s) was influenced by music hall in its use of comedy, with avant-garde cultural forms (such as surrealism) being a more obvious influence.
- In Lawrence of Arabia (1962), Lawrence (Peter O'Toole) sings "The Man Who Broke the Bank at Monte Carlo" while riding across the desert. In the 2017 sci-fi Alien: Covenant, in mimicry of his idol Lawrence of Arabia, the android David sings the words of the song's title while he is cutting his own hair in the mirror.
- The 1964 film Mary Poppins, set in Edwardian London, features music and lyrics by brothers Richard M. Sherman and Robert B. Sherman who took inspiration from Edwardian music hall music.
- J. B. Priestley's 1965 novel Lost Empires also evokes the world of Edwardian music hall just before the start of World War I; the title is a reference to the Empire theatres (as well as foreshadowing the decline of the British Empire itself). It was adapted as a television miniseries, shown in both the UK and in the U.S. as a PBS presentation. Priestley's 1929 novel The Good Companions, set in the same period, follows the lives of the members of a "concert party" or touring Pierrot troupe.
- Herman's Hermits, led by Peter Noone, incorporated music hall into their repertoire, scoring a major hit with their cover of the Harry Champion music hall standard, "I'm Henery the Eighth, I Am", in 1965 (Noone's version includes only the chorus; not the many verses of the original).
- Music hall had a discernible influence on the Beatles through Paul McCartney, himself the son of a performer in the music hall tradition (Jim McCartney, who led Jim Mac's Jazz Band). Examples of McCartney's songs to display a music hall influence include: "When I'm Sixty-Four" (1967), "Your Mother Should Know" (1967), "Honey Pie" (1968), and "Maxwell's Silver Hammer" (1969); in the solo period: "You Gave Me the Answer" (1975), and "Baby's Request" (1979).
- In 1969, Monty Python's Flying Circus debuted on the BBC, with Charles Isherwood writing that Monty Python, like Benny Hill, "derived their sketch formats in part from the rowdy tradition of the music hall."
- The parodic film Oh! What a Lovely War (1969), based on the stage musical Oh, What a Lovely War! (1963) by Joan Littlewood's Theatre Workshop, featured the music hall turns and songs that had provided support for the British war effort in World War I.
- The popular ITV television series Upstairs, Downstairs (1971–1975) and its spin-off Thomas & Sarah (1979) each dealt frequently with the world of the Edwardian music hall, sometimes through references to actual Edwardian era performers such as Vesta Tilley, or to characters on the show attending performances, and other times through the experiences of the popular character Sarah Moffat, who left domestic service several times and often ended up going on stage to support herself when she did.
- British rockers Queen incorporated music hall styles into several of their songs, such "Killer Queen" (1974) and "Good Old-Fashioned Lover Boy" (1976).
- Garry Bushell's punk pathetique band, The Gonads (formed 1977), did rock versions of music hall songs. Many punk pathetique acts were indebted to the music hall tradition.
- Between 1978 and 1984, BBC television broadcast two series of programmes called The Old Boy Network. These featured a star (usually a music hall/variety performer, but also some younger turns like Eric Sykes) performing some of their best known routines while giving a slide show of their life story. Artistes featured included Arthur Askey, Tommy Trinder, Sandy Powell, and Chesney Allen.
- In Vivian Stanshall and Ki Longfellow-Stanshall's musical, Stinkfoot, a Comic Opera (1985), the lead performer is an ageing music hall artiste named Soliquisto.
- Sarah Waters's book Tipping the Velvet (1998) revolves around the world of music halls in the late Victorian era, and in particular around two fictional "mashers" (drag kings) named Kitty Butler and Nan King.
- The modern Players' Theatre Club provides a brief impression of contemporary music hall in the film The Fourth Angel (2001), where Jeremy Irons' character creates an alibi by visiting a show.
- The name of music hall singer Ida Barr (1882–1967) was appropriated some 40 years after her death by Christopher Green for an unrelated, non-tribute drag act.
- The album Between Today and Yesterday by Alan Price (previously keyboard player for The Animals) was influenced by pre-rock 'n' roll music styles, especially music hall.
- Popular music duo Chas & Dave did much to revive the spirit of music hall in their albums and songs throughout the 1980s. They wrote and recorded "Harry Was A Champion" – a tribute song to the stars of music hall – for their 1984 album Well Pleased.

== Surviving music halls ==
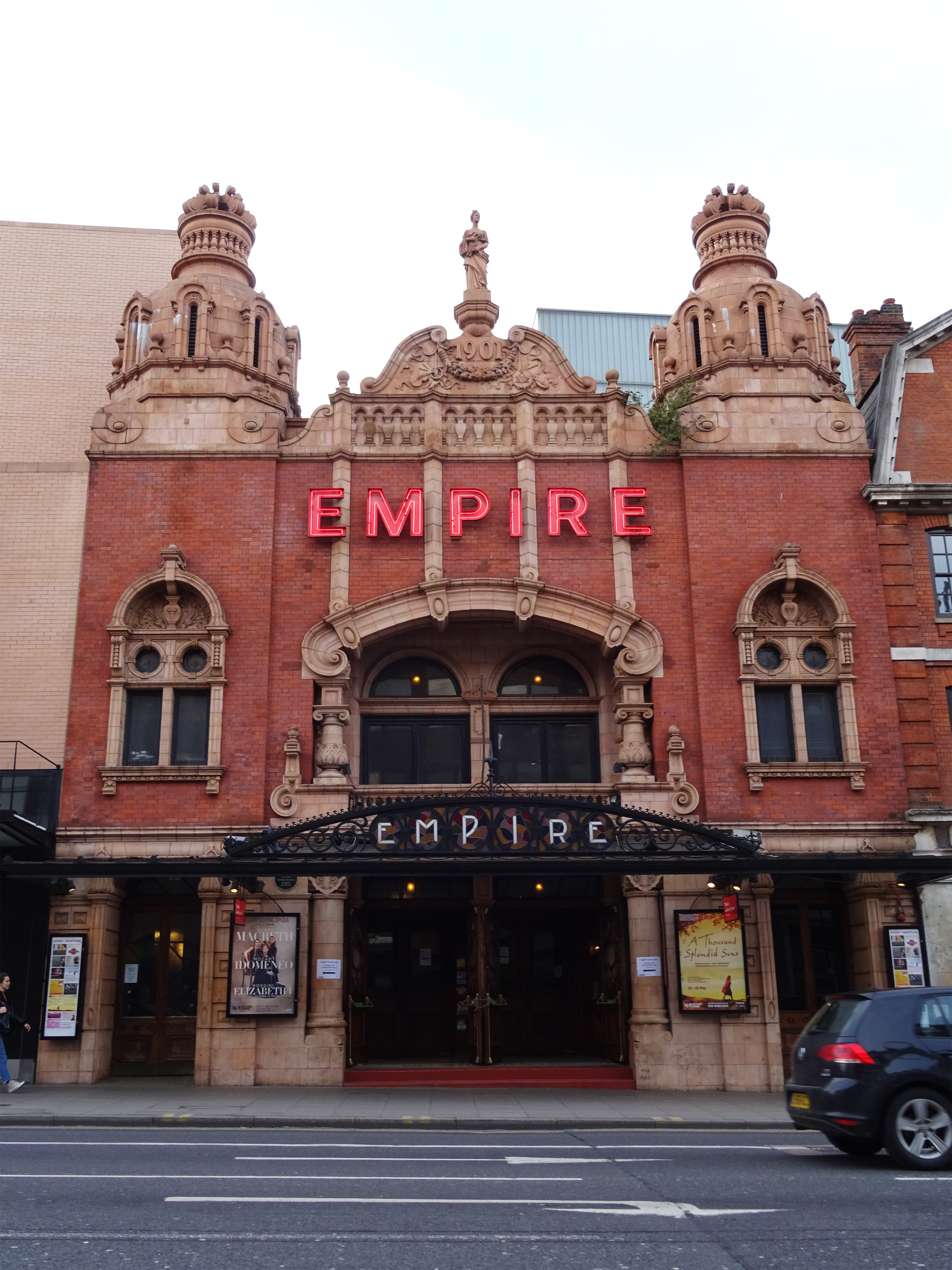
The Hackney Empire, 2019. Samantha Ellis in The Guardian writes, "From Chaplin to Gracie, the Hackney Empire played host to the greatest stars of music hall".

London was the centre of music hall with hundreds of venues, often in the entertainment rooms of public houses. With the decline in popularity of music hall, many were abandoned, or converted to other uses such as cinemas, and their interiors lost. There are a number of purpose-built survivors, including the Hackney Empire, an outstanding example of the late music hall period (Frank Matcham 1901). This has been restored to its Moorish splendour and now provides an eclectic programme of events from opera to "Black Variety Nights". The architectural writer Nikolaus Pevsner called the Grade II-listed Hackney Empire "among the best-surviving Edwardian suburban variety theatres". A mile to the south is Hoxton Hall, an 1863 example of the saloon style. It is unrestored but maintained in its original layout, and currently used as a community centre and theatre. In the neighbouring borough, Collins Music Hall (built about 1860) still stands on the north side of Islington Green. The hall closed in the 1960s and currently forms part of a bookshop.

In Clapham, The Grand, originally the Grand Palace of Varieties (1900), has been restored, but its interior reflects its modern use as a music venue and nightclub. The Greenwich Theatre was originally the Rose and Crown Music Hall (1855), and later became Crowder's Music Hall and Temple of Varieties. The building has been extensively modernised and little of the original layout remains.

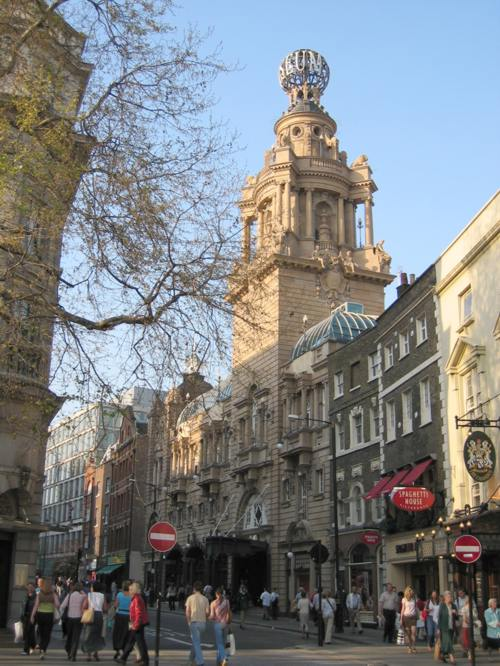
1904 London Coliseum, Matcham theatre with London's widest proscenium arch

In the nondescript Grace's Alley, off Cable Street, Stepney, stands Wilton's Music Hall. This 1858 example of the "giant pub hall" survived use as a church, fire, flood and war intact, but was virtually derelict, after its use as a rag warehouse, in the 1960s. The Wilton's Music Hall Trust has embarked on a fund-raising campaign to restore the building. In June 2007, the World Monuments Fund added the building to its list of the world's "100 most endangered sites". The building was for many years on Historic England's Heritage at Risk Register, but following its successful restoration was removed from list in 2016 and after 20 years on the register it was named as one of the successful rescues. The music video of the Frankie Goes to Hollywood single "Relax" was shot here. Many of these buildings can be seen as part of the annual London Open House event.

There are also surviving music halls outside London, a notable example being the Leeds City Varieties (1865) with a preserved interior. This was used for many years as the setting for the BBC television variety show The Good Old Days, based on the music hall genre. The Alhambra Theatre, Bradford was built in 1914 for theatre impresario Francis Laidler, and later owned by the Stoll-Moss Empire. It was restored in 1986, and is a fine example of the late Edwardian style. It is now a receiving theatre for touring productions and opera.

In Nottingham, the Malt Cross music hall retains its restored cast-iron interior. It is run as a cafe bar by a Christian charitable trust promoting responsible drinking, also as the location of a safe space late at night and for operating a street pastor service. It is true to its original purpose of providing a venue for up-and-coming musical acts.

In Northern Ireland, the Grand Opera House, Belfast, Frank Matcham 1895, was preserved and restored in the 1980s. The Gaiety Theatre, Isle of Man is another Matcham design from 1900 that remains in use after an extensive restoration programme in the 1970s. In Glasgow, the Britannia Music Hall (1857), by architects Thomas Gildard and H.M. McFarlane, remains standing, with much of the theatre intact but in a poor state, having closed in 1938. There is a preservation trust attempting to rescue the theatre.

One of the few fully functional music hall entertainments is at the Brick Lane Music Hall in a former church in North Woolwich. The Players' Theatre Club is another group performing a Victorian-style music hall show at a variety of venues, and The Music Hall Guild of Great Britain and America stage music hall-style entertainments.

== See also ==
- British comedy
- Early British popular music
- British theatre
- Concert saloon
- History of music in Paris
- Tivoli circuit
