= Don't Dilly Dally on the Way =

- Sheet music for "Don't Dilly Dally on the Way"

Song
- Published: 1919
- Composer: Charles Collins
- Lyricist: Fred W. Leigh

"Don't Dilly Dally on the Way", subtitled "The Cock Linnet Song" and often credited as "My Old Man (Said Follow the Van)", is a music hall song written in 1919 by Fred W. Leigh and Charles Collins, made popular by Marie Lloyd.

The song, although humorous, also reflects some of the hardships of working class life in London at the beginning of the 20th century. The suggestive, even racy lyrics elucidate one of the consequences awaiting irresponsible husbands and men. It joined a music hall tradition of dealing with life in a determinedly upbeat fashion. In the song a couple are obliged to move house, after dark, because they cannot pay their rent. At the time the song was written, most London houses were rented, so moving in a hurry – a moonlight flit – was common when the husband lost his job or there was insufficient money to pay the rent.

The couple rush to fill up the van, and its tailboard, with their possessions, in case the landlord appears. When the van is packed up, however, there is no room left for the wife. The husband therefore instructs her to follow the van, which she does, carrying the pet bird. Unfortunately, en route, the wife loses her way after stopping at a pub for a drink. Thereafter, she reflects that it would be ill-advised to approach one of the volunteer policemen (a "special"), as they are less trustworthy than a regular police constable (a "copper") and might take advantage of her inebriation. Alternatively (according to the physical gestures accompanying the song) they may simply be less qualified to give dependable street directions.

== Chorus ==
The chorus of the song is well known.

My old man said "Foller the van,
And don't dilly dally on the way".
Off went the van wiv me 'ome packed in it,
I walked behind wiv me old cock linnet.
But I dillied and dallied, dallied and I dillied
Lost me way and don't know where to roam.
Well you can't trust a special like the old time coppers.
When you can't find your way 'ome.

There are a number of alternatives to the last two lines:

Who'll put you up when you've lost your bedstead,
And you can't find your way 'ome?"

I stopped on the way to have me old half quarten,
now I can't find my way home.

Well you can't trust a man when your life's in a van
an' you can't find your way 'ome.

I had to stop to have a drop of tiddly in the pub
Now I can't find my way home.

Stopped off to have one at the old Red Tavern
And I can't find my way home.

== Performances ==
Various lineups of the Clancy Brothers (with Tommy Makem, Louis Killen, and Robbie O'Connell at different times) have performed the refrain as part of a medley, immediately following "They're Moving Father's Grave to Build a Sewer", which also deals with the travails of working class Londoners. These two songs appeared together on the group's 1965 album, Recorded Live in Ireland. Danny La Rue also often sang it in performances.

== Football chant ==
The song forms the basis of a football chant in the UK at clubs such as Aston Villa, Manchester United and Linfield FC. In the chant, the narrator's old man suggests being a fan of a rival club. The narrator rebukes their father using obscene language, often followed by mockery and threatened acts of extreme physical violence towards supporters of the rival club.

== In popular culture ==
- The song is sung by the character Blanche Simmons at the internees' Christmas concert in the TV series Tenko, shortly before they are marched out of the camp by Japanese soldiers at the end of the first series.
- In The Catherine Tate Show, during the "Life at Ma's" sketch (a spoof of Life on Mars), the last four lines are sung by Catherine Tate and a variety of other characters.
- The song also appeared in the Only Fools and Horses episode "Home Sick", being sung by Del Boy and Grandad.
- The first verse and the chorus were featured in Episode 211 of The Muppet Show, performed by Miss Piggy.
- It is sung in the 1943 black and white romantic comedy film The Gentle Sex.
- It is sung in the 1958 war film Ice Cold in Alex.
- It is sung in the 1958 movie Innocent Sinners by the main character 'Lovejoy'.
- In 1970, Cardinal Fang (Terry Gilliam) briefly began to recite the tune under his breath after citing charges of heresy against the Holy Church, but was subsequently cut off by Cardinal Ximénez (Michael Palin) before completing the first line. This was part of the famous Spanish Inquisition Sketch from the Monty Python comedy troupe. Palin, Jones, and Gilliam would burst into the room whenever someone uttered a form of the trigger phrase, "I didn't expect a Spanish Inquisition."
- It is sung in the opening of the 1974 TV play "Regan", written by Ian Kennedy Martin and starring John Thaw as the title character, which served as the pilot episode of The Sweeney.
- It opens Steven Berkoff's 1975 play East.
- In the 1985 EastEnders Sing-Along, it is sung by the cast with Gillian Taylforth singing the intro.
- The first verse and chorus is sung in Upstairs, Downstairs by the servants as part of their New Year's celebrations in Series 4, Episode 9, "Another Year." The group seems to mix up the line about the "special" and the old-time copper, but it may be because the butler, Mr. Hudson, serves as a "special." (See Series 4, Episode 3, "The Beastly Hun.")
- In an episode of The Archers broadcast on Monday 28 September 2015, the chorus is sung by Ruth Archer and her mother immediately before the latter's collapse from a stroke and subsequent death. An alternative third line is used - "Off went the van with me old man in it".
- In a commercial for American Express, Jerry Seinfeld is shown singing the song with others in an English pub, part of a montage showing the comedian's adjusting to British culture.
- It is sung by Mr. Bean in the 22nd episode of season 4 in animated series.
- Tessie O'Shea, Kay Kendall and the Pearly Kings and Queens, sang an excerpt of the song in the film London Town.
- In the comedy film Confessions from a Holiday Camp, the Lea family sing the song enroute to the holiday camp, drunkenly unaware that they've stumbled into a funeral car instead of a taxi.
- It is performed by Olly Alexander in the 2011 indie film The Dish & the Spoon.
