= Fred W. Leigh =

English lyricist (1871–1924)

- Born: William Frederick Bridgen; 1871; London, England
- Died: 21 August 1924 (aged 52/53) Edmonton, London, England
- Genres: Music hall
- Occupations: Songwriter, publisher
- Years active: 1890s-1920s

William Frederick Bridgen (1871 – 21 August 1924), known professionally as Fred W. Leigh, was an English lyricist who co-wrote several popular music hall songs of the early twentieth century.

== Biography ==
Born in London, he worked in the offices of the humorous magazine Punch when he was young, and later wrote stories for boys' magazines. In 1901, he joined the staff of music publishers Francis, Day & Hunter, as literary editor, and remained there until his death. He was described as a person with serious literary interests, and Marie Lloyd told him that he should have become a clergyman.

In 1905, when the young Jerome Kern visited London, Leigh collaborated with him on a song, "Won't You Kiss Me Once Before I Go?"; almost forty years later, Kern used Leigh's song "Poor John" in the Rita Hayworth film Cover Girl. Leigh went on to write the lyrics for some of the most popular music hall songs of the early twentieth century. These included "The Galloping Major" (1906), co-written with George Bastow, who performed it while cavorting about the stage on a wooden hobby horse; "Waiting at the Church" and "Poor John!" (1907), both very successful songs written with Henry Pether and performed by Vesta Victoria; "A Little of What You Fancy Does You Good" (1915), written with George Arthurs and performed by Marie Lloyd; "Why Am I Always the Bridesmaid?" (1917), written with Charles Collins for Lily Morris; and "Don't Dilly Dally on the Way" (1919), written with Collins for Marie Lloyd.

Leigh died in Edmonton, London, in 1924.
