= Henry E. Pether =

English songwriter (1867–1932)

Henry Edmond Pether (13 November 1867 – 7 February 1932) was an English songwriter and arranger.

He was born in Tottenham, London, and worked for many years as an employee of the music publishers, Francis, Day & Hunter, primarily as an arranger of songs, including traditional folk songs and shanties, for publication as sheet music. As a writer, his most successful songs included "Waiting at the Church" and "Poor John" (both with lyrics by Fred W. Leigh, sung by Vesta Victoria, 1906); and "The Seaside Posters Round the Home" (lyrics by Edgar Bateman, performed by Ernest Hastings, 1919). He also produced orchestral arrangements for revues, including The Ragtime Revue (1912), and The Co-Optimists (1921). Together with Bennett Scott, Worton David and others, Pether was one of the founders of the Performing Right Society, to ensure the fair distribution of copyright payments to songwriters.

He died in Palmers Green, London in 1932, aged 64.
