= Waiting at the Church =

Song by Vesta Victoria
- Released: 1906
- Genre: Music hall
- Composer: Henry E. Pether
- Lyricist: Fred W. Leigh

"Waiting at the Church" is a popular comedic British music hall song written by Fred W. Leigh (words) and Henry E. Pether (music) for Vesta Victoria, and copyrighted in 1906.

It is sung by a bride-to-be who has given her fiancé, Obadiah Binks, all her money to buy a ring or a house, only to be left "waiting at the church"; she finds out the truth when Obadiah sends her a note telling her he is already married. It has featured in a number of films since the earliest days of cinema. The silent film Waiting at the Church featured a performance by Victoria as she acted out the lyrics. Several other silent films were made to accompany recordings of the song. Sound films which use the song include Here Come the Huggetts, Millions Like Us and I Thank You. Richard Thompson included it on his album 1000 Years of Popular Music. It has also been covered many times, including by Julie Andrews and Miss Piggy, with Kermit the Frog.

The second half of the song's refrain was sung by the then Prime Minister James Callaghan at the Annual Congress of the TUC in September 1978, to end widespread speculation that there would be a general election that year. Callaghan misattributed the song to the better-known Marie Lloyd, an error not corrected by many news media when reporting it and which has in consequence become common.
