= Vesta Victoria =

English music hall singer and comedian (1873–1951)

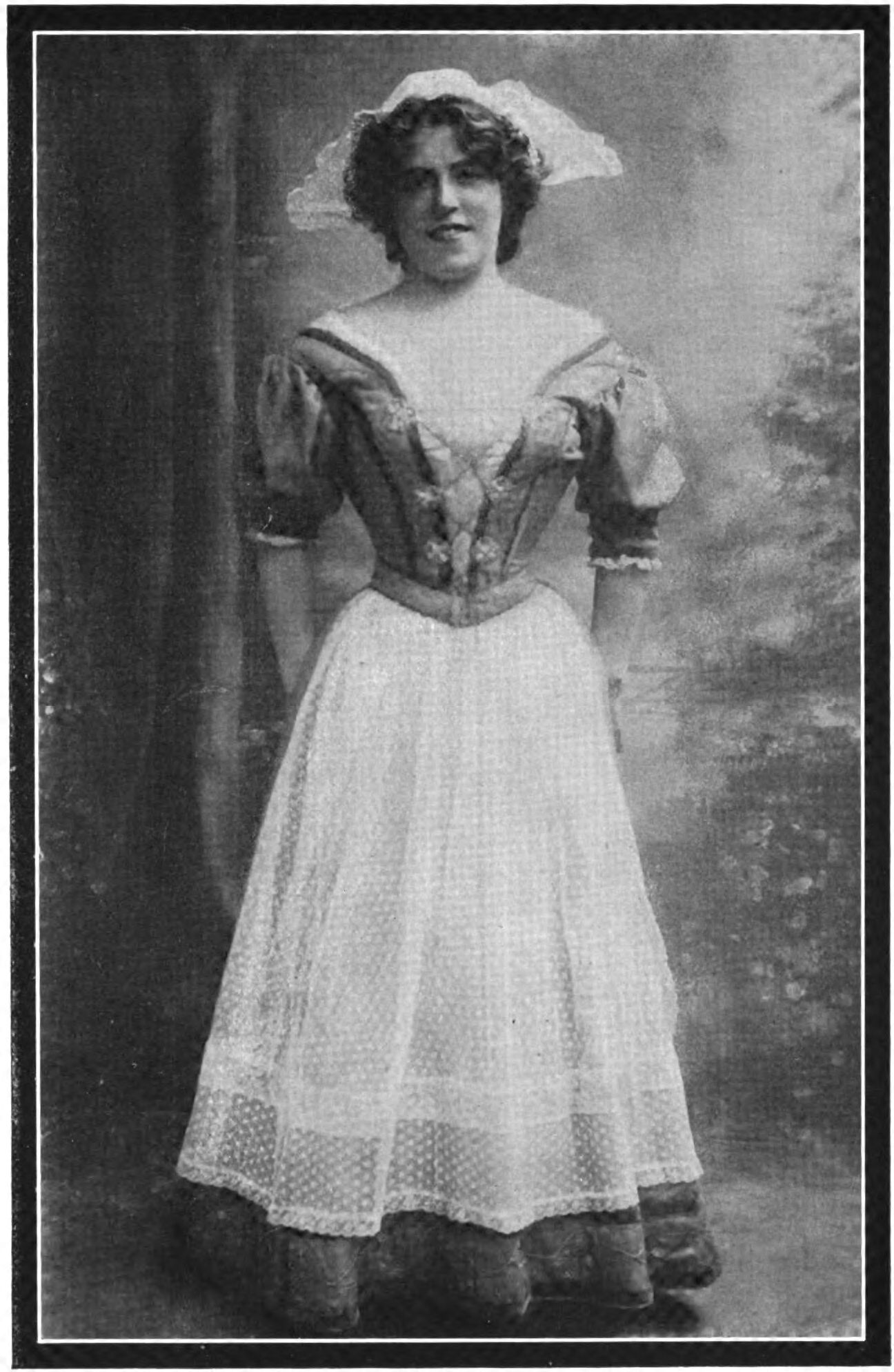
- Victoria, c. 1908
- Born: Victoria Lawrence; 26 November 1873; Leeds, Yorkshire
- Died: 7 April 1951 (aged 77); Hampstead, London
- Occupations: Music hall singer & comedian
- Years active: 1873–1938
- Known for: "Waiting at the Church"; "Daddy Wouldn't Buy Me a Bow Wow"

Vesta Victoria (born Victoria Lawrence, 26 November 1873 – 7 April 1951) was an English music hall singer and comedian. She was famous for her performances of songs such as "Waiting at the Church" and "Daddy Wouldn't Buy Me a Bow Wow", both of which were written specially for her. Vesta's comic laments delivered in deadpan style were even more popular in the USA. She was, at the beginning of the twentieth century, one of the most successful British entertainers in America.

== Life and career ==
Vesta Victoria was born Victoria Lawrence at 8 Ebenezer Place in Holbeck, Leeds, on 26 November 1873. Her parents, Joe and Emma (née Thompson), were themselves entertainers, and she made her stage debut aged six weeks in one of her father's sketches.

Billed as "Baby Victoria" until nearly ten years of age, she was "Little Victoria" by her first London appearance in 1883.

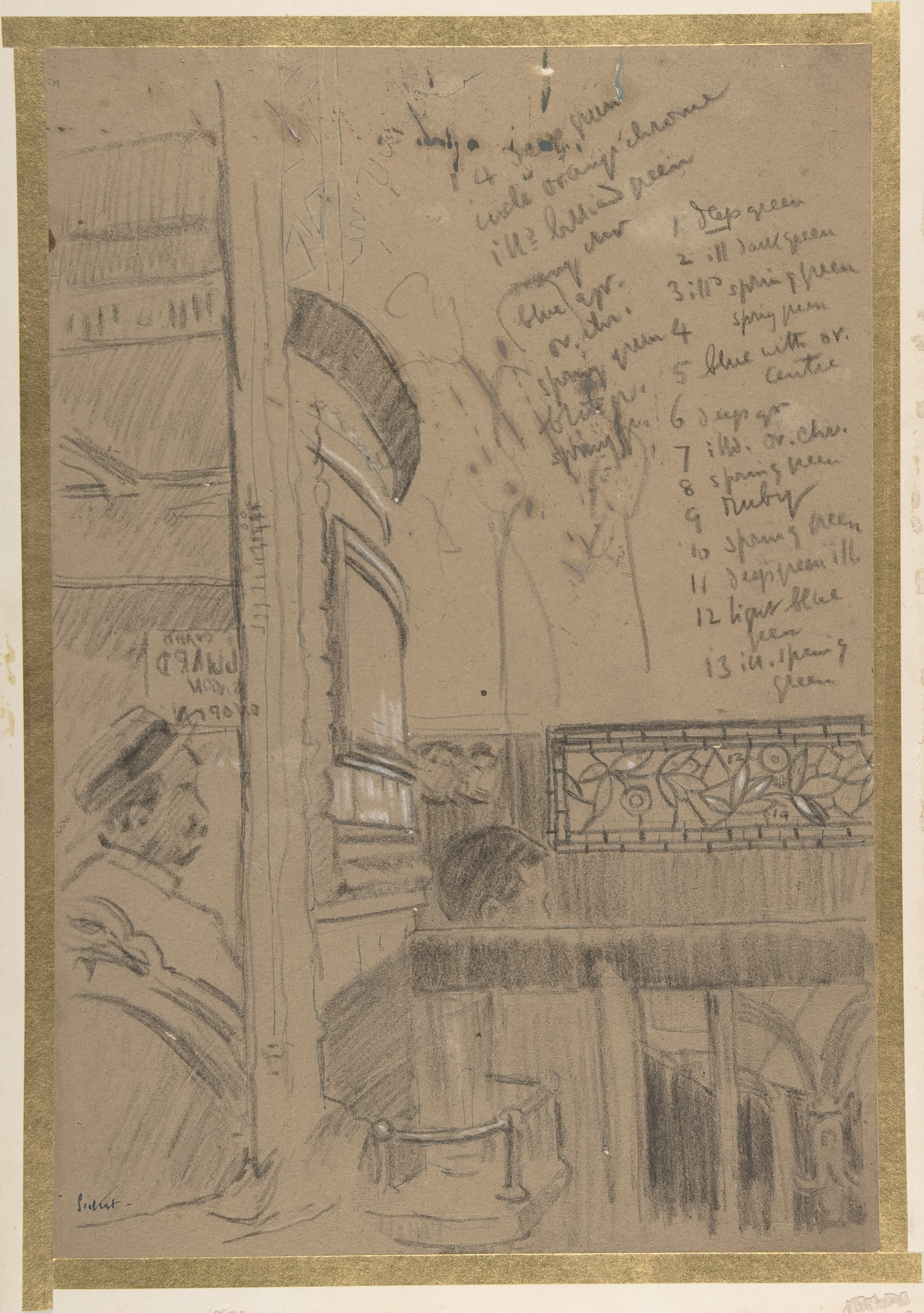
Walter Sickert's sketch for Vesta Victoria at the Old Bedford (The Met)

The painter Walter Sickert (1860–1942) made a portrait of her performing – Vesta Victoria at the Old Bedford – in about 1890.

Silent footage from 1907 of Vesta performing "Poor John"

Though Yorkshire-born, Vesta assumed a Cockney stage persona. Her singing career escalated in 1892 when "Daddy Wouldn't Buy Me a Bow Wow" became a huge hit. She sang it first at South London Palace, a music hall in Lambeth, and to high success on her first trip to the United States in 1892, when she appeared for eight weeks at Tony Pastor's theatre in New York City.

Vesta married twice, both marriages producing a daughter. She was married to music hall manager Frederick Wallace McAvoy from 1894 to 1904. They had a daughter, Irene. The marriage ended in divorce, because McAvoy was said to be a cruel, abusive and adulterous husband. In 1912, Vesta announced in New York that she was married to William Terry. In 1913, the couple had a daughter, Iris. However, the 1912 "marriage" may have been invented, as English records show that Vesta and William Terry were married in Wandsworth in 1920. In any event, the marriage ended in 1926, when Vesta filed for divorce on the grounds of "Ill-usage and association with other women".

One of the most highly paid vaudeville stars, Vesta bought a considerable amount of property in America. By the 1920s, she is estimated to have been worth around £3.25 million – the equivalent in 2014 of around £975 million. She retired after World War I, but re-recorded many of her hits in 1931 in a series of Old-Time Medleys, and performed at the Royal Variety Show of 1932. She also appeared in a number of films in the 1930s, including The Dance of Death (1938). Unlike younger music hall contemporaries Charlie Chaplin and Stan Laurel, Victoria remained principally a live performer in England instead of becoming a full-time film performer in the USA. Unfortunately, apart from a short film synchronized to gramophone of "Waiting at the Church," very little remains of what film work she did.

Vesta died of breast cancer in Hampstead, north London, on 7 April 1951. She did not leave a will, and at probate her estate was valued at £15,631.17s. 5d. The large fortune she amassed by the 1920s is thought to have been lost in the interim partly to the scheming of handsome young men, and partly as a result of the news-making robbery of her famous jewelry collection.

She was cremated at Golders Green Crematorium in London, where a lilac tree (no longer in existence) was planted in her memory.

== Legacy ==
Dr Carol Morley argues that Vesta's characterizations of downtrodden women laughing off problems were, in their time, an influence on the development of the emerging musical form of the blues.

By 1906, Vesta's fame in America was then such that one of San Francisco's main roads was renamed Vesta Victoria Avenue in her honour; the city was grateful that she performed numerous benefit concerts for the relief of sufferers in the 1906 San Francisco earthquake.

Actress Helen Fraser toured her one-woman show Vesta, based on Vesta Victoria's life and work, in the 1990s, playing over 90 performances in the UK and across America.
