= Splinter (disambiguation) =

A splinter is a sharp fragment of material, usually wood, metal, or fibreglass.

Splinter may also refer to:

== People ==
- Splinter Johnson (1920–2002), American basketball player
- Tracy Splinter (born 1971), German-South African writer who has been missing since 2016

== Literature ==
- Splinter (novel), a 2007 science fiction novel by British writer Adam Roberts
- Splinters: Another Kind of Love Story, a 2024 memoir by Leslie Jamison

== Entertainment ==
- Splinters (revue), a British revue first staged in the First World War

=== Film and television ===
==== Film ====
- Splinter (2006 film) by director Michael D. Olmos
- Splinter (2008 film), a horror film
- Splinters (1929 film), a UK musical comedy film based on the 1915 revue
  - Splinters in the Navy (1931), a sequel to the 1929 film
  - Splinters in the Air (1937), a sequel to the 1929 film
- Splinters (2018 film), a Canadian drama film
- Splinters (2020 film), an Argentine documentary film

==== Television ====
- "Splinter" (12 Monkeys), a 2015 episode
- "Splinter" (Smallville), a 2005 episode
- "Splinter" (The Walking Dead), a 2021 episode
- “Splinter” (SpongeBob SquarePants), a 2008 episode

=== Music ===
- Splinter (band), an English 2-men band
- Splinter (Sneaker Pimps album) (1999)
- Splinter (The Offspring album) (2003)
- "Splinter", a song by Sevendust from album Cold Day Memory (2010)
- Splinter (Songs from a Broken Mind), an album by Gary Numan (2013)
- "Splinter", a song by Man Overboard from Heavy Love (2015)

=== Fictional characters ===
- Splinter (Teenage Mutant Ninja Turtles), a character from the Teenage Mutant Ninja Turtles series
- Splinter, an insect-like creature in the Nintendo game Metroid Prime 2: Echoes
- Splinter, Woody Woodpecker's niece

== Other ==
- Splinter group, a smaller division, cell, or faction that has split off from a larger organization or movement
- Splinter, in contract bridge, a splinter bid meaning a suit with one card or no cards
- Splinter News, a news and opinion website
- One of the word or morpheme fragments making up a blend word
- Splinter (political party), a Dutch political party
- Splinter pattern camouflage

== See also ==
- Giovanni di ser Giovanni Guidi (1406–1486), Italian painter known as Lo Scheggia ("the Splinter")
- Splint (disambiguation)
