= Ernest C. Rolls =

British theatre producer

- Born: Josef Adolf Darewski; 6 June 1890; Vienna, Austria
- Died: 20 January 1964 (aged 73); London, England
- Other names: Ernest Charles Rolls
- Occupation: Theatre producer

Ernest Charles Rolls (born Josef Adolf Darewski; 6 June 1890 – 20 January 1964) was a British theatre producer, of Russian Jewish heritage, who lived and worked in Britain and Australia.

== Early life and career ==
He was born in 1890, probably in Vienna, Austria (according to most sources and the 1901 UK census), or possibly in Warsaw, Poland, and was one of five children of a Russian Jewish opera singer, Eduard Darewski, born in Minsk. The family moved to Manchester, England, in 1894, and then to London in 1899. Among his brothers were composer and conductor Herman Darewski, and songwriter Max Darewski.

By 1910, he had started working as a theatrical producer, and adopted the name Ernest C. Rolls. He managed the actress Eva Moore, but was sued by her for non-payment of earnings. He produced a controversial "re-telling" of the story of the Garden of Eden, The Dawn of Love, at the London Palladium in 1911, and several revues. These included Ragmania (1912) and Full Inside (1914), which featured several Australian chorus girls and where he met singer and comedienne Jennie Benson (1884–1979); they married in 1920. He also produced Venus Ltd. (1915), Hanky-Panky (1917), Any Old Thing (1917), and the cross-dressing revue Splinters in 1919. Many of his productions were characterised by the copious use of glamorous female chorus and ballet performers, and lavish sets, in the style of Charles B. Cochran. Rolls frequently collaborated with his brothers Herman and Max Darewski on the musical numbers.

In 1921, after losing money on his productions of Laughing Eyes (featuring Ninette de Valois) and Oh Julie, he was declared bankrupt. The following year, he was found guilty of indecent exposure to two women outside the window of his home, and was sentenced to three months imprisonment, later reduced on appeal. Though his career in London faltered as a result, he put on a pantomime, Aladdin, and his wife Jennie was then invited to perform on J. C. Williamson's new Tivoli vaudeville circuit in Australia.

== In Australia ==
Rolls moved to Australia with his wife in 1924, initially as her manager, but soon became active in theatrical productions. He produced Aladdin in Melbourne, with Jennie Benson in the title role, and regularly visited New York to secure the rights to new revues and musicals. In 1928, he mounted the first Australian production of Jerome Kern's Sunny, and followed with a production of Rio Rita. He "produced some of the most lavish Ziegfeld-type revues Australia has ever seen. His recipe for success was songs, dances, comedy and girls - lots of beautiful girls - the more scantily clad the better."

Over the following decade, he worked with all the main theatre companies and managers in Australia, both in Melbourne and Sydney. He joined forces with entrepreneur George Marlow, but as a result of the growth of talking pictures and the Great Depression, the Marlow-Rolls company went into voluntary liquidation. In 1930 Rolls formed his own production company, staging a series of revues at St James Theatre in Sydney, and the following year took over the lease of the Palace Theatre, Melbourne. He introduced nudity in some of his revues, such as Tout Paris in 1933, but with little success until introducing comedies such as Flame of Desire, which he attempted but failed to turn into a film. He then moved to New Zealand, and leased a chain of theatres.

In 1938 he joined the board of J. C. Williamson's, and was appointed chief producer of the new Australian and New Zealand Theatres Ltd (ANZT). Although the new scheme was not a financial success, Rolls is credited with presenting its most creative and successful shows, including The Women by Clare Boothe Luce, with an all-female cast; and the glamorous revue Folies d’Amour. Financial pressures on Rolls himself, and on the company, led him to return to Britain in 1939.

== Later life and death ==
Back in Britain, his ventures had little success, his presentation of Clare Boothe Luce's A Margin of Error closing after 45 performances. During the Second World War, he produced revues in regional centres around the country, with his wife as the leading lady, and he also attempted to revive the careers of some music hall performers as their business manager, producing shows in Paddington. Between 1956 and 1963, he managed a "Dancing Waters" show, in various British seaside resorts.

He died in London in 1964 at the age of 73. His wife Jennie died in 1979, at the age of 95.
