= Adoree =

Adoree may refer to:

- Angel Adoree, in the British documentary series Escape to the Chateau and Escape to the Chateau DIY
- Renée Adorée, stage name of French actress Jeanne de la Fonte (1898–1933)
- Adoree' Jackson (born 1995), American National Football League player
- Adorée Villany, stage name of a French dancer and choreographer (1891–?)
