= Splinters (revue) =

Theatrical revue

Theatrical poster for Splinters of 1923

Splinters was a popular theatrical revue that ran in several versions in Britain between the First World War and the 1930s. It featured female impersonators, and men cross-dressing as women, and was originally developed in the First Army by a concert party, Les Rouges et Noirs. A film version was made in 1929, with sequels.

== History ==
During the First World War, the British First Army fought in France and Belgium. Its commander, Sir Henry Horne (later Lord Horne), proposed setting up a concert party from among the troops, for entertainment. Formed in 1915, the troupe was named for the regimental colours of the army, a black stripe between two red stripes. Although the troops were all men, it was decided to include a chorus of soldiers cross-dressing as women. According to one report, "the genuinely feminine appearance of the 'Beauty Chorus' meant that it did not come across as a drag show, but as a heterosexual concert party with an intriguing element." The show itself was entitled Splinters, to suggest the variety of sketches and musical performances in the revue.

At the end of the war, the troupe were in Valenciennes, where they continued to perform in the municipal theatre for several months. They were demobilised together in order that they could continue to perform, and returned to England. They re-formed as the Splinters troupe, under the onstage management of Captain Eliot Makeham, and in December 1918 made their first London appearance at the YMCA's Beaver Hut Theatre in the Strand. The stars of the show were original members Hal Jones (1890–1976) as 'Splinter', who played most of the leading male roles, and Reg Stone (1897–1934) as 'Phil', the lead female impersonator. Stone was later described in Film Weekly magazine as "the most amusing female impersonator in England", and by the Daily Express as "surely the best female impersonator that either stage or screen has ever known".

The show was an immediate success, and led to appearances at the Savoy Theatre in 1919, a performance for King George V at Windsor Castle, and a nationwide tour that continued until 1924. Shows were initially presented by Ernest C. Rolls, and from about 1921 by Lew Lake. One of the straplines used in publicity was "Every artiste a soldier and every soldier an artiste". In one review, it was said that the impersonations were "exceedingly realistic and dangerously alluring". Printed programmes "highlighted the main elements of their appeal: their commendable wartime service, their evocation of patriotic motifs, and their skilful female impersonation. The troupe’s theatricals mostly involved typical revue fare such as song and dance numbers, and sketches featuring comedic patter. Some of the turns referred to life on the front, but this theme was not strictly adhered to...".

Much of the original troupe disbanded in 1924, but with revised personnel the show continued to tour, and in 1929 was made into a film, Splinters. This featured Hal Jones, Reg Stone, and Lew Lake, but starred established film comedians Nelson Keys and Sydney Howard. The film was the first talkie to be made at Elstree Studios, and was followed by Splinters in the Navy (1931) and Splinters in the Air (1937).

The revue had a residency at Felixstowe in the early 1930s. A new 1933 revue, Splinters 1914-1933, contained some of the original cast, but also genuine female performers, allowing "much comic business throughout." The drag artists Ford and Sheen were members of the troupe before establishing their own double act in the mid-1930s. By the late 1930s and the start of the Second World War, when the show finally disbanded, Splinters was a recognised and popular brand, with an "ubiquitously cherished status in popular culture" in Britain.

In assessing the cultural significance of the Splinters shows, academic Jacob Broomfield concludes:

Les Rouges’ status as ex-servicemen meant that observers were much more likely to perceive the troupe’s shows as an informative and entertaining way to connect with life at the front than as a disconcerting display. However, as important as the troupe’s wartime service was to their appeal, the primary determinant behind Les Rouges’ success was the high quality of the performances, particularly the artists’ ability to project attractive renderings of femininity. Some dissenters, such as the Lord Chamberlain and a few members of the press, expressed vague discomfort with female impersonation, but this controversy did not seriously impede the ensemble’s career.
