= Helena Pickard =

British actress (1900–1959)

- Autographed photo
- Born: 13 October 1900; Handsworth, Sheffield, West Riding of Yorkshire, England
- Died: 27 September 1959 (aged 58); Oxfordshire, England
- Resting place: Golders Green Crematorium
- Other name: Helena Marie Pickard
- Occupation: Actress
- Years active: 1924–1959 (film)
- Spouses: Cedric Hardwicke (m. 1927; div. 1950) Herbert Rothbarth (m. 1956)
- Children: Edward Hardwicke
- Relatives: Percy Charles Pickard (brother)

Helena Pickard (13 October 1900 – 27 September 1959) was a British stage, film and television actress.

== Career ==
Pickard was a prominent character actress in West End plays such as When We Are Married and Flare Path and also appeared on Broadway. She made her screen debut in the 1924 silent film The Clicking of Cuthbert. She played the female lead in the 1931 comedy Splinters in the Navy but mostly appeared in supporting roles.

While working in the United States she appeared in two Hollywood productions before returning to Britain. During her later career she appeared occasionally on television in series including The Four Just Men, Dr Jekyll and Mr Hyde and Vanity Fair, and in the BBC radio series Saturday Night Theatre.

== Personal life ==
Pickard was the sister of Group Captain Percy Charles Pickard, RAF, who died during the Second World War while leading the air raid on Amiens Prison in Operation Jericho on 18 February 1944.

She was married to the celebrated actor Cedric Hardwicke, with whom she had a son, Edward Hardwicke, who also became an actor. Later, after divorcing Hardwicke, she married the financier Herbert Rothbarth. She died in 1959 from an overdose of sleeping pills, with her remains handled at Golders Green Crematorium.

== Filmography ==
Year	Title	Role	Notes
1924	The Clicking of Cuthbert	Adeline	Short
1930	Lord Richard in the Pantry		Uncredited
1931	Splinters in the Navy	Lottie	
1934	Music Hall	Lou	
1934	Nell Gwyn	Mrs. Pepys	
1937	Limelight	Pixie	
1940	Let George Do It!	Oscar's Wife	
1940	Saloon Bar	Mrs. Dorothy Small	
1943	Forever and a Day	Trimble Maid	
1944	The Lodger	Annie Rowley / Katie in Opening Sequence	
1947	The Turners of Prospect Road	Lil Turner	
1949	Miss Pilgrim's Progress	Mrs. Jenkins	
1951	The Lady with a Lamp	Queen Victoria	
1954	The Love Lottery	Sally's Mother	
1955	Make Me an Offer	Lady On Train	
1956	Doublecross	Mrs. Ernest	

== Bibliography ==
- Rubinstein, William D. The Palgrave Dictionary of Anglo-Jewish History. Palgrave Macmillan, 2011. ISBN 978-0-230-30466-6.
