= Lew Lake =

English comic actor, writer, producer and theatre manager (1875–1939)

- Born: Louis Charles Polack; 10 January 1875; Shoreditch, London, England
- Died: 5 November 1939 (aged 64); Islington, London, England
- Occupations: Comic performer, writer, producer, theatre manager
- Years active: 1900–1939

Lew Lake (born Louis Charles Polack; 10 January 1875 – 5 November 1939) was an English comic actor, writer, producer, and theatre manager.

== Life and career ==
He was born in Shoreditch, London, the son of a Dutch-born cigar maker. Around 1900, he started performing in music halls as a comedian, and soon formed a double act with Bob Morris (1866–1945). They performed a two-act comedy sketch called "The Bloomsbury Burglars", written by Lake, in which Lake (as "Nobbler") and Morris (as "Jerry") played window cleaners who broke into a house to recover some incriminating letters, but were chased over rooftops and eventually caught by the police. The performance introduced the phrase "Stick it, Jerry!", which became a popular catchphrase. It was adopted by soldiers in the First World War, and the term "Jerry" then came to be used as a nickname for German soldiers.

The sketch was filmed in 1912, by A. E. Coleby, as The Bloomsbury Burglars, and on stage Lake and Morris also performed a sequel, "My Pal Jerry". The sketches required a number of extras, and Lake then set up his own company, Lew Lake’s Colossal Comedy Company of Comedians, for which he wrote another sketch, "The Rib-Nosed Baboon", which required 150 extras.

Lake was elected as "King Rat" of the Grand Order of Water Rats, the show business charity, in 1917 and 1918. He became a successful writer and theatrical producer of revues, including the cross-dressing revue Splinters. As a producer, he worked closely with the husband-and-wife team of Arthur Lucan and Kitty McShane in the 1920s, devising several shows featuring the couple as "Old Mother Riley and Daughter". Lake also appeared, performing as "Nobbler", in the 1929 film Splinters, and its sequels, Splinters in the Navy (1931) and Splinters in the Air (1937). In later life, he managed Collins's Music Hall in Islington, then known as Islington Hippodrome, and lived above the premises.

Lew Lake died in Islington in 1939, aged 64. He was buried at Abney Park Cemetery in Stoke Newington, where his grave was restored by the Music Hall Guild in 2015.

His son, Lewis Polack, known as Lew Lake Jr. (1901–1958), continued in the family tradition as a performer and manager of the Islington theatre until his death.
