= Splint =

Splint or splints may refer to:

- Splint (laboratory equipment), a small wooden tinderstick used in laboratories
- Splint (medicine), a device immobilizing part of the body
- Splint (programming tool), for analyzing software
- Splint basketry
- Splints, a horse ailment
- Shin splints, a condition that mainly affects athletes
- Mandibular advancement splint, a medical device worn in the mouth used to treat sleep-related breathing disorders

== See also ==
- Splinter (disambiguation)
