= Nudity in live performance =

Nudity in dance, theater, and other performances

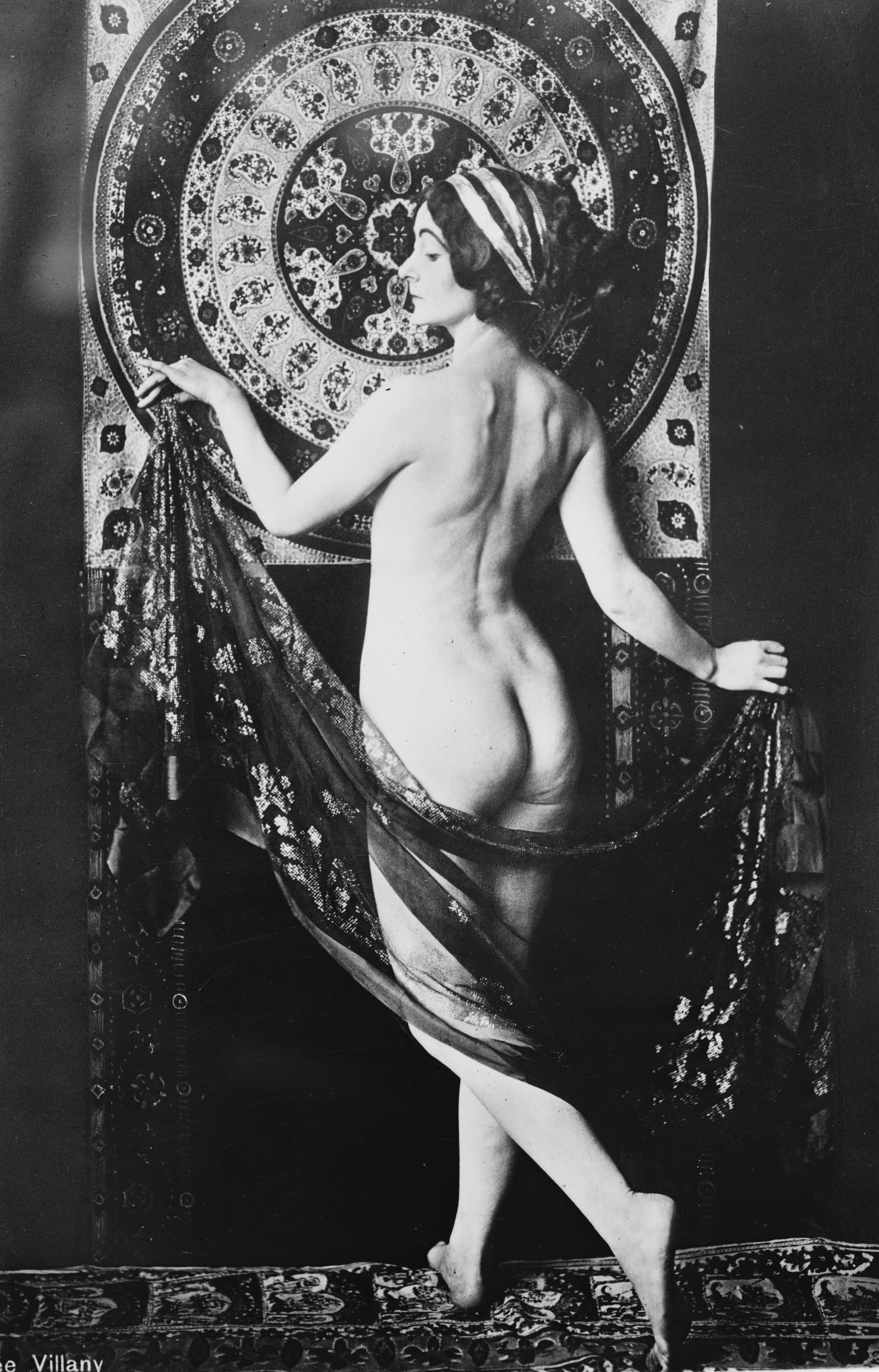
Adorée Villany danced naked on stage in the years before World War I.

Nudity in live performance, such as dance, theatre, and performance art, include the unclothed body either for realism or symbolic meaning. Nudity on stage has become generally accepted in Western cultures beginning in the 20th century.

Nudity is employed to convey symbolic expressions as well as a means to allow more freedom of movement and in some cases to accentuate the characteristics of the body. In contrast to the traditional norm of separating nudity from sexuality nudity has evolved to being used in the 21st century to convey sexual meaning and expression or to arouse.

== Dance ==
Dance, as a sequence of human movement, may be ceremonial, social or one of the performing arts. Partial or complete nudity is a feature of ceremonial dances in some tropical countries. However, some claim that modern practices may be used to promote "ethnic tourism" rather than to revive authentic traditions.

In Western traditions, dance costumes have evolved towards providing more freedom of movement and revealing more of the body; complete nakedness being the culmination of this process.

In the 1910s in Europe a number of solo female dancers performed in the nude. One was Adorée Villany.

Nudity became part of classical ballet in 1972 in the performance of Flemming Flindt's Triumph of Death by the Royal Danish Ballet. While premiering in Denmark without comment regarding the nudity, the work's performance in the United States in 1976 was limited to four evening performances at the Metropolitan Opera House in New York City.

Some contemporary choreographers consider nudity as one of the possible "costumes" available for dance, some seeing nudity as expressing deeper human qualities through dance which works against the sexual objectification of the body in commercial culture. Proponents of such nudity hold that there is a distinction between sexual and non-sexual or sensual nudity and that full nudity is used as an emotional expression and, often the only, means to fully accentuate body characteristics as a performer moves.

While nudity in social dance is not common, events such as "Naked Tango" have been held in Germany.

In a 2012 article, dance critic Alastair Macaulay surveyed nudity on stage from its beginnings in the 1960s and finds it had been normalized in avant-garde modern dance, including erotic elements. Nudity is less often found in mainstream dance performances.

== Performance art ==
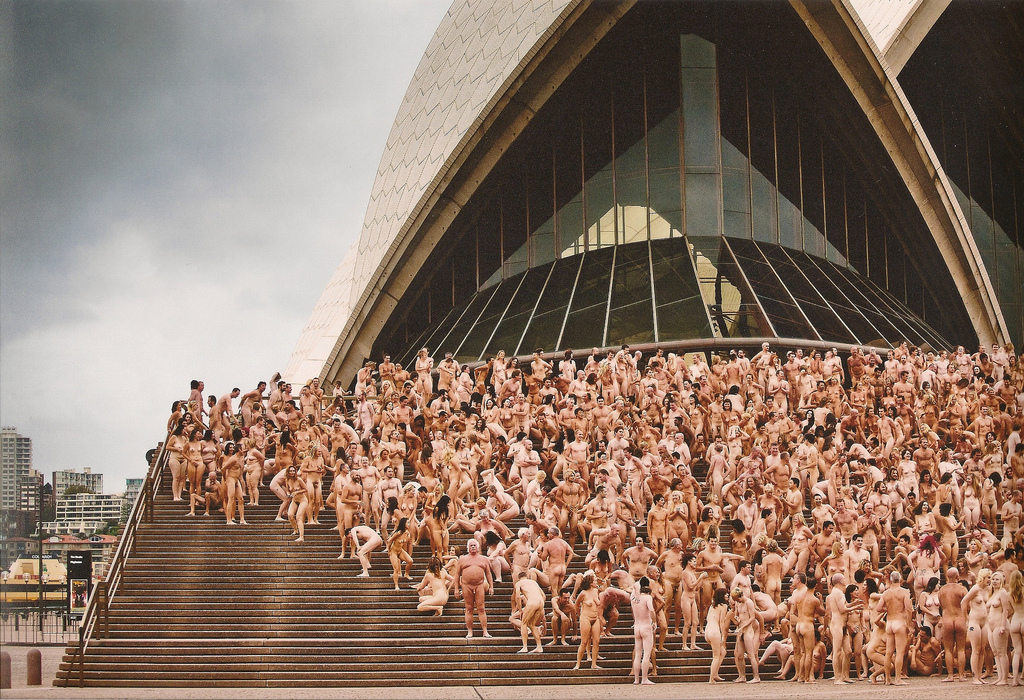
Participants preparing to be photographed by Spencer Tunick at the Sydney Opera House

Photography of groups of nude people in public places has been done around the world with or without official cooperation. The gathering itself is proposed as performance art, while the resulting images become statements based upon the identities of the people posing and the location selected: urban, scenic landscapes, or sites of historical significance. The photographers including Spencer Tunick and Henning von Berg state a variety of artistic, cultural, and political reasons for their work, while those being photographed may be professional models or unpaid volunteers attracted to the project for personal reasons.

== Theater ==
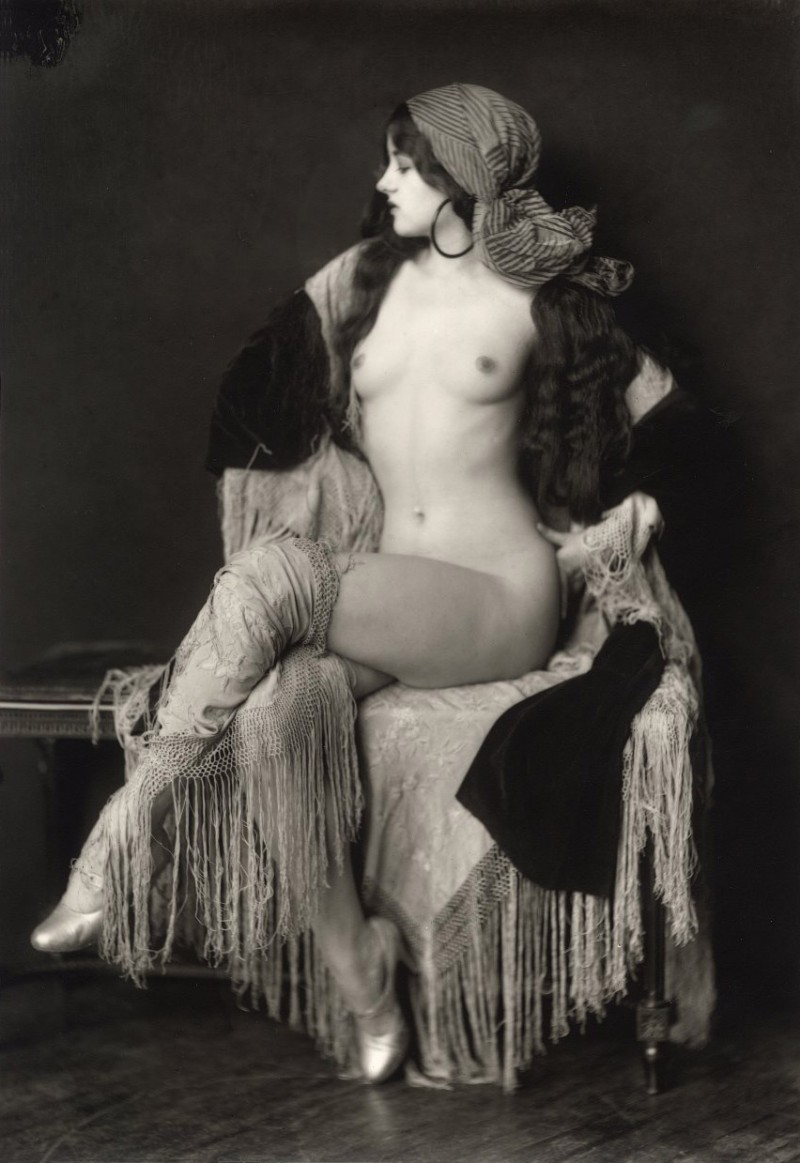
Virginia Biddle, Ziegfeld performer, 1927

Models posing on stage nude or partially draped was a feature of tableaux vivants at London's Windmill Theatre and New York's Ziegfeld Follies in the early 20th century. English and United States law did not allow nude or topless performers to move on stage, but allowed them to stand motionless to imitate works of art.

Reflecting the era, the American theater in the 1960s addressed issues including hypocrisy and freedom. By 1968 nudity was freely employed by playwrights, directors and producers not only on subjects of sexuality but regarding social injustice and war. One of the first was the Broadway musical Hair in 1968, which was tame compared with Dionysus in 69, a modern version of The Bacchae that included a chorus of nude and partially nude actors who staged a birth ritual and interacted with the audience.

In 1987, in an opposite style of the Ziegfeld Follies and in the environment of the 1980s public fear of the AIDS virus, the human form was presented as one in quarantine and unable to be in contact with others in the play Beirut. In the original production at the Robert W. Wilson MMC Theater, Marisa Tomei portrayed the girlfriend of the main character, Torch, who was living in forced isolation, and was the person who had bypassed the quarantines of a world of the near future to visit him.

Less common is the use of nudity in sexual plays with the sexual scenes mostly of a simulated nature. In recent years however such plays have also employed real sex or sexual acts being performed onstage.

The issue of nudity in performance came into the spotlight again in a 2007 revival of the play Equus in which the lead characters of Alan and Jill were nude roles. The play attracted attention as Alan was played by Daniel Radcliffe of Harry Potter fame, who was 17 years old at the time.

Eventually nudity became an issue of personal integrity and privacy, with some actors choosing to perform nude, others not. However, in spite of precautions to control cell phone use, videos of nude scenes on Broadway have been taken by audience members and posted online. Such videos take a brief nude scene out of context in violation of the performer's expectations, which may make them reluctant to do so in the future.

== Erotic performances ==
Public performances that have the intent of arousing the erotic interest of an audience have an indeterminate history, generally associated with prostitution. Striptease did not end with performers entirely nude until the late twentieth century. Modern striptease and go-go dancing often have performers continuing to dance naked after stripping. Live sex shows have been marginalized after a brief period of acceptance, perhaps due to competition from interactive on-line performances, or because the enactment of pornographic scenarios on stage is "too real" for general public enjoyment.

== See also ==
- Nude (art)
- Depictions of nudity
