= Disappearance of Tracy Splinter =

2016 missing person case in Switzerland

Tracy Splinter
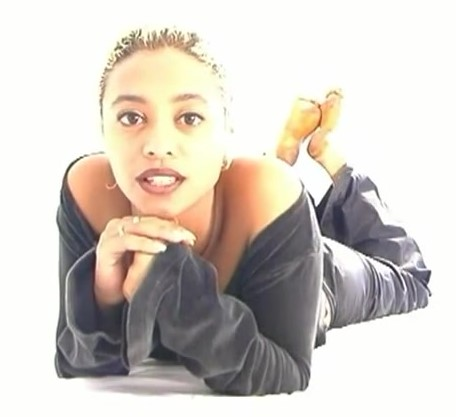
- Born: Tracy Fredericka Splinter; 28 October 1971; Cape Town, South Africa
- Disappeared: August 2016 (aged 44); Graubünden, Eastern Switzerland
- Status: Missing for 10 years and 1 or 2 months
- Occupations: Writer, author
- Known for: winning a poetry competition championship

Tracy Splinter (born 28 October 1971 in Cape Town, South Africa) is a German-South African writer and spoken-word author who mysteriously disappeared in August 2016 in Switzerland. Splinter had acquired German citizenship in 1997. Her works were in English, German and Afrikaans.

== Biography ==
In 1999, Tracy Splinter stood for Hamburg in the German-speaking slam poetry championship in Weimar, Germany. Splinter made it to the finals and won the competition which took place in two nights.

Splinter provided technical language guidance toward the publication of the book "Transatlantic Modernism" in 2009, a literary criticism of "Modernism in Europe and modernism in the United States".

== Disappearance and search ==
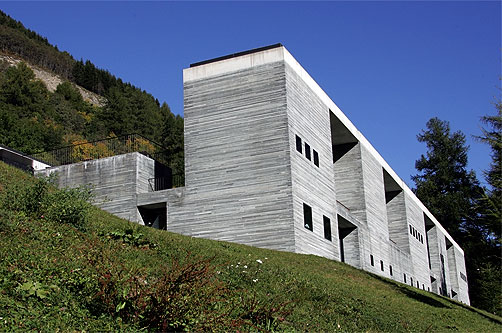
Main building of the Thermal Baths

Having recently stayed at the Alpina and Schnider hotels in Vals, Graubünden in Eastern Switzerland, Splinter went missing in August 2016. Her luggage containing her personal belongings including "suitcase with clothes, a backpack, a laptop, a camera, mountain sticks and several personal documents" was found at a Postauto stop in the immediate vicinity of the 7132 Thermal Baths hotel where she had attempted to check in but where her credit card had been declined for lack of funds and cash payment had not been accepted. After a year with no news of her whereabouts her parents hired a private investigator to find her. As of October 2026, her whereabouts are still not known.

== See also ==
- List of people who disappeared mysteriously: post-1970

== Links ==
- Tracy Splinter: Verschollen in der Schweiz. In: Sat.1 Gold, 6. Dezember 2021 (45 Min.) (German Television).
- Natalia Widla, Simon Muster: Sie stürmte aus dem Luxushotel in Vals – und wurde nie mehr gesehen. In: Das Magazin, 23. Oktober 2026 (German).
