= Splinters (2020 film) =

Argentine documentary film (2020)

Splinters (Spanish: Esquirlas) is a 2020 Argentine documentary film written and directed by Natalia Garayalde. The film investigates a catastrophic explosion at the Río Tercero military munitions factory in 1995, seen through the lens of 12‑year‑old Garayalde’s home‑video footage. Two decades later, she revisits her archives, blending personal recordings with national and amateur archives to reveal evidence that the blast was a deliberate state‑orchestrated attack linked to illicit arms trafficking.
