= Splinters (1929 film) =

1929 film

- Directed by: Jack Raymond
- Written by: W. P. Lipscomb
- Produced by: Herbert Wilcox
- Starring: Sydney Howard; Nelson Keys; Carroll Gibbons
- Cinematography: David Kesson
- Production companies: The Gramophone Company; British & Dominions Film Corporation
- Distributed by: Woolf & Freedman Film Service
- Release date: 23 December 1929
- Running time: 82 minutes
- Country: United Kingdom
- Languages: Sound (All-Talking); English
- Budget: $175,000
- Box office: $500,000

Splinters is an all-talking sound, 1929 British musical comedy film based on the stage revue Splinters. It was British & Dominions Film Corporation's first all-talking release filmed entirely in the UK. The revue tells the story of the origin of the concert party Splinters created by UK soldiers in France in 1915. The film was followed by two sequels, Splinters in the Navy (1931) and Splinters in the Air (1937).

== Cast ==
- Nelson Keys
- Sydney Howard as Doleful Soldier
- Lew Lake as Nobbler
- Hal Jones as Sergeant
- Reg Stone as Drag Artist
- Wilfred Temple
- Carroll Gibbons as Himself, leading the HMV Orchestra
- Gus Aubrey as Drag Act
- George Baker
- Walter Glynne
- Sidney Grantham
- Clifford Heatherley as Sergeant Miller

== Songs ==
- "I'll be Getting Along"- by James Dyrenforth and Caroll Gibbons
- "Encore"- by James Dyrenforth and Caroll Gibbons
- "There's Room in My Heart"-by James Dyrenforth and Caroll Gibbons

== See also ==
- List of early sound feature films (1926–1929)
