= Splinters in the Air =

1937 film

- Directed by: Alfred J. Goulding
- Written by: K. R. G. Brown
- Screenplay by: Bert Lee; Jack Marks; Ralph Reader; R.P. Weston
- Story by: K. R. G. Brown
- Produced by: Herbert Wilcox
- Starring: Sydney Howard; Richard Hearne; Stuart Robertson; Ellen Pollock; Binkie Stuart
- Cinematography: Eric Cross
- Edited by: Jill Irving; Derek Monks
- Production company: Herbert Wilcox Productions
- Distributed by: General Film Distributors
- Release date: 1937
- Running time: 71 minutes
- Country: United Kingdom
- Language: English

Splinters in the Air ((also known as Splinters In The Air Force) is a 1937 British comedy film directed by Alfred J. Goulding and starring Sydney Howard and Richard Hearne. It was written by K.R.G. Brown, and is a loose sequel to the films Splinters (1929) and Splinters in the Navy (1931). It was made at Pinewood Studios.

== Premise ==
An inventor is mistaken for his twin brother, and is forced to take his brother's place in the Royal Air Force.

== Cast ==
- Sydney Howard as George Metcalfe / Sydney Metcalfe
- Richard Hearne as Sgt. Hearne
- Stuart Robertson as Sgt. Robertson
- Ralph Reader as Sgt. Reader
- Ellen Pollock as Charles' wife
- D. A. Clarke-Smith as Warrant Officer
- Franklyn Bellamy as Charles, the C.O.
- Ronald Ward as Richards
- Binkie Stuart as Mary Dunwoody
- Lew Lake as Lew, the Stage Manager
- Geraldine Hislop as maid

== Reception ==
The Monthly Film Bulletin wrote: "The transparent story relies mainly on Sydney Howard's mannerisms. His baffling inanity is fairly amusing, whilst Ellen Pollock's French wife is entertaining and true to type. The direction is uninspired and the support is poor."

Kine Weekly wrote: "A comedy extravaganza with an RAF background. this film provides the sketchiest of frames for the urbane humour of Sydney Howard. He scores twice, first as an all-in wrestler and later as an inexperienced pilot of a helicopter. 'Splinters,' the famous war-time concert party, registers once, but otherwise the entertainment is nebulous."
