= Splinters in the Navy =

1931 film

- Trade advertisement
- Directed by: Walter Forde
- Written by: Jack Marks; Harry Fowler Mear; Bert Lee; Robert Patrick Weston
- Produced by: Julius Hagen
- Starring: Sydney Howard; Alf Goddard; Helena Pickard; Paddy Browne
- Cinematography: Sydney Blythe
- Edited by: Jack Harris
- Music by: W.L. Trytel
- Production company: Twickenham Studios
- Distributed by: Woolf & Freedman Film Service
- Release date: November 1931
- Running time: 76 minutes
- Country: United Kingdom
- Language: English

Splinters in the Navy is a 1931 British comedy film directed by Walter Forde and starring Sydney Howard, Alf Goddard, and Helena Pickard. It was written by Jack Marks, Harry Fowler Mear, Bert Lee and Robert Patrick Weston. It was made at Twickenham Studios, and is a sequel to Splinters (1929), about an army concert party. A further sequel, Splinters in the Air, was released in 1937.

== Premise ==
To celebrate their Admiral's impending marriage, his men stage a variety performance. Meanwhile, Joe Crabbs attempts to win back his girlfriend from the Navy's boxing champion.

== Cast ==
- Sydney Howard as Joe Crabbs
- Alf Goddard as Spike Higgins
- Helena Pickard as Lottie
- Frederick Bentley as Bill Miffins
- Paddy Browne as Mabel
- Rupert Lister as Admiral
- Harold Heath as Master-at-Arms
- Ian Wilson as call boy
- Lew Lake as himself
- Hal Jones as himself
- Reg Stone as himself
- Wilfred Temple as himself
- Laurie Lawrence as Petty Officer
- Thomas Thurban as bandmaster

== Reception ==
Film Weekly wrote: "There is much broad fun in Splinters in the Navy although it is patchy in construction, and falls down in some of the concert-party scenes."

Kine Weekly wrote: "A nautical hotchpotch, a popular collation of broad comedy, music and songs, which is rather lacking in cohesion and action, but, nevertheless, scores the laughs, and should appeal to the masses. Although Walter Forde has dovetailed the Splinters Concert Party fairly successfully into the main theme, the humour gained at the expense of female impersonation is not only rather old-fashioned, but it may be a little displeasing to some. It is the original comedy methods of Sydney Howard and the excellent presentation that get the picture over."
