= Adorée Villany =

French dancer and choreographer

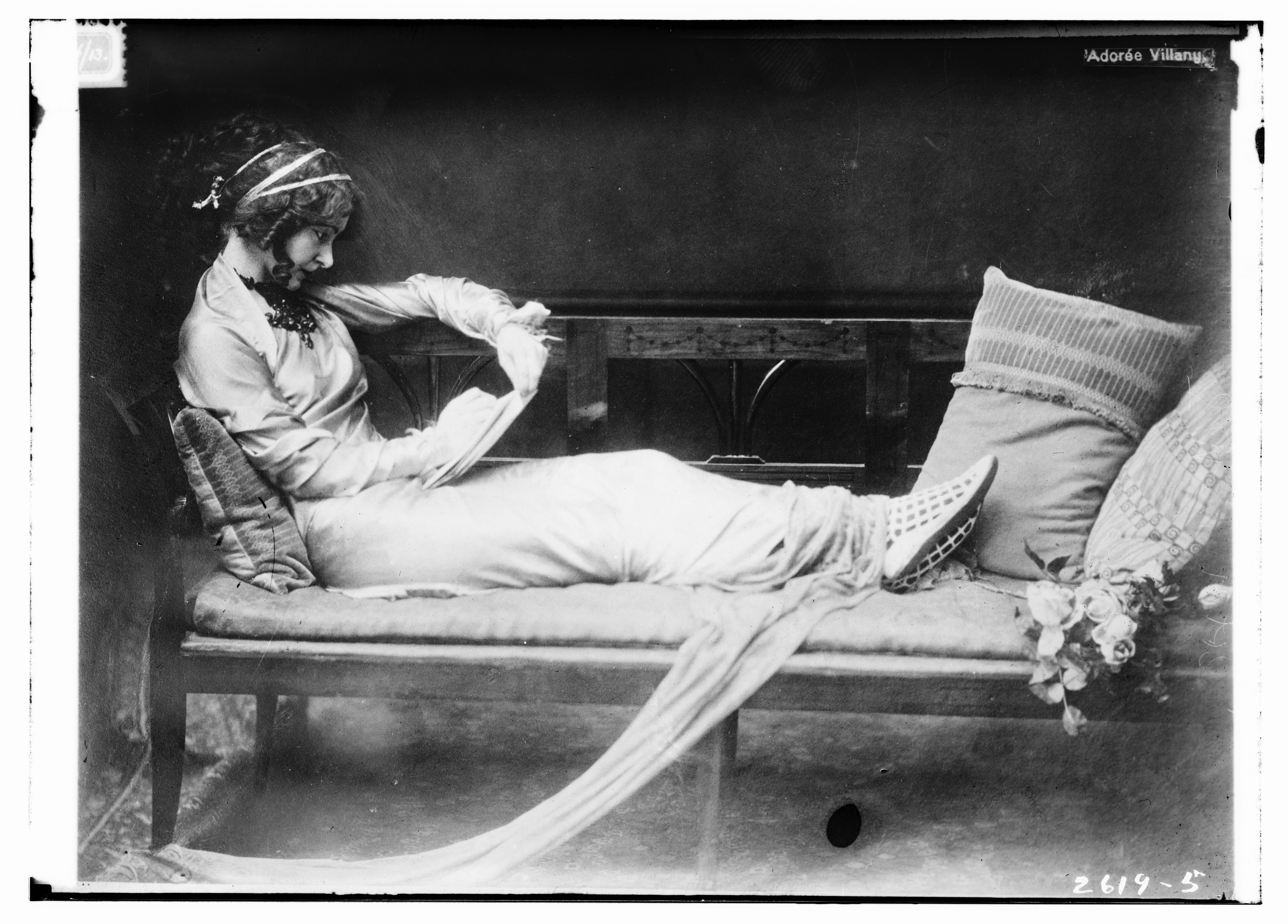
- Adorée Villany,1910
- Born: Unknown; Unknown
- Died: Unknown

Adorée Via (Viola) Villany was the stage name for a dancer and choreographer.

== Biography ==
Ambiguity surrounds Villany's birthplace and name. She was reported at various times to be French (born in Rouen), Hungarian (“The Pearl of the Puszta”), or a German Jew (born in Danzig as Erna Reich). She appears to have spent most of her career in Germany, and last appears in the German press in 1927. The Grazer Volksblatt newspaper in 1911 states she began performing in the Berlin Überbrettl cabaret (perhaps in 1902) as “[an Isadora] Duncan imitator.”

Other sources state she came public notice in 1905, performing the Dance of the Seven Veils while simultaneously speaking the final monologue from Oscar Wilde's play Salome. Her works explored mythical, historical and Oriental themes, as well as sometimes possessing abstract qualities. Villany also incorporated themes from paintings by contemporary artists such as Franz Stuck and Arnold Böcklin. She designed her own costumes, which were often very revealing, and uncovered her body during her performances. Villany performed in Prague, Paris, Ghent, Berlin, Rotterdam, Vienna and Brussels and at spas such as Marienbad and San Sebastián.

She was prosecuted for appearing unclothed on stage in Munich in 1911 but was acquitted; the jury found that her performance was in the "higher interests of art". In 1913, she was fined 200 francs by the Tribunal correctionnel in Paris for indecent exposure. However, shortly before World War I, she was one of several dancers who had been considered notable dancers and had solo performances in the nude. Others included Nina (Engelhardt) Hard and Olga Desmond.

== Bibliography and filmography ==
Villany published a book on dance, Tanz-Reform und Pseudo-Moral Kritischsatyrische Gedanken aus meinem Bühnen- u. Privatleben (Dance Reform and Pseudo-Morality Critical Satyrical Thoughts from My Stage and Private Life), (1912) that expressed her aesthetic principles.

She appeared in the 1906 German film Tanz der Salome by Otto Messter and the 1915 Danish film Slør-Danserinden by Rino Lupo.
