= 1902 in British music =

This is a summary of 1902 in music in the United Kingdom.

== Events ==
- 1 March – Baron Frederic Allred d’Erlanger‘s Piano Quintet is performed in London at St James’s Hall, Piccadilly by the Kruse Quartet with d’Erlanger himself as pianist.
- 10 March – The Bucolic Suite for orchestra by Ralph Vaughan Williams is performed for the first time in Bournemouth.
- 2 April – The light operetta Merrie England by Edward German is first produced at the Savoy Theatre in London.
- 4 April – The Piano Trio in D minor by Frank Bridge is performed in public for the first time at the Steinway Hall in London.
- 14 May – The tenor Enrico Caruso makes his highly successful debut at Covent Garden as the Duke in Verdi’s Rigoletto. Also singing is the Australian soprano Nellie Melba as Gilda. Caruso releases his first recordings in Britain during May.
- 2 June – Land of Hope and Glory, with music by Edward Elgar and lyrics by A. C. Benson, is publicly performed in London for the first time, by Clara Butt.
- 26 June – Composer Hubert Parry is made a baronet in the 1902 Coronation Honours, while another British composer, Charles Villiers Stanford, is knighted.
- 9 August – Frederick Bridge is director of music at the Coronation of King Edward VII and Queen Alexandra. Music performed during the ceremony includes works by Thomas Tallis, Orlando Gibbons, Henry Purcell, Arthur Sullivan, Charles Villiers Stanford and John Stainer.
- date unknown – In his book, The Operatic Problem, MP William Johnson Galloway expresses concern at the lack of home-grown musical talent: "Things have come to such a pass that one may well wonder whether there is any room for an Englishman, and whether the time has not arrived for a voice to be raised on behalf of native artists and native art."

== Popular music ==
- "I Live in Trafalgar Square", words & music by C. W. Murphy, performed by Morny Cash
- "Land of Hope and Glory", lyrics by A. C. Benson to music by Sir Edward Elgar
- "Speak, my Heart!", poem by A. C. Benson set to music by Sir Edward Elgar

== Classical music: new works ==
- Edward Elgar – Dream Children, Op. 43
- Sir Henry Walford Davies – Three Jovial Huntsmen
- Ralph Vaughan Williams – "Whither Must I Wander"

== Opera ==
- Edward German – Merrie England, with libretto by Basil Hood

== Musical theatre ==
- 18 January – A Country Girl, by James T. Tanner, with lyrics by Adrian Ross, additional lyrics by Percy Greenbank, music by Lionel Monckton and additional songs by Paul Rubens, opens at Daly's Theatre, and runs for 729 performances.
- 10 May – Three Little Maids, by Paul Rubens, with additional songs by Percy Greenbank and Howard Talbot, opens at the Apollo Theatre (later moving to the Prince of Wales Theatre, and runs for 348 performances.
- 15 November – The Girl from Kays, with book by Owen Hall, music by Ivan Caryll, and lyrics by Hall, opens at the Apollo Theatre (later moving to the Comedy Theatre, and runs for 432 performances.

== Births ==
- January – Billy Pigg, Northumbrian piper (d. 1968)
- 11 January – Evelyn Dove, first black singer to be played on BBC Radio (d. 1987)
- 21 January – Webster Booth, tenor (d. 1984)
- 29 March – William Walton, composer (d. 1983)
- 30 March – Ted Heath, bandleader (died 1969)
- 1 May – Sonnie Hale, actor and singer (d. 1959)
- 31 May – Billy Mayerl, pianist, composer and conductor (d. 1959)
- 20 July – Jimmy Kennedy, songwriter (d. 1984)
- 9 August – Solomon Cutner, pianist, known professionally as Solomon (d. 1988)
- 28 October – Elsa Lanchester, dancer, singer and actress (d. 1986)
- 15 December – Mary Skeaping, choreographer (d. 1984)

== Deaths ==
- 11 January – James James, harpist and composer of the Welsh national anthem, "Hen Wlad fy Nhadau", 69
- 28 March – Walter Laburnum, music hall singer, 54
- 21 April – Ethna Carbery, songwriter, 37 (gastritis)
- 21 August – Bessie Bonehill, music hall entertainer, 47 (stomach cancer)
- date unknown – Jones Hewson, D'Oyly Carte soloist, 27

== See also ==
- 1902 in the United Kingdom
