= 1000 Years of Popular Music =

Live album by Richard Thompson
- Released: July 2003
- Recorded: July 2002
- Venues: Joe's Pub, New York City
- Genre: Rock
- Length: 76:06
- Label: Beeswing
- Producer: Simon Tassano

Richard Thompson chronology
More Guitar (2003)	1000 Years of Popular Music (2003)	Ducknapped! (2003)

Professional ratings
Review scores
Source	Rating
AllMusic	4/5 stars
Greenman Review	Recommend
Pitchfork	7.1/10
Uncut	4/5 stars
Encyclopedia of Popular Music	3/5 stars

1000 Years of Popular Music is a 2003 live album by Richard Thompson.

The album was originally conceived after Richard Thompson, along with many other artists, was asked by Playboy magazine to nominate his choice of the best songs of the millennium in anticipation of the year 2000. The magazine intended the use of the term "millennium" to be hyperbole that emphasized the end of the 2nd millennium or songs within the collective memory of their readership at that time, probably expecting nothing earlier than the British Invasion at best. In an act of malicious compliance, Thompson followed these instructions exactly as they were worded, and produced a list which did span 1000 years of music, including the oldest-known English-language songs, a medieval Italian dance tune, and various other folk songs, alongside slightly more contemporary fare. The list was never published by Playboy; it was subsequently released into CD format. The songs comprising the track list cover a roughly thousand-year period, 1068–2001, starting with "Sumer Is Icumen In". The most recent song included on the album is Britney Spears' hit "Oops!... I Did It Again".

The songs, arranged for play on a single guitar, are played by Thompson, vocalist Judith Owen, and percussionist Michael Jerome, when needed.

A DVD with the same name was released in 2006. This was recorded in 2005 during a different tour, has a slightly different track listing and features Debra Dobkin replacing Michael Jerome on percussion and vocals.

== Track listing of original CD version ==
1. "Sumer Is Icumen In" (traditional, arranged by Thompson)
2. "King Henry V's Conquest of France" (traditional, arranged by Thompson)
3. "When I Am Laid In Earth" (Henry Purcell, arranged by Thompson)
4. "So Ben Mi Chi Ha Bon Tempo" (Orazio Vecchi, arranged by Thompson)
5. "Shenandoah" (traditional, arranged by Thompson)
6. "Blackleg Miner" (traditional, arranged by Thompson)
7. "Waiting at the Church" (Henry E. Pether and Fred W. Leigh, arranged by Thompson)
8. "Trafalgar Square" (C.W. Murphy, arranged by Thompson)
9. "There Is Beauty in the Bellow" (from The Mikado by Gilbert and Sullivan, arranged by Thompson)
10. "Why Have My Loved Ones Gone?" (Stephen Foster, arranged by Thompson)
11. "Old Rocking Chair's Got Me" (Hoagy Carmichael)
12. "Orange-Coloured Sky" (Milton DeLugg, William Stein)
13. "Cry Me a River" (Arthur Hamilton)
14. "Drinking Wine Spo-dee-o-dee" (Stick McGhee, J. Mayo Williams)
15. "The Fool" (Lee Hazlewood)
16. "A Legal Matter" (Pete Townshend)
17. "Tempted" (Glenn Tilbrook, Chris Difford)
18. "Kiss" (Prince)
19. "Oops!... I Did It Again" (Max Martin, Rami Yacoub)
20. "Sam Hall" (unknown, arranged by Thompson)
21. "Money, Money, Money" (Benny Andersson, Björn Ulvaeus)
22. "It Won't Be Long" (John Lennon, Paul McCartney)
23. "Marry, Ageyn Hic Hev Donne Yt" (traditional, arranged by Thompson) – introduced as a "medieval tune from Brittany", but actually a medieval-style version of Britney Spears' "Oops!... I Did It Again"

=== Track listing of 2CD/DVD version ===
(Recorded at Bimbo's club, San Francisco, 2005)

1. "Sumer Is Icumen In" (trad., arr. by Thompson)
2. "King Henry" (trad., arr. by Thompson)
3. "So Ben Mi Ca Bon Tempo" (Orazio Vecchi, arr. by Thompson)
4. "Bonnie St. Johnstone" (trad., arr. by Thompson)
5. "O Sleep Fond Fancy" (Thomas Morley)
6. "Remember O Thou Man" (Thomas Ravenscroft)
7. "Shenandoah" (trad., arr. by Thompson)
8. "Blackleg Miner" (trad., arr. by Thompson)
9. "I Live in Trafalgar Square" (C.W. Murphy)
10. "There Is Beauty in the Bellow of the Blast" (from The Mikado) (W.S. Gilbert, Arthur Sullivan, arr. by Thompson)
11. "Java Jive" (Ben Oakland/Milton Drake)
12. "Night and Day" (Cole Porter)
13. "Orange-Coloured Sky" (Milton DeLugg, William Stein)
14. "Drinking Wine Spo-Dee-O-Dee" (Granville "Stick" McGhee, J. Mayo Williams)
15. "A-11" (Hank Cochran)
16. "See My Friends" (Ray Davies)
17. "Friday on My Mind" (George Young, Harry Vanda)
18. "Tempted" (Chris Difford, Glenn Tilbrook)
19. "Oops!... I Did It Again" (Max Martin, Rami Yacoub)
20. "Cry Me A River" (Arthur Hamilton)
21. "1985" (Mitch Allan, John Allen)
22. "Sam Hall" (trad., arr. by Thompson)

== Personnel ==
- Richard Thompson – guitar and vocals
- Michael Jerome – percussion
- Judith Owen – vocals
- Debra Dobkin – percussion and vocals (DVD version)

== See also ==
- The 500 Greatest Songs of All Time (by Rolling Stone magazine)
- The Rock and Roll Hall of Fame's 500 Songs that Shaped Rock and Roll
- List of best-selling singles
