= Anybody Here Seen Kelly? =

1928 film

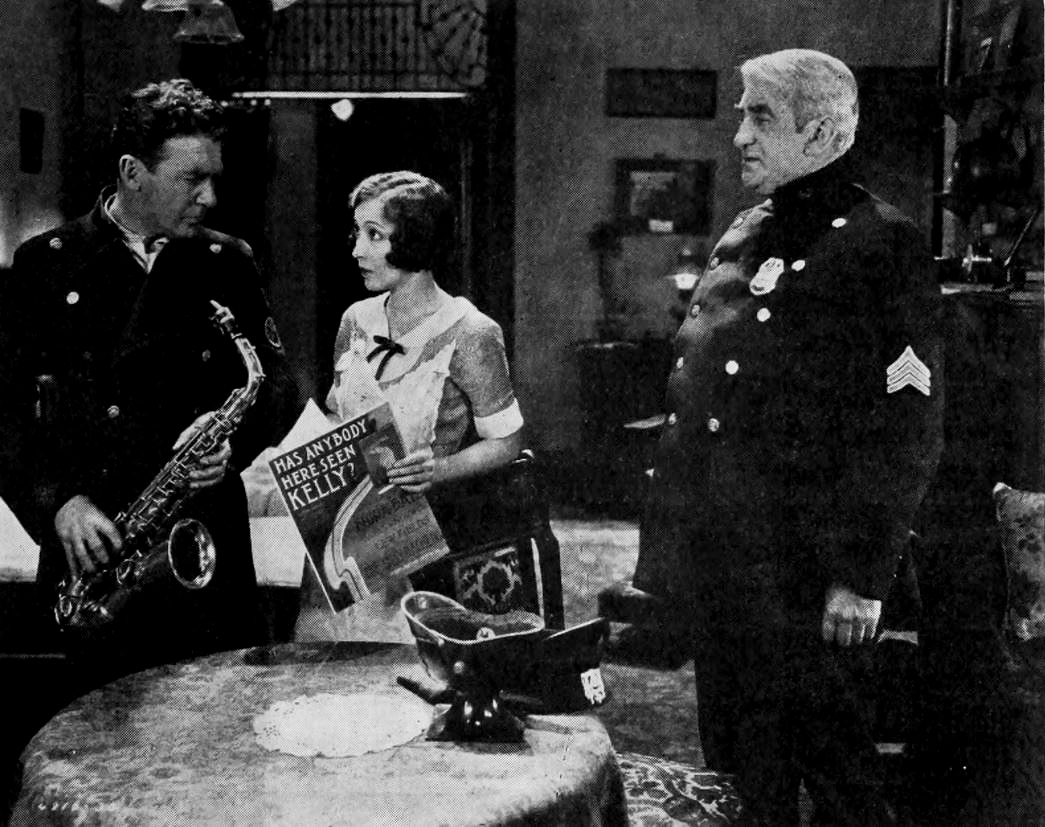
- Film still with Love holding sheet music
- Directed by: William Wyler
- Written by: Leigh Jason (story); Walter Anthony (titles); Albert DeMond (titles); John B. Clymer; Rob Wagner
- Produced by: Richard Wyler
- Starring: Bessie Love; Tom Moore; Kate Price; Addie McPhail; Bruce Gordon; Alfred Allen
- Cinematography: Charles J. Stumar
- Distributed by: Universal Pictures
- Release date: September 9, 1928 (U.S.)
- Running time: 1 hour 20 minutes
- Country: United States
- Language: Silent (English intertitles)
- Budget: $60,000

Anybody Here Seen Kelly? is a 1928 American silent comedy film directed by William Wyler. This was the first non-Western film to be directed by Wyler. Produced by Universal Pictures, this is Bessie Love's final silent film.

== Plot ==
While serving in the American Army during World War I, Pat Kelly, a womanizing soldier, tells all the young women he romances to come and visit him in New York City after the war. Never expecting any of them to take him up on it, he gives his address as the Metropolitan Museum of Art. However, Mitzi Lavelle, one determined young French woman, comes to America looking for him. Walking through the streets of New York, she eventually finds him working as a traffic police officer.

== Cast ==
- Bessie Love as Mitzi Lavelle
- Tom Moore as Pat Kelly
- Kate Price as Mrs. O'Grady
- Addie McPhail as Mrs. Hickson
- Bruce Gordon as Mr. Hickson
- Alfred Allen as Sgt. Malloy
- Tom O'Brien as Buck Johnson
- Wilson Benge as Butler
- Rosa Gore as French Mother
- Dorothea Wolbert as Slavey

== Production ==
Location scenes were filmed in New York City.

The title of the film originates from the 1908 British music hall standard "Has Anybody Here Seen Kelly?" by C. W. Murphy and Will Letters. The song was popularized in the United States by singer Nora Bayes who sang it in the first ever Ziegfeld Follies.

== Preservation ==
With no prints of Anybody Here Seen Kelly? in any film archives, it is a lost film.

== See also ==
- List of lost films
