= King Henry Fifth's Conquest of France =

Traditional British ballad

King Henry Fifth's Conquest of France (Child 164; Roud 251) is a British ballad which recounts a highly fictionalized version of the Battle of Agincourt and the events surrounding it.

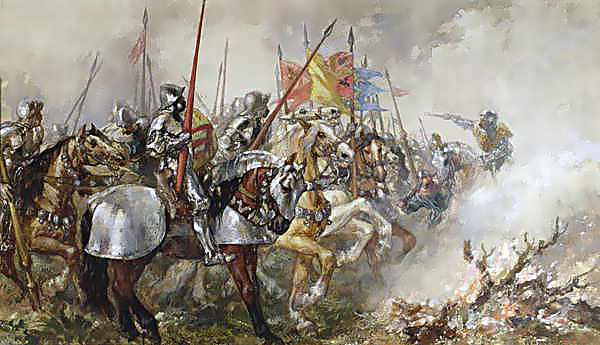
The Battle of Agincourt

== Synopsis ==
In the ballad, King Henry sends his page to France to collect a tribute in gold that has not been paid for some while. Instead, the king of France sends back three tennis balls, so that the young king can "learn to play." (The gift of tennis balls also appears in Shakespeare's Henry V and in film adaptations of it, including The King; the play and other versions of the story refer to a tun of tennis balls.) Henry raises an army and invades France, and the king of France agrees to pay the tribute and give Henry "the finest flower that is in all France" for his wife.

== Historical inaccuracies ==
Francis James Child and John Jacob Niles point out some of the ballad's historical inaccuracies: France did not pay tribute to England, the English did not march to Paris after the battle, and the estimate of 10,000 Frenchmen killed is high. Henry's conscription, which in the ballad called on Cheshire, Lancashire and Derby and spared married men and widow's sons, did not do so in real life. The tennis balls are also disputed; some chroniclers mention them, but other historians conclude that they are probably a legend, possibly borrowed from a story of Darius and Alexander.

== Recording ==
The song appears on Richard Thompson's 1000 Years of Popular Music.
