= William Brock (pastor) =

English pastor, abolitionist and biographer

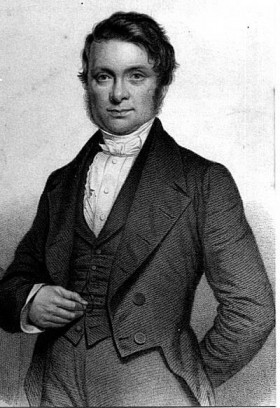
- Rev. William Brock
- Born: 1807
- Died: 13 November 1875 (aged 67–68)
- Resting place: Abney Park Cemetery in Stoke Newington, London.
- Occupations: watchmaker and pastor
- Known for: Slavery abolitionist, Bible society

William Brock (1807–1875), was the first minister of Bloomsbury Chapel in Central London (1848–72), an abolitionist, biographer and supporter of missionary causes.

== Early years ==
Brock was the eldest of three children born to Ann and William Brock. His father died and his family survived due to charity. His schooling included Honiton grammar school.

He began work as an apprentice watchmaker in Sidmouth. After seven years he was a journeyman and he was a watchmaker in Hereford for two years. In due course, Brock gave up his watch-making. He was christened and he attended Baptist College, Stepney, from where he graduated in 1833. He was offered employment at St Mary's Church in Norwich. Here he controversially stayed for fifteen years. He supported meetings of the non-denominational Missionary Society, which gradually evolved into the non-denominational but largely nonconformist London Missionary Society.

His links with both Anglicans and Nonconformists may have helped him, in 1848, to be appointed minister of the first purpose-built central London Baptist Chapel - the Bloomsbury Chapel - whose establishment had hinged partly on overcoming objections from the Anglican establishment.

== Ministerial life ==
At his Bloomsbury Chapel, which served Central London north of the River Thames, Brock's hearty, low-key, oratorial style was in marked contrast to that being developed at the Baptist chapel on the South Bank by the "crowd-pulling" evangelist, the Rev. Spurgeon. At an ordination service for a missionary, to which both had been invited, Spurgeon noted how extraordinarily different they were: he found Brock's delivery to be "massive, ornate, rich in words, too ponderous for our tongue, and in terms which would have suited none but himself", but, he generously added "it was ’homely, hearty, intense, overwhelming; it did our soul good".

Brock is just on the right of centre in the crowd of this painting which is of the 1840 Anti-Slavery Convention.

The welcoming, homely style of Brock also showed itself in his inclusive approach to different denominations after leaving Bloomsbury Chapel. Still in good health, but having given up his financially comfortable position as pastor of a major Central London church on reaching the age of 65, he chose to supply churches and chapels of all denominations, part-time. He became, to use his own words, "churchless, wifeless, homeless" in one week, and adapted to retirement from Bloomsbury Chapel by renting rooms in Hampstead (close to where his eldest son lived) for the summers, whilst, during winters, he "hibernated" as he called it, on the south coast, at St. Leonards, where the air was fresher and the climate milder.

== Career as a biographer ==
Amongst his wider interests, Brock was an active member of the Peace Society pioneered by such figures as Henry Richard. Brock was, therefore, opposed to warfare at the time of the Crimean War and Siege of Lucknow but nevertheless wrote a biography of General Sir Henry Havelock, who was a fellow baptist. Published in 1858, Brock's departure into contemporary biography ran to several editions. However, he was widely criticised by those who would not buy his book, including friends in the Baptist ministry and Peace Society, for attempting the portrayal of a Christian who was also a soldier in complex contemporary political and military events. Less controversial was his biography of John Bunyan; it too became a best-seller, bound into many of Cassell's late Victorian editions of Bunyan's works.

== Abolitionist ==
Besides his interests in the work of the Peace Society, albeit somewhat compromised by his controversial biographical writing, Brock was also active as an abolitionist. His name occurs frequently in accounts of meetings held in England during the 1840s, 1850s and early 1860s to support the abolition of slavery in the United States, and pressing for abolition in Josiah's Conder's nonconformist newspaper. At an early stage in this work, he appears as a delegate in the painting of the world's first international Anti-slavery Convention in 1840, which hangs in the National Portrait Gallery in London.

== Death and memorial ==
Brock died at St. Leonard's on 13 November 1875 and was buried at Abney Park Cemetery in Stoke Newington, London.
