= Crataegus heterophylla =

- Lindley's illustration from The Botanical Register (1828)

Scientific classification
- Kingdom: Plantae
- Clade: Tracheophytes
- Clade: Angiosperms
- Clade: Eudicots
- Clade: Rosids
- Order: Rosales
- Family: Rosaceae
- Genus: Crataegus
- Section: Crataegus sect. Crataegus
- Series: Crataegus ser. Crataegus
- Species: C. heterophylla

Binomial name
- Crataegus heterophylla Flüggé

Species of hawthorn

Crataegus heterophylla, known as the various-leaved hawthorn, is of uncertain origin. Its original native range is not known, possibly it was the Caucasus of Western Asia. Suggestions that it originated in Southeast Europe may be based on misidentification.

== Description ==
Crataegus heterophylla is a small tree of about 3 m (9.8 ft) in height, sometimes up to 10 m (33 ft); often semi-evergreen in character, with unusually variable leaves for a hawthorn. Some leaves are entirely smooth-edged, or have just a few (sometimes three) teeth at the apex only. These leaves are oblong, or ovate in shape. Other leaves are more sharply pointed, deeply lobed leaves. The former smooth leaf types can be found on the flowering shoots; the latter pointed types on the barren shoots. All the leaves are glossy, dark green in colour, and quite glabrous. The tree is heavily fruiting, with the long, narrow red berries attractive and a bird food source.

== Uses ==
The various-leaved Hawthorn has been in cultivation in European and American parks and gardens since the early nineteenth century. This hawthorn is considered a beautiful tree for ornamental use, bearing a rich glossy foliage, sometimes retained during winter months (semi-evergreen), and with heavy fruiting. William Jackson Bean comments that "It is a beautiful thorn ... bearing its large flowers and bright fruits freely. It is also one of the most distinct by reason of its variously shaped leaves, its long, narrow fruits, and the absence of down from the younger parts."

Today, mature specimens of the various-leaved Hawthorn can be seen in England where it has been formally planted, such as at the Royal Victoria Park in Bath; and in some places where it has naturalised, the most extensive such place being Abney Park Cemetery in London where it was planted long ago by Loddiges in an early Victorian garden cemetery arboretum.

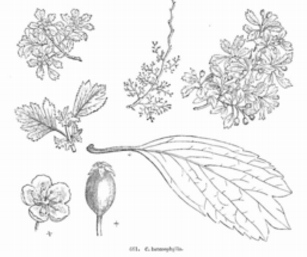
Various-leaved Hawthorn, early nineteenth-century drawing by Loudon.

== Taxonomy ==
This hawthorn can be confused even by experts with Crataegus monogyna, which has extremely variable leaf shape, and its origin is obscure. The tree was first described scientifically in 1808 in a French periodical. In England, it was also described in Dendrologia Britannica by the botanist P. W. Watson, but it is John Lindley's description that is better known, which used Flüggé's name Crataegus heterophylla, as is now used.

Reports that it is native to Spain appear to be based on misidentification of the Common Hawthorn (Crataegus monogyna). Some report it is only known in cultivation and not in the wild. It is thought by some to be a hybrid between the Crataegus monogyna and another species, perhaps the Azarole hawthorn (Crataegus azarolus). If it is of hybrid origin it may have arisen more than once.

=== Early confusion ===
Early ideas that it originated in North America were replaced by the perception that it has more in common with species from eastern Europe. Favouring an American origin was Joseph Paxton, who in 1840 listed it as having been introduced into Britain from North America in 1816. Also, A. P. de Candolle published its country of origin as North America in his Podromus in 1825. John Lindley in 1828 considered it to have little affinity with North American hawthorns, being closer to Eastern European species, and suggested it could be a relative of Azarole hawthorn (Crataegus azarolus), (under the name Crataegus maroccana Persoon). In the early twentieth century, William Jackson Bean described it similarly, as a native of Armenia. Today, other authors also list it as native to Eastern Europe from Georgia and the Caucasus to nearby parts of Western Asia.
