= Abney Park Cemetery =

One of the "Magnificent Seven" cemeteries in London, England

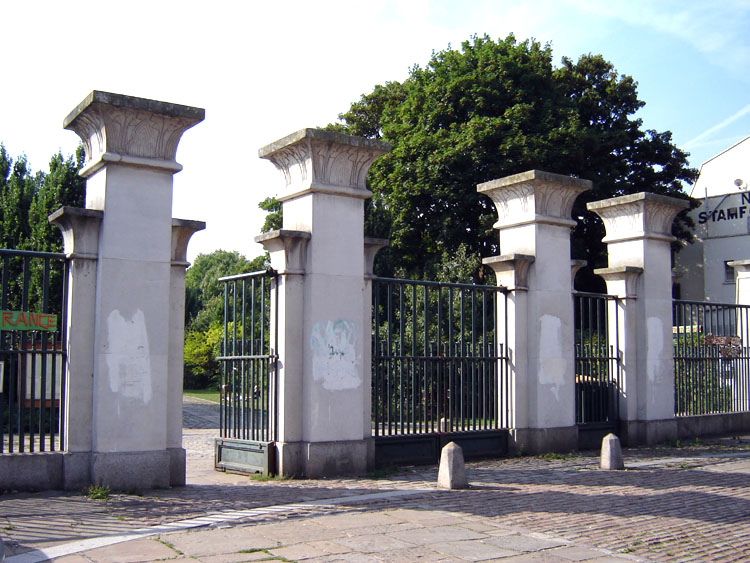
- Interactive map of Abney Park Cemetery

Details
- Established: 1840
- Location: Stoke Newington High Street, London
- Country: United Kingdom
- Coordinates: 51.5649°N 0.0781°W
- Type: Public
- Owned by: London Borough of Hackney
- Size: 12.53 hectares (31 acres)
- No. of interments: around 200,000
- Website: Abney Park Trust

Abney Park cemetery is one of the "Magnificent Seven" cemeteries in London, England.

Abney Park in Stoke Newington in the London Borough of Hackney is a historic parkland originally laid out in the early 18th century by Lady Mary Abney, Dr. Isaac Watts and the neighbouring Hartopp family.

In 1840 it became a non-denominational garden cemetery, a semi-public park arboretum, and an educational institute, which was widely celebrated as an example of its time. A total of 196,843 burials had taken place there up to the year 2000. It is a Local Nature Reserve.

== Location ==
The official address of Abney Park is Stoke Newington High Street, N16. The main gate is at the junction of this street and Rectory Road, with a smaller gate on Stoke Newington Church Street. The park lies within the London Borough of Hackney. The nearest station is the London Overground Stoke Newington railway station which is 200 metres from the Stoke Newington High Street entrance.

== Past and present ==
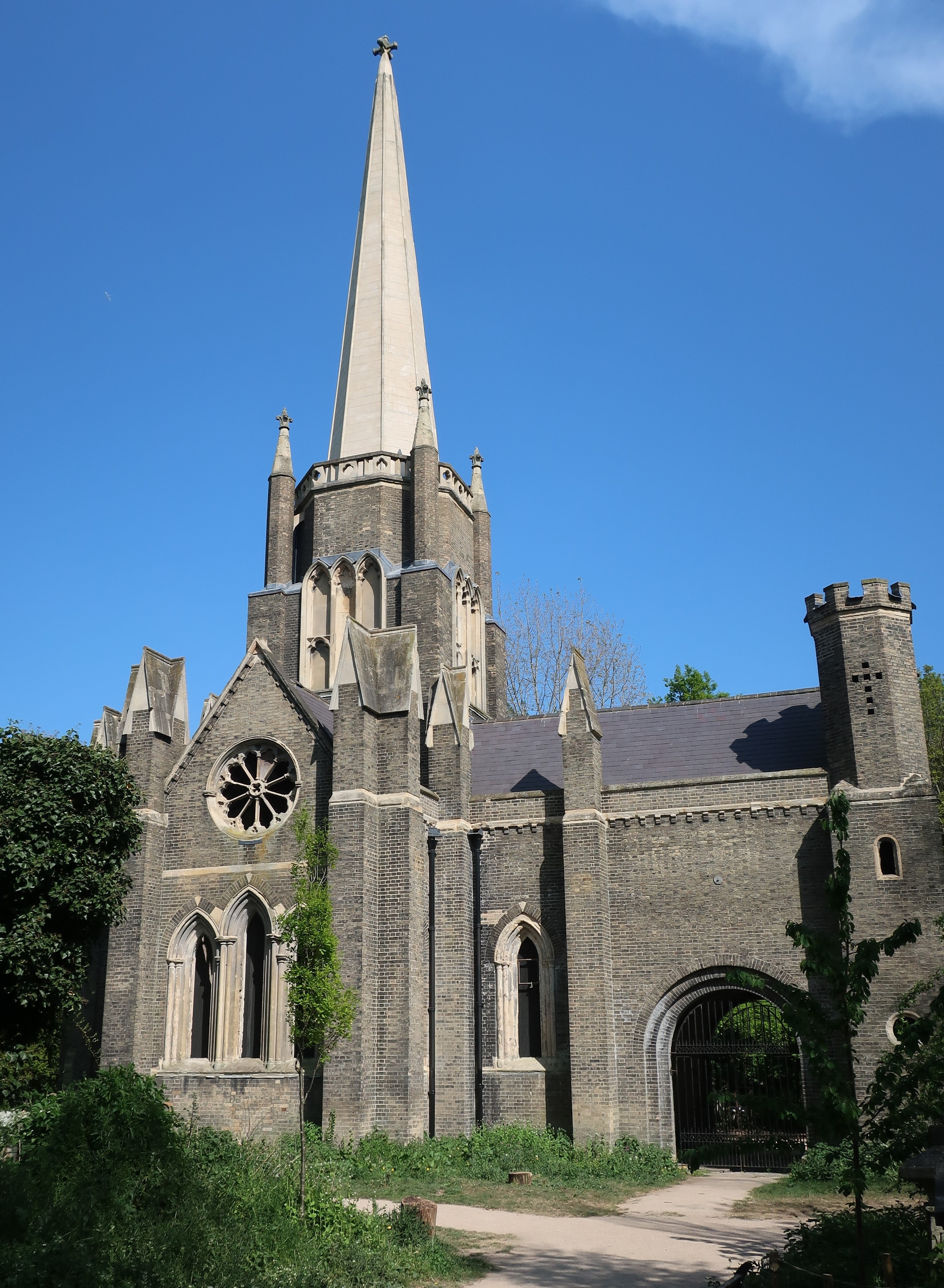
The central chapel (2020)

The cemetery is named after Sir Thomas Abney, who served as Lord Mayor of London in 1700–1701. The manor of Stoke Newington belonged to him in the early 18th century and his town house, Abney House, built in 1676, stood on the site of the present cemetery until its demolition in the 1830s.

In 1840, Abney Park opened as a model garden cemetery, a pioneering non-denominational place of rest. Its approach was based on the Congregational church's role in the London Missionary Society (LMS), whose fundamental principle was to develop a wholly non-denominational exemplar. It also drew on American burial ideas, specifically Mount Auburn in Massachusetts. Details of the Abney Park Cemetery Company can be found in the diaries of William Copeland Astbury (volumes covering 1831–48)

At first there were many links between Abney Park Cemetery and the LMS but this nonconformist (and in particular Congregationalist) period came to a close in the early 1880s when a strictly commercial general cemetery company was formed and the land at Abney Park was made over to the new enterprise. Though the park had not been formalised in 1840 as a cemetery through Act of Parliament or consecration, and Church faculty law never applied, burial ground use had, by the 1880s, come to predominate over the wider landscape, access and educational objects of its founders.

The founders' financial and legal structure, adapted from the model developed for garden cemeteries in America by City solicitor George Collison, aimed to establish a joint stock corporation managed by trustees. The trustees would be appointed by the members (those buying plots). Under the trust deed, the founders sought to preserve the park in perpetuity. The weakness of the model lay in the detail however, but this was not evident for 30 years. An eventual successful prosecution by the Crown ruled that despite their unusual business model and the way in which plots were seemingly sold as freehold land, the legal arrangements were actually inadequate to achieve a different status from any other commercial cemetery, either for the company or the registered keepers of plots. In consequence, company income could not be held in trust for the park, but was to be treated as for any other commercial profit-making company and taxed accordingly.

Eventually sold on the open market to a wholly commercially minded general cemetery company in the 1880s, established with a similar name, three new cemeteries were founded in London's suburbs or nearby countryside. From then onwards standardised park-like landscaping principles came to be applied at Abney Park, replacing much of the unique arboretum planting. Air pollution also took its toll, affecting the conifer walks. After the First World War, path infill began to be practised; a situation that became severe in the 1950s and was continued into the 1970s, when the commercial cemetery company went into liquidation.

In 1978, apart from one forecourt building, the park passed to the local council as a burial ground and open space subject to the Local Authorities Cemeteries Order of 1977. For the next twenty-one years, there being only a small number of residual burial and monuments rights, the Council worked with local groups and relatives to accommodate these rights, and exercise discretion to allow occasional courtesy burials, where families had previously held deeds from the cemetery company; but by and large nature was allowed to take its course.

Abney Park was included on the Heritage at Risk Register in 2009, as one of Britain's historic parks and gardens at risk from neglect and decay. Although the level of malicious damage is kept low by the conspicuous presence of staff and volunteers of the Abney Park Trust when maintaining the park; by frequent arts and environmental events promoted by the trust; and by community safety initiatives involving the police and their community support officers; nevertheless, over time it has taken its toll, leading to the current 'at risk' designation. The roof slates and roof flashings of the Abney Park Chapel have been damaged by unauthorised climbing and theft at times when the park was left unsupervised and unlocked overnight, and this has resulted in water seepage into the chapel walls which is now causing serious problems to the whole building. Similarly, from time to time, some sections of boundary wall become too weak due to people climbing over them, and decay has set in. However these matters could be put right and the park is a popular place to visit, with a range of educational, training and cultural events and an annual summer open day. It is a designated Local Nature Reserve and Conservation Area. Apart from the South Lodge extension on the forecourt, Abney Park's freehold is owned by the London Borough of Hackney.

The park occupies 12.53 hectares (31.0 acres), which includes a nature reserve, a classroom, a visitor's centre and a central chapel which is disused. The park is normally opened for free public access on weekdays and weekends from about 9.30 am to 5 pm.

== The Egyptian Revival entrance ==
One of the "Magnificent Seven" parkland cemeteries created in the early Victorian period, albeit set out in an entirely different way to the others and with somewhat wider purposes, Abney Park features an entrance designed by William Hosking in collaboration with Joseph Bonomi the Younger and the cemetery's founder George Collison. This frontage was built by John Jay in the increasingly popular Egyptian Revival style, with hieroglyphics signifying the "Abode of the Mortal Part of Man": a venture too far into the architecture of the African continent for Augustus Pugin, who pilloried the idea, hoping no-one would repeat such a radical departure from "good" Christian gothic design (see illustration for Grounds of a Quaker School). A similar criticism had previously been made when the first Egyptian-style entrance to a western cemetery had been constructed at Mount Auburn Cemetery in the 1830s, on which Abney Park Cemetery was partially modelled. By contrast, figures who appreciated the composition complimented Hosking and Bonomi on their scholarly frontage design; an arbiter of design taste, John Loudon, described it as a "judicious combination of two lodges with gates between".

Abney Park has a claim to be the earliest complete design for a permanent "Egyptian Revival" entranceway at a cemetery anywhere in the world. The gateway at Mount Auburn Cemetery, from which it took its inspiration, was at that time still a temporary structure, being made of dusted wood and sand; its permanent design was not built until two years after Abney Park opened. In England there were already some examples of the use of Egyptian Revival architecture on a small scale, including one example of a small gate installed at a cemetery for Nonconformists near Sheffield in 1836. However, Abney Park Cemetery became the first to employ the style for cemetery buildings, and also the first to introduce it for a complete entrance design.

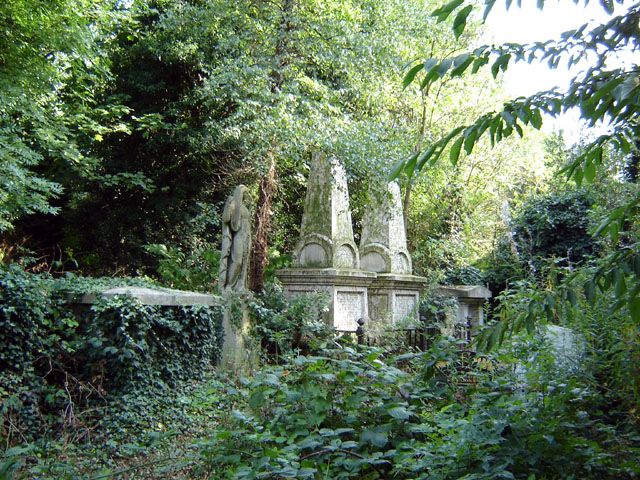
Every turn reveals a different landscape.

At Abney Park the use of motifs not associated with contemporary faith served a profound purpose, since it was consciously opened as the first wholly nondenominational garden cemetery in Europe. True, other garden cemeteries sometimes used the term loosely, meaning only that they had laid out more than one denominational area or built more than one chapel. Abney Park Cemetery was the first to be laid out with "no invidious dividing lines" separating the burial areas of one faith or religious group from any other. Even its one chapel, the Abney Park Chapel, a feast of Puritan or northern European brick gothic yet with ample stone dressings and a little neoclassical design woven into its early Dissenting Gothic design style, had but one central chamber for the common use of all, and but one entrance. As such it was the first nondenominational cemetery chapel in Europe. William Hosking, in being handed the task of achieving this vision, became the first architect to design such a cemetery chapel in Europe. Underpinning this was a unique legal basis in comparison with the other garden cemeteries of its period; Abney Park was not set aside solely for cemetery use by Act of Parliament, and was not formally consecrated as burial land. Perhaps more so than any other it was entitled to be considered as a park as well as a cemetery.

Today it is accommodating this wide role again; burial rights ceased when the private company closed in 1978, enabling the park to now facilitate a wide range of projects in the arts, education, nature conservation and walking/recreation, besides offering new memorial trees and benches where ashes are scattered, and the occasional discretionary or courtesy burial.

== Landscape ==
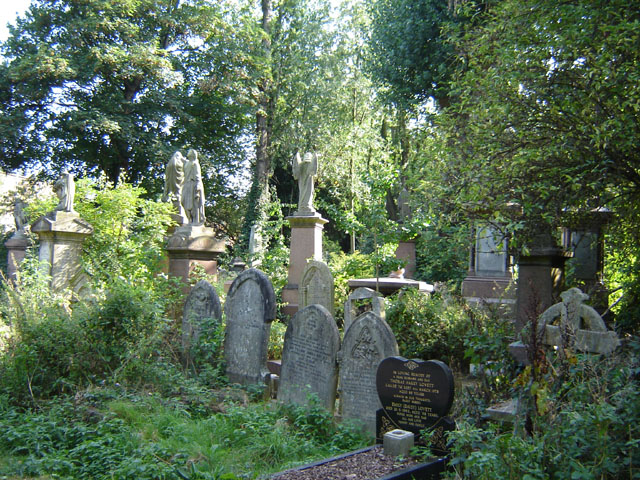
Nature takes its course, as interments are rare. The grave in the foreground, dating from 1992, is an exception (September 2005).

Abney Park was unique in being the first arboretum to be combined with a cemetery in Europe; offering an educational attraction that was originally set in a landscape of fields and woods, some distance from the built-up boundary of London. Its 2,500 trees and shrubs were all labelled, and arranged around the perimeter alphabetically, from A for Acer (maple trees) to Z for Zanthoxylum (American toothache trees).

The emphasis on an educational landscape, as opposed to one purely aesthetic, visually attractive picturesque, drew partly on a simplified version of John Loudon's 'Gardenesque' concept, and applied something akin to this, but with a unique alphabetical approach, and no structural mounding, to a picturesque cemetery design. It was much admired by Loudon, who described the Cemetery as "the most highly ornamented cemetery in the vicinity of London", albeit that he favoured a more formal and classical approach to garden cemetery design as a general rule and, in 1843 developed design principles for such an approach.

At the cemetery the botanical planting was carefully sited since the design sought to do as little as possible to change the existing picturesque parkland. This careful approach drew on that used at Mount Auburn Cemetery near Boston where Dearborn had emphasised the compatibility of horticulture and even an experimental garden with a cemetery, leading to the opening of a cemetery supported by the Massachusetts Horticultural Society; one that succeeded in establishing a picturesque landscape coupled with botanical garden specimens and an adjoining scientific garden. There were important differences, however; the New England cemetery had benefited from a more sylvan setting than that of Abney Park, and a much larger estate. Nonetheless, the ties were evident. The founding directors of the Abney Park project were all Congregationalists, who together with other nonconformists had strong links with their brethren in the New World, to where they had emigrated in search of religious freedom. George Collison, Abney Park Cemetery's company secretary, and the key force behind its radical design, recorded his visit to, and impressions of, Mount Auburn Cemetery, in a book published to coincide with the opening of the Stoke Newington cemetery. It also contains a complete list of all the arboretum species and varieties planted at Abney Park.

The concept of the arboretum—and indeed also a rosarium—was inspired by George Loddiges, a local Hackney nurseryman who became a small shareholder in the cemetery company and was appointed to lead its landscape design, planting and educational labelling, to complement William Hosking's layout and building and engineering (drainage) scheme. The pair worked closely as a design team under the guiding influence of the third designer George Collison, who represented the client company both as its solicitor and principal learned visionary. Loddiges' earlier experience in designing an A to Z arboretum at his Mare Street nursery, and possession of one of the largest ranges of trees and shrubs then grown for sale in Britain, ensured success.

The overall effect was to establish Abney Park as the most impressively landscaped garden cemetery of its period. However, Loddiges Nursery closed by 1854 and thereafter maintenance of the trees and shrubs and of their botanical labels, was impaired. Today Loddiges' work is of unparalleled significance to landscape design, being recognised as of European importance. Abney Park was the first London cemetery to be invited to join the Association of Significant Cemeteries in Europe (ASCE) and it is the only surviving example of an English landscape designed by Loddiges.

== The Campo Santo of the Dissenters ==
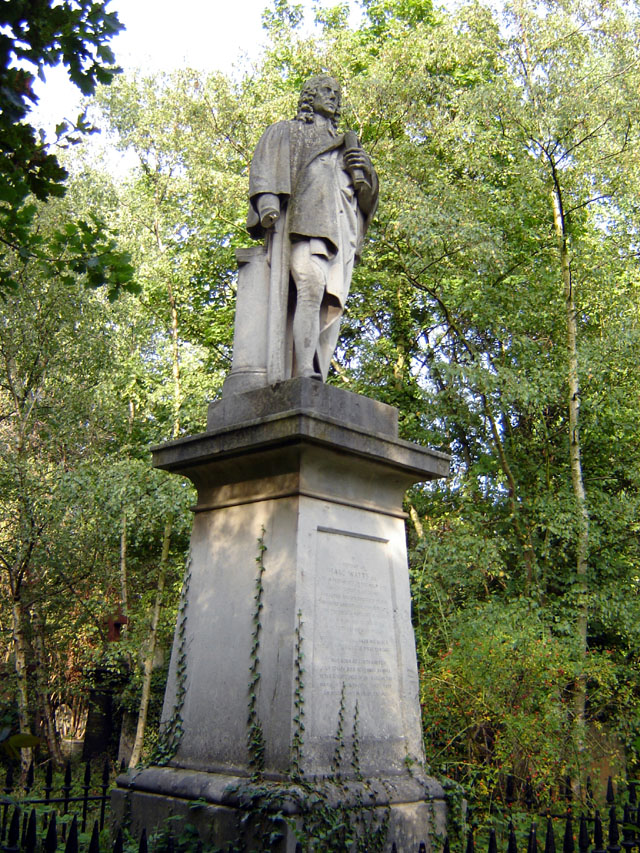
Dr Isaac Watts' Statue (September 2005).

Such an elaborate planting scheme for a park cemetery may also be a reflection of the symbolic importance the founding directors attached to the land that formed Abney Park Cemetery. As nonconformists, who treasured the independence of their religious beliefs—and therefore practised Christianity outside of the established Church of England—they held the land itself to be of immense significance, for it had previously been two neighbouring and inter-related 18th-century parkland estates, the grounds of Abney House and Fleetwood House, where the non-conformist Doctor of Divinity, educationalist and poet Dr. Isaac Watts lived and taught, and indeed wrote several of his popular books and hymns.

Due to these religious associations, Abney Park Cemetery rapidly became the most attractive Victorian resting place for nonconformist or dissenting ministers and educationalists, principally those from a Protestant dissenting tradition. Indeed, it stands today as the most important burial place in the UK of 19th-century Congregational, Baptist, Methodist and Salvation Army ministers and educationalists, including Christopher Newman Hall and many others, some of whom are mentioned below. Whereas Bunhill Fields was described by the poet Robert Southey as "the 'Campo Santo' of the Dissenters" in a reference to the monumental cemetery of that name in Pisa, Italy — 'camposanto' (literally "holy field") being one of the Italian words for 'cemetery'— in respect of its late 17th- and 18th-century burials, Abney Park took on the mantle during the Victorian period in the writings of E. Paxton Hood for the Religious Tract Society.

Though it primarily attracted Congregational, Methodist and Salvation Army nonconformists, rather than certain other nonconformists such as Quakers, or non-Protestant nonconformists such as Catholics or Jewish people, Abney Park Cemetery more than any other 19th-century cemetery was open to the burial of all regardless of their religious convictions or leanings. Whilst its founding directors were all Congregationalists and they were concerned to find a place for such burials, they expressly established the Stoke Newington cemetery as the first fully nondenominational cemetery in Europe (where anyone could be buried anywhere). Selection of a site with historical associations with Dr Isaac Watts served this purpose well, for he had been honoured in death with a bust in the Anglican Westminster Abbey to complement his burial at the Independent's Bunhill Fields. Subsequently, his hymns and scholarly works had become widely used and referred to by many denominations, such that in the 19th century the Rev. John Stroughton could write: "Dr. Watts was as far removed from sectarianism as a man could be". Abney Park Chapel, sometimes referred to informally as Dr Watts' Chapel, became its spiritual and landscape focal point. It sits in the heart of the cemetery; its axial walk to Church Street, called Dr Watts' Walk, was chosen in 1845 as the most appropriate site in London for a public statue to the great man, sculpted by Edward Hodges Baily, RA FRS.

== Educational establishments ==
Besides its religious associations, Abney Park has a strong educational pedigree. For example, its prominent director in the mid-to-late Victorian era, Charles Reed, was also the Chairman of the London School Board and Hackney's first MP. In fact, this part of north London, particularly Newington Green, had a long history of innovative education for boys and young men, known as dissenting academies.

Abney House was the first premises in England to be used exclusively as a Wesleyan training college, from c. 1838. This followed use of temporary, shared facilities in Hackney, and prior to the building of their own spacious colleges and grounds, one in the north of England, and a second at Richmond Hill, to which the college at Abney Park moved in 1843. Abney House was then demolished. The governorship of the seminary was held by Rev. John Farrar, Secretary of the Methodist Conference on fourteen occasions and twice its elected president.

Next to Abney House on Church Street was Fleetwood House, used as the base for Newington Academy for Girls, which was founded in 1824 by, among others, the Quaker scientist and abolitionist William Allen and run in a most enlightened and imaginative way by Susanna Corder, who later emigrated for a while to Boston USA and emerged as a talented biographer. It lost exclusive use of attractive grounds in the eastern part of Abney Park on formation of the cemetery, leaving only the school house and a small garden for the private use of the students. However, they were welcome to use the new cemetery's educational arboretum and this, along with Abney Park as a whole, was rarely shared with many others in the early years of the new cemetery, except at weekends. The school's innovative approach included transport arrangements; it commissioned the first school bus in the world.

== Famous people: burials and associations in the park ==
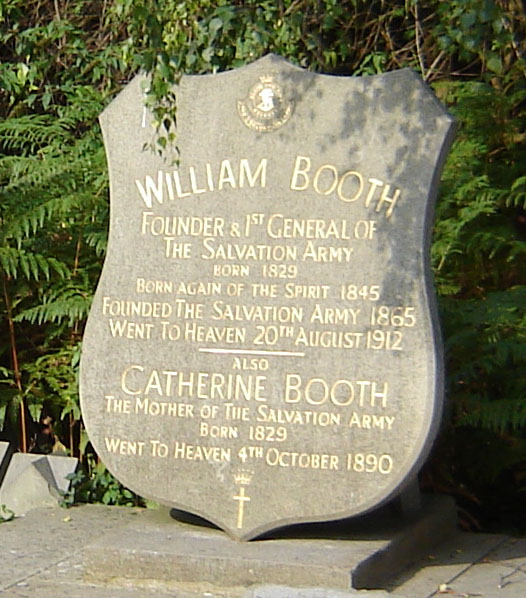
This sandstone plaque marks the grave of William and Catherine Booth. Their son and other SA commissioners are buried nearby. (September 2005).

Most notably, William and Catherine Booth, founders of The Salvation Army, are buried in a prominent location close to Church Street and next to their son Bramwell Booth and various SA commissioners, including Elijah Cadman, John Lawley, James Dowdle, William Ridsdel, Frederick Booth-Tucker, George Scott Railton, the Army's first Commissioner, Theodore Kitching and T. Henry Howard, its Chief of Staff.

Earlier in the 19th century, one of the hottest issues for political and social reform was the abolition of slavery, and Stoke Newington and the Quakers, separately and together, played a prominent role in this. Indeed, William Wilberforce himself planned to be buried in the village at St Mary's Church with his sister, his will being overturned on his death since parliament considered a state funeral at Westminster Abbey more fitting. Wilberforce's brother-in-law, the abolitionist lawyer James Stephen, was also a frequent visitor, as his father lived at the Fleetwood Summerhouse adjacent to Abney Park. Dr Thomas Binney, the "Archbishop of Non-conformity", has a portrait in the National Portrait Gallery that shows him at the Anti-Slavery Society Convention in 1840 (with Josiah Conder); Binney is buried close to the Church Street entrance in Abney Park Cemetery. Christopher Newman Hall, who was influential on the side of slavery emancipation in the American Civil War, is buried here with his father. So is Rev. James Sherman, who wrote the introduction to Harriet Beecher Stowe's hugely influential Uncle Tom's Cabin. The novel was partly based on Josiah Henson, whose escape to freedom in Britain was assisted by the philanthropist Samuel Morley, who is buried in the cemetery. The Rev. Joseph Ketley, a Congregational missionary and abolitionist in Demerara, is also interred here, as is Rev. Dr John Morison, patron of the escaped slave and influential African-American autobiographer Moses Roper.

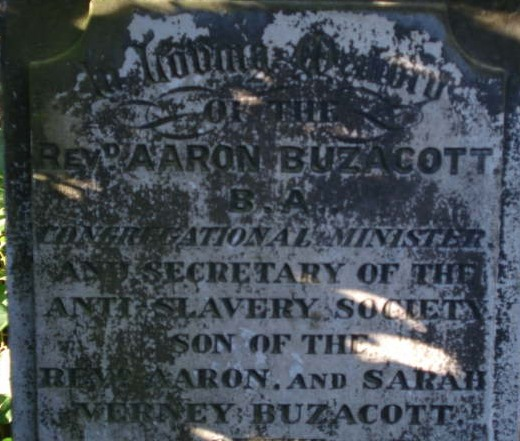
Memorial to Aaron Buzacott, Secretary of the Anti-Slavery Society, now Anti-Slavery International.

Recently rediscovered is the grave of Olaudah Equiano's daughter Joanna Vassa, as he was a well-known former slave who worked for abolition. Jamaican emancipation is represented directly by the Rev. Samuel Oughton and the Rev. Thomas Burchell, who only narrowly escaped death at the hands of the planters; and their underlying Baptist support by Nathaniel Rogers M.D. Aaron Buzacott, the second Secretary of Anti-Slavery International, originally known as the Anti-Slavery Society, is buried here.

At Abney Park Cemetery there are also some of the early settlers in Britain from the four corners of the world, such as the African, Thomas Caulker, the son of the King of Bompey (now Sierra Leone), who signed an anti-slavery agreement that became part of an Act of Parliament in the 1850s; and Leota, a native of the Samoa Islands whose life in London was due to the work of the London Missionary Society who sought to build schools and bring scripture to the inhabitants of the South Seas. Abney Park is one of the main burial places of 19th-century missionaries; here, for example is the burial place of William Ellis, John Williams' wife and son, Dr Walter Henry Medhurst, and Edward Stallybrass. Also Sarah Buzacott, the wife of Aaron Buzacott the elder, who was a teacher at the London Missionary Society college at Rarotonga in the South Seas. Many nonconformist divines are also buried here, for example Dr Alexander Fletcher, 'The Children's Friend'.

The Afro-Caribbean Harlem Renaissance writer and journalist Eric Derwent Walrond (1898–1966) is buried at the cemetery.

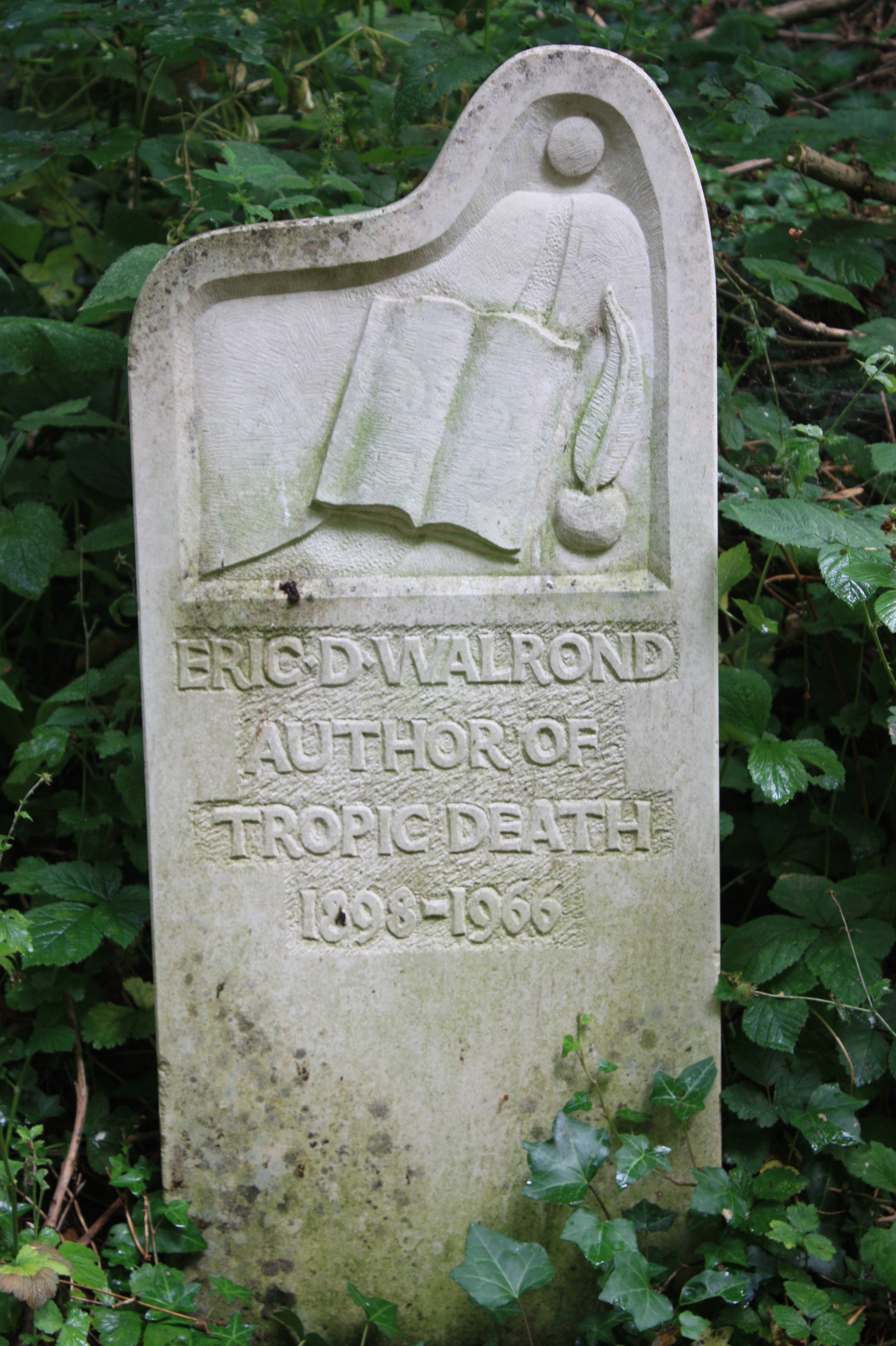
The grave of Eric D Walrond

The evangelist Emily Gosse is buried in a simple grave near Dr Watts' Mound.

Close to Church Street is the burial of one of the cemetery's early director and trustees, one of the first two Members of Parliament for Hackney Sir Charles Reed. Close by lies his father Dr Andrew Reed (1788–1862), a student of Rev. George Collison and founder of the London Orphan Asylum. In 1834, along with the Rev. J. Matheson, Andrew Reed was sent to the Congregational Churches of America by the Congregational Union of England and Wales as a deputation to promote peace and friendship between the two communities. He spent six months in America and during his stay there Yale University conferred upon him an honorary Doctorate of Divinity. This strengthened the Congregationalists' transatlantic links, ensuring the Rev George Collison's son a welcome when he visited to gain ideas for Abney Park cemetery's design from Mount Auburn Cemetery.

Here too is the Welsh MP Henry Richard, a mid-19th-century secretary of the Peace Society, instrumental in encouraging the university in Wales at Aberystwyth along with its founder Sir Hugh Owen, whose own memorial is to the east of the Abney Park Cedar Circle. Also buried here is Betsi Cadwaladr, a Welsh nurse who worked in the Crimea with Florence Nightingale. The Peace Society is well represented at Abney Park; two of its other 19th-century secretaries, Rev. Nun Morgan Harry and Rev. John Jefferson, original minister for the chapel and cemetery, are also buried here. Rajendra Chandra Chandra, Professor of Calcutta Medical College and physician, is buried here with his wife. Charlotte A. Gray, the temperance leader who founded the International Anti-Alcohol Congresses, is also buried here.

Pioneering fire fighter James Braidwood, credited with forming the first municipal fire brigade; Edward Calvert, painter; engraver and painter and novelist Isabella Banks and her husband the newspaper editor and playwright George Linnaeus Banks; and the African-Jamaican Baptist missionary Rev. Joseph Jackson Fuller, are also buried in the park. So too are Rev William Brock D.D., John Hoppus D.D. of University College London, and John Harris D.D. and Robert Halley of New College London.

Amongst the theatre and music hall performers resting at Abney Park are George Leybourne, Nelly Power, Albert Chevalier, G. W. Hunt, Herbert Campbell, Edmund Payne, Maie Ash and her surviving husband Fred Allandale, W. H. Pennington, Dan Crawley, Walter Laburnum and Fred Albert. These graves are cared for by the theatre charity The Music Hall Guild of Great Britain and America who undertake memorial restorations.

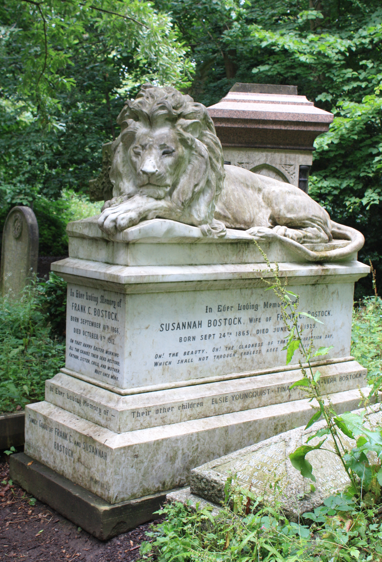
The grave of Frank C. Bostock

Other burials at the cemetery include the Chartist leader and publisher James "Bronterre" O'Brien, whose life and work is celebrated at the cemetery each year, especially by the Irish community and those in the Labour Movement; Dr John Pye Smith, the first dissenter to be elected a Fellow of the Royal Society; Mary Hays, the feminist writer and friend of Mary Wollstonecraft; and Thomas William Robertson the dramatic author. John O'Connor Power (1846–1919), Irish Member of Parliament for County Mayo, orator, barrister, radical journalist and author of The Making of an Orator is buried here with his wife's family. A Victoria Cross recipient from the Indian Mutiny, Private John Freeman, is buried here, as are world record-holder in motor-paced cycling Tommy Hall and the public hangman William Calcraft.

In a different way, Frank C. Bostock is remembered, largely due to the dominance of his life-sized marble lion alongside a path close to the chapel. Along with the Wombwells, the Bostocks were mainly responsible for bringing Asian and African animals to the attention of the Victorian and Edwardian public. For part of the year giraffes lived close to the cemetery at a small farm in Yoakley Road.

== First and Second World Wars ==
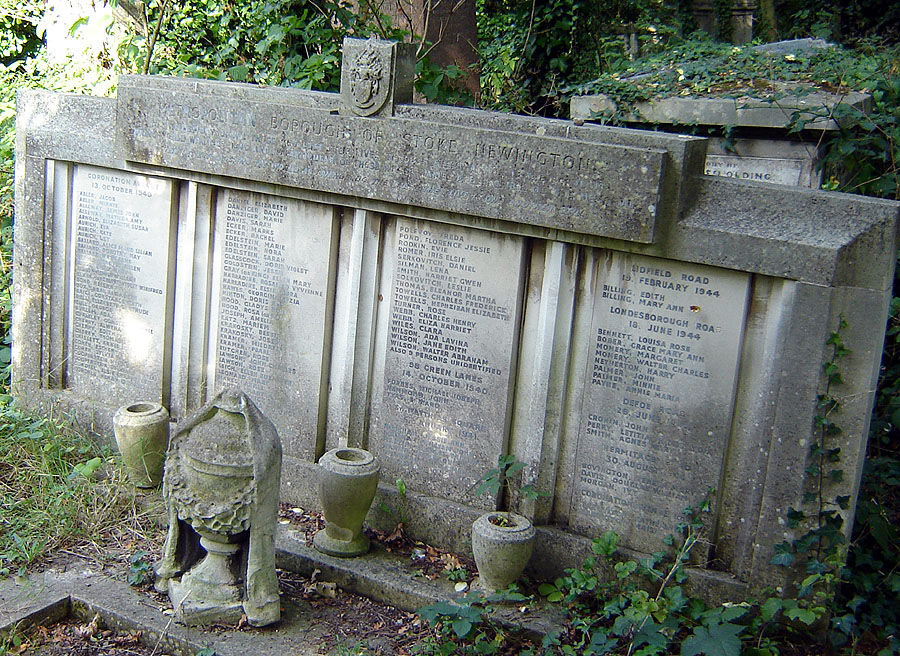
Abney Park Blitz memorial. Most of the space is taken up with the names of the victims of the 1940 Coronation Avenue incident (September 2005).

Abney Park contains war graves to 377 Commonwealth service personnel who died in the two World Wars and which are registered by the Commonwealth War Graves Commission. Unusually, Stoke Newington has two "Cross of Sacrifice" monuments constructed shortly after the end of World War I based on Reginald Blomfield's famous design: one on the lawn in front of St. Mary's Church on Church Street, and one in front of the south-facing facade of Abney Park Chapel in the cemetery. The names associated with the first cross are displayed a short distance away (inside the foyer of the public library on Church Street) whilst the names of those associated with the second cross (those who are interred in the cemetery but whose graves could not be given individual headstones) are recorded on a north-facing Screen Wall memorial added to the platform on which it stands.

The cemetery's "Cross of Sacrifice" serves as a landmark, but though rising on a rag-stone platform of contrasting Portland stone, it cannot be viewed on the approach from Church Street since the cemetery company chose to infill Dr Watts' axial walk at the time the war memorial was erected, so they designed the platform screen wall to prevent the cross from being seen from the south. The Trust hopes to change this if a redesign can be agreed, so as to display the cross to be seen from more directions and as a vantage point and focal point overlooking both directions of the original axis from the chapel spire and its ogee arch along Dr Watts' Walk, and on to Abney House gate; the axis that commemorates the life of the Rev. Dr Isaac Watts. Slightly off this exact axial alignment, is the small Blitz memorial that records civilian deaths, closer to the south entrance (picture right).

Though it suffered extensive property damage in the war, Stoke Newington's death toll was relatively low by the standards of some other Hackney districts like Shoreditch, and it would have been lower still, were it not for one incident on 13 October 1940, when a German bomb made a direct hit on a crowded shelter at Coronation Avenue, just off the High Street. Most people in the shelter were killed and, as the illustration shows, the list of the dead from this one incident takes up nearly three of the four panels on the memorial. Many of the dead were Jewish and some were refugees from the Nazis.

== "Sweet Auburn" and woodland wildlife ==
"The Deserted Village"
by Oliver Goldsmith
poem	Sweet Auburn! loveliest village of the plain Where health and plenty cheered the labouring swain, Where smiling spring its earliest visits paid, And parting summer's lingering blooms delayed: Dear lovely bowers of innocence and ease, Seats of my youth, where every sport could please, How often have I loitered o'er your green,
link	http://www.netpoets.com/classic/poems/030003.htm

Abney Park Cemetery was the only garden cemetery of its era to be influenced by New World cemetery design ideas due to the strong links between its founders and New England; in particular Boston. The cemetery reflects the design style adopted for Mount Auburn, for example in its use of an Egyptian Revival entrance and arboretum. However, though its "model" lay in the New World, it drew on different romantic landscape associations. Whereas Mount Auburn Cemetery celebrated the 'Sweet Auburn' of poetry, in particular the nature and woodland associated with the Auburn village area, it was the "romance" of religious and historical associations that primarily attracted the founders of London's first nondenominational garden cemetery, to Lady Mary Abney's estate which had served as an inspiration to Isaac Watts. Nonetheless, on its opening, Abney Park was by far the most sylvan of garden cemeteries in Britain; its many stately trees imbued the landscape with a uniquely well-timbered inheritance or "green cloak", and plans were put in train to encourage this further with collections of trees arranged along, and set back from, path edges. Whereas the cemetery at Mount Auburn had been blessed with a natural woodland setting, well suited to its founders' ethos of creating an Elysian paradise, Abney Park would take some time to more closely reflect its predominantly woodland style of cemetery design and a more transcendental view of nature as proposed by Emerson, and Thoreau in New England.

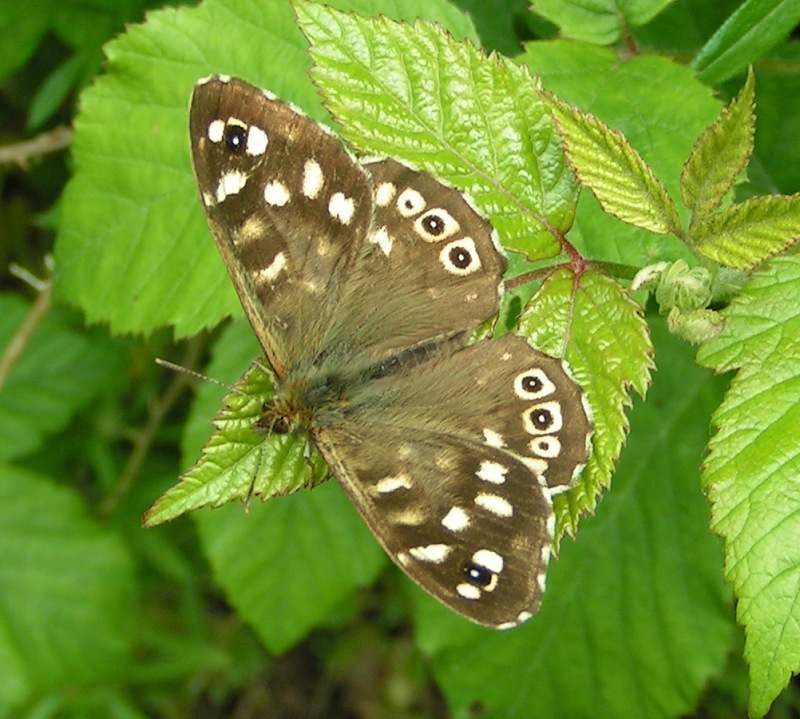
A female speckled wood butterfly

Slowly, however, time has healed this difference and the landscape at Abney Park has grown closer to its New World cousin. Mature trees and woodland now adorn Abney Park, completing its transformation into a woodland cemetery. This has been so profound a change that by the early 1990s the cemetery was acknowledged to be the largest woodland ecosystem in North London so close to the centre of the City of London, and became designated as the first statutory Local Nature Reserve in the London Borough of Hackney.

Under careful management, the woodland is slowly becoming enriched through natural regeneration and urban symbiosis, co-existing with its long use as a Borough park open to the public. The northern areas are slowly returning to native oaks with a hornbeam and hawthorn understory, and a woodland ground flora that includes wood false brome grass and wood spurge; the whole being interspersed with naturalising exotic thorns and service trees. Meanwhile, the sandy brickearth soils that extend from Church Street along Dr Watts' Walk to the chapel lawns, the sole surviving heathland in Hackney, are returning to a lighter structure based on silver birch woodland and healthy species such as bracken fern. Today, a range of woodland birds, mammals and butterflies are supported, having grown in large numbers over the decades alongside the many humans and companion animals who use the grounds as a local park run by the Borough, and forming one of North London's largest breeding sites so close to the city for some species such as the speckled wood butterfly.

Nature changes gradually, however, and the ecology may need active habitat management moderated by the consensus of local residents, park users and their representatives that informs Hackney Council, if these semi-natural sylvan qualities are to be preserved and enhanced, and to ensure that the naturalising exotic arboretum trees (such as various-leaved hawthorn and service tree of Fontainebleau) and plans for the replacement of Loddiges' perimeter A to Z arboretum, contribute their valuable educational and botanical interest to parts of the grounds.

== Endpiece ==
Part of a Victorian account of a visit to admire the beauties of Abney Park Cemetery reads:

There is a beautiful cemetery in Stoke Newington, and it was given to the inhabitants in memory of Lady Abney, who was a sincere friend to Dr. Watts. There is in it a pretty little church, where funeral services are performed by all denominations of Christians.

Lady Abney was very liberal in her religious views, and the cemetery is, with its church, open to all alike, and though its grounds were never consecrated, yet many rigid churchmen have been buried in it. There is no quieter burial spot within a dozen miles of London in any direction, and there are cedars of Lebanon in it, wide lawns, and beautiful flowers.

There is an old clergyman in the church, who is always ready to officiate for a small fee on funeral occasions. He is over eighty years old, his hair is like the snow, and he is a fit companion to such a solemn place.

One shining evening, with a female friend we visited the cemetery, and stopped in the little [largely] Gothic chapel to talk with the venerable clergyman. The tears actually sprung over his eyelids when we said that we came from America.

The old man asked a thousand questions about the wonderful far land of liberty in the west, which we were glad to answer. Almost every family among the poor respectable classes in England, has some member, or relation in America.

== Gallery ==
Abney Park Cemetery is one of the Magnificent Seven and one of the five of these cemeteries which are located north of the river Thames.

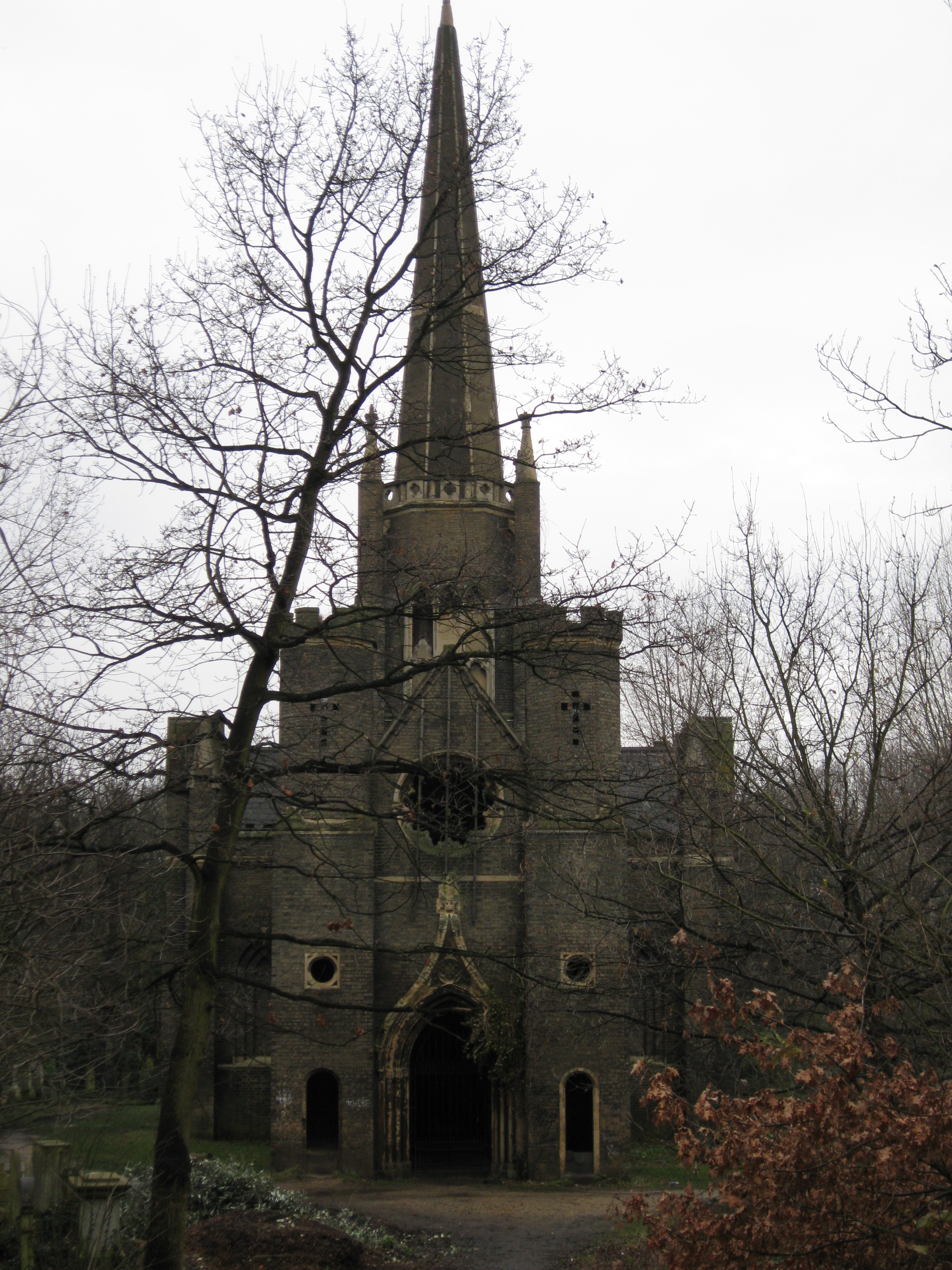
View of the Gothic Chapel from the War Monument

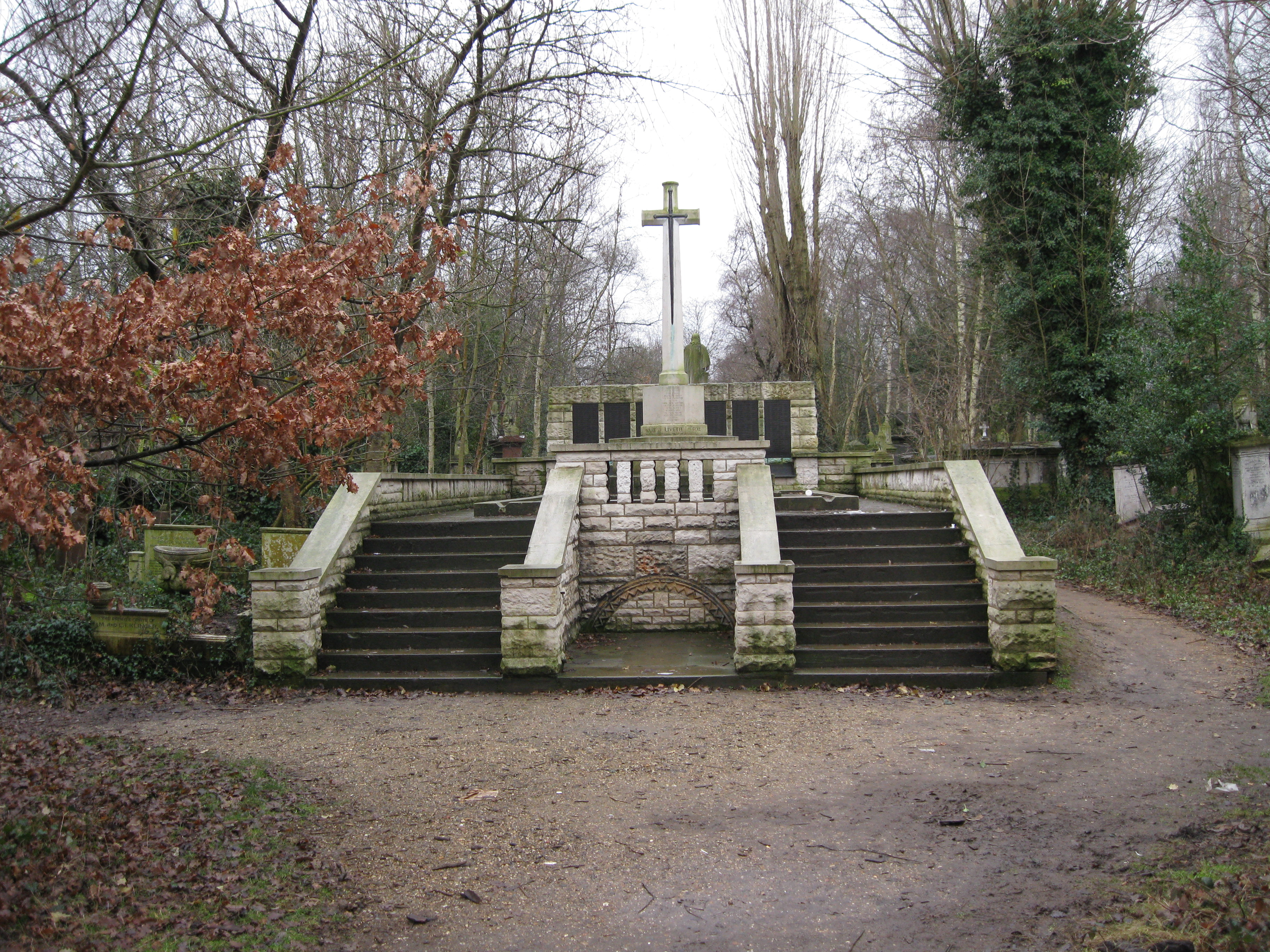
Overview of the Monument to the Great Wars

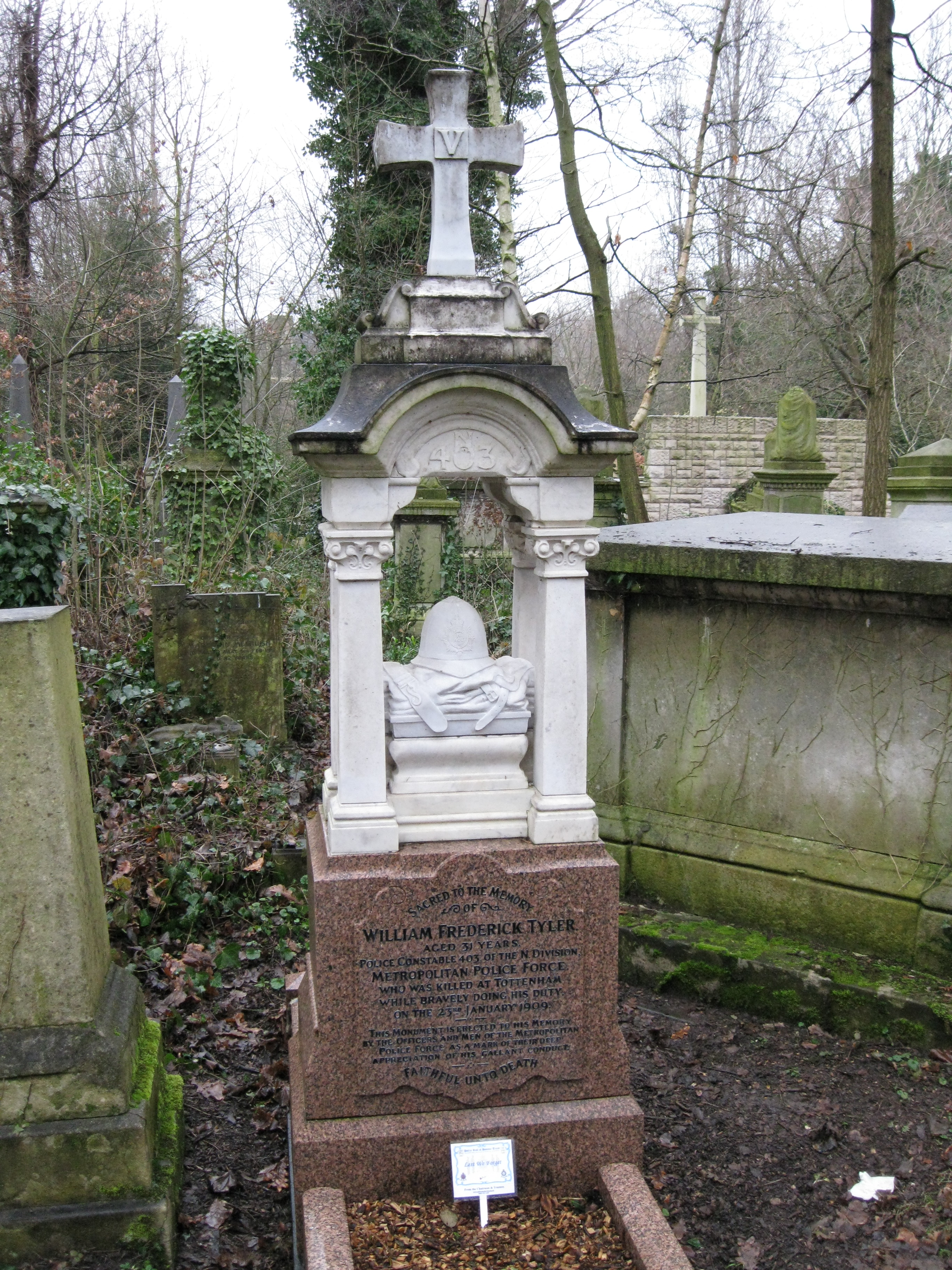
The memorial to PC William Frederick Tyler who died on duty in 1909 in the Tottenham Outrage (Grave K06:114880)

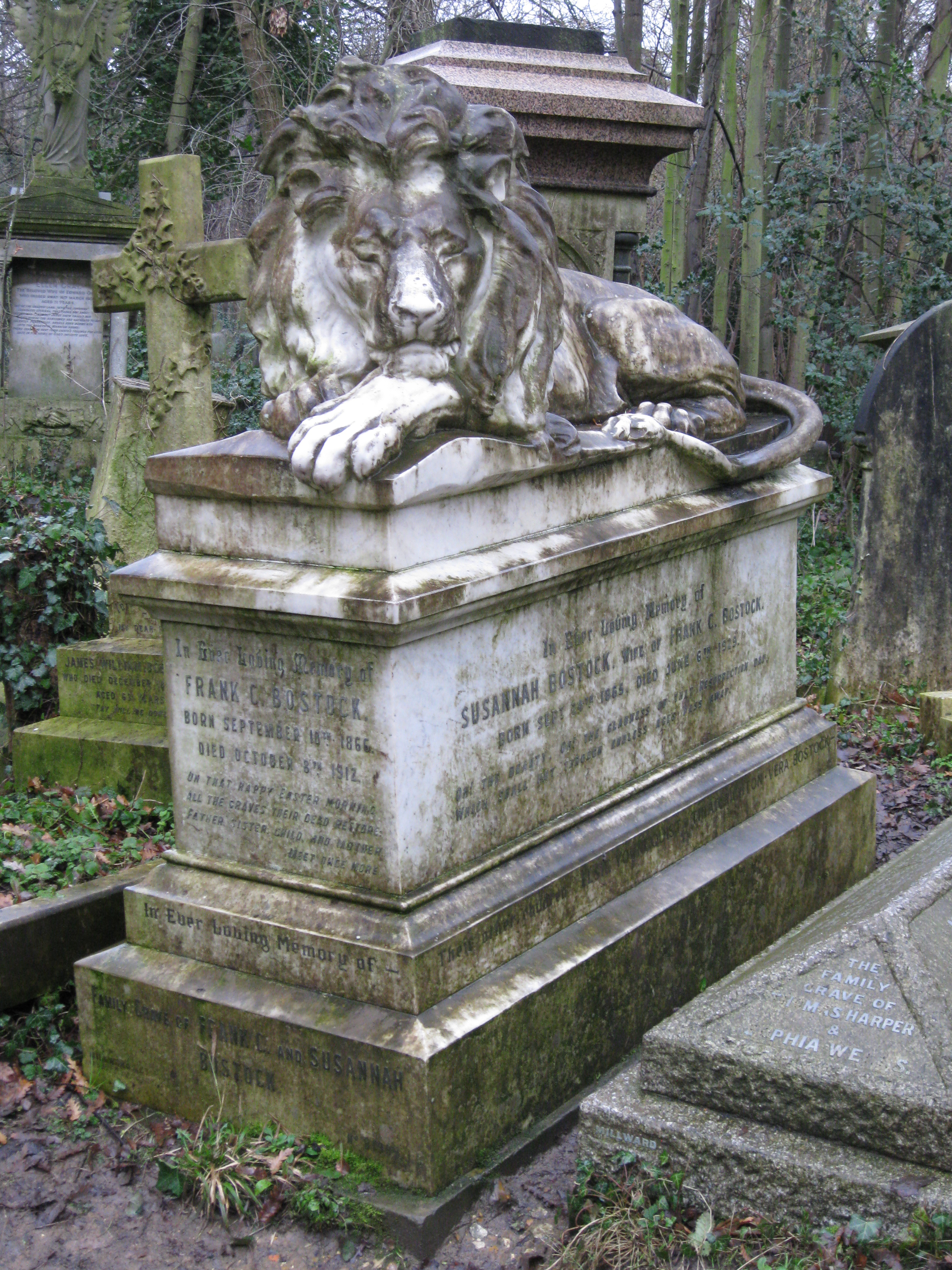
The lion on the grave of Frank, Susannah and Emmie Bostock (Grave J05:081999)

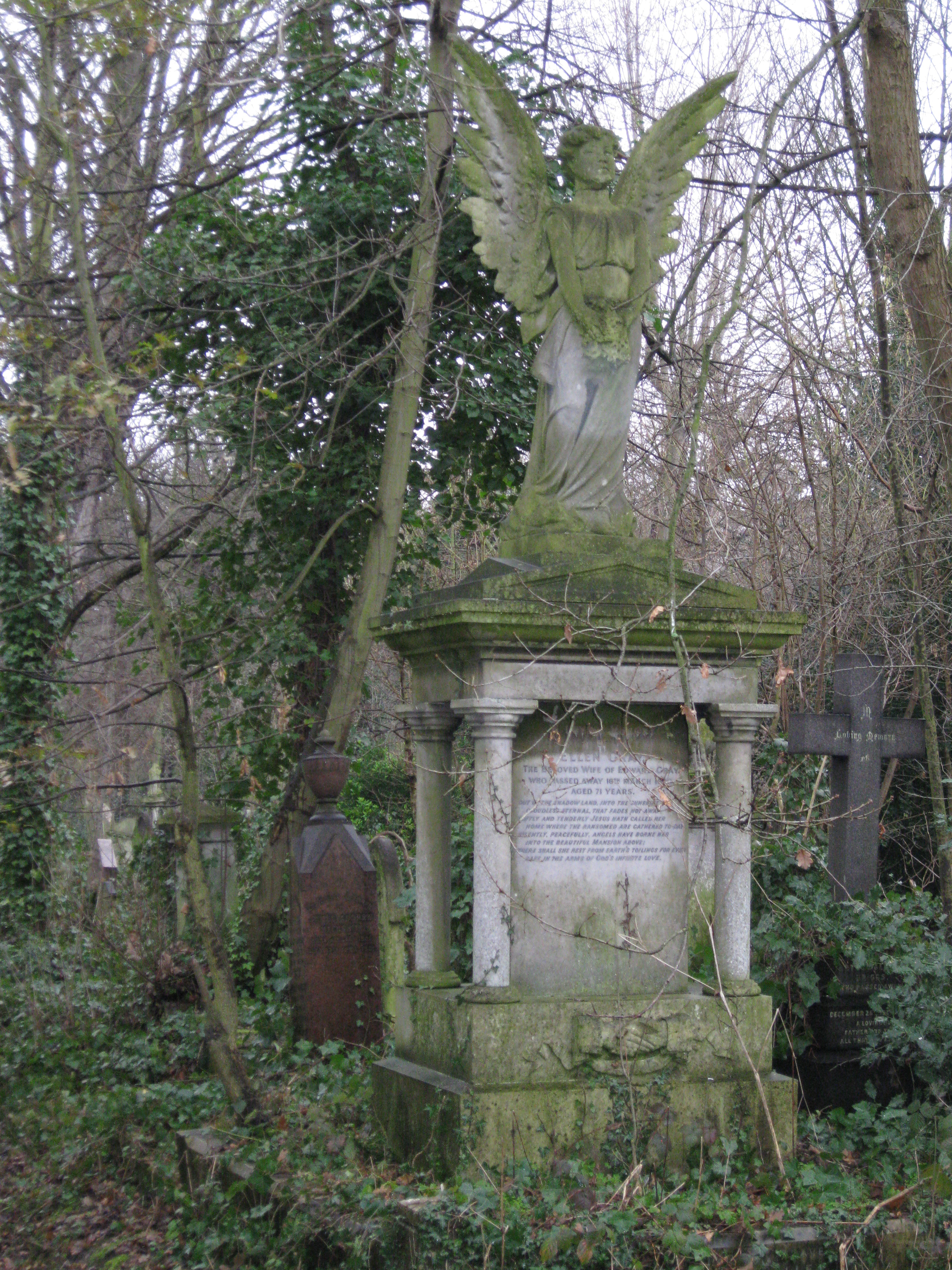
The angel on the grave of Ellen Gray (Grave J05:151328)

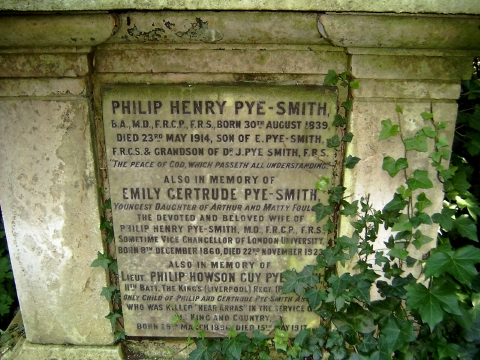
Family tomb of Pye-Smith family (Grave K06:006182)

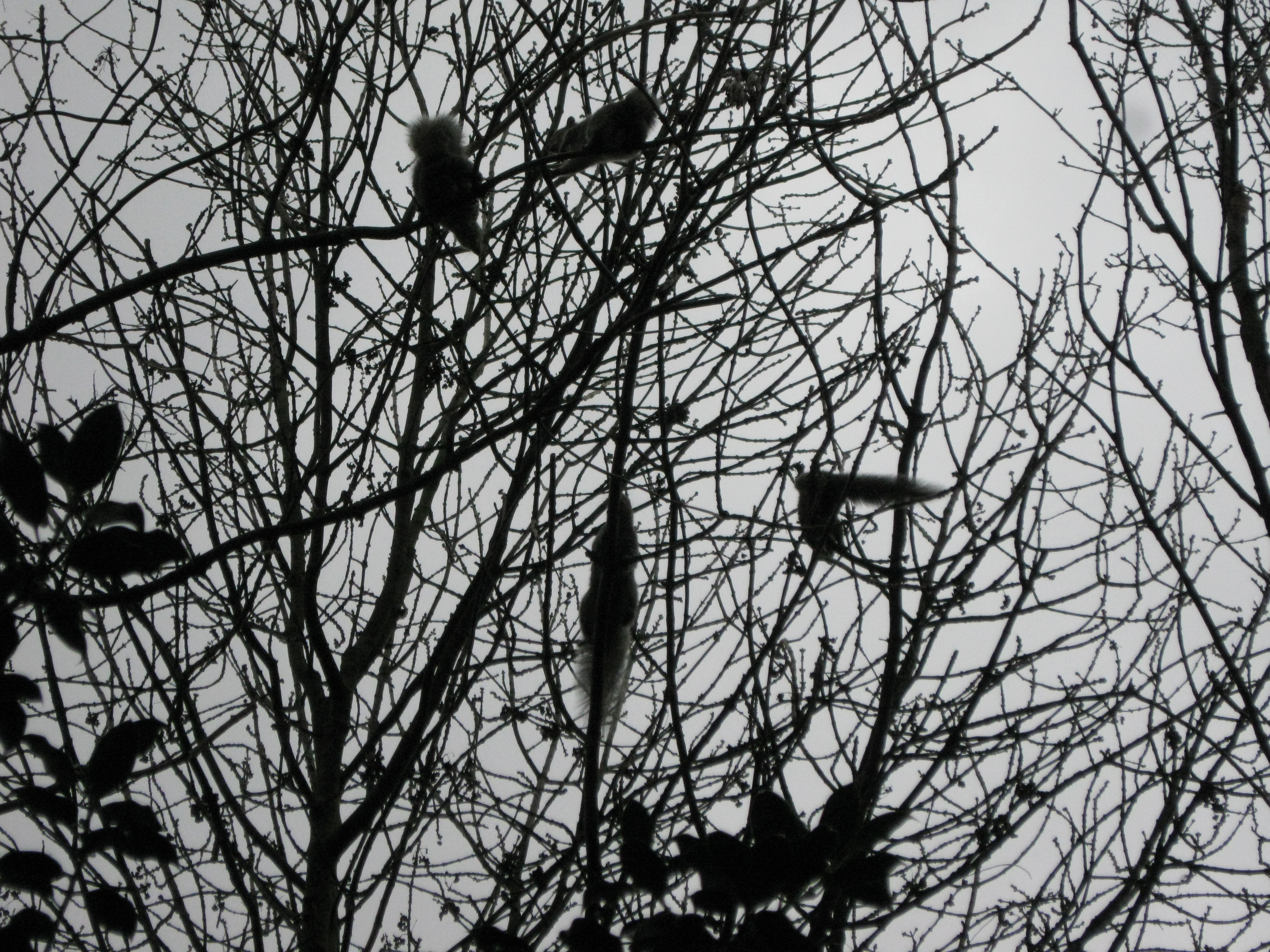
Wildlife in Abney Park Cemetery

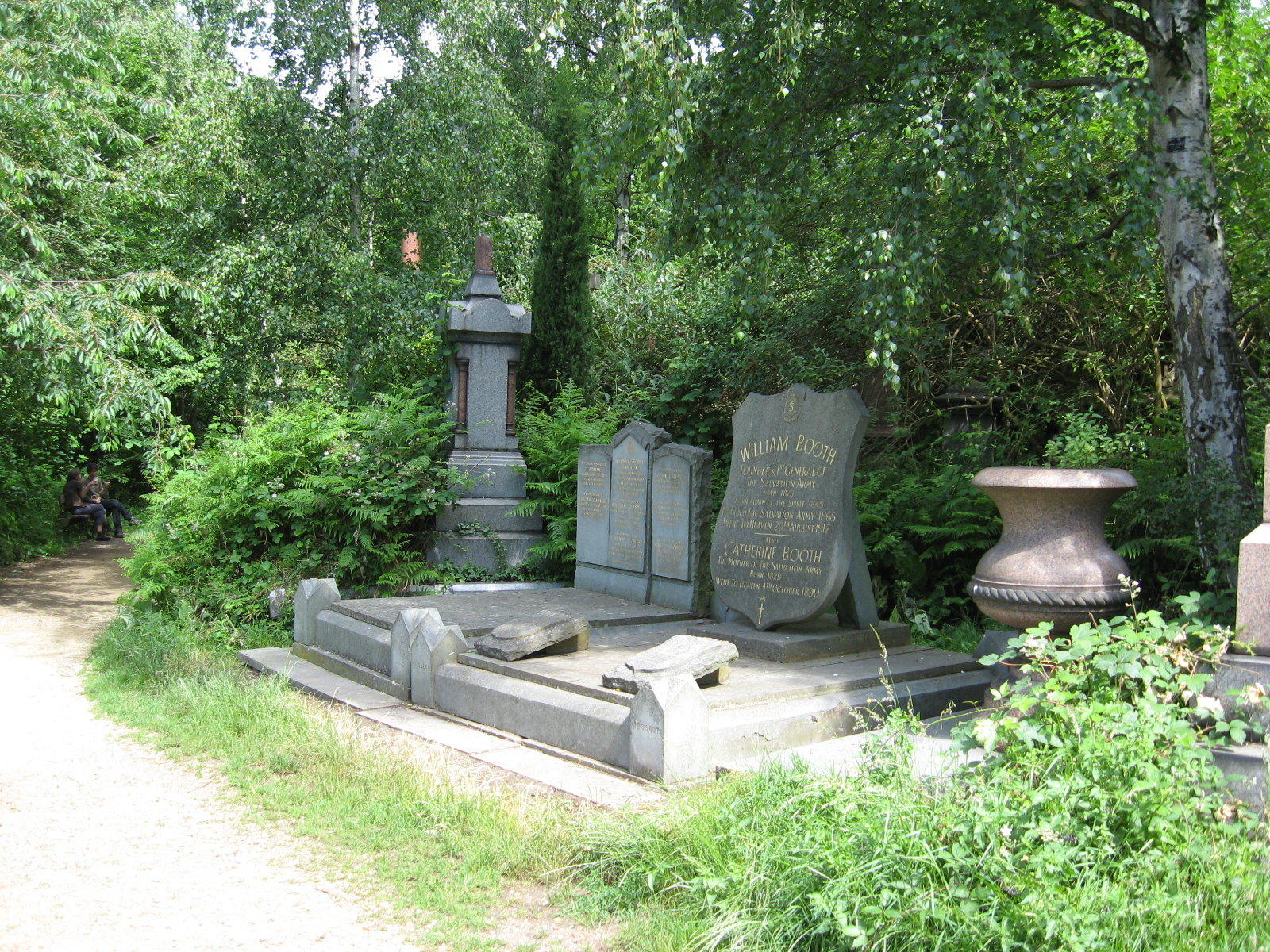
Salvation Army graves

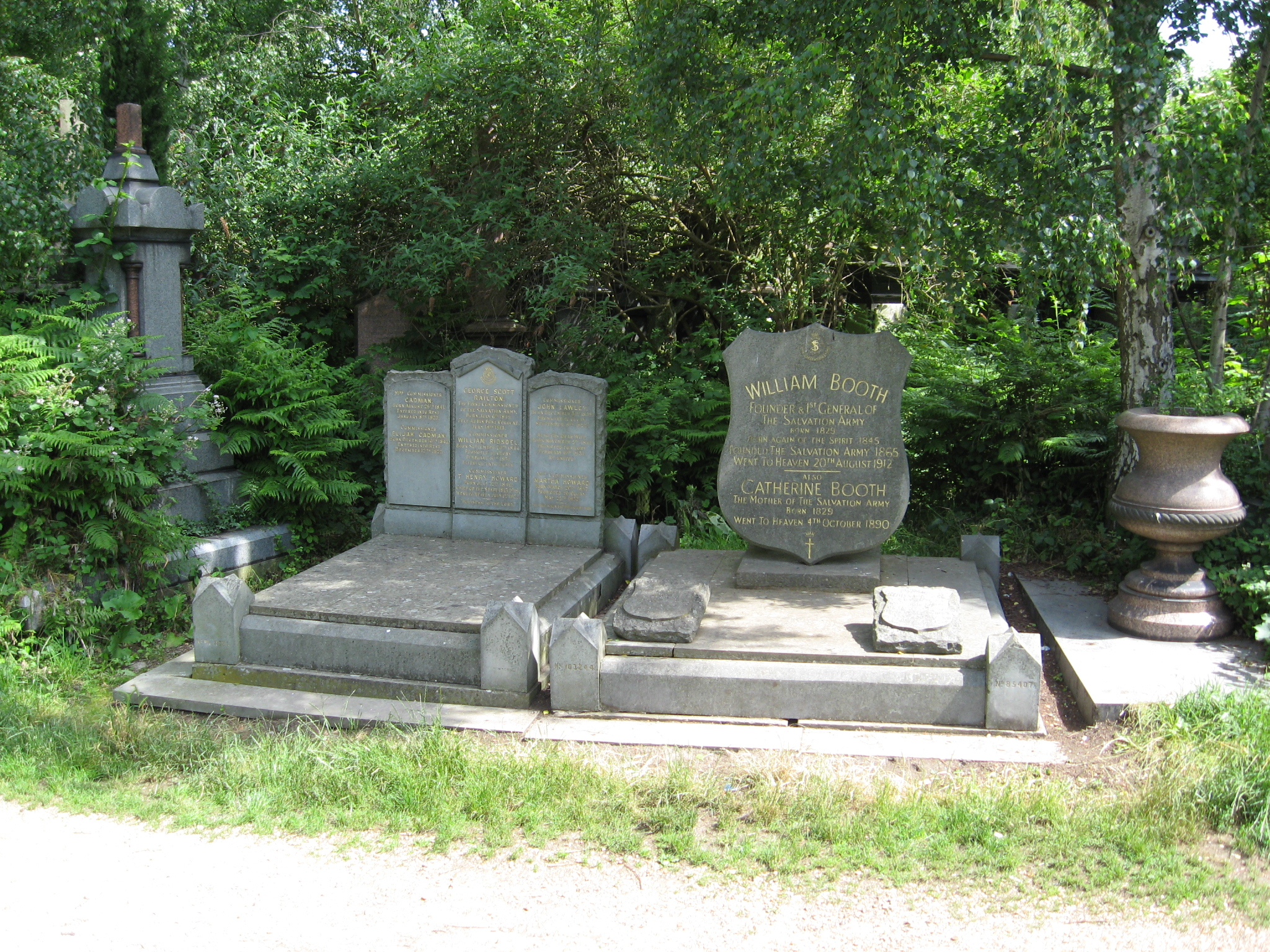
Graves of General William Booth, Catherine Booth and the Commissioners (Grave O06:103244)

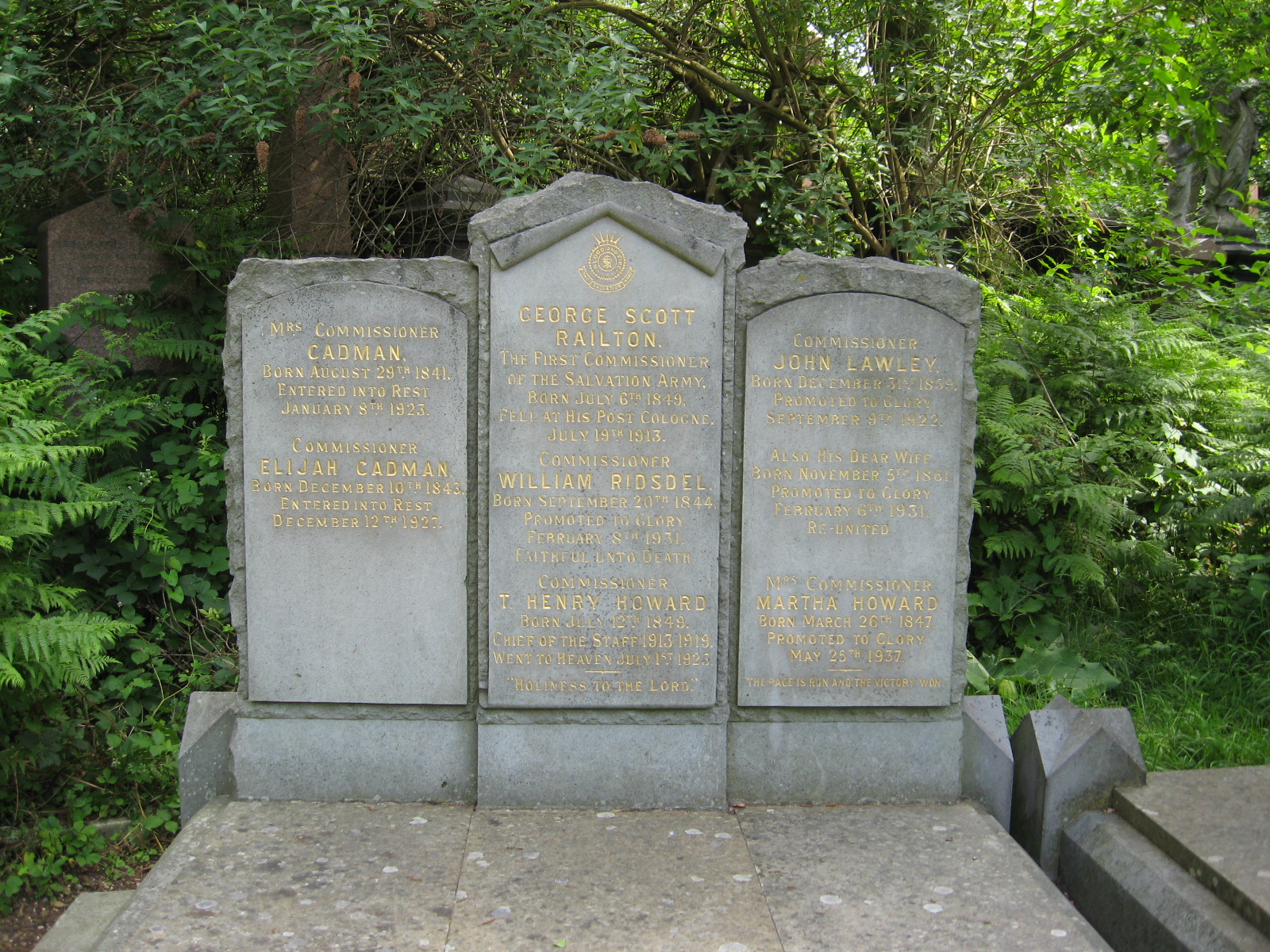
Graves of Salvation Army Commissioners

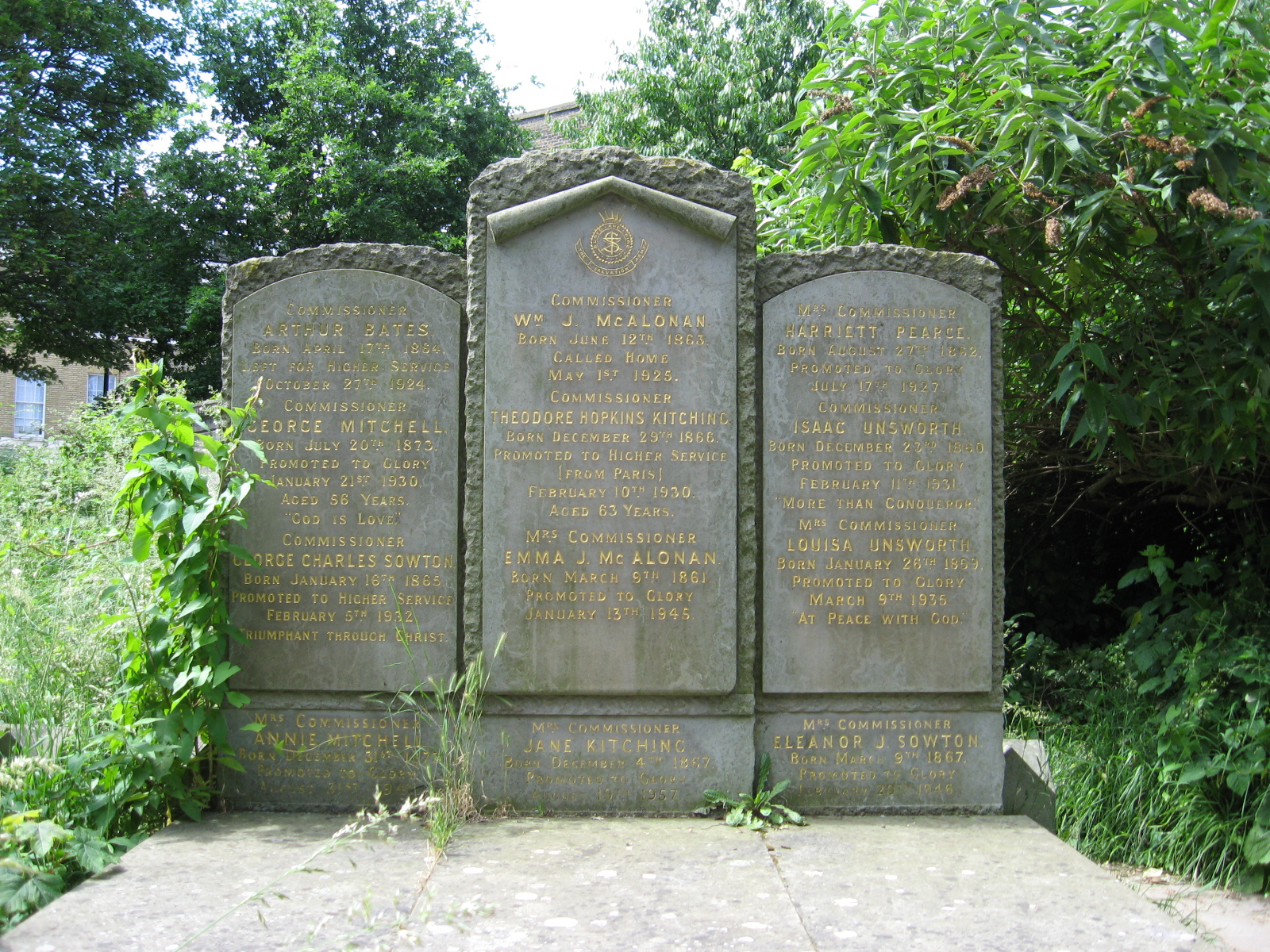
Graves of Salvation Army Commissioners

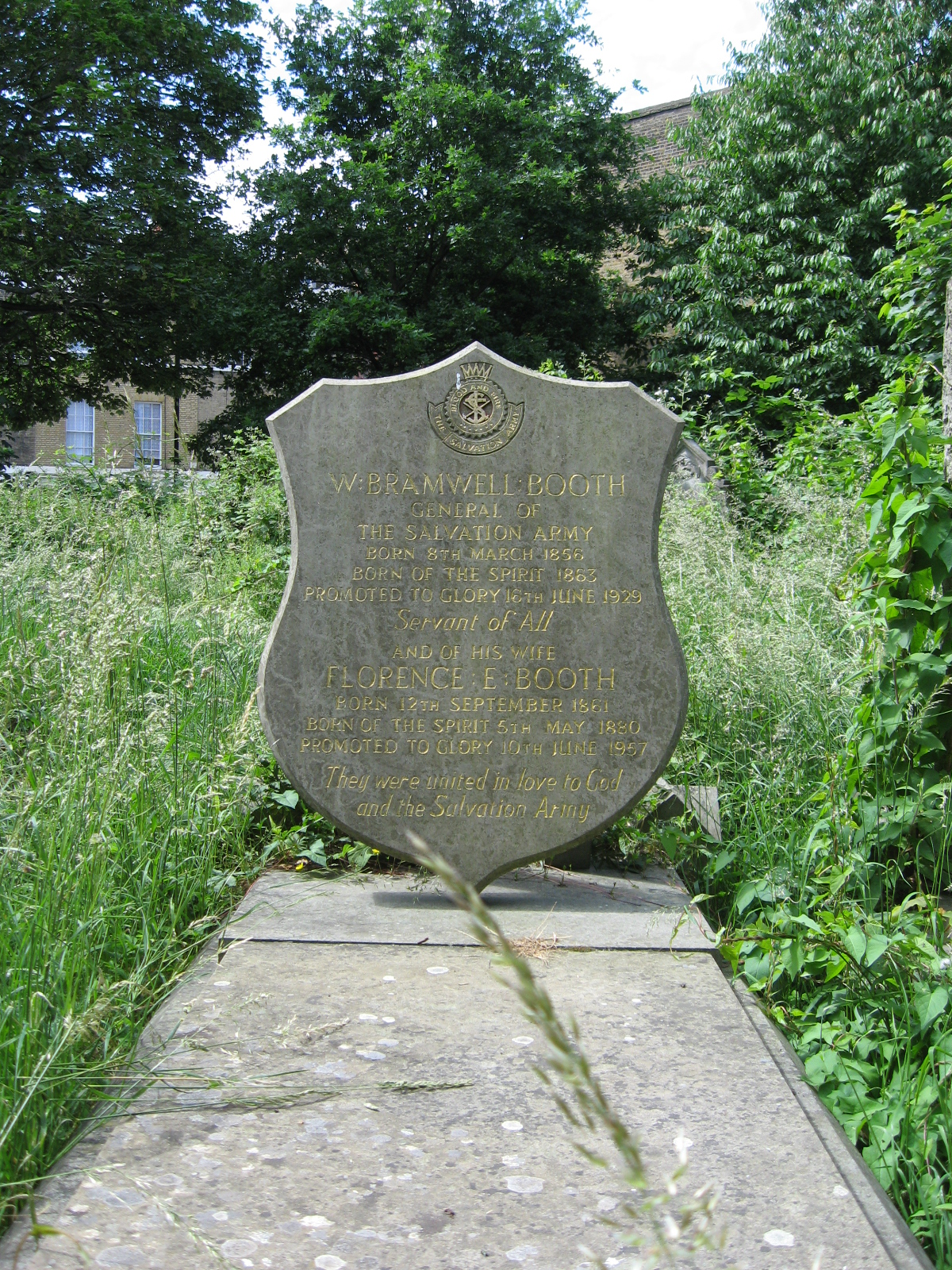
Grave of General Bramwell Booth and Florence Booth (Grave O06:133223)

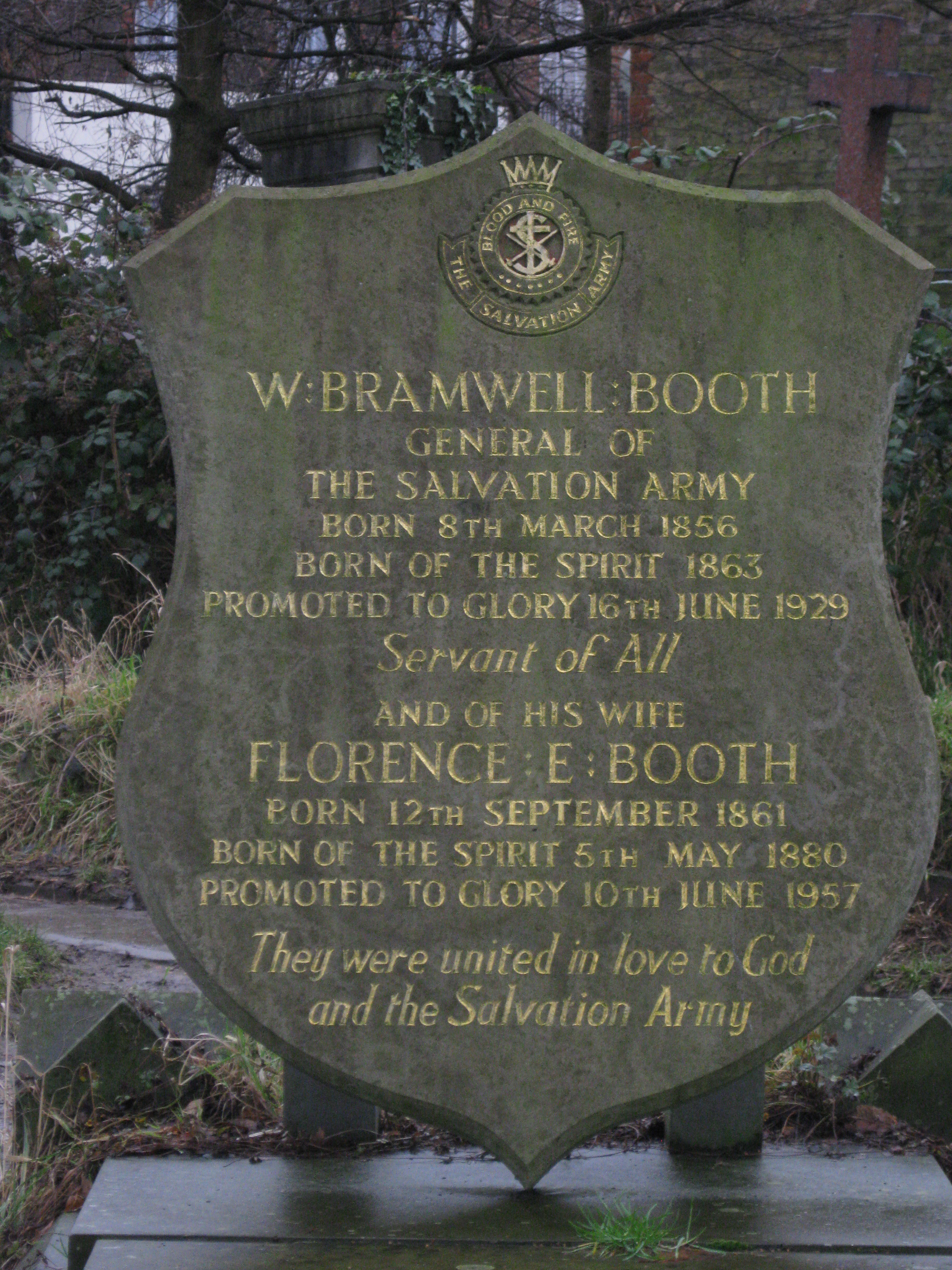
Salvation Army Marker for Bramwell Booth and his wife Florence Booth

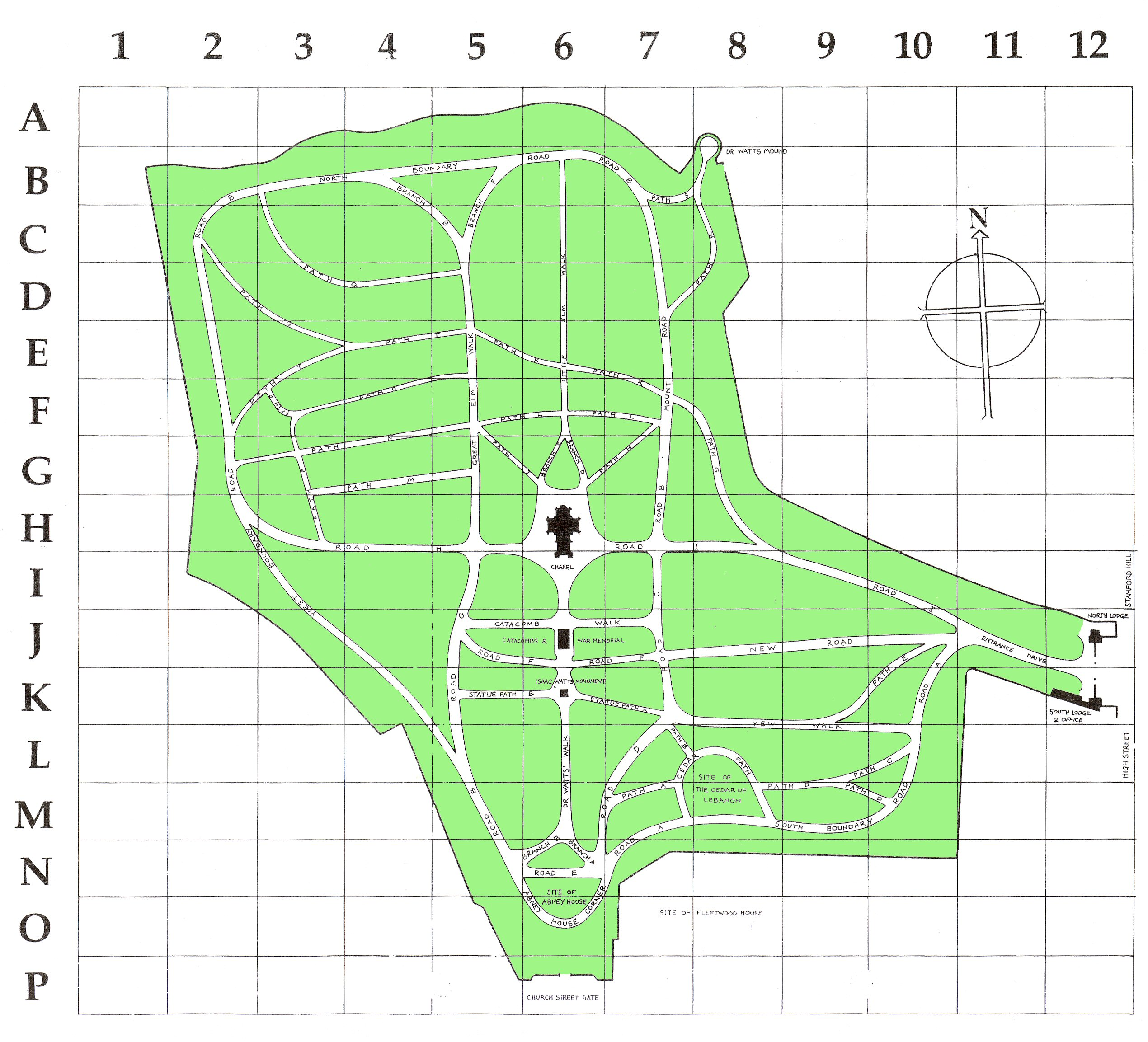
Map of the paths and grave sections within Abney Park

== Media and pop culture ==
- The graveyard scenes in the music video for the song "Back to Black" by singer Amy Winehouse were filmed at Abney Park Cemetery.
- The Steampunk band Abney Park takes its name from the cemetery.
- Abney Park is the setting for a murder in Elizabeth George's book The Body of Death.
- Abney Park is used to depict Highgate Cemetery in Waking The Dead season 2 "Thin Air" episodes.
- The graveyard scenes in the music video for the song "Celestica", by band Crystal Castles, were filmed at Abney Park Cemetery.
- In Michelle Lowe's steampunk novel, Legacy: Volume One, Abney Park Cemetery is the setting where the protagonist, Pierce Landcross, and his older brother Joaquin are separated from their family, the gypsy tribe, as children.
- The entire music video for the cover version of the song "Johnny Remember Me" by Dr. John Cooper Clarke and Hugh Cornwell was filmed at Abney Park Cemetery.
- Reading band Sundara Karma filmed the music video for their single "Explore" at Abney Park Cemetery.

== See also ==
- Abney Park Chapel
- Temple Lodges Abney Park
