= Joseph Ketley =

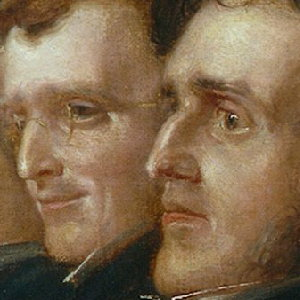
- Ketley (left) with George Thompson at the 1840 Anti-Slavery Conference.
- Born: 1802
- Died: 1875 (aged 72–73)
- Resting place: Abney Park Cemetery
- Occupation: Missionary
- Title: Reverend

The Rev. Joseph Ketley (1802-1875) was a mid-nineteenth century Congregational missionary and abolitionist in Guyana, the former British colony of British Guiana which was known as Demerara and Essequibo at the time when his mission was established. The Dutch colonies of Berbice‚ Demerara and Essequibo were ceded to the British in 1814‚ and incorporated into a single colony in 1831. Guyana became independent in 1966.

In the 1830s and 1840s Joseph Ketley worked towards the abolition of slavery and promoted Christian teaching amongst the African population and the native Indian tribes of the Essequibo River. He was a resident of George Town, Demerara. On 12 July 1840 he attended the Anti-Slavery Convention in London.

In the early nineteenth century, missionary work in Demerara was fiercely opposed by many of the estate owners. They sought to prevent missionaries from advancing the education of slaves and native Indians. Gradually, however the mission schools were established to develop reading and writing skills.

Lacking the support of estate owners, missionaries were often in a dangerous position. The earlier missionary, Rev. John Smith, died in prison under sentence of death whilst being held by the authorities following the famous 1823 slave uprising, which was one of the largest in the colonies (he was pastor of a slave congregation at Le Ressouvener, British Guiana, where he taught education to the African slaves on behalf of the London Missionary Society). Smith became known as the "Demerara Martyr" and his case, and news of the enormous size of the uprising and the brutal loss of African life, caused a great awakening in England, strengthening the abolitionist cause which eventually succeeded in British territories worldwide in 1838.

The Rev. Joseph Ketley is buried at the Congregationalists' non-denominational garden cemetery: Abney Park Cemetery in Stoke Newington, London.
