= So Ben Mi Chi Ha Bon Tempo =

So ben mi chi ha bon tempo or So ben mi, c'ha bon tempo (I know well who is having a good time) is a balletto written by the Italian composer Orazio Vecchi. It appears in the 1590 publication Selva di varia ricreatione, for three to ten voices and is dedicated to Giacomo Seniori and Giovanni Fuccari. These works were written during Vecchi's tenure as canon at the Correggio Cathedral.

Typical of the era, the lyrics are descriptive of the gossipy flirtations between men and women, alluding on multiple levels to intimacies between unnamed protagonists.

So ben mi ch'a bon tempo,
Al so ma basta mo
So ben ch'e favorito,
Ahimé no'l posso dir,
O s'io potessi dire,
Chi va, chi sta, chi vien.
Saluti e baciamani,
Son tutti indarno a fè.

It has an associated dance by Italian dance master Cesare Negri in 1602 from his book Le Gratie d’Amore. In 2003 the song was arranged for guitar and performed by songwriter Richard Thompson on his live album 1000 Years of Popular Music.
