= Has Anybody Here Seen Kelly? =

"Has Anyone Here Seen Kelly?"

Song by Florrie Forde
- Published: 1908
- Composer(s): C.W. Murphy, Will Letters
- Lyricist(s): C.W. Murphy, Will Letters

"Has Anybody Here Seen Kelly?", with music and lyrics by C. W. Murphy and Will Letters (1908), is a British music hall song, originally titled "Kelly From the Isle of Man". The song concerns a Manx woman looking for her boyfriend during a visit to London. It was adapted for American audiences by William McKenna in 1909 for the musical The Jolly Bachelors. Kelly is the most common surname on the Isle of Man.

== History ==
Murphy and Letters originally wrote the song for popular music hall performer Florrie Forde, as a follow-up to another Murphy song written for Forde, "Oh, Oh, Antonio", a success in 1908. Forde regularly performed on the Isle of Man, between England and Ireland, each summer, and "Has Anybody Here Seen Kelly?" made reference to "Kelly from the Isle of Man" as being "as bad as old Antonio". The song was immediately successful, becoming "the rage all over England". In discussing the song, Murphy said: "To find a refrain which will go with a swing is the secret of success in popular song-writing for the general public... It must have a melody in which 'something sticks out', so to speak."

In the American adaptation of the song, lyrics were changed to describe Kelly as being from Ireland and visiting New York City; Irish songs and performers were popular with vaudeville audiences. In Nora Bayes' 1910 recording of the song, she gives a wink to her own Jewish heritage by "accidentally" singing "Has anybody here seen Levi...I mean Kelly."

== Popular culture ==
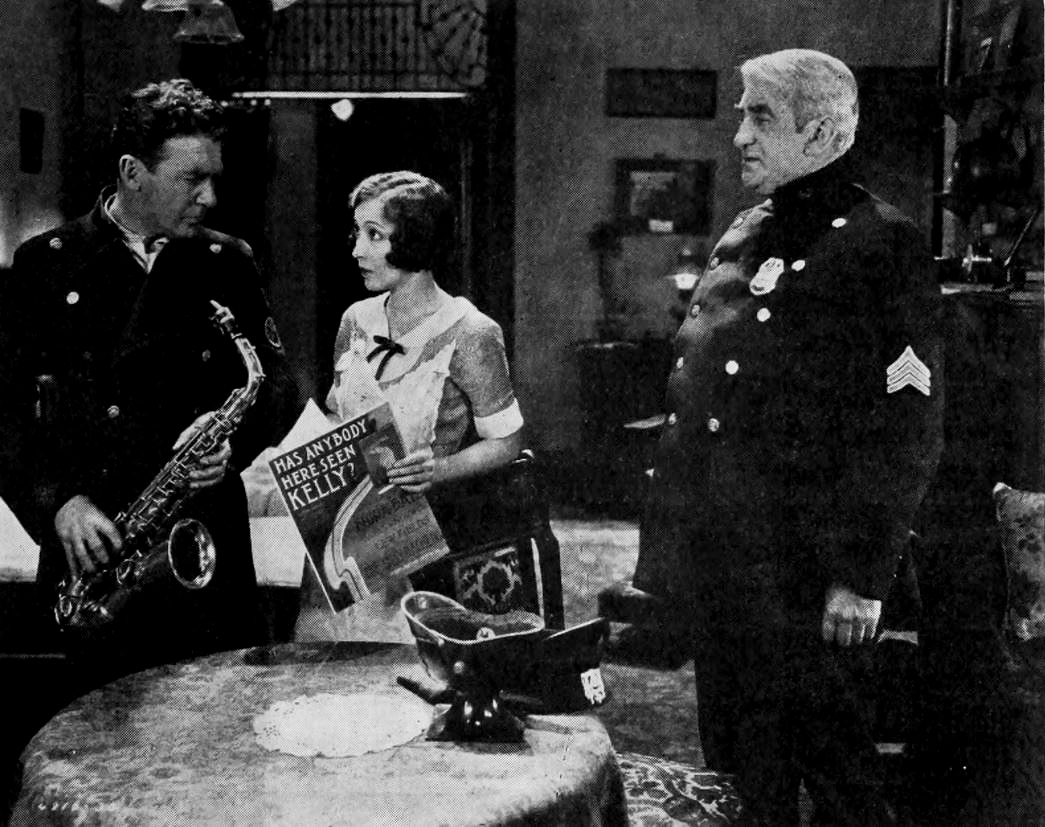
Still from the film Anybody Here Seen Kelly? (1928) with Bessie Love holding sheet music to the song

In 1926, Max Fleischer produced an animated short based on the song in the DeForest Phonofilm sound-on-film process as part of his "Song Car-Tunes" series. In 1928, William Wyler directed a Universal Pictures silent starring Bessie Love titled Anybody Here Seen Kelly? that refers to the song. In 1943, the song was performed without being credited in the film musical Hello, Frisco, Hello. An instrumental rendition of the song can be heard throughout the 1949 film It Happens Every Spring where it functions like a theme song for the main character, a science professor who becomes a baseball star under the pseudonym 'King Kelly'. In the 1956 Adelphi Films musical film Stars In Your Eyes, Pat Kirkwood sings the song. In 1978's television biopic Ziegfeld: The Man and His Women, Inga Swenson, as Nora Bayes, sings the song during the scene of the first Ziegfeld Follies in 1908.

In 1917, the British composer Havergal Brian based much of the opening scene of his burlesque opera The Tigers around the song (or rather round the refrain), which runs beneath and through the action as policeman search for a missing person during a Bank Holiday carnival on Hampstead Heath. A few years later he extracted the music, without the vocal parts or transferring those parts to instruments, as an independent orchestral work, Symphonic Variations on 'Has Anybody Here Seen Kelly?'.

== Lyrics ==
Kelly and his sweetheart wore a very pleasant smile,
And sent upon a holiday they went from Mona's Isle,
They landed safe in London but alas it's sad to say,
For Kelly lost his little girl up Piccadilly way.
She searched for him in vain and then of course began to fret,
And this is the appeal she made to everyone she met:

Has anybody here seen Kelly?
K-E-double-L-Y.
Has anybody here seen Kelly?
Find him if you can!
He's as bad as old Antonio,
Left me on my own-ee-o,
Has anybody here seen Kelly?
Kelly from the Isle of Man!

When it started raining she exclaimed, "What shall I do?"
For Kelly had her ticket and her spending money too,
She wandered over London like a hound upon the scent,
At last she found herself outside the Houses of Parliament.
She got among the suffragettes who chained her to the grille,
And soon they heard her shouting in a voice both loud and shrill:

Has anybody here seen Kelly?
K-E-double-L-Y.
Has anybody here seen Kelly?
Find him if you can!
He's as bad as old Antonio,
Left me on my own-ee-o,
Has anybody here seen Kelly?
Kelly from the Isle of Man!

== In other media ==
A verse from an adaptation of the song was featured in the film Catch Me If You Can on a broadcast of the 1960s television program Sing Along With Mitch. The song was also referenced in a 1959 episode of the television series Bachelor Father titled "Bentley, the Hero". The theme tune to Kelly Monteith's BBC television series also used part of the song's music.

The song appears in the 2018 film The Ballad of Buster Scruggs directed by the Coen Brothers. The film is a six-part episodic Western with the song featuring in the sixth and final segment, "The Mortal Remains". The song was performed by Jonjo O'Neill with the song's title character's name being changed from 'Kelly' to 'Molly'.
