= Morny Cash =

English music hall comedian

Morny Cash (born Peter Dalton; 21 May 1872 – 16 October 1938) was an English music hall comedian.

He was born in Manchester, and at first worked as an engineer, making amateur appearances as one half of a comic double act. He was spotted by an agent in the 1890s, and after a successful engagement in Blackpool became popular around Manchester and elsewhere in the north west of England. After a series of shows in Liverpool he was booked to tour the south of England, where he was billed as "The Lancashire Lad". His most popular songs included "All of a Do-Da", "Beautiful Beautiful Bed", "Married a Year Today", and "I Live in Trafalgar Square" ("...with four lions to guard me.."), the latter written by C. W. Murphy and first performed in 1902.

He became one of the most popular northern dialect comedians, and made recordings of some of his routines, as well as appearing in the 1904 silent film comedy, The Eviction. He died in London in 1938 at the age of 66.
