= Walter Laburnum =

English music hall performer

- Born: George Walter Davis; 15 June 1847; Hendon, Middlesex, England
- Died: 28 March 1902 (aged 54); London, England
- Occupation: Comic entertainer
- Years active: 1870s–c.1900

Walter Laburnum (born George Walter Davis; 15 June 1847 – 28 March 1902) was an English music hall performer.

== Biography ==
Born in Hendon, Laburnum worked as a beer and wine seller before becoming a professional performer in the 1870s. He became well known as a singer of "coster songs", and for parodying the style of popular lions comiques, in particular George Leybourne, with songs such as "Fashionable Fred". Leybourne was known for driving around the capital in a carriage drawn by four white ponies; Laburnum used a cart drawn by four donkeys. Laburnum also sang "Dr. De Jongh's Cod Liver Oil", mocking the use of fashionable new medical remedies. He was known as "The Star of the East", a reference to the East End of London.

Also billed as "The Royal Comic", Laburnum toured with his concert party in later years. He died in London in 1902, aged 54, and was buried at Abney Park Cemetery.
