= Speak, my Heart! =

"Speak, my Heart" is a poem by Arthur Christopher Benson, set to music by the English composer Edward Elgar in 1902.

The score was dated 16 August 1902 and it was published by Boosey & Co. in 1903 or 1904,. The first performance was possibly on 26 August 1902.

== Lyrics ==
Sweet Maiden, bright Maiden,

Passing on your way,

May I linger with you ?

Maiden, say !

“ I have much to see,

And far, far to go.

Let it be another day,

Now it is No ! ”

One word of welcome

Ere you depart !

I will be patient still;

Silence, my heart !

Sweet Maiden, shy Maiden,

Passing far away,

May I wander with you ?

Maiden, say !

” You are nought to me,

And I nought to you !

What am I to answer now ?

What can I do ? “

Wander alone then,

I will depart;--

Yet she smiles upon me,

Courage, my heart !

True Maiden, dear Maiden,

Passing my door,

I will say a new word,

Whispered before.

” You may whisper softly,

Soft and still,

Yes, I will hear you out,

Say whate’er you will ! ”

Hear me and heed me,

Ere you depart;

Yes, her lips are smiling;--

Speak, my heart !

== Recordings ==
"The Unknown Elgar" includes "Speak, my Heart" performed by Teresa Cahill (soprano), with Barry Collett (piano).
