= Dream Children (Elgar) =

1902 musical work for small orchestra by Edward Elgar

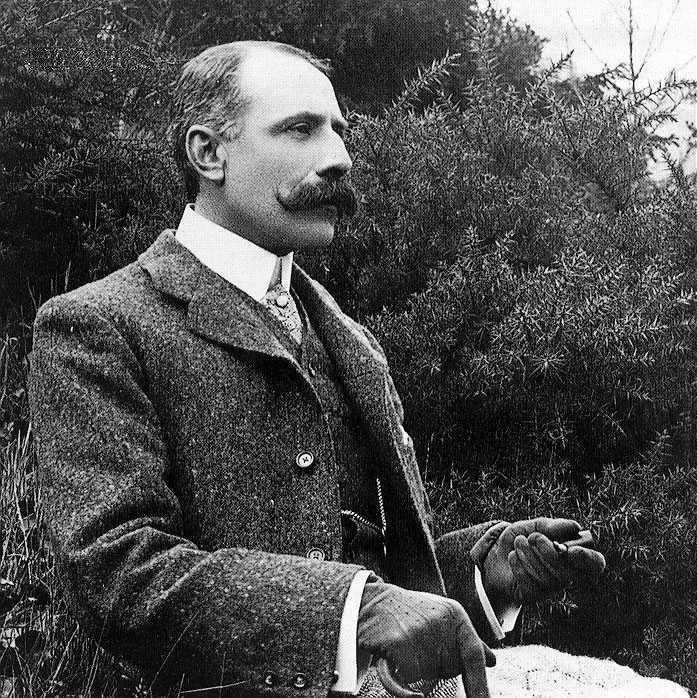
Edward Elgar, c. 1900

Dream Children, Op 43 is a musical work for small orchestra by Edward Elgar. There are two movements:

1. Andante in G minor
2. Allegretto piacevole in G major

== History ==
These two pieces were written in 1902, when Elgar was approaching the peak of his fame and popularity. Unusually for Elgar they were not written to any commission. Michael Kennedy suggests that they may have been retrieved from the unused material for a symphony celebrating General Gordon which Elgar had been working on since 1898. They are not complete symphonic movements (the first movement takes a little over three minutes to perform and the second a little over four minutes) but it was Elgar's practice to work in small sections and then put them together into a whole.

Ernest Newman described Dream Children as "a couple of delicate little pastels for a small orchestra, inspired by an essay of Charles Lamb. Elia (sc. Lamb), entertaining some children with stories of their grandmother, finds them gradually disappear from his sight he is, indeed, only dreaming":

And while I stood gazing, both the children gradually grew fainter to my view, receding, and still receding, till nothing at last but two mournful features were seen in the uttermost distance, which, without speech, strangely impressed upon me the effects of speech: "We are not of Alice, nor of thee, nor are we children at all. We are nothing; less than nothing, and dreams. We are only what might have been."

Newman continues, "The two pieces are very short – 24 and 141 bars respectively. The first, a tender little reverie with much lovely feeling underlying its simplicity, is the better of the two. The second, though charming, is more obvious in its sentiment. At the end of it there is a return to the theme of the first".

The orchestral score and parts were originally published by Joseph Williams Ltd (London) in 1902, and then in 1911 by Schott & Co with the title Enfants d'un Rêve and the translation below this "(Dream-Children)". As with his earlier piece Salut d'Amour, Elgar agreed with the same publisher that the French title would sell better.

The first performance was at the Queen's Hall on 4 September 1902, conducted by Arthur W Payne.

== Instrumentation ==
2 flutes, 2 oboes, 2 clarinets in B♭ and A, 2 bassoons, 4 horns in F, 3 timpani, harp and strings.

== Sources ==
- Kennedy, Michael (1987). Portrait of Elgar (Third ed.). Oxford: Oxford University Press. ISBN 0-19-816365-7.
- Newman, Ernest (1922). Elgar. The Music of the Masters. London: John Lane: The Bodley Head. OCLC 115635722.
