= I Live in Trafalgar Square =

British song

Song
- Language: English
- Published: 1902
- Genre: Music Hall
- Songwriter: C. W. Murphy

"I Live in Trafalgar Square" is popular British music hall song of the early 20th century, written by C. W. Murphy.

== History and description ==
The song was written by C. W. Murphy, published in 1902 and originally sung by Morny Cash. It has since been performed and recorded by a number of other singers, including notably Stanley Holloway in the late 1950s. The song features in Robert Tressell's 1914 semi-autobiographical novel The Ragged Trousered Philanthropists.

The song is from the perspective of a vagrant who stays in Trafalgar Square, lauding the square as a grand place to live; the singer describes his sleeping arrangements with a comedic "inverted snobbery". Its references to poverty and vagrancy were a common theme of music hall songs of the period aimed at working class audiences, which often made humour of the hardships faced by people of working class.

== See also ==
- Don't Dilly Dally on the Way
- Burlington Bertie
