= C. W. Murphy =

British composer (1870–1913)

- Born: William Murphy; 14 February 1870; Manchester, England
- Died: 18 June 1913 (aged 43); Blackpool, Lancashire, England
- Other name: Charles William Murphy
- Occupation: Songwriter
- Years active: 1890s–1913

Charles William Murphy (14 February 1870 – 18 June 1913) was a prolific British composer of music hall and musical theatre tunes.

== Biography ==
How can they tell that I'm Irish?
1910 Edison Records recording of vaudeville performer Edward M. Favor's rendition of C. W. Murphy's song How can they tell that I'm Irish?

He was born William Murphy in Manchester, England. He started writing songs in the 1890s, including "Dancing to the Organ in the Mile End Road" (1893). Another song, "Little Yellow-bird" (1903) (aka "Goodbye, Little Yellow Bird") written with lyricist William Hargreave, was first performed by Ellaline Terriss. It can be seen performed by Scottish comedian Charlie Naughton in the 1938 film Alf's Button Afloat and by Angela Lansbury in the 1945 film The Picture of Dorian Gray and again by Lansbury in the 1985 episode "Sing a Song of Murder" from her TV series Murder, She Wrote. With frequent collaborator Dan Lipton (1873–1935) Murphy also wrote both "She's a Lassie from Lancashire" (1907) and "My Girl's a Yorkshire Girl" (1908), the latter mentioned by James Joyce in his novel Ulysses and also turned into a 1909 short sound film of the same name.

Murphy is perhaps best known for the song "Has Anybody Here Seen Kelly?" with lyric by Will Letters, published in 1909. The song was written for Florrie Forde, and was a follow-up to another Murphy song written for Forde, "Oh, Oh, Antonio", a success the previous year. Forde regularly performed in the Isle of Man each summer, and "Has Anybody Here Seen Kelly?" made reference to "Kelly from the Isle of Man" as being "as bad as old Antonio". The song was immediately successful, becoming "the rage all over England". In discussing the song, Murphy said: "To find a refrain which will go with a swing is the secret of success in popular song-writing for the general public... It must have a melody in which 'something sticks out', so to speak." The song reached the United States, where the lyrics were partly rewritten by William McKenna to set it in New York; it became a hit for Nora Bayes. In 1926, "Has Anybody Here Seen Kelly?" was made into an animated short of the same title directed by Dave Fleischer, and in 1928 into a feature film directed by William Wyler. The song was also performed in the 1943 film Hello Frisco, Hello. Murphy and Letters wrote further songs for Forde including "Flanagan" (1910) with the refrain "Flanagan, Flanagan, take me to the Isle of Man again", alluding to Forde's real surname of Flanagan.

Murphy also wrote several songs for Billy Williams, including "Put Me Amongst the Girls" (with Dan Lipton, 1908), as well as continuing to write for Florrie Forde songs including "Hold Your Hand Out, Naughty Boy" (with Worton David, 1913).

Murphy died in the night of 18/19 June 1913 in Blackpool, Lancashire, England, at the age of 43. His name is sometimes given as Clarence Wainwright Murphy, apparently in error. Peter Gammond wrote that "the life of Murphy is shrouded in silence, but the catchy songs he wrote have not perished".

== Works ==
- Sole credit
  - "Clara & Sarah" – 1897
  - "Baby Loo (How Can I Be Poor)" – 1898
  - "Hooligan's Canary" – 1898
  - "How Can I Be Poor?" – 1898
  - "How Can They Tell That Oi'm Oirish?" – 1898
  - "Kelly, the Car-man" – 1898
  - "Jane Magee" – 1898
  - "Everybody Loves You" – 1900
  - "Just the Same To-day" – 1900
  - "Mulligan's Motor-car" – 1900
  - "Just As Long As You Love Me" – 1901
  - "Dat Little Gal of Johnson's" – 1902
  - "I Did Feel Sorry" – 1902
  - "I Don't Want To Be A Honeysuckle" – 1902
  - "I Live in Trafalgar Square" – 1902
  - "If That Comes True" – 1902
  - "Mama's Little Sleepy-eyes!" – 1902
  - "Molly O'Malley" – 1902
  - "My Home is My Garden" – 1902
  - "The Coloured Millionaire" – 1902
  - "The Girl in the Panama" – 1902
  - "Hanging Mother's Picture on a Nail" – 1903
  - "The Giddy Little Isle of Man" – 1903
  - "Good-night, Little Girl" – 1904
  - "The Little Irish Postman" – 1904
  - "You Wish You Were A Girl" – 1904
  - "Welcome Home, Sailor Boy!" – 1905
  - "Betty, I'm Pining" – 1906
  - "Little Cloud with the Silv'ry Lining" – 1907
  - "My Chateau in Barcelona" – 1907
  - "The House, the Flat and the Bungalow" – 1907
  - "Alphonso, My Alphonso" – 1909
  - "Mum-mum-mum-Mary" – 1909
  - "Boss of the House" – 1910
  - "In Your Old Tam-O'-Shanter" – 1910
  - "The Kelly" – 1910
  - "O'Brien" – 1911
  - "Hogmanay" – 1912
  - "You Must Come Round on Saturday" – 1912
  - "We Must Have a Song about the Isle of Man" – 1912
- with Andrew N. Allen
  - "Let's All Go into the Ballroom" – 1912
- with Walt Alwyn
  - "Kicking Up a Row Like That" – 1900
- with George Arthurs
  - "Making Up the Quarrel" – 1904
  - "Bashful!" – 1906
  - "Costumes, Gowns & Frocks" – 1907
  - "Fire! Fire! Fire!" – 1907
  - "Firelight" – 1907
  - "Get It Over!" – 1907
  - "Put Me Amongst the Girls" – 1907
  - "Don't Be Ridiculous, Nicholas!" – 1908
  - "I Could Get Along So Nicely With You" – 1908
  - "I'm Not Looking for a Beautiful Girl" – 1908
  - "I've Been Fishing for Pearls" – 1908
- with Edgar Bateman
  - "Mrs. Carter" – 1900
  - "The Garden Filled With Gold" – 1904
  - "Dear Little Shadow" – 1905
  - "It's Our Silver Wedding" – 1907
- with Harry Castling
  - "Let's All Go Down the Strand" – 1904
  - "Good-Night, Number One!" – 1905
  - "Hello, Little Girl! Who Are You?" – 1905
  - "It's the Best World We've Ever Seen" – 1905
  - "Little Glow-worm!" – 1905
  - "Bangalore" – 1906
  - "Barbados" – 1906
  - "Farewell, New York!" – 1906
  - "If Your Hair Were Not So Curly" – 1906
  - "Rowing To Hampton Court" – 1907
  - "I Would Still Love You" – 1908
  - "Meet Me, Jenny, When the Sun Goes Down" – 1908
  - "Pull Yourselves Together, Girls" – 1909
  - "The Girl in the Clogs and Shawl" – 1909 (cited in E. M. Forster's novel, A Passage to India)
  - "The Singer Was Irish" – 1910
  - "Have a Banana!" – 1910
  - "I'm the Man That Buried Flanagan" – 1911
  - "We All Go the Same Way Home" – 1911
- with Charles Collins
  - "Come and Hear Him Play His Oom-Tera-Ra" – 1909
  - "On the Same Place Every Time" – 1910
- with Worton David
  - "Have You Heard John James O'Hara?" – 1911
  - "Follow The Footsteps in the Snow" – 1912
  - "They're All Single by the Seaside" – 1911
  - "Hold Your Hand Out You Naughty Boy" – 1914
  - "Keep Your Head Down, Fritzi Boy (We Saw You)" – 1918
- with Charles Deane
  - "All Have A Dinner With Me" – 1893
- with W. Farrell
  - "Irish As She's Spoken" – 1893
- with Albert Hall
  - "Still His Whiskers Grew" – ?
  - "Maggie Marney" – 1894
  - "Oh Where is My Wandering Boy To-Night?" – 1894
  - "A Glorious Sprig of Shamrock for Your Coat" – 1900
  - "The Baby's Name" – 1900
  - "My Blind Norah" – 1901
- with W. Hargreaves
  - "Little Yellow-bird" – 1903
- with Fred W. Leigh
  - "Dominic McCue" – 1906
  - "Goo-Goo Land" – 1908
- with Will Letters
  - "Has Anybody Here Seen Kelly?" – 1908
  - "The Kelly Two-Step" – 1909
  - "Flanagan" – 1910
  - "Hi, Hi, Hi, Mr. McKie" – 1911
- with Dan Lipton
  - "Don't Tell the World Your Troubles" – ?
  - "If I Had A Girl As Nice As You" – ?
  - "Run, Run, You Little Ones (Sweep! Sweep! Sweep!)" - 1904
  - "The Ugly Duckling" – 1904
  - "Go Away Mr. Crocodile" – 1904
  - "Bombombay" – 1905
  - "Ain't Yer Gwin Ter Say 'How Do?'" – 1906
  - "As I Stand by the Old Church Door" – 1906
  - "It is the Scarecrow" – 1906
  - "Put Me Amongst The Girls" – 1907
  - "My Girl's A Yorkshire Girl" – 1908
  - "Oh, Oh Antonio" – 1908
  - "Take Me Back to the Isle of Man!" – 1908
  - "I Only Got Married To-Day" – 1909
  - "I'll Be Cross, Arabella" – 1909
  - "Plink Plonk, Or: The Skin of a Spanish Onion" – 1909
  - "We Don't Want More Daylight" – 1909
  - "I Shall Sulk" – 1910
  - "Shirts" – 1910
  - "The First Time That I've Been in Love" – 1910
  - "We'll Treat You like One of Our Own" – 1910
  - "No Wonder I Look Jolly" – 1911
  - "You Must All Do as I Do" – 1912
  - "Beautiful, Beautiful Bed" – 1915
  - "Bed, Wonderful Bed" – 1915
- with Dan Lipton and Magini
  - "I Wonder What It Feels Like To Be Poor" – 1920
- with Dan Lipton and John Neat
  - "She's A Lassie from Lancashire" – 1907
- with Dan Lipton and Hugh Owen
  - "I've a Garden in Sweden" – 1907
  - "If You Were The Only Girl on Earth" – 1908
- with Hugh Owen
  - "Don't Throw Stones at Other People's Windows" – 1907
- with George A. Stephens
  - "I'm the Best Pal I've Ever Had!" – 1908
- with R.P. Weston and F.J. Barnes
  - "I Don't Like Your Stovepipe Hat" – 1907
