= British and Dominions Film Corporation =

British and Dominions Film Corporation was a short-lived British film production company located at Imperial Place, Elstree Way, Borehamwood, Hertfordshire. The studio had its home base at British and Dominions Imperial Studios then relocated to Pinewood Studios.

The company was dominated by the producer and director Herbert Wilcox. The company gained a contract to make quota films for release by the British subsidiary of Paramount Pictures.

The company was formed in the 1920s between Herbert Wilcox and Nelson Keys.

The company struggled to distribute films in Europe. In August 1933 it was called "easily the most active of British productionists at the moment."

In December 1939 the company reported a loss of £8,000.

== Films ==
=== 1920s ===
Title	Release date	Director	Notes
Dawn	March 1928	Herbert Wilcox	Shot at Cricklewood Studios
The Triumph of the Scarlet Pimpernel	November 1928	T. Hayes Hunter	Shot at Cricklewood Studios
The Bondman	January 1929	Herbert Wilcox	Shot at Cricklewood Studios
A Peep Behind the Scenes	January 1929	Jack Raymond	Shot at Cricklewood Studios
When Knights Were Bold	February 1929	Tim Whelan	Shot at Cricklewood Studios
Black Waters	April 1929	Marshall Neilan	Shot in Hollywood in sound
The Woman in White	May 1929	Herbert Wilcox	Shot at Cricklewood Studios
Splinters	December 1929	Jack Raymond	Shot at Blattner Studios and Imperial Studios

=== 1930s ===
Title	Release date	Director	Notes
Rookery Nook	February 1930	Tom Walls	Shot at Blattner Studios and Imperial Studios
The Loves of Robert Burns	March 1930	Hebert Wilcox	
Wolves	May 1930	Albert de Courville	Shot at Blattner Studios
Warned Off	July 1930	Walter West	Shot at Cricklewood Studios
On Approval	August 1930	Tom Walls	
Canaries Sometimes Sing	1930	Tom Walls	
Plunder	November 1930	Tom Walls	
Tons of Money	December 1930	Tom Walls	
The Speckled Band	March 1931	Jack Raymond	
The Chance of a Night Time	May 1931	Herbert Wilcox	
Almost a Divorce	August 1931	Jack Raymond	
Carnival	October 1931	Herbert Wilcox	
Mischief	December 1931	Jack Raymond	
Up for the Cup	1931	Jack Raymond	
The Blue Danube	January 1932	Herbert Wilcox	
A Night Like This	March 1932	Tom Walls	
Aren't We All?	March 1932	Harry Lachman	
Life Goes On	March 1932	Jack Raymond	
Goodnight, Vienna	March 1932	Herbert Wilcox	
The Mayor's Nest	June 1932	Maclean Rogers	
Thark	July 1932	Tom Walls	
The Love Contract	July 1932	Herbert Selpin	Co-production
Money Means Nothing	September 1932	Herbert Wilcox	
Leap Year	October 1932	Tom Walls	
The Flag Lieutenant	October 1932	Henry Edwards	
The Barton Mystery	November 1932	Henry Edwards	
Say It with Music	November 1932	Jack Raymond	
Night of the Garter	1933	Jack Raymond	
Up to the Neck	1933	Jack Raymond	
Up for the Derby	1933	Maclean Rogers	
The King's Cup	January 1933	Herbert Wilcox	
Mixed Doubles	1933	Sidney Morgan	
Just My Luck	1933	Jack Raymond	
It's a King	1933	Jack Raymond	
General John Regan	1933	Jack Raymond	
Discord	January 1933	Henry Edwards	
Ask Beccles	1933	Redd Davis	
The Little Damozel	February 1933	Herbert Wilcox	
One Precious Year	February 1933	Henry Edwards	
The Crime at Blossoms	March 1933	Maclean Rogers	
The Blarney Stone	March 1933	Tom Walls	
Bitter Sweet	March 1933	Herbert Wilcox	
Yes, Mr Brown	May 1933	Jack Buchanan, Herbert Wilcox	
Lord of the Manor	May 1933	Henry Edwards	Shot at British International Pictures Studios
Anne One Hundred	June 1933	Henry Edwards	
Summer Lightning	June 1933	Maclean Rogers	
Purse Strings	July 1933	Henry Edwards	
That's a Good Girl	September 1933	Jack Buchanan	
Trouble	November 1933	Maclean Rogers	
Chelsea Life	November 1933	Sidney Morgan	
Sorrell and Son	December 1933	Jack Raymond	
The King of Paris	1934	Jack Raymond	
Lilies of the Field	1934	Norman Walker	
Faces	January 1934	Sidney Morgan	
The Queen's Affair	February 1934	Hebert Wilcox	
Seeing Is Believing	February 1934	Redd Davis	
Lucky Loser	March 1934	Reginald Denham	
It's a Cop	March 1934	Redd Davis	
Dangerous Ground	May 1934	Norman Walker	
Brides to Be	May 1934	Reginald Denham	
The Girl in the Flat	June 1934	Redd Davis	
To Be a Lady	July 1934	George King	
Girls, Please!	July 1934	Jack Raymond	
Nell Gwynn	August 1934	Herbert Wilcox	
Get Your Man	August 1934	George King	
Easy Money	August 1934	Redd Davis	
Badger's Green	September 1934	Adrian Brunel	
The Scoop	October 1934	Maclean Rogers	
The Case for the Crown	November 1934	George A. Cooper	
The Way of Youth	November 1934	Norman Walker	
The Primrose Path	1934	Reginald Denham	
Gentlemen's Agreement	1935	George Pearson	
Brewster's Millions	January 1935	Thornton Freeland	
The Price of Wisdom	February 1935	Reginald Denham	
Key to Harmony	March 1935	Norman Walker	
Escape Me Never	April 1935	Paul Czinner	
Adventure Limited	April 1935	George King	
The Village Squire	April 1935	Reginald Denham	
Once a Thief	June 1935	George Pearson	
Jubilee Window	June 1935	George Pearson	
School for Stars	June 1935	Donovan Pedelty	
The Mad Hatters	July 1935	Ivar Campbell	
Cross Currents	July 1935	Adrian Brunel	
Where's George?	August 1935	Jack Raymond	
Peg of Old Drury	August 1935	Herbert Wilcox	
Lucky Days	August 1935	Reginald Denham	
While Parents Sleep	September 1935	Adrian Brunel	
Checkmate	September 1935	George Pearson	
Come Out of the Pantry	November 1935	Jack Raymond	
Expert's Opinion	November 1935	Ivar Campbell	
The Belles of St. Clements	January 1936	Ivar Campbell	
Ticket of Leave	January 1936	Michael Hankinson	
The Secret Voice	February 1937	George Pearson	
Strange Cargo	March 1936	Lawrence Huntington	
Two's Company	April 1936	Tim Whelan	
Wednesday's Luck	May 1936	George Pearson	
Two on a Doorstep	May 1936	Lawrence Huntington	Shot at Rock Studios
House Broken	June 1936	Michael Hankinson	Shot at Rock Studios
Pay Box Adventure	June 1936	W.P. Kellino	Shot at J.H. Studios
Murder by Rope	August 1936	George Pearson	Shot at Shepperton Studios
Chick	September 1936	Michael Hankinson	Shot at J.H. Studios
Grand Finale	September 1936	Ivar Campbell	Shot at Shepperton Studios
Show Flat	October 1936	Bernard Mainwaring	Shot at Shepperton Studios
The Scarab Murder Case	November 1936	Michael Hankinson	Shot at Pinewood Studios
Talk of the Devil	December 1936	Carol Reed	Shot at Pinewood Studios
Holiday's End	1937	John Paddy Carstairs	Shot at Pinewood Studios
Cross My Heart	January 1937	Bernard Mainwaring	Shot at Pinewood Studios
The Cavalier of the Streets	March 1937	Harold French	Shot at Pinewood Studios
Museum Mystery	April 1937	Clifford Gulliver	Shot at Pinewood Studios
The Fatal Hour	May 1937	George Pearson	Shot at Pinewood Studios
Night Ride	June 1937	John Paddy Carstairs	Shot at Pinewood Studios
The Last Curtain	July 1937	David MacDonald	Shot at Pinewood Studios
Missing, Believed Married	September 1937	John Paddy Carstairs	Shot at Pinewood Studios
Mr. Smith Carries On	September 1937	Lister Laurance	Shot at Pinewood Studios
Lancashire Luck	November 1937	Henry Cass	Shot at Pinewood Studios
Incident in Shanghai	January 1938	John Paddy Carstairs	Shot at Pinewood Studios

== Bibliography ==
- Low, Rachael. History of the British Film, 1918-1929. George Allen & Unwin, 1971.
- Wood, Linda. British Films, 1927–1939. British Film Institute, 1986.
