= Songs and monologues of Stanley Holloway =

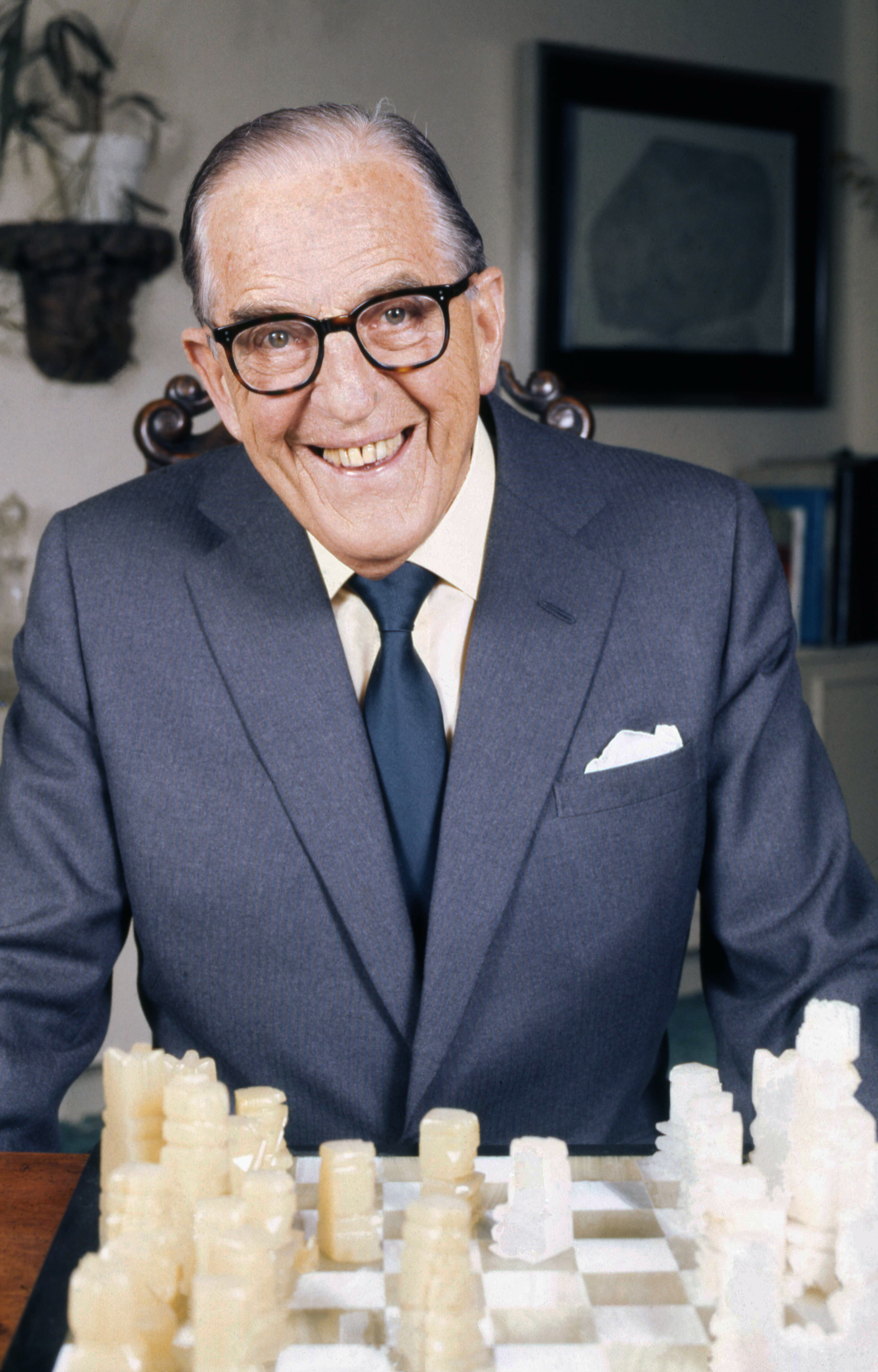
Stanley Holloway in 1974

The English comic singer, monologist and actor, Stanley Holloway (1890–1982), had a 54-year recording career, beginning in the age of acoustic recording, and ending in the era of the stereophonic LP. He mainly recorded songs from musicals and revues, and he recited many monologues on various subjects. Most prominent among his recordings (aside from his participation in recordings of My Fair Lady) are those of three series of monologues that he made at intervals throughout his career. They featured Private Sam Small, young Albert Ramsbottom and his family, and historical events such as the Battle of Hastings, Magna Carta and the Battle of Trafalgar. In all, his discography runs to 130 recordings, spanning the period 1924 to 1978. A review in The Gramophone of one of his 1957 albums containing recordings of his old "concert party" songs commented, "what a fine voice he has and how well he can use it – diction, phrasing, range and the interpretative insight of the artist".

== Recordings ==
Number	Details	Recent album on which featured	Year Recorded
The Missus and I	By John C. Holloway. from The Co-Optimists	Highlights From The Co-Optimists (2008)	1922
The Cobbler	By Herman Lohr. from The Co-Optimists	Highlights From The Co-Optimists (2008)	1923
Tommy The Whistler	By Ernest Melvin. from The Co-Optimists	Highlights From The Co-Optimists (2008)	1923
The Wheel Tapper	By Wolseley Charles. from The Co-Optimists	Highlights From The Co-Optimists (2008)	1923
Pirate Song	By H F Gilbert. from The Co-Optimists	Highlights From The Co-Optimists (2008)	1923
Cloze props	By Wolseley Charles. from The Co-Optimists	Highlights From The Co-Optimists (2008)	1924
Alouette	By E. Melvin. Duet With Gilbert Childs from The Co-Optimists	Highlights From The Co-Optimists (2008)	1924
London Town	By Melville Gideon. from The Co-Optimists	Highlights From The Co-Optimists (2008)	1924
In an old World Garden	Duet With Melville Gideon.	Highlights From The Co-Optimists (2008)	1924
Memory Street	By, and sung in duet with, Elsa Macfarlane. from The Co-Optimists	Highlights From The Co-Optimists (2008)	1924
Down Love Lane	By, and sung in duet with, Elsa Macfarlane. from The Co-Optimists	Highlights From The Co-Optimists (2008)	1924
Till the Wheel Comes Off	From The Co-Optimists	Highlights From The Co-Optimists (2008)	1925
Roundabouts and Swings	From The Co-Optimists	Highlights From The Co-Optimists (2008)	1925
Sometimes I'm Happy, Sometimes I'm Blue	By Vincent Youmans from the musical Hit the Deck	Stanley Holloway At His Very Best (2008)	1927
Join the Navy	From Hit the Deck	Stanley Holloway At His Very Best (2008)	1927
Fancy Me Just Meeting You	From Hit the Deck		1927
Sam, Sam, Pick oop thy Musket	By Stanley Holloway	Stanley Holloway:The Essential Collection (2007)	1928
Song of the Sea	From the musical Song of the Sea	Stanley Holloway The Best Of (2002)	1928
Lovely ladies	Duet with Claude Hulbert from Song of the Sea		1928
Rude Sailor	From Song of the Sea		c.1929
Little Pal			c.1929
My Old Dutch	Originally performed by Albert Chevalier	Beat The Retreat (2008)	c.1929
Come to the Cookhouse Door			c.1929
Coaling			c.1929
Old Sam	By Stanley Holloway	Stanley Holloway:The Essential Collection (2007)	1930
Alt! Who Goes There?	By Stanley Holloway	Stanley Holloway:The Essential Collection (2007)	1930
I Thowt Mebbe I Would And I Did	By Ernest Melvin	Stanley Holloway At His Very Best (2008)	1930
What Care I?	By Billy Mayerl	Stanley Holloway:The Essential Collection (2007)	1930
Beat the Retreat on thy Drum	By R. P. Weston and Bert Lee	Stanley Holloway:The Essential Collection (2007)	1931
One Each Apiece All Round	By Stanley Holloway	Stanley Holloway:The Essential Collection (2007)	1931
Brahn Boots	By Weston and Lee	Stanley Holloway:The Essential Collection (2007)	1931
The Lion and Albert	By Marriott Edgar	Stanley Holloway:The Essential Collection (2007)	1932
Hi-De-Hi		Stanley Holloway The Best Of (2002)	1932
Penny On The Drum	By Stanley Holloway	Penny On The Drum (2006)	1932
Three Ha'pence a Foot	By Marriott Edgar	Stanley Holloway:The Essential Collection (2007)	1932
A Dinder Courtship	By Frederic Weatherly and Eric Coates	Beat The Retreat (2008)	1932
Onaway awake Beloved	From Hiawatha's Wedding Feast music by Samuel Coleridge-Taylor based on the poem The Song of Hiawatha by Henry Wadsworth Longfellow		1932
Pass Everyman			1932
King John	By Stanley Holloway		1933
Sam's Medal	By Mabel Constanduros and Michael Hogan	Stanley Holloway:The Essential Collection (2007)	1933
Old Sam's Party	By Mabel Constanduros	Stanley Holloway:The Essential Collection (2007)	1933
Runcorn Ferry	By Marriott Edgar	Stanley Holloway:The Essential Collection (2007)	1933
Many Happy Returns	By Archie de Bear	Stanley Holloway:The Essential Collection (2007)	1933
Radio Stars In A Jam	Holloway attempts to recite "Pick oop thy Musket" but is interrupted by, amongst others, Clapham & Dwyer, Elsie & Doris Waters, Will Hay and Tommy Handley		1933
Gunner Joe	By Marriott Edgar	Stanley Holloway:The Essential Collection (2007)	1933
With Her Head Tucked Underneath Her Arm	By R.P Weston and Bert Lee	Stanley Holloway:The Essential Collection (2007)	1934
Marksman Sam	By Marriott Edgar and Stanley Holloway	Stanley Holloway:The Essential Collection (2007)	1934
Sam Goes to It	By Stanley Holloway	Stanley Holloway:The Essential Collection (2007)	1934
Signalman Sam	By Stanley Holloway		1934
The Return of Albert	By Marriott Edgar	Stanley Holloway:The Essential Collection (2007)	1934
Hand in Hand	By Jerome Kern and Oscar Hammerstein II from the musical Three Sisters	Penny On The Drum (2006)	1934
Keep Smiling	By Jerome Kern and Oscar Hammerstein II from the musical Three Sisters	Stanley Holloway - Keep Smiling (2006)	1934
Sam's Parrott	By V.F. Stevens and Lauri Bowen		1934
The Beefeater	By Weston and Lee	Stanley Holloway:The Essential Collection (2007)	1934
The Famous Name of Small	By V.F. Stevens and Lauri Bowen		1935
Sam Drummed Out	by Weston and Lee	Stanley Holloway:The Essential Collection (2007)	1935
Sam's Sturgeon	By Ashley Sterne	Stanley Holloway:The Essential Collection (2007)	1935
Sam Small at Westminster	By Stanley Holloway	Beat The Retreat (2008)	1935
St. George and the Dragon	By Weston and Lee		1935
Down Below	By Sydney Carter		1936
Mr. & Mrs. Ramsbottom Went Off	By Marriott Edgar; accompanied by Carroll Gibbons		1936
The Jubilee Sovrin	By Marriott Edgar	Stanley Holloway:The Essential Collection (2007)	1937
The 'Ole in the Ark	By Marriott Edgar	Stanley Holloway:The Essential Collection (2007)	1937
Albert and the 'Eadsman	By Marriott Edgar	Stanley Holloway:The Essential Collection (2007)	1937
The Battle of Hastings	By Marriott Edgar		1937
Jonah and the Grampus	By Marriott Edgar	Stanley Holloway:The Essential Collection (2007)	1937
My Word, You Do Look Queer	By R. P. Weston and Bert Lee		1938
The Parson of Puddle	By Greatrex Newman	Stanley Holloway:The Essential Collection (2007)	1938
Green-Eyed Dragon	By Greatrex Newman and Wolseley Charles		1939
Old Sam's Christmas Pudding	By Marriott Edgar. Written especially for the 1939 Christmas pantomime Mother Goose in which Holloway was starring	Stanley Holloway:The Essential Collection (2007)	1939
The Recumbent Posture	By Marriott Edgar	Stanley Holloway:The Essential Collection (2007)	1939
The Negro Preacher		Stanley Holloway:The Essential Collection (2007)	1939
Albert Evacuated	By Stanley Holloway. Tells the story of child evacuation during the war	Stanley Holloway:The Essential Collection (2007)	1940
Yorkshire Pudden!	By Weston and Lee	Penny On The Drum (2006)	1940
Careless Talk	Duet with Leslie Henson	Stanley Holloway:The Essential Collection (2007)	1940
Marksman Sam	By Marriott Edgar	Penny On The Drum (2006)	1940
Pukka Sahib	By Reginald Purdell, based on The Green Eye of the Yellow God by J. Milton Hayes		1940
The Return of Albert	By Stanley Lupino	Stanley Holloway:The Essential Collection (2007)	1940
Sam's Christmas Shopping	By Pulham J. Sherman		1940
The Food demonstration	Recorded on behalf of the British government in aid of the war effort		c.1940
Lend to Defend	Recorded on behalf of the British government in aid of the war effort		c.1940
Save your way to Victory	Recorded on behalf of the British government in aid of the war effort		1940
Sam Goes to It	By Marriott Edgar	Stanley Holloway At His Very Best (2008)	1941
No Like-a da War	Piano accompaniment by W.T. Best	Stanley Holloway At His Very Best (2008)	1941
Uppards	By Marriott Edgar	Stanley Holloway:The Essential Collection (2007)	1941
The Future Mrs 'awkins	Originally performed by Albert Chevalier, 1898	Stanley Holloway:The Essential Collection (2007)	1942
Guarding the Gasworks	By Stanley Holloway	Stanley Holloway:The Essential Collection (2007)	1942
My Missus		Stanley Holloway:The Essential Collection (2007)	1943
Don't waste bread	by Stanley Holloway. Recorded on behalf of the British government in aid of the war effort		1943
Albert and His Savings	By Marriott Edgar. Recorded on behalf of the British government in aid of the war effort	Stanley Holloway:The Essential Collection (2007)	1944
How long hast thou been Grave Maker	By William Shakespeare with Laurence Olivier. Taken from the film Hamlet released the same year	Stanley Holloway:The Essential Collection (2007)	1948
Albert Down Under	By Stanley Holloway especially for his tour of Australia.	Not released	1948
Sam's Guggle Box	By Stan Masters and Harry Stogden		1951
A Midsummer Nights Dream	By William Shakespeare. Audiobook, featuring Moira Shearer, Robert Helpmann and Micheal Benthall	A Midsummer Nights Dream by William Shakespeare (2009)	1954
Going To The Derby	Unknown	Stanley Holloway: Champagne Charlie (2011)	1954
My Lord Tomnoddy	By R. H. Barham c.1820	Stanley Holloway: Champagne Charlie (2011)	1954
Act on the Square Boys	Written and originally performed by Alfred Vance in 1866	Stanley Holloway: Champagne Charlie (2011)	1954
If I Had A Donkey	Unknown	Stanley Holloway: Champagne Charlie (2011)	1954
The Workhouse Boy	Unknown	Stanley Holloway: Champagne Charlie (2011)	1954
Married To A Mermaid	By James Thomson and David Mallet c.1740	Stanley Holloway: Champagne Charlie (2011)	1954
A Motto For Every Man	By D.K.Gavan; first performed by Harry Clifton	Stanley Holloway: Champagne Charlie (2011)	1954
Shelling Green Peas	Written and performed by Harry Clifton in 1865	Stanley Holloway: Champagne Charlie (2011)	1954
Hey! Betty Martin	Unknown	Stanley Holloway: Champagne Charlie (2011)	1954
All Around My Hat	Unknown c.1820	Stanley Holloway: Champagne Charlie (2011)	1954
Poor Old Horse	By Billy Patterson, 1868	Stanley Holloway: Champagne Charlie (2011)	1954
Champagne Charlie	Written and performed by George Leybourne in 1867	Stanley Holloway: Champagne Charlie (2011)	1954
With a Little Bit of Luck	By Alan Jay Lerner and Frederick Loewe, from My Fair Lady	My Fair Lady Soundtrack (Original Cast) - 1995	1956
Get Me to the Church on Time	By Lerner and Loewe, from My Fair Lady	My Fair Lady Soundtrack (Original Cast) - 1995	1956
Long Ago In Alcala	Written by Frederic Edward Weatherly & Adrian Ross. Music by André Messager. For the 1894 opera Mirette. With Arthur Lief (conductor and pianist) and the Concert Party Four. Recorded in New York, November 1957.	The Concert Party -1958	1957
On Strike	By Charles Pond 1906. With Arthur Lief (conductor and pianist) and the Concert Party Four. Recorded in New York, November 1957.	The Concert Party -1958	1957
Captain Mac	By P.J. O'Reilly and Wilfred Sanderson. With Arthur Lief (conductor and pianist) and the Concert Party Four. Recorded in New York, November 1957.	The Concert Party -1958	1957
The Floral Dance	By Kate Emily Barkley ("Katie") Moss. With Arthur Lief (conductor and pianist) and the Concert Party Four. Recorded in New York, November 1957.	The Concert Party -1958	1957
The Christening	By George Randell. With Arthur Lief (conductor and pianist) and the Concert Party Four. Recorded in New York, November 1957.	The Concert Party -1958	1957
Albert's Reunion	By Stanley Holloway. With Arthur Lief (conductor and pianist) and the Concert Party Four. Recorded in New York, November 1957.	The Concert Party -1958	1957
The Trumpeter	By J. Francis Barron and J. Airlie Dix. With Arthur Lief (conductor and pianist) and the Concert Party Four. Recorded in New York, November 1957.	The Concert Party -1958	1957
The King Who Wanted Jam For Tea	By Greatrex Newman and Wolseley Charles. With Arthur Lief (conductor and pianist) and the Concert Party Four. Recorded in New York, November 1957.	The Concert Party -1958	1957
I Thought Mebbe I Would-an' I Did	By Ernest Melvin (1922). Previously recorded by Holloway In 1930. With Arthur Lief (conductor and pianist) and the Concert Party Four. Recorded in New York, November 1957.	The Concert Party -1958	1957
The Street Watchman's Story	By Charles J. Winter 1910; first recorded by Bransby Williams c.1914. With Arthur Lief (conductor and pianist) and the Concert Party Four. Recorded in New York, November 1957.	The Concert Party -1958	1957
The Green-Eyed Dragon	By Greatrex Newman and Wolseley Charles. With Arthur Lief (conductor and pianist) and the Concert Party Four. Recorded in New York, November 1957.	The Concert Party -1958	1957
Up From Somerset	By Frederic Edward Weatherly. With Arthur Lief (conductor and pianist) and the Concert Party Four. Recorded in New York, November 1957.	The Concert Party -1958	1957
Sam's Christmas Pudding	By Marriott Edgar. Previously recorded by Holloway in 1939. With Arthur Lief (conductor and pianist) and the Concert Party Four. Recorded in New York, November 1957.	The Concert Party -1958	1957
Four Jolly Sailormen	By Edward German. With Arthur Lief (conductor and pianist) and the Concert Party Four. Recorded in New York, November 1957.	The Concert Party -1958	1957
Bouncing Ball	By Milton Kaye; with the Gobblegook Symphony Orchestra	Gobbledegook Songs (1957)	1957
The Gobbledegook	By Milton Kaye; with the Gobblegook S. O	Gobbledegook Songs (1957)	1957
The Lion Tamer	By Milton Kaye; with the Gobblegook S. O	Gobbledegook Songs (1957)	1957
Sven Svensen	By Milton Kaye; with the Gobblegook S. O	Gobbledegook Songs (1957)	1957
The Frog, The Duck, The Fish	By Milton Kaye; with the Gobblegook S. O	Gobbledegook Songs (1957)	1957
Wooden Shoes	By Milton Kaye; with the Gobblegook S. O	Gobbledegook Songs (1957)	1957
Ump-Diddle-Diddle	By Milton Kaye; with the Gobblegook S. O	Gobbledegook Songs (1957)	1957
The Elephant Alphabet	By Milton Kaye; with the Gobblegook S. O	Gobbledegook Songs (1957)	1957
Pete Petersen's House	By Milton Kaye; with the Gobblegook S. O	Gobbledegook Songs (1957)	1957
The Longest Train	By Milton Kaye; with the Gobblegook S. O	Gobbledegook Songs (1957)	1957
Why the Giraffe Laughed	By Milton Kaye; with the Gobblegook S. O	Gobbledegook Songs (1957)	1957
The Dancing Bear	By Milton Kaye; with the Gobblegook S. O	Gobbledegook Songs (1957)	1957
I Live In Trafalgar Square	By C.W. Murphy, first performed by Morny Cash in 1908	Let's Have A Banana (2009)	1958
Hello! Hello! Who's Your Lady Friend??	By David Worton & Bert Lee; sung by Harry Fragson, 1911	Let's Have A Banana (2009)	1958
The Little Shirt My Mother Made for Me	First recorded by Marty Robbins	Let's Have A Banana (2009)	1958
You Can Do a Lot of Things at the Seaside	Written and originally performed by Mark Sheridan, 1901	Let's Have A Banana (2009)	1958
It'll All be the Same (A Hundred Years from Now)	Unknown. Written in 1884	Let's Have A Banana (2009)	1958
My Word, You Do Look Queer	By Weston and Lee	Let's Have A Banana (2009)	1958
And Yet I Don't Know!	by R. P. Weston and Bert Lee – 1922	Let's Have A Banana (2009)	1958
I'm Shy, Mary Ellen, Im Shy	Written and performed by Jack Pleasants in 1912	Let's Have A Banana (2009)	1958
Sweeney Todd the Barber	By Weston and Lee, 1935	Let's Have A Banana (2009)	1958
Oh, I Must Go Home Tonight!	First performed by Billy Williams in 1908	Let's Have A Banana (2009)	1958
Eving's Dorg Ospital	By Stanley Holloway	Let's Have A Banana (2009)	1958
Harry Champion Medley	Includes "I'm Henery the Eighth, I Am", "Any Old Iron", "A Little Bit of Cucumber" and "Boiled Beef and Carrots"	Let's Have A Banana (2009)	1958
The Spaniard That Blighted My Life	First recorded by Billy Merson in 1911	Let's Have A Banana (2009)	1958
Let's All Go Down the Strand	Words and music by Harry Castling and C. W. Murphy	Let's Have A Banana (2009)	1958
My Old Dutch	By A.C. Ingle, first performed by Albert Chevalier in 1910	Stanley Holloway At His Very Best (2008)	1958
Phrenology	By W.S.Gilbert	Bab Ballads And Cautionary Tales (1958)	1959
The Yarn of the Nancy Bell	By W.S.Gilbert	Bab Ballads And Cautionary Tales (1958)	1959
The Sensation Captain	By W.S.Gilbert	Bab Ballads And Cautionary Tales (1958)	1959
Babette's Love	By W.S.Gilbert	Bab Ballads And Cautionary Tales (1958)	1959
Ben Allah Achmet	By W.S.Gilbert	Bab Ballads And Cautionary Tales (1958)	1959
Peter the Wag	By W.S.Gilbert	Bab Ballads And Cautionary Tales (1958)	1959
The Ape and the Lady	By W.S.Gilbert	Bab Ballads And Cautionary Tales (1958)	1959
A Dark Girl Dressed in Blue	By Harry Clifton (1868)		1959
Growing Old			1959
Macbeth	By William Shakespeare. Featuring Anthony Quayle, Ian Holm and Robert Hardy	Macbeth by William Shakespeare ( 2012)	1960
Petticoat Lane	Performed by Holloway	EMI Comedy Classics: Stanley Holloway (1991)	1960
Sing a Song of London	Written and originally performed by Ambrose		1960
Tommy the Whistler	By Ernest Melvin. This Co-Optimists song was previously recorded by Holloway in 1923	EMI Comedy Classics: Stanley Holloway (1991)	1960
If I Should Plant a Tiny Seed of love	First performed by Frank Summers (1909)	Stanley Holloway At His Very Best (2008)	1960
Any Old Iron	By Charles Collins and Terry Sheppard first performed by Harry Champion in 1911	Stanley Holloway At His Very Best (2008)	1960
A Bachelor Gay	By James W. Tate (1916).	Stanley Holloway At His Very Best (2008)	1960
Where Did You Get That Hat?	Words and music by James Rolmaz, c.1888	Stanley Holloway At His Very Best (2008)	1960
If You Were the Only Girl in the World	By Clifford Grey recorded by George Robey in 1916	Stanley Holloway At His Very Best (2008)	1960
Two Lovely Black Eyes	Performed by Charles Coborn 1886	Stanley Holloway At His Very Best (2008)	1960
The Galloping Major	Originally performed by George Bastow 1906	Stanley Holloway At His Very Best (2008)	1960
Join in the Chorus/Lily of Laguna	By Leslie Stuart, originally performed by Eugene Stratton in 1898	Stanley Holloway At His Very Best (2008)	1960
While Strolling in the Park, By Alfred Vance in 1868	Stanley Holloway At His Very Best (2008)	1960	
Down at the Old Bull and Bush	By Billy Murray. Popularised by Florrie Forde. The song was written about The Old Bull and Bush public house in Hampstead Heath, London	Stanley Holloway At His Very Best (2008)	1960
With Aspect Stern	From "The Mikado" By W.S.Gilbert and Arthur Sullivan; with Groucho Marx	Groucho Marx in the Mikado (2012)	1960
The Criminal Cried	From "The Mikado" By W.S.Gilbert and Arthur Sullivan; with Groucho Marx and Sharon Randal	Groucho Marx in the Mikado (2012)	1960
The Flowers that Bloom in the Spring	From "The Mikado" By W.S.Gilbert and Arthur Sullivan; with Groucho Marx, Barbara Meister, Robert Rounseville and Sharon Randal	Groucho Marx in the Mikado (2012)	1960
Pick a Pocket or Two	From Oliver!, words and music by Lionel Bart; with studio cast	Oliver! London Studio Cast Soundtrack (1993) - LP	1961
Reviewing the Situation	From Oliver!', words and music by Lionel Bart; with studio cast	Oliver! London Studio Cast Soundtrack (1993) - LP	1961
Be Back Soon	From Oliver!', words and music by Lionel Bart; with studio cast	Oliver! London Studio Cast Soundtrack (1993) - LP	1961
I'd Do Anything	From Oliver!, words and music by Lionel Bart; with studio cast	Oliver! London Studio Cast Soundtrack (1993) - LP	1961
The Third Sam	By Stanley Holloway		1962
Hello, Dolly!	by Jerry Herman		1965
As Time Goes By	By Herman Hupfeld		1965
London Pride	By Noël Coward	More Monologues and Songs (2002)	1965
I'm Old Fashioned	By Johnny Mercer and Jerome Kern		1965
Fishing	By Leslie Sarony		1965
That's Entertainment!	By Arthur Schwartz and Howard Dietz		1965
Comedy Tonight	from A Funny Thing Happened on the Way to the Forum by Stephen Sondheim; originally performed by Zero Mostel	EMI Comedy Classics: Stanley Holloway (1991)	1965
The King's New Clothes	By Frank Loesser		1965
Try to Remember	By Tom Jones and Harvey Schmidt		1965
Burlington Bertie	By Harry B. Norris	More Monologues and Songs (2002)	1965
Summer Green - Winter White	By Cyril Ornadel and Norman Newell		1965
Hey, Look Me Over	By Carolyn Leigh and Cy Coleman		1965
It Were All Green Hills	By Stanley Holloway		1974
My Word, You Do Look Queer	Previously recorded by Holloway in 1958		1975
Marksman Sam	By Marriott Edgar and Stanley Holloway. Previously recorded by Holloway in 1934		1975
The Parson Of Puddle	By Greatrex Newman. Previously recorded by Holloway in 1938		1975
Gunner Joe	By Marriott Edgar. Previously recorded by Holloway in 1933		1975
Hand In Hand	By Jerome Kern and Oscar Hammerstein II. Previously recorded by Holloway in 1934		1975
And Yet I Don't Know	Previously recorded by Holloway in 1958		1975
Albert's Reunion	By Stanley Holloway. Previously recorded by Holloway in 1957		1975
The Magna Charter	By Marriott Edgar		1975
Recumbent Posture	By Marriott Edgar. Previously recorded by Holloway in 1939		1975
Life Is What You Make It			1975

=== Original albums ===
- A Midsummer Nights Dream - 1954 (Audiobook)
- Champagne Charlie - 1954
- My Fair Lady (Original Cast) - 1956
- Stanley Holloway's Concert Party - 1957
- Nonsense Verse Of Carroll And Lear - 1957
- Gobbledegook Songs - 1957
- The Concert Party -1958
- 'Ere's 'Olloway - 1958
- Alice In Wonderland - 1958
- Through The Looking Glass - 1958
- Bab Ballads And Cautionary Tales - 1958
- My Fair Lady (London Cast) - 1959
- Join In The Chorus - 1960
- The Mikado - 1960
- Geoffrey Chaucer- Canterbury Tales - 1962
- Oliver! - 1962
- As You Like It - 1962
- MacBeth - 1962
- Tavern Songs of Old London - 1963
- My Fair Lady (Soundtrack) - 1964
- Stanley, I Presume - 1965
- The World Of Stanley Holloway - 1971
- Life In The Old Dog Yet - 1975

=== Compilation albums ===
- Let's all go to the Music Hall Original release August 1975
- EMI Comedy Classics: Stanley Holloway – Original release date – 17 May 1991
- The Classic Monologues – Original release date – 4 September 2000
- His Greatest Performances – Original release date – 22 March 2001
- Monologues... And More! – Original release date – 5 November 2001
- Stanley Holloway The Best Of – Original release date – 29 April 2002
- Keep Smiling – Original release date – 3 June 2006
- Penny On The Drum – Original release date – 6 July 2006
- With A Little Bit O' Luck – The Songs and Monologues Of Stanley Holloway – Original release date – 7 May 2007
- The Essential Collection (2CD) – Original release date – 2 August 2007
- Stanley Holloway At His Very Best – Original release date – 26 February 2008
- Beat The Retreat – Original release date – 3 March 2008
- ere's 'olloway – Original release date – 18 November 2008
- Let's Have A Banana – Original release date – 3 January 2009
- British & American Comedy Legends – Original release date 1 August 2010 – Various Artists
- The Bab Ballads – Original release date – 20 August 2009
- Famous Adventures With Old Sam and the Ramsbottoms – Original release date – 3 January 2010
- Old Sam & Young Albert – Original Recordings 1930-1940
- War Songs That United a Country – the Complete Collection (War Songs That United a Country – the Complete Collection) – Original release date 1 January 2010 (featured only)
- Highlights From The Co-Optimists Various Recordings by original cast members. Tracks featuring Stanley Holloway Disc 1 tracks: 6, 8, 13, 15. Disc two tracks: 1, 2. – Original release date – 1 August 2008
- Stanley Holloway: Champagne Charlie – Original release date – 1 May 2011
- Macbeth by William Shakespeare – Original release date – 1 January 2012 (Audio book)

== See also ==
- Stanley Holloway on stage and screen
