= Up for the Cup =

Up for the Cup may refer to:

- Up for the Cup (1931 film), a British film directed by Jack Raymond
- Up for the Cup (1950 film), a remake also directed by Jack Raymond
