= These Foolish Things (disambiguation) =

These Foolish Things may refer to:

- "These Foolish Things (Remind Me of You)", 1935 popular song
- These Foolish Things (album) (1973), Bryan Ferry singing standards
- These Foolish Things (film) (2005), based on Noel Langley's novel There's a Porpoise Close Behind us
- These Foolish Things (revue), a 1938 British revue
- Daddy Nostalgie, 1990 French-English film starring Dirk Bogarde, released as These Foolish Things in the UK
