= Good-bye-ee! =

Song by R. P. Weston and Bert Lee

"Good-bye-ee!" is a popular song written and composed by R. P. Weston and Bert Lee. Performed by music hall stars Florrie Forde, Daisy Wood, and Charles Whittle, it was a hit in 1917.

Weston and Lee got the idea for the song when they saw a group of factory girls calling out goodbye to soldiers marching to Victoria station. They were saying the word in the exaggerated way which had been popularised as a catchphrase by comedian Harry Tate. They then travelled to Brighton and wrote the song on a wet afternoon in their cabin under the pier.

The song lent its name to "Goodbyeee", the final episode of the sitcom Blackadder Goes Forth.

== Chorus ==
Good-bye-ee! good-bye-ee!
Wipe the tear, baby dear, from your eye-ee.
Tho' it's hard to part I know,
I'll be tickled to death to go.
Don't cry-ee! don't sigh-ee!
There's a silver lining in the sky-ee.
Bonsoir old thing, cheerio! chin chin!
Nah-poo! Toodle-oo!
Good-bye-ee!

The salutations at the end of the chorus are from various languages. Bonsoir is French for goodnight. Chin chin is a Chinese toast. "Nahpoo" and "toodle-oo" are English idioms from corruptions of the French il n'y en a plus (there is no more) and à tout à l'heure (see you later).
