= The English Rose =

1920 film directed by Fred Paul

- Directed by: Fred Paul
- Written by: Robert Buchanan (play); Paul Rooff; George R. Sims (play)
- Produced by: John Robyns
- Starring: Humberston Wright
- Production company: British Standard
- Distributed by: Whincup
- Release date: December 1920
- Country: United Kingdom
- Languages: Silent; English intertitles

The English Rose is a 1920 British silent drama film directed by Fred Paul and starring Humberston Wright.

== Cast ==
- Fred Paul as Father Michael
- Humberston Wright as Captain MacDonnell
- Sydney Folker as Harry O'Malley
- Mary Morton
- Jack Raymond
- Amy Brandon Thomas
- George Turner
- Clifford Desborough

== Bibliography ==
- Low, Rachael. History of the British Film, 1918-1929. George Allen & Unwin, 1971.
