= The Two Bobs =

American vaudeville duo

The Two Bobs were an American vaudeville duo who performed successfully in British music halls, and recorded, in the early twentieth century. They were Robert Lee Alden (1876–1932) and Robert Joseph Adams (1874–1948).

== Biography ==
Bob Adams and Bob Alden met and joined forces when they were both performing in shows in Chicago. They wrote and sang songs such as "My Girl in Dixie" and "You've Met All Comers But You've Just Met Me", and performed together on stage in New York City in the late 1890s before touring on the vaudeville circuit around the United States. After a journalist misinterpreted a passing comment as meaning that they were about to travel to England, and published it as fact, they decided to do that, and found work at Charles Morton's Tivoli Theatre in London.

They became successful in London as singers and comic entertainers, and toured in Britain and, in 1914, Australia. From 1912, the Two Bobs recorded in Britain for the Columbia Phonograph Company, and introduced such American songs as "Alexander's Ragtime Band", "Casey Jones", and "Waiting for the Robert E. Lee". From 1916, they recorded for Edison Bell's 'The Winner' label. They wrote many of their own songs, and increasingly focused on novelty songs. They also wrote with English songwriters Bert Lee and R. P. Weston, and found success with "When Paderewski Plays" (1916) and with "Paddy McGinty's Goat", a song which they recorded and which was popularised in the 1960s by singer Val Doonican.

Adams married the French-born violinist and entertainer Odette Myrtil in 1917, and returned to the U.S.; they later divorced. After he returned to England, he ran a club in Maidenhead, Berkshire. Alden and Adams continued to perform together in England until at least 1927.

Alden died in London in 1932, aged 55. Adams died in 1948, aged 74.
