= Up for the Cup (1950 film) =

- Original British lobby card
- Directed by: Jack Raymond
- Written by: Jack Marks; Con West
- Based on: original story by R.P. Weston and Bert Lee
- Produced by: Alan J. Cullimore; Henry Halstead
- Starring: Albert Modley
- Cinematography: Henry Harris
- Edited by: Gerald Landau
- Music by: Percival Mackey; Malcolm Arnold (uncredited)
- Production company: Byron Films
- Distributed by: Associated British-Pathé (UK)
- Release date: 16 April 1950
- Running time: 76 minutes
- Country: United Kingdom
- Language: English

Up for the Cup is a 1950 British comedy film directed by Jack Raymond and starring Albert Modley, Mae Bacon, Helen Christie and Harold Berens. It was written by Jack Marks and Con West from a story by R.P. Weston and Bert Lee.

The film is a remake of the 1931 film Up for the Cup, also directed by Raymond.

== Plot ==
The Yorkshire inventor of a loom, Albert Entwhistle, heads for London to see the Football Association Cup Final. He has a nightmare of a day when his wallet is stolen and then his girl friend stands him up. Chaos ensues, but in the end, Albert wins his girlfriend back and also a contract for his invention, along with a fortune in cash.

== Cast ==
- Albert Modley as Albert Entwhistle
- Mae Bacon as Maggie Entwhistle
- Helen Christie as Jane
- Harold Berens as auctioneer
- Wallas Eaton as barrowboy
- Jack Melford as barrowboy
- Charmian Innes as clippie
- Arthur Gomez as snack bar proprietor
- Lila Molnar as fortune teller
- Fred Groves as Mr. Hardcastle
- John Warren as Mr. Cartwright

== Reception ==
The Monthly Film Bulletin wrote: "A good-natured comedy with characteristic performance by Albert Modley and much incidental humour."

Kine Weekly wrote: "The picture is not designed for sophisticated audiences, but it offers the majority of filmgoers honest, down-to-earth and typically English comedy fare. ... More than adequately staged and immensely topical, it should score heavily with the 'populars' and, of course, up North."

Picturegoer wrote: "Modley easily adapts his radio and music hall technique to the even more exacting demands of the screen and gives a new twist to familiar gags and situations. Authentic stadium sequences, neatly dovetailed, effectively round off laughable, typically British comedy fare. Second Division films, like Second Division football, are often more entertaining than First, and here's a case in point."

Leslie Halliwell wrote "Slap-happy star farce, which pleased the public."

In British Sound Films: The Studio Years 1928–1959 David Quinlan rated the film as "good", writing: "Wild comedy never lets up throughout, is one of the best of the 'regional' farces."
