= French Leave (1930 film) =

1930 film

- Haddon Mason & Madeleine Carroll
- Directed by: Jack Raymond
- Written by: Reginald Berkeley (play and screenplay); W. P. Lipscomb
- Produced by: Henry Defries; Sam Harrison
- Starring: Madeleine Carroll; Sydney Howard; Arthur Chesney
- Cinematography: Bernard Knowles
- Production companies: D&H Productions
- Distributed by: Sterling Films
- Release date: 21 August 1930 (London UK)
- Running time: 100 minutes
- Country: United Kingdom
- Language: English

French Leave is a 1930 British comedy film directed by Jack Raymond and starring Madeleine Carroll, Sydney Howard and Arthur Chesney. It was made at British and Dominions Elstree Studios. It is based on a play by Reginald Berkeley, a "light comedy in three acts", set during the First World War. It was remade in 1937 by Norman Lee.

== Plot ==
During World War I, Captain's wife Dorothy Glenister finds it hard being separated from her husband, so she travels to France to the village where he's stationed. Dorothy disguises herself as the daughter of a local, which leads to complications when she's suspected of being a German spy.

== Cast ==
- Madeleine Carroll as Mlle. Juliette / Dorothy Glenister
- Sydney Howard as Cpl. Sykes
- Arthur Chesney as General Root
- Haddon Mason as Captain Harry Glenister
- Henry Kendall as Lt. George Graham
- May Agate as Mme. Denaux
- George Owen as Pvt. Jenks
- George De Warfaz as Jules Marnier

== Critical reception ==
The New York Times called it "a moderately amusing British picturization of the stage farce, "French Leave," with the charming Madeleine Carroll... the photography is sometimes none too clear, but the voices are nicely recorded"; while more recently, TV Guide thought it a "lame comedy...Long and tedious at 60 minutes; the original British cut ran 100 minutes."

== Bibliography ==
- Low, Rachael. Filmmaking in 1930s Britain. George Allen & Unwin, 1985.
- Wood, Linda. British Films, 1927-1939. British Film Institute, 1986.
