= He Wanted Adventure =

1933 musical

- Music: Jack Waller; Joseph Tunbridge
- Lyrics: Clifford Grey
- Book: R. P. Weston; Bert Lee
- Basis: Ambrose Applejohn's Adventure
- Productions: Saville Theatre (1933)

He Wanted Adventure is a 1933 musical by R. P. Weston and Bert Lee. Music was written by Jack Waller and Joseph Tunbridge, with additional lyrics provided by Clifford Grey. It is based on Walter Hackett's 1921 hit play Ambrose Applejohn's Adventure.

Premiering at the Palace Theatre, Manchester it transferred to the West End for a 152 performances at the Saville Theatre which lasted between 28 March and 19 August 1933. The original London cast included Bobby Howes, Wylie Watson, Abraham Sofaer, Judy Gunn, Lena Halliday and Marie Burke.

== Bibliography ==
- Wearing, J.P. The London Stage 1930-1939: A Calendar of Productions, Performers, and Personnel. Rowman & Littlefield, 2014.
