= Proper Cup of Coffee =

Novelty song from 1926 by Bert Lee and R. P. Weston

"Proper Cup of Coffee" or "What I Want Is a Proper Cup of Coffee" (Roud: V53398) is a 1926 novelty song by music hall composers Bert Lee and R. P. Weston. An early recording was by Ernie Mayne and it was recorded by the Andrews Sisters in 1958. It has since been covered by several artists, most notably Cosmotheka and Trout Fishing in America. It is often performed at folk clubs.
