= Harry Fay =

English singer and entertainer

- Born: Henry Thomas Fahey; 22 May 1878; Liverpool, England
- Died: 4 September 1956 (aged 78); Barnet, Hertfordshire, England
- Occupation(s): Singer, comic entertainer
- Years active: 1890s–c.1930

Henry Thomas Fahey (22 May 1878 – 4 September 1956) was an English singer and comic entertainer who recorded popular songs between the 1900s and late 1920s under a variety of names, including Harry Fay, Fred Vernon, Arthur Norton, Jack Hay, and Harry Carlton.

== Biography ==
He was born in Liverpool into a family of Irish origin. He performed on stage in music halls, before making records, starting no later than 1906 and continuing through the 1910s and 1920s. As Harry Fay, he recorded for Zonophone Records. The 1919 catalogue for the record label lists him as a "comedian", with over 60 songs recorded as a solo performer, as well as several duets with baritone singer Stanley Kirkby. Among the popular songs he recorded were "Has Anybody Here Seen Kelly?", "By the Light of the Silvery Moon", "Lily of Laguna", "It's a Long Way to Tipperary", "Alexander's Ragtime Band", and "Hello! Hello! Who's Your Lady Friend?". For the Columbia-Rena label, he recorded "Let's All Go Down the Strand", one of his biggest successes, in 1910. He also recorded for many other labels, using different pseudonyms, and continued to record comic and other songs until at least 1929.

He died in hospital at Barnet, Hertfordshire, in 1956.
