= Mary Morton (disambiguation) =

Mary Morton (1879–1965) was an English sculptor. Mary Morton may also refer to:

- Mary Morton (actress) (c. 1756–1800), British stage actress
- Mary Morton Allport (1806–1895), English Australian artist
- Mary Morton Kehew (1859–1918), American labor- and social reformer
