= It's a Cop =

- Feature on the film in Illustrated Sporting and Dramatic News (Jan 27, 1934)
- Directed by: Maclean Rogers
- Written by: Bert Lee; Jack Marks; R. P. Weston; John Paddy Carstairs
- Produced by: Herbert Wilcox
- Starring: Sydney Howard; Chili Bouchier; Garry Marsh
- Cinematography: Cyril Bristow
- Production company: British and Dominions
- Distributed by: United Artists
- Release date: March 1934
- Running time: 86 minutes
- Country: United Kingdom
- Language: English

It's a Cop is a 1934 British police-themed comedy film directed by Maclean Rogers and starring Sydney Howard, Chili Bouchier and Garry Marsh. It was written by Bert Lee, Jack Marks, R. P. Weston and John Paddy Carstairs, and made at British and Dominion Elstree Studios.

== Plot ==
An incompetent police constable gets a lucky break and catches some thieves, earning his promotion to sergeant.

== Cast ==
- Sydney Howard as PC Robert Spry
- Chili Bouchier as Babette
- Donald Calthrop as Charles Murray
- Garry Marsh as James Risden
- Annie Esmond as Mrs. Spry
- Cyril Smith as Lewis
- John Turnbull as Inspector Gray
- Ronald Simpson as Bates

== Reception ==
Kine Weekly wrote: "This comedy has an excepuonally good cast, and is well staged, but the story is slight and obvious, most of the jokes are stale, and the pace is far from hectic. ... There are a few laughs, but barely enough to justify the film's footage."

The Daily Film Renter wrote: "Original comedy vehicle exploiting star's, characteristic brand of thick-witted humour. ... The situations in this film are reminiscent of Harold Lloyd, a fact which yields the impression that Howard is finding a new metier as far as the screen is concerned.
