= The Flat (1921 film) =

1921 film

- Directed by: Fred Paul
- Starring: Jack Raymond; George Foley
- Release date: 1921

The Flat is a 1921 British silent drama film directed by Fred Paul and starring Jack Raymond and George Foley. Its plot involves a man who is invited back to a flat for a drink by a stranger he meets in a pub. It was part of a Grand Guignol series of films.

== Cast ==
- Jack Raymond - John Timkins
- George Foley - The Stranger
