= Sydney Howard =

English actor and comedian (1884–1946)

- Born: 7 August 1885; Leeds, Yorkshire, United Kingdom
- Died: 22 June 1946 (aged 60); London, United Kingdom
- Occupation(s): Actor, comedian
- Years active: 1929–1945 (film)

Sydney Howard (7 August 1884 – 12 June 1946) was an English stage comedian and film actor born in Leeds, West Riding of Yorkshire.

Already a major stage star, Howard made his feature film début in Jack Raymond's Splinters (1929), and went on appearing in unique roles in films such as French Leave, Up for the Cup and The Mayor's Nest. Despite his popularity in the 1920s and 1930s films he appeared in, Howard is almost totally forgotten today. His most revived film is When We Are Married, in which he played a drunken photographer.

In 1937, British exhibitors voted him the 10th most popular British star at the box office.

== Filmography ==
- Splinters (1929)
- French Leave (1930)
- Tilly of Bloomsbury (1931)
- Up for the Cup (1931)
- Splinters in the Navy (1931)
- Almost a Divorce (1931)
- The Mayor's Nest (1932)
- Trouble (1933)
- Up for the Derby (1933)
- Night of the Garter (1933)
- It's a King (1933)
- It's a Cop (1934)
- Girls, Please! (1934)
- Transatlantic Merry-Go-Round (1934)
- Where's George? (1935)
- Chick (1936)
- Fame (1936)
- Splinters in the Air (1937)
- What a Man! (1938)
- Shipyard Sally (1939)
- Tilly of Bloomsbury (1940)
- Mr. Proudfoot Shows a Light (1941, short)
- Once a Crook (1941)
- When We Are Married (1943)
- Flight from Folly (1945)
