= Up for the Derby =

1933 film

- Trade advertisement
- Directed by: Maclean Rogers
- Written by: Bert Lee; Jack Marks; R. P. Weston
- Produced by: Herbert Wilcox
- Starring: Sydney Howard; Dorothy Bartlam; Tom Helmore
- Cinematography: Cyril Bristow; Freddie Young
- Edited by: Cecil H. Williamson
- Music by: Lew Stone; Harris Weston
- Production company: British and Dominions
- Distributed by: Woolf & Freedman Film Service
- Release date: 1933
- Running time: 70 minutes
- Country: United Kingdom
- Language: English

Up for the Derby is a 1933 British sports comedy film directed by Maclean Rogers and starring Sydney Howard, Dorothy Bartlam and Tom Helmore. It was written by Bert Lee, Jack Marks and R. P. Weston. It was made at British and Dominion Elstree Studios. The film's sets were designed by the art director Frederick Pusey.

== Plot ==
A tramp unexpectedly comes into some money, and buys a racehorse which goes on to win The Derby.

== Cast ==
- Sydney Howard as Joe Burton
- Dorothy Bartlam as Dorothy Gordon
- Mark Daly as Jerry Higgs
- Tom Helmore as Ronnie Gordon
- Frederick Lloyd as Major Edwards
- Franklyn Bellamy as Palmer
- Jane Carr as singer
- Frank Harvey as George Moberley
- Lew Stone and his band as themselves

== Reception ==
Film Weekly wrote: "Two towering assets overwhelm any weaknesses, which may be found in Up for the Derby. It is utterly efficient, packing a wealth of realistic detail into a fantastic story, and it has Sydney Howard, one of the genuinely born-funny men of the screen, as a pillar of strength all the way through. Indeed, so powerful are these factors that the film would still be good if the other component parts were weaker than they are."

Kine Weekly wrote: "The star's particular brand of humour is very well catered for in the story of a tramp who buys a Derby winner. It will prove a very good attraction for the masses. ... Sydney Howard gives a typical performance and holds the stage most of the time.... Straightforward direction which allows for some excellent topical of the Derby. The humor is of a broad type but is well put over, although in two instances it steps over the border line of decency."

== See also ==
- List of films about horses
- List of films about horse racing
