= Bert Lee =

English musical artist (1880–1946)

- Born: William Herbert Lee; 11 June 1880; Ravensthorpe, West Riding of Yorkshire, England
- Died: 23 January 1946 (aged 65) Llandudno, Caernarfonshire, Wales
- Genre: Music hall
- Occupation: Songwriter
- Years active: 1910–c.1940

William Herbert Lee (11 June 1880 – 23 January 1946) was an English songwriter. He wrote for music hall and the musical stage, often in partnership with R. P. Weston.

== Life and career ==
Lee was born in Ravensthorpe, Yorkshire, England. He played organ in his local chapel as a child, and initially worked as a piano tuner in Manchester, before joining a travelling concert party as a pianist. His first successful song as a writer was "Joshu-ah!", co-written with George Arthurs and performed by Clarice Mayne in 1910. He found further success in 1913 with "Hello! Hello! Who's Your Lady Friend?", written with Worton David and the song's performer, Harry Fragson.

In 1915, music publisher David Day, of Francis, Day and Hunter, introduced Lee to R. P. Weston, the collaborator with whom Lee had the most lasting relationship. They immediately found success together with "Lloyd George's Beer Song" (1915), "Good-bye-ee!" (1917, made popular by Florrie Forde), and "Paddy McGinty's Goat", revived by Val Doonican in 1964. They worked together over the next twenty years on some 3000 songs and monologues, 75 stage shows and musicals, and 17 films, as well as for pantomimes and radio shows. As well as songs for revues, notably those produced by Lupino Lane, they wrote sketches for such stars as Fred Karno, Robb Wilton and Wee Georgie Wood. Their collaborations were conducted in Weston's house in Twickenham. They kept office hours, met every day and aimed to write at least one song each day. Both Lee and Weston wrote both words and music, but according to Lee: "Bob [Weston] has the brains. I put the laughs in."

In the 1920s, Weston and Lee wrote for many theatre productions, and adapted many American productions for the British stage. In 1926, they started working with theatre producers Jack Waller and Joe Tunbridge, and wrote several musical comedies together, mostly featuring the comedian Bobby Howes. They also worked with Gracie Fields and the Crazy Gang. They wrote the popular monologue "My Word, You Do Look Queer", first recorded by Ernest Hastings in 1922 and later popularised by Stanley Holloway. Weston and Lee wrote several of Holloway's monologues in the 1930s. Together with Weston's son Harris Weston (born Robert Edgar Harris, 1901–1978), they wrote Holloway's 1934 monologue "With Her Head Tucked Underneath Her Arm", about the ghost of Anne Boleyn haunting the Tower of London, seeking revenge on Henry VIII for having her beheaded.

The duo also wrote music for film, including the book and lyrics for O-kay for Sound, a 1937 film. Much of their music was written specifically for actors Sydney Howard and Stanley Holloway, both noted comedians of the 1920s and 1930s. These included "Splinters in the Air" for Howard and "Squibs" for Holloway. Among Lee's most enduring tunes is "Knees Up Mother Brown", which is traditionally associated with Cockney culture. This was written in 1938 in collaboration with R. P. Weston's son, Harris Weston. In 1938, Lee and Harris Weston co-wrote the hit stage revue These Foolish Things which starred The Crazy Gang and the Sherman Fisher Girls. The same year Lee contributed to the musical The Fleet's Lit Up.

In 1939, Lee and his wife went on holiday to Llandudno in north Wales, and at the outbreak of the Second World War decided to settle in the town. He died there in January 1946, aged 65.

== Select filmography (as writer) ==
- Yes, Madam? (1939)
- Hold My Hand (1938)
- Splinters in the Air (1937)
- Fame (1936)
- Squibs (1935)
- Where's George? (1935)
- Girls, Please! (1934)
- It's a Cop (1934)
- This Is the Life (1933)
- Up for the Derby (1933)
- It's a King (1933)
- Trouble (1933)
- The Mayor's Nest (1932)
- Up for the Cup (1931)
- Splinters in the Navy (1931)
- No Lady (1931)

== Selected stage works ==
- He Wanted Adventure (1933)
- These Foolish Things (1938)

== Songs (partial list) ==
- 1910 "Joshua" w.m George Arthurs & Bert Lee
- 1912 "Hello, Hello, Who's Your Lady Friend?" w.m. Harry Fragson, Worton David & Bert Lee
- 1915 "Lloyd George's Beer Song" with R. P. Weston
- 1916 "At Finnigan's Ball" w.m. Bert Lee
- 1916 "Blighty, the Soldier's Home Sweet Home" w.m. R.P. Weston & Bert Lee
- 1917 "Paddy McGinty's Goat" w.m. R.P. Weston, Bert Lee & The Two Bobs
- 1917 "Good-bye-ee!" w.m. R. P. Weston & Bert Lee
- 1919 "It's Hard to Settle Down to Civilian Life Once More" w.m. R.P Weston & Bert Lee
- 1920 "The Gipsy Warned Me" w.m. R. P. Weston & Bert Lee
- 1921 "You're Well Dressed If You're Wearing a Smile" w.m. R. P. Weston & Bert Lee
- 1922 "My Word You Do Look Queer" w.m. R. P. Weston & Bert Lee
- 1926 "The Tears Shed in London Tonight" w.m. R. P. Weston & Bert Lee
- 1926 "What I Want is a Proper Cup of Coffee" w.m. R. P. Weston & Bert Lee
- 1928 "All Mine" Douglas Furber, R. P. Weston, Bert Lee m. Jack Waller & Joseph Tunbridge from the Musical Virginia
- 1932 "Sing, Brothers" w. Bert Lee & R. P. Weston m. Jack Waller & Joseph Tunbridge from the Musical Tell Her the Truth
- 1932 "Horrortorio" w. Bert Lee & R. P. Weston m. Jack Waller & Joseph Tunbridge from the Musical Tell Her the Truth
- 1934 "With Her Head Tucked Underneath Her Arm" w.m. R. P. Weston & Bert Lee
- 1936 "And The Great Big Saw Came Nearer And Nearer" w.m. Robert E. Harris, Dwight B. Latham, Bert Lee & R. P. Weston
- 1938 "Knees Up Mother Brown" w.m. Harris Weston & Bert Lee
- 1940 "Brahn Boots" w.m. R. P. Weston & Bert Lee
