= Lloyd George's Beer Song =

1915 song by R. P. Weston and Bert Lee

Song
- Published: 1915
- Songwriters: R.P. Weston; Bert Lee

"Lloyd George's Beer Song" is a World War I era song written and composed by R. P. Weston and Bert Lee. The song is a response, or rather a good-natured complaint, against then Prime Minister David Lloyd George's actions to reduce alcohol consumption during wartime.

== Lyrics ==
We shall win the war, we shall win the war,
As I said before, we shall win the war.
The Kaiser's in a dreadful fury,
Now he knows we're making it at every brewery.
Have you read of it, seen what's said of it,
In the Mirror and the Mail?
It's a substitute, and a pubstitute,
And it's known as Government Ale (or otherwise).
Lloyd George's Beer, Lloyd George's Beer.
At the brewery, there's nothing doing,
All the water works are brewing,
Lloyd George's Beer, it isn't dear.
Oh they say it's a terrible war, oh law,
And there never was a war like this before,
But the worst thing that ever happened in this war
Is Lloyd George's Beer.
Buy a lot of it, all they've got of it.
Dip your bread in it, shove your head in it
From January to October,
And I'll bet a penny that you'll still be sober.
Get your cloth in it, make some broth in it,
With a pair of mutton chops.
Drown your dogs in it, pop your clogs in it,
And you'll see some wonderful sights (in that lovely stuff).
Lloyd George's Beer, Lloyd George's Beer.
At the brewery, there's nothing doing,
All the water works are brewing,
Lloyd George's Beer, it isn't dear.
With Haig and Joffre when affairs look black,
And you can't get at Jerry with his gas attack.
Just get your squirters out and we'll squirt the buggers back,
With Lloyd George's Beer.
