= Cyril Bristow =

British cinematographer (1899–1978)

- Born: 1899; Medway, Kent, England, United Kingdom of Great Britain and Ireland
- Died: 1978 (aged 78–79); Surrey, England, United Kingdom
- Occupation: Cinematographer
- Years active: 1932–1949

Cyril Bristow (1899–1978) was a British cinematographer who worked on roughly thirty films during the 1930s and 1940s at a variety of British studios.

== Selected filmography ==
- The Love Contract (1932)
- The Mayor's Nest (1932)
- Up to the Neck (1933)
- General John Regan (1933)
- Up for the Derby (1933)
- It's a King (1933)
- Sorrell and Son (1934)
- Dangerous Ground (1934)
- It's a Cop (1934)
- Lilies of the Field (1934)
- Girls, Please! (1934)
- Radio Parade of 1935 (1934)
- Hyde Park Corner (1935)
- The Gay Adventure (1936)
- The Limping Man (1936)
- The Cardinal (1936)
- Big Fella (1937)
- Boys Will Be Girls (1937)
- Cotton Queen (1937)
- Midnight Menace (1937)
- Follow Your Star (1938)
- Escape from Broadmoor (1948)
- Stop Press Girl (1949)
- Boys in Brown (1949)
- The Man from Yesterday (1949)

== Bibliography ==
- Nollen, Scott Allen. Paul Robeson: Film Pioneer. McFarland, 2010.
