= The Mayor's Nest =

1932 British comedy film

- Trade show advertisement
- Directed by: Maclean Rogers
- Written by: Bert Lee; Jack Marks; Maclean Rogers; R. P. Weston
- Produced by: Herbert Wilcox
- Starring: Sydney Howard; Claude Hulbert; Al Bowlly
- Cinematography: Cyril Bristow; Freddie Young
- Music by: Harris Weston
- Production company: British and Dominions
- Distributed by: Woolf & Freedman Film Service
- Release date: 27 June 1932
- Running time: 74 minutes
- Country: United Kingdom
- Language: English

The Mayor's Nest is a 1932 British comedy film directed by Maclean Rogers and starring Sydney Howard, Claude Hulbert and Al Bowlly. It was written by Bert Lee, Jack Marks, Rogers and R. P. Weston, and was made at Elstree Studios.

== Synopsis ==
A trombonist becomes mayor of a small town, but he struggles to cope with municipal issues.

== Cast ==
- Sydney Howard as Joe Pilgrim
- Claude Hulbert as Algernon Ashcroft
- Al Bowlly as George
- Muriel Aked as Mrs. Ashcroft
- Frank Harvey as Councillor Blackett
- Michael Hogan as Tom Ackroyd
- Miles Malleson as clerk
- Cyril Smith as magistrate
- Syd Crossley as milkman

== Critical reception ==
Film Weekly wrote: "The direction of P. Maclean Rogers thoroughly competent as far as it goes. His principal fault is the fault, inherent in the entire production, of underlining the obvious at the expense of slickness and speed."

Kine Weekly wrote: " comedy, which makes good-humored sport of civic affairs and personalities, furnishes a good vehicle for the quaint drolleries of Sydney Howard and the asinine humor of Claude Hubert. The fun is not fast and furious, but it succeeds in rousing an easy succession of quiet chuckles."

Film Pictorial gave a positive review and described it as "broad fun" but "not quite so riotous, possibly, as some of his (Sydney Howard’s) other films." It concluded by saying, "Some of the production drags in parts – just a little tightening up would have made a wonderful improvement – but we think that the Sydney Howard enthusiasts will find their full quota of laughs. Claude Hulbert does some very good work, too, and Muriel Aked is one of those dear old fussy busybodies who gets on everybody's nerves."
