= Girls, Please! =

- Sydney Howard in the film
- Directed by: Jack Raymond
- Written by: Michael Hankinson; Bert Lee; Jack Marks; Basil Mason; R. P. Weston
- Produced by: Herbert Wilcox
- Starring: Sydney Howard; Jane Baxter; Meriel Forbes
- Cinematography: Cyril Bristow; Freddie Young
- Edited by: Cecil H. Williamson
- Music by: Percival Mackey
- Production company: British and Dominions
- Distributed by: United Artists
- Release date: July 1934
- Running time: 73 minutes
- Country: United Kingdom
- Language: English

Girls, Please! is a 1934 British comedy film directed by Jack Raymond and starring Sydney Howard, Jane Baxter, Meriel Forbes and Peter Gawthorne. It was written by Michael Hankinson, Bert Lee, Jack Marks, Basil Mason and R. P. Weston, and was made at British and Dominion's Elstree Studios. A physical education teacher at a girls school is left in charge when the headmistress is absent, and has to confront the elopement of one of the pupils.

== Plot ==
Mr Trampleasure, the school's gymnastic instructor, is put in charge when headmistress Miss Prout is called away suddenly. One of the new pupils is Renée van Hoffenheim, who has been brought to the school to keep her from marrying Jim Arundel. Arundel poses as a doctor in order to kidnap Renée, but is thwarted by Trampleasure.

== Cast ==
- Sydney Howard as Mr Trampleasure
- Jane Baxter as Renée van Hoffenheim
- Meriel Forbes as Ann Arundel
- Edward Underdown as Jim Arundel
- Peter Gawthorne as Van Hoffenheim
- Lena Halliday as Miss Prout
- Cicely Oates as Miss Kinter
- Sybil Arundale as Matron
- Moore Marriott as oldest inhabitant
- Neva Carr Glyn

== Reception ==
Kine Weekly wrote: "Farcical comedy with a girls' school background, characteristic Sydney Howard stuff, the well-tried formula being laughably exploited in a slightly new setting. The atmosphere lends itself to frank jests, and these are handled in a manner that scores the laughs with the crowd without giving the slightest offence."

The Daily Film Renter wrote: "Slow in pace, picture is only a fair offering for the masses and Howard fans. ... Developed on naive lines, this picture relies almost entirely on Sydney Howard for its entertainment values. The star is quite funny."

Picture Show wrote: "A rather disappointing comedy ... Sydney Howard as Trampleasure does not appear to reach the high standard which he has done in his other productions. Jane Baxter as Renee van Hoffenheim gives quite an attractive performance. The remainder of the cast work hard."
