= Paddy McGinty's Goat =

Comic song

Single by The Two Bobs
- B-side: "Down at Dooley's Farm"
- Published: 1917
- Released: 1917
- Genre: Music hall
- Label: The Winner
- Songwriters: Bert Lee, R. P. Weston, The Two Bobs

Cover of the sheet music published in 1917 by Francis, Day and Hunter

"Paddy McGinty's Goat" is a comic song written in 1917 by English songwriters Bert Lee and R. P. Weston in collaboration with the American performing duo The Two Bobs (Bob Alden and Bob Adams).

The song was performed in music halls from 1917 by The Two Bobs. It tells the story of an aggressive goat which comes to the village of Killaloe in Ireland and terrorises it by butting its inhabitants and eating everything in sight.

The Irish baritone Mick O'Brian performed it for the cinema in a Pathé News short in 1942. It was recorded by the Irish singer Val Doonican in 1964 on the Decca label as the B-side of "Delaney's Donkey". Although it never made the UK Singles Chart, it came to be associated with the singer and became well known through him. It was recorded by the Ennis Sisters of Canada in 2003.

The 4/4 melody is in D major on the original sheet music, with a D sharp diminished passing chord between the phrases. The second half of each stanza moves to a higher register. It was originally published by Francis, Day & Hunter.

The original 1917 lyrics had verses describing the goat's contribution to World War I, with it chasing submarines off the coast of Ireland and fighting with the Irish Guards on the Western Front.

The plot is somewhat similar to that of "Bill Groggin's Goat", a song that is thought to be based on a Robert Service poem, "The Ballad Of Casey's Billy-Goat" in Bar Room Ballads

The village of Killaloe mentioned in the song is a large village in east County Clare, Ireland. It had a population in 2011 of about 1,300.

The women of the village take to wearing bustles to protect themselves from the goat. A bustle is a type of framework used to expand the fullness or support the drapery of the back of a woman's dress, occurring predominantly in the mid-to-late 19th century.

== Opening lines ==
Mister Patrick McGinty, an Irishman of note,
Came into a fortune, so bought himself a goat.
Said he, "Sure, of goat's milk I mean to have my fill!"
But when he got his Nanny home, he found it was a Bill.

Say, Paddy McGinty's Goat, he had a wondrous appetite.
One Morning for breakfast he ate some dynamite.
A large box of matches, he swallowed the whole serene
and he tried to wash it down with a gallon of gasoline.

He leaned over the fire and he didn't give a dang.
Swallowed a spark and went up with a BANG!
If you ever got to heaven, I bet your dollar note
that the angel with the whiskers on
is Paddy McGinty's Goat!
