= Jack Marks (performer) =

English performer and screenwriter (1895–1987)

Jack Marks (12 February 1895 – 12 March 1987) was an English performer and screenwriter. He was born in Leeds, West Yorkshire, and began his career as a comedian, dancer and singer. He appeared before King George V and Queen Mary at the inaugural Royal Command Performance in London in 1912. He later became a successful screenwriter for several British films, such as Up for the Cup (1950).

Marks married Iris Dilley and they had a son, Howard.

He died from lung cancer in St John's Wood.

== Selected filmography ==
- Splinters in the Navy (1931)
- The Mayor's Nest (1932)
- This Week of Grace (1933)
- It's a King (1933)
- Trouble (1933)
- Up for the Derby (1933)
- It's a Cop (1934)
- Girls, Please! (1934)
- Where's George? (1935)
- Fame (1936)
- Splinters in the Air (1937)
- Why Pick on Me? (1937)
- What a Man! (1938)
- Old Mother Riley Joins Up (1940)
- Old Mother Riley's New Venture (1949)
- Trail Blazers (1953)
- Not Wanted on Voyage (1957)
