= Mr. Proudfoot Shows a Light =

- L–R: Sydney Howard and Wylie Watson
- Directed by: Herbert Mason
- Written by: Sidney Gilliat
- Produced by: Edward Black
- Starring: Sydney Howard; Wylie Watson; Muriel George
- Cinematography: Arthur Crabtree
- Edited by: Alfred Roome
- Production company: 20th Century Fox
- Distributed by: Ministry of Information
- Release date: 1941
- Running time: 7 minutes 45 seconds
- Country: United Kingdom
- Language: English

Mr. Proudfoot Shows a Light is a 1941 British World War II public information/propaganda short film, directed by Herbert Mason and produced by Edward Black for 20th Century Fox. The film had a number of well-known actors of the period, featuring British film and stage actors, Sydney Howard and Wylie Watson.

Mr. Proudfoot Shows a Light was commissioned by the Ministry of Information and was designed to emphasise, in a humorous manner, the need for absolute adherence to wartime blackout regulations. A secondary consideration of the production was to present information in a way that would relieve the stress of civilians coping with nightly bombing raids in the Blitz.

== Plot ==
Mr. Proudfoot (Sydney Howard ) is an attention-seeking bore who subjects his long-suffering wife (Muriel George) and exasperated acquaintances to endless tall tales about narrow escapes from bombs. He also teases the local blackout warden for his ridiculous pettiness when it comes to enforcing blackout restrictions.

One night Mr. Proudfoot invites a friend (Wylie Watson) over for a late night game of billiards, but is careless about his blackout. After moving the blackout screen over to let in some air, the light showing from his home provides a target for a stray German bomber. The German crew had been struggling with inclement weather and were unable to get their bearings until they see the light below, which, after some calculations, indicates they are over London.

Having unloaded a bomb over Mr. Proudfoot's district, and even hitting his house with calamitous results, the Luftwaffe bomber is shot down by RAF Hawker Hurricane fighters. Under interrogation, one of the German crew states that they were guided to their target by a light blazing from a property that allowed them to plot out an attack.

Despite his injuries, Mr. Proudfoot appears at his local pub bandaged and bruised, but is still boasting to anyone who will listen about his latest brush with death.

== Cast ==
- Sydney Howard as Mr. Proudfoot
- Muriel George as Mrs. Proudfoot
- Wylie Watson as Friend
- Irene Handl as Councillor
- Noel Dainton as Warden
- Aubrey Mallalieu as Chairman
- Percy Walsh as Officer
- Albert Lieven as German
- Michael Wilding as RAF Officer

== Production ==
Filming for Mr. Proudfoot Shows a Light took place in Shepherd's Bush Studios. The film includes a studio set scene of a Luftwaffe base and the interiors of aircraft cockpits, alongside authentic newsreel footage of an aerial dogfight and a downed aircraft. (Note: The "Jolly Anglers" pub at 314–316 Kennetside, Reading, London, was featured in location shots.)
