= Ernest Hastings =

English pianist & singer (1879–1940)

- Born: Ernest Walter Hastings; 15 June 1879; Manchester, England
- Died: 2 September 1940 (aged 61); Willesden, Middlesex, England
- Occupation: Music hall entertainer
- Years active: c.1899–1940

Ernest Walter Hastings (15 June 1879 – 2 September 1940) was an English singer, pianist, composer and performer of comic monologues. He was popular from the 1900s to the 1930s, when he was described as "England's Greatest Entertainer at the Piano".

== Biography ==
He was born in Manchester in 1879, and at first found work as a shipping clerk. He also played piano, and developed a talent for mimicry and monologues which led him to a theatrical career in music halls before 1900. He became popular, and toured in the United States as well as in Britain. His early successes included "The Commissionaire" (1899, with lyrics by Charles H. Taylor), "A Blooming Ballad" (with lyricist Astley Weaver, 1901), "The Three Ages of Man" (with lyrics by Nelson Jackson, 1909), and "The Emigrant's Letter" (with lyrics by Percy French, 1912).

In the First World War, he performed songs both in support of recruitment, such as "We're All Plain Civilians" (with lyrics by Foden Williams, 1914), and critical of the apparent impossibility of escaping conscription, in songs such as "Exemptions and Otherwise" and "The Military Representative", written by R. P. Weston and Bert Lee (1916), in which the military recruitment tribunal approves for active service "a series of ever more unsuitable candidates". The song was very well received, with lyrics such as: "How dare your husband die!/ He was A1 in July/ What say ma'am? He's in heaven now?/ Well you just let him know/ I'm sending a Sergeant to fetch him back/ For of course he's got to go!". His other songs and monologues included "The Bolshevik" (written by Lee and Weston, 1919), and "Seaside Posters Round the Home" (by Edgar Bateman and Henry E. Pether, 1919).

From 1914 until 1929, he made recordings for the Columbia and His Master's Voice record labels. These included "A Soldier's Reminiscences" (with lyrics by Bert Lee, 1914); the earliest recording of Lee and Weston's song "My Word, You Do Look Queer" (1922, later popularised by Stanley Holloway); and the tribute to Woolworth's stores, "There's Nothing Over Sixpence in the Store" (with lyrics by Frank S Wilcock, 1927), "In My Young Days" (with lyrics by Percy Beck, 1930), and "The Nut Brown Ale of England" (with lyrics by Percy Beck, 1931). Hastings appeared in the 1919 Royal Variety Performance, and toured the vaudeville circuit in Australia in 1925 with J. Milton Hayes. He also made BBC radio broadcasts in the late 1920s.

Hastings died in Willesden, London, in 1940, aged 61. A compilation of his recordings, The Seaside Posters, was issued on CD in 2018.
