= Fame (1936 film) =

- Muriel Aked and Sydney Howard in the film.
- Directed by: Leslie S. Hiscott
- Written by: Michael Barringer; Bert Lee; Jack Marks; R. P. Weston
- Produced by: Herbert Wilcox
- Starring: Sydney Howard; Muriel Aked; Miki Hood
- Cinematography: Freddie Young
- Music by: Geraldo
- Production company: Herbert Wilcox Productions
- Distributed by: General Film Distributors
- Release date: 12 March 1936
- Running time: 68 minutes
- Country: United Kingdom
- Language: English

Fame is a 1936 British comedy film directed by Leslie S. Hiscott and starring Sydney Howard, Muriel Aked and Miki Hood. It was made at Elstree Studios.

It was the second film from Herbert Wilcox Productions.

== Preservation status ==
The British Film Institute National Archive holds a collection of ephemera and stills but no film or video materials.

== Plot ==
Oswald Bertwhistle wins a newspaper competition, with the prize of playing the part of Oliver Cromwell in a film. On the way to the London studios he meets an escaped convict. On the film set, it is clear to everyone – except Oswald – that he has no acting abilities whatsoever.

== Cast ==
- Sydney Howard as Oswald Bertwhistle
- Muriel Aked as Mrs. Bertwhistle
- Miki Hood as Joan Riley
- Brian Lawrance as Douglas Cameron
- Guy Middleton as Lester Cordwell
- Geraldine Hislop as Geraldine
- Arthur Finn as film director
- H. F. Maltby as mayor
- Herbert Lomas as Rumbold Wakefield
- Russell Thorndike as Judge
- Frank Pettingell as Reuben Pendleton
- Sydney Fairbrother as train passenger
- Maire O'Neill as Mrs Docker
- Henry Victor as actor
- Frederick Piper as press representative

== Reception ==
The Monthly Film Bulletin wrote: " This light-hearted story gives Sydney Howard ample scope for the display of his individual type of humour. In the opening scenes as the inefficient shopwalker quoting Shakespeare at astonished and indignant customers he is extremely funny, and his burlesque attempts to portray Cromwell are no less amusing. Some other scenes are less successful. ... He is supported by a thoroughly efficient cast, and the result is pleasant, light entertainment."

Kine Weekly wrote: "Unpretentious comedy burlesque built to frame the amiable clowning of Jay Howard. The story, that of a simpleton's unsuccessful quest for screen fame, can claim few marks for originality, but the task of invisibly mending threadbare gags is so disarmingly accomplished by the resourcefulness of the star that few, if any, of his admirers will consider that they have had less than their money's worth. There is no serious shortage of laughs, nor are the technical qualities below par."
