= Where's George? (film) =

- Directed by: Jack Raymond
- Written by: Bert Lee; Jack Marks; R.P. Weston
- Produced by: Herbert Wilcox
- Starring: Sydney Howard; Mabel Constanduros; Frank Pettingell
- Production company: British and Dominions
- Distributed by: United Artists
- Release date: 19 August 1935
- Running time: 70 minutes
- Country: United Kingdom
- Language: English

Where's George? (also known as The Hope of His Side) is a 1935 British comedy film directed by Jack Raymond and starring Sydney Howard and Mabel Constanduros. It was written by Bert Lee, Jack Marks and R.P. Weston.

The film went on general release in late 1935 but just a few weeks later, in January 1936, King George V died. The film was consequently renamed Hope of His Side as posters asking "Where's George?" were not considered appropriate.

== Preservation status ==
The British Film Institute National Archive holds a collection of ephemera but no film or video materials.

== Plot ==
Hen-pecked blacksmith Alf Scodger is always trying to fool his overbearing wife. As a result of these attempts, he accidentally discovers that he has a talent for rugby league and is picked to play for his local Yorcaster club against their rivals Oldcastle from Lancashire.

"George" is a foal that Alf buys and then loses. While playing in the rugby match, Alf spots George in the next field and whilst running to recapture the foal, catches the ball and scores the match-winning try. A local dignitary watching the match sees him score the try and this leads to Alf and his wife becoming reconciled.

== Cast ==
- Sydney Howard as Alf Scodger
- Mabel Constanduros as Mrs Scodger
- Leslie Sarony as Willy Yates
- Frank Pettingell as Harry Swan
- Sam Livesey as Sir Richard Lancaster
- Wally Patch as Ted Sloane

== Shooting ==
In the summer of 1935, crowd scenes were filmed in the mining village Featherstone in the West Riding of Yorkshire. Two hundred unemployed coal miners were hired as extras. Players from Featherstone Rovers and Huddersfield were used in the rugby scenes.

== Reception ==
The Monthly Film Bulletin wrote: "The interesting ideas clearly latent in Walter Greenwood's scenario have been travestied on their way to the screen, miscasting of the characters and jocular direction conspiring together to turn into farce what has the makings of good comedy-drama."

The Daily Film Renter wrote: "Apart from the characteristic drolleries of Sydney Howard, this picture is quite frankly a flimsy affair. Direction, dialogue and presentation are no more than passable."

Kine Weekly wrote: "The plot means very little, all the gags are old, but the quaint comicalities and homely versatility of Sydney Howard, comfortably cast as a henpecked husband, ceaselessly battling with his inferiority complex, keeps somnolence from the unhurried, artless entertainment. The staging is fairly good, but the treatment is loose, and the support barely adequate."

Writing for The Spectator, Graham Greene described the film as "badly acted and carelessly directed", opining that even an actor like Howard could "do very little with the [film's] stale gags" and that the portrayal of Alf Scodger was one of "devastating pathos".
