= Harold Berens =

British comedian and character actor (1903–1995)

- Born: Isadore Harold Berenbaum; 4 March 1903; Glasgow, Scotland
- Died: 10 May 1995 (aged 92); London, England
- Occupations: Comedian, character actor

Harold Berens (born Isadore Harold Berenbaum; 4 March 1903 – 10 May 1995) was a British comedian and character actor.

== Biography ==
He was born into a Jewish family in Glasgow, the son of a tailor, and grew up and was educated in Leeds, Harrogate, and Brussels. After his father built up a successful business in Brighton, he moved there, and began performing at show business parties organised by his father. After completing his education he worked as a shirt salesman, primarily to a show business clientele, while developing his own talent for comedy, especially his ability to imitate a wide range of different dialects, at private functions. In the 1930s he opened his own shop in Regent Street, London, where he styled himself as "Shirtmaker to the Stars". One of his customers was Carroll Levis, who thought that Berens was too professional a performer to perform in his regular amateur talent shows, and recommended that he audition for the BBC.

He won the support of BBC radio producer Ernest Longstaffe, who used him in radio programmes from the late 1930s and wrote some of his scripts. Berens compered broadcasts by Maurice Winnick and his orchestra from the Dorchester Hotel, and then, in 1939, started compering shows by Jay Wilbur and his band for Radio Luxembourg. During the Second World War, he made regular broadcasts for the services, and by 1941 was well known for his comedy routines, in which one of his characters was Mrs Twiddleswitch. He became known as "The Man with a Thousand Voices."

He featured regularly in the radio series Hoop-La, with Robb Wilton and Max Wall, and became more popular after 1945 playing the role of a Cockney ignoramus on Ignorance Is Bliss, chaired by Stewart MacPherson, which was a BBC adaptation of the American show It Pays to Be Ignorant. According to Roy Hudd, Berens' exclamations of "What a Geezer!" became a national catchphrase. By 1947, it was said that he had done over 2,000 radio broadcasts. He also appeared in four Royal Variety Performances.

He continued to feature on radio through the 1950s, notably as Mrs Mosseltoff on the show Ted Ray Time. He also developed a career as a supporting actor in films and television. His first film appearance was in Candlelight in Algeria (1944), followed by appearances in Third Time Lucky (1949), Up for the Cup (1950), Man from Tangier (1957), and The Pure Hell of St Trinian's (1960), among others. He also appeared in such television shows as The Avengers and It's a Square World. His final film appearances came in Trail of the Pink Panther (1982), Hear My Song (1991), and Carry On Columbus (1992).

Berens died in London in 1995, aged 92.

== Filmography ==
Year	Title	Role	Notes
1944	Candlelight in Algeria	Toni	
1945	The Man from Morocco	Ali	
1947	Dual Alibi	Ali	
1949	Third Time Lucky	Young Waiter	
1950	Up for the Cup	Auctioneer	
1955	A Kid for Two Farthings	Oliver	
1955	The Secret	Frank Farmer	
1956	Not So Dusty	Driver	
1956	The Big Money	Bookmaker	
1957	Man from Tangier	Sammy	
1960	Jazz Boat	Barber Shop Owner	Uncredited
1960	Bluebeard's Ten Honeymoons	Jeweller	Uncredited
1960	Surprise Package	Max Schissel	Uncredited
1960	The Pure Hell of St Trinian's	British Consul	
1961	A Weekend with Lulu	Card Seller	
1961	What a Whopper	Sammy	
1962	The Painted Smile	Mikhala	
1962	Live Now – Pay Later	Solly Cowell	
1964	Mozambique	Banker	
1969	Hostile Witness	Rosen	
1969	The Magic Christian	Waiter	Uncredited
1972	Straight On till Morning	Mr. Harris	
1976	Queen Kong	Man in Phone Booth	Uncredited
1976	The Pink Panther Strikes Again	Hotel Clerk	(scenes deleted)
1982	Trail of the Pink Panther	Hotel Clerk	
1991	Hear My Song	Benny Rose	
1992	Carry On Columbus	Cecil the Torturer	(final film role)
