= It's a King =

1933 film

- French poster
- Directed by: Jack Raymond
- Written by: Paul England; Claude Hulbert; Bert Lee; Jack Marks; R. P. Weston
- Produced by: Herbert Wilcox
- Starring: Sydney Howard; Joan Maude; Cecil Humphreys
- Cinematography: Cyril Bristow; Freddie Young
- Music by: Lew Stone; Harris Weston
- Production company: British and Dominions
- Distributed by: Woolf & Freedman Film Service
- Release date: 1933
- Running time: 68 minutes
- Country: United Kingdom
- Language: English

It's a King (also known as Herbert, Roi Malgré Lui) is a 1933 British comedy film directed by Jack Raymond and starring Sydney Howard, Joan Maude and Cecil Humphreys. It was written by Paul England, Claude Hulbert, Bert Lee, Jack Marks and R. P. Weston, and made at Elstree Studios by the producer Herbert Wilcox's British and Dominions company.

== Plot ==
Farce in which insurance agent Albert King is discovered to be the exact double of the king of Helgia, and even has his name in reverse (King Albert). Insurance man Albert enjoys a romance with a princess, before finally saving the King from assassination by anarchists.

== Cast ==
- Sydney Howard as Albert King / King Albert
- Joan Maude as Princess Yasma
- Cecil Humphreys as Count Yendoff
- George De Warfaz as Colonel Brandt
- Arthur Goullet as Leader
- Franklyn Bellamy as Salvatore
- Bela Berkes as himself
- Lew Stone as himself

== Reception ==
Film Weekly wrote: "Easy-going comedy, full of rather naive humour. Amusing – of its type."

Kine Weekly wrote: "Riotous, irresponsitle Ruritanian nonsense, put over in a big way. The story is bright, and has been embellished with new gags and touches of light satire, and its clean, sefreshing, artless humour is interpreted with irresistible effect by Sydney Howard, who is immense in a dual role. The director, Jack Raymond, has spared neither brains nor expense to make the film a winner, and its box-office success is never in question. Excellent comedy attraction."

Picturegoer wrote: "This is Sydney Howard's best to date, a riot of Ruritanian ridiculousness. The gags are good and there is more than a touch of satire in the proceedings."

Variety wrote: "[Howard's] methods are slow and ponderous, giving to all his characterizations the impression of a man half stewed. It's funny on the stage, although a trifle monotonous. In the picture it lacks speed, and footage needs editing. An apparently generous amount was spent on costuming and settings, but there was a paucity of investment in the supporting cast. While having no world-wide appeal, It's a King should do well in the British Isles."
