= Trouble (1933 film) =

- Trade advertisement
- Directed by: Maclean Rogers
- Written by: Bert Lee; Jack Marks; Dudley Sturrock; Walter Tennyson; R. P. Weston
- Produced by: Herbert Wilcox
- Starring: Sydney Howard; George Curzon; Muriel Aked
- Cinematography: Freddie Young
- Music by: Harris Weston
- Production company: British and Dominions
- Distributed by: United Artists
- Release date: November 1933
- Running time: 70 minutes
- Country: United Kingdom
- Language: English

Trouble is a 1933 British comedy film directed by Maclean Rogers and starring Sydney Howard, George Curzon and Dorothy Robinson. It was written by Bert Lee, Jack Marks, Dudley Sturrock, Walter Tennyson and R. P. Weston, and was made at British and Dominion Elstree Studios.

== Preservation status ==
The British Film Institute National Archive holds a collection of stills but no film or video materials.

== Premise ==
Horace Hollobone and his friend Nobby Clarke are stewards on a cruise ship, and suspect Captain Vansittart and his sister of the theft of a lady's jewellery. When the ship docks at Tangier, they retrieve the stolen goods, but they run into trouble when they try to return to the ship and claim the reward.

== Cast ==
- Sydney Howard as Horace Hollebone
- George Curzon as Captain Vansittart
- Dorothy Robinson as Cora Vansittart
- Hope Davy as Miss Carruthers
- Muriel Aked as Miss May
- George Turner as Nobby Clarke
- Wally Patch as Chief Steward
- Betty Shale as Mrs Orpington
- Abraham Sofaer as Al

== Reception ==
Kine Weekly wrote: "Happy, carefree comedy, exceptionally well staged, and clean and refreshing in its humour. The story is a tritle obvious, and the gags are not entirely new, but the method of their presentation is such that the film delivers a full quota of laughs. Sydney Howard is in his best inimitable form, and a host of well known comedy players contribute capital support."

The Daily Film Renter wrote: "Bright direction presents story in slow but workmanlike manner, although star's comicalities are mainstay of picture. ...As a vehicle for the star it is quite successful, and all that most people will care about is whether Sydney is well in evidence most of the time. They can be reassured on this point – he is seldom absent from the limelight."
