= Adam's Apple (film) =

1928 British silent film by Tim Whelan

- Directed by: Tim Whelan
- Written by: Rex Taylor; Tim Whelan
- Starring: Monty Banks; Gillian Dean; Lena Halliday; Judy Kelly
- Cinematography: René Guissart; George Pocknall
- Production company: British International Pictures
- Distributed by: Wardour Films
- Release date: 3 September 1928
- Running time: 85 minutes
- Country: United Kingdom
- Language: English

Adam's Apple is a 1928 British silent comedy film directed by Tim Whelan, in his directorial debut. It starred Monty Banks, Lena Halliday and Judy Kelly. It was made by British International Pictures at their Elstree Studios.

== Premise ==
An American on his honeymoon in Paris, organises the kidnapping of his interfering mother-in-law.

== Cast ==
- Monty Banks as Monty Adams
- Gillian Dean as Ruth Appleby
- Lena Halliday as Mrs. Appleby
- Judy Kelly as Vamp
- Colin Kenny as Husband
- Dino Galvani as Crook
- Hal Gordon as Drunk
- Charles O'Shaughnessy as Official

== Bibliography ==
- Low, Rachael. History of the British Film, 1918-1929. George Allen & Unwin, 1971.
- Wood, Linda. British Films 1927-1939. British Film Institute, 1986.
