= Up for the Cup (1931 film) =

1931 film

- Trade show advertisement
- Directed by: Jack Raymond
- Written by: Bert Lee; Con West; R. P. Weston
- Produced by: Herbert Wilcox
- Starring: Sydney Howard; Joan Wyndham; Stanley Kirk; Moore Marriott
- Cinematography: Freddie Young
- Production companies: Herbert Wilcox Productions; British & Dominions Film Corporation
- Distributed by: Woolf & Freedman Film Service
- Release date: 14 September 1931
- Running time: 76 minutes
- Country: United Kingdom
- Language: English

Up for the Cup is a 1931 British comedy film directed by Jack Raymond and starring Sydney Howard, Joan Wyndham, Stanley Kirk and Moore Marriott. The screenplay, by Bert Lee, Con West and R. P. Weston concerns a man who comes to London to watch the FA Cup final.

The film was remade in 1950, again directed by Jack Raymond.

== Premise ==
A Yorkshireman comes to London to watch the FA Cup final and loses his money and tickets, leading to a frantic search to recover them.

== Cast ==
- Sydney Howard as John Willie Entwhistle
- Joan Wyndham as Mary Murgatroyd
- Stanley Kirk as Cyril Hardcastle
- Sam Livesey as John Cartwright
- Marie Wright as Mrs Entwhistle
- Moore Marriott as James Hardcastle
- Hal Gordon as proprietor
- Herbert Woodward as Tom
- Jack Raymond as railway clerk

== Critical reception ==
Kine Weekly wrote: "This simple, refreshing comedy has a very slight story, but the quaint, inimitable and typically English humour of Sydney Howard, who is in irresistible form, carries it along at an easy gait and invests it with a definite mass appeal. The production and detail work are satisfactory, and there are many bright and original gags. The picture is thoroughly English in conception, sentiment and humour, and represents good popular entertainment. "

Film Weekly wrote: "British and Dominions can be commended for starring Sydney Howard, of the funny face and the expressive hands, in a full-length comedy of his own. They also deserve a word of praise for choosing typically British settings and backgrounds. But although they have produced a pleasantly amusing film, one is compelled to ask why they did not give it the benefit of a better story. According to the synopsis, it took three authors to write Up for the Cup, but the resulting narrative is so naive as to leave some doubt whether or not it is intended to be taken more or less seriously. If it is supposed to be all a huge joke, then the treatment is at fault in allowing some of the scenes to verge on melodrama. ... The atmosphere of a Lancashire town, and of London on Cup Final day is faithfull reproduced, with the result that Up for the Cup is British to the backbone. Good entertainment of its kind."

TV Guide called it "a pleasant comedy."
