= Worton David =

English songwriter and music publisher

- Born: Ernest Worton David; 17 October 1872; Rawmarsh, West Riding of Yorkshire, England
- Died: 15 November 1940 (aged 68); Worthing, Sussex, England
- Occupation: Songwriter
- Years active: c.1890s–1940

Ernest Worton David (17 October 1872 – 15 November 1940) was an English songwriter and music publisher.

== Biography ==
Worton David was born in Rawmarsh, near Rotherham in the West Riding of Yorkshire; Worton was his mother's maiden name. At first he worked in a solicitor's office, but wrote stories and soon joined the staff of the Leeds Mercury newspaper. He was also a cartoonist, and one of his jobs was to draw caricatures of performers at the Leeds Empire theatre. He started to write songs, and persuaded some of the performers he met to use them. As a result, he then decided to try his luck as a songwriter in London.

His first successful song, "Bobbing Up and Down Like This", was published in 1899. By 1909, he had teamed up with composer George Arthurs. In 1910 they wrote the successful parody "I want to sing in opera". In 1912 they wrote "Piccadilly Trot", with the then-fashionable ragtime rhythm, for Marie Lloyd; and, the following year, "Hold Your Hand Out, Naughty Boy!" for Florrie Forde. He also had one of his biggest and longest-lasting successes in 1913, with "Hello! Hello! Who's Your Lady Friend?" written with Bert Lee and Harry Fragson, and performed by Fragson, Mark Sheridan, and many others.

In 1914, he began working with composer and music publisher Lawrence Wright, producing the popular marching song "Are We Downhearted? No!" (1914) and "That Old-Fashioned Mother of Mine" (1919), which became the signature song of Talbot O'Farrell. He also co-founded the Performing Right Society in 1914. However, his partnership with Wright ended when David objected to Wright's copious use of American songs, and Wright bought out David's share of the songs they had written together.

After severing his ties with Wright, David started his own publishing firm in the 1920s, and unlike many songwriters became financially successful. He signed up established songwriters Fred Godfrey and Harry Castling, as well as his own son, Hubert W. "Micky" David (1904-1999), who also became a successful composer; he wrote the hit song "Felix Kept On Walking", was associated with Twickenham Studios, and wrote the theme music to BBC TV's Come Dancing.

Worton David died in Worthing, Sussex, in 1940, aged 68.
