= What a Man! (1938 film) =

- Feature from Picturegoer (1 December 1937)
- Directed by: Edmond T. Gréville
- Written by: Jack Marks; Basil Mason
- Produced by: Hugh Perceval
- Starring: Sydney Howard; Vera Pearce; John Singer
- Cinematography: Ernest Palmer
- Edited by: Ray Pitt
- Music by: Walter Goehr
- Production company: Independent Film Producers
- Distributed by: British Lion
- Release date: December 1938
- Running time: 74 minutes
- Country: United Kingdom
- Language: English

What a Man! is a lost 1938 British comedy film directed by Edmond T. Gréville and starring Sydney Howard, Vera Pearce and John Singer. It was written by Jack Marks and Basil Mason and made at Beaconsfield Studios. The art direction was by Norman G. Arnold.

== Preservation status ==
The British Film Institute has classed What a Man! as a lost film. Its National Archive holds no ephemera, still, film or video materials.

== Plot ==
Samuel Pennyfeather is a village photographer, scoutmaster and secretary of the local "slate club" (a community savings scheme) who is unhappy that his daughter Daisy is engaged to Walter Walkeling, a builder with plans to put houses on local common land. Samuel is always in one fix or another; he manages to upset the local bigwigs, and lose the slate club's funds. Somehow he finds an ancient charter which guarantees the sanctity of the land, and also gets elected mayor.

== Cast ==
- Sydney Howard as Samuel Pennyfeather
- Vera Pearce as Emily Pennyfeather
- John Singer as Harold Bull
- H. F. Maltby as Sergeant Bull
- Ivor Barnard as Mayor
- Jenny Laird as Daisy Pennyfeather
- Robert Adair as Lord Bromwich
- Frederick Bradshaw as Walter Walkeling
- Frank Cochrane as Simpkins
- Francesca Bahrle
- Sybil Grove
- Alfred Wellesley

== Reception ==
The Monthly Film Bulletin wrote: "Essentially a vehicle for Sydney Howard, it portrays the whimsicalities which brought him stage success, including his famous female impersonation. Vera Pearce and H. F. Maltby support him loyally, while young John Singer turns in a good performance as a young troop-leader Harold. A rollicking romp which should delight Howard fans but which is too reminiscent of a stage show to rate as a first-rate film."

The Daily Film Renter wrote: "Sydney Howard comedy presenting funster as Scoutmaster wrongfully accused of embezzling slate-club funds. Star puts over well-known eccentricities, including female masquerade, but plot is feeble, and much of the humour appears forced. Naive offering of broad type, with primary appeal for Howard's following, but not up to the comedian's usual standard."

Kine Weekly wrote: "Wildly irresponsible urban frolic designed principally to exploit the bland humour of Sydney Howard. He does practically everything, and is hided in his urbane versatility by a more than adequate supporting team. Production work is good. It is, however, the ingenuousness of the humour that does the trick; it disarms criticism and, at the same time, creates popular and family appeal. ... Sydney Howard is Sam, and he is seen as Scoutmaster, inebriate female impersonator and Chinese conjurer. The gamut is familiar, but he puts it over yet again. ... We will not pretend there is anything new in this, but it does make the most of time-honoured gags and situations."

Picturegoer wrote: "Sydney Howard exploits his brand of bland humour in this ingenuous farce which, while it can hardly claim to be novel, exploits old gags with a good modicum of success."

Picture Show wrote: "Sydney Howard gives a typical performance in this village comedy as a photographer who gets himself into all kinds of trouble, but emerges triumphant at the end. ... The star carries most of the entertainment, but the supporting cast is efficient."
