= Ernie Mayne =

English music hall entertainer

Percy Ernest Barratt (17 March 1871 – 15 May 1937) was an English music hall entertainer who performed under the name Ernie Mayne. Mayne was one of the first music hall stars to broadcast on radio in 1922.

Born in Topsham, Devon, by the age of ten he was living in London's Soho. He weighed about 20 st (280 lb; 130 kg) and sang comic songs such as "Fried Fruit Fritters" about his weight. Mayne first gained interest in comedy when people laughed at him for wanting to be an airman, because of his weight. One of his songs, "What D'yer Think of That" was later remade as Lonnie Donegan's song "My Old Man's a Dustman". He also made an early recording of the song "Proper Cup of Coffee".

His song "An N'Egg and Some N'Ham and Some N'Onion" featured in the early career of entertainer Tessie O'Shea.

Mayne died in 1937, in Brighton, at the age of 66.
