= These Foolish Things (revue) =

1938 British revue

These Foolish Things was a British revue show. First staged on 12 September 1938 at the Hippodrome in Brighton, it enjoyed a lengthy West End stage run at the London Palladium from 28 September 1938 to 3 June 1939, encompassing a total 489 performances. Featuring in the line-up were The Crazy Gang along with the Sherman Fisher Girls. The show was produced and directed by George Black, who also co-wrote it along with Bert Lee and Harris Weston.

== Bibliography ==
- Wearing, J.P. The London Stage 1930-1939: A Calendar of Productions, Performers, and Personnel. Rowman & Littlefield, 2014.
