= With Her Head Tucked Underneath Her Arm =

1934 novety song performed by Stanley Holloway

Song
- Written: 1934
- Published: 1934
- Composer: Harris Weston
- Lyricists: R. P. Weston & Bert Lee

"With Her Head Tucked Underneath Her Arm" is a darkly humorous song, written in 1934 with lyrics by R. P. Weston and Bert Lee and music by Harris Weston. It was originally performed by Stanley Holloway. It tells of how the ghost of Anne Boleyn haunts the Tower of London, seeking revenge on Henry VIII for having her beheaded.

It has been covered by many performers, including:

- British actor Cyril Smith in 1934.
- Roy Barbour in 1934 on Rex Records 8342 A, a 78 rpm release, with The Lion and Albert on the B side
- Rudy Vallee in the late 1930s with "The Old Sow Song" on the reverse.
- The Kingston Trio on their 1960 album Sold Out.
- The Barron Knights in 1966.
- Caryl P. Weiss, whose 1981 recording has been a mainstay on Dr. Demento's Halloween show.
- Bobby Clancy, who recorded it twice under the title "Anne Boleyn," once with The Clancy Brothers on their 1982 Live album, and again on his 2000 solo album, Make Me a Cup.

== In media ==
It has appeared in many shows, including:

- The song was used in the serial Spin and Marty on the Mickey Mouse Club TV show in the late 1950s.
- During the episode "Whine Club" of the TV series Frasier, Daphne Moon sings the song due to the fact that she was drunk on a Bloody Mary cocktail.
- During the episode "They do it with Mirrors" of the TV series Marple. The convicts sing together an excerpt of the song before the theater play.

It was referenced in the novel, Murder, She Wrote: A Question of Murder, and in the children's novel, Otherwise Known as Sheila the Great by Judy Blume.
