= My Word, You Do Look Queer =

English popular song 1922

Song by Ernest Hastings
- A-side: "Gerrard 64"
- Released: 1922
- Genre: Music hall; monologue
- Label: His Master's Voice
- Songwriters: Bert Lee; R. P. Weston

"My Word, You Do Look Queer" is a comic monologue written by Bert Lee and R. P. Weston. It was first performed and recorded in 1922 by English entertainer Ernest Hastings, and revived by Stanley Holloway who recorded it in 1938 and again in 1959.

== Lyrics ==
The song tells of a man recovering from illness, but feeling better. Yet his friends insist on telling him, one after the other, that he looks "queer" (that is, strange or different). He comes to believe that he must indeed be close to death, but revives after a visit to an undertaker's.
