= Let's All Go Down the Strand =

British song

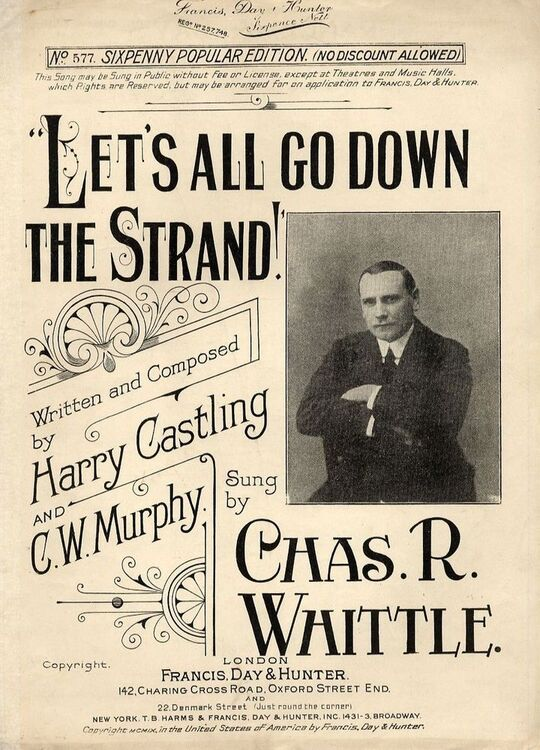
1909 sheet music, published in the United States

"Let's All Go Down the Strand" is a popular British music hall song of the late 19th and early 20th centuries, written by Harry Castling and C. W. Murphy. It was first performed by Castling, and was published in 1909. It was inspired by the Strand, a street in Westminster, Central London, that in the late 19th century became a centre for theatres, hotels and music halls. The song has three verses describing people trying to persuade others to abandon their current plans to "go down the Strand". The first verse is about a group of tourists planning a trip to Germany, the second about prisoners in jail and the third about sailors returning with Ernest Shackleton from a polar expedition. The song was popular with British soldiers in the First World War. A refrain of "have a banana", not included in the published lyrics, was often interposed after the first line of the chorus. Sometimes "Gertie Gitana" was sung instead, leading to the use of "Gertie" as rhyming slang for the fruit. A version was released by rock band Blur in 1993.

== Song ==
The song is inspired by the Strand, a street in Westminster, Central London. During the late 19th century the Strand was transformed from a refuge for beggars, gamblers and fraudsters to a respectable leisure venue with theatres, hotels and music halls.

It was written by music hall performer Harry Castling and composer Charles William Murphy. The song was first sung by Castling in the 1890s. According to music hall historian Richard Anthony Baker, the song developed after Castling and Murphy left the Lyceum Theatre together, and headed towards Waterloo Bridge when Castling suggested "Let's go down the Strand". He later maintained that, as soon as he said the words, he realised it would make a good song title. Adding the word "all", they wrote the song, with Castling later saying that "both the words and the music came to us as though we had been singing them all our lives."

The lyrics of the 1909 version describe a group of six tourists meeting in Trafalgar Square for a planned trip to continental Europe. One of them, Jones, advises the others to "stay away from Germany, what's the good of going down the Rhine?" and in the chorus tries to persuade them to stay in London: "let's all go down the Strand" as "that's the place for fun and noise, all among the girls and boys". The second verse describes a group of 25 prisoners confined in prison and ordered to exercise; one, Burglar Ben, proposes to their warden that they instead visit the Strand. The third and final verse describes the Lord Mayor of London welcoming back an Ernest Shackleton expedition to "the Pole" (Shackleton had taken part in the 1901–04 Discovery Expedition and led the 1907–09 Nimrod Expedition, both in the Antarctic but never reached the South Pole). The Lord Mayor proposes that he throws a banquet at Mansion House but one of Shackleton's sailors asks the explorer if they can instead "go down the Strand".

== Impact ==
The refrain "have a banana!", sung after the first line of the chorus, is a later addition to the song, though it is known to have been sung in the 1890s. The origins of the refrain are unknown, though it helped to drive sales of the fruit. Sometimes "Gertie Gitana" (a music hall entertainer) was substituted for the refrain, leading to "Gertie" becoming Cockney rhyming slang for banana the usage of which continues to the modern day. The ten-note "have a banana" theme from the chorus was used by Ralph Vaughan Williams in the first movement of his A London Symphony.

The phrase "let's all go down the Strand", particularly to mean making a visit to the theatres there, became a popular phrase among the British working class. The song, and in particular its chorus, was popular with Londoners. "Let's All Go Down the Strand" was popular with British soldiers in the First World War, alongside other music hall favourites such as "It's a Long Way to Tipperary" and Charles Whittle's "We All Go The Same Way Home". The men of a London battalion are recorded as having sung it when up to their knees in mud near Ypres in 1917.

The song was a music hall hit for Charles Whittle, and for Harry Fay in 1910. It gave Whittle his first major success and became one of his most popular songs, though in later life he grew to hate the song as it was requested so often. John Betjeman used the title of the song for a television documentary made for Associated-Rediffusion in 1967. The same year, Margaret Williams used it for a stage comedy. The English rock band Blur recorded a cover of "Let's All Go Down the Strand" that was released as the B-side of one format of their 1993 EP "Sunday Sunday".
