= Charles Whittle (entertainer) =

Charles Richard Whittle (14 August 1874 – 27 November 1947) was an English music hall singer and one of the last lions comiques.

He was born in Manningham, Bradford, and worked in an ironworks before taking to the stage. After finding success at home in Yorkshire, he moved to London and became successful with songs such as "We All Go the Same Way Home", and "Let’s All Go Down the Strand" - both written by Harry Castling and C. W. Murphy - and "Billy Muggins", written by Charles Ridgwell and popular among soldiers in the First World War. Historian W. J. MacQueen-Pope wrote that Whittle was "the sort of man everyone knew, the real sort of man to be a star of that entertainment which was for the people, of the people and by the people. His mastery of an audience was complete; all felt he was their friend, all knew him the moment he walked on. He knew all about singing songs, he had some of the best to sing and he sang them quietly but with all the proper emphasis."

Though Whittle recorded some songs for Zonophone Records in 1913, they were not released. He continued to perform into the 1920s, but then retired before making a brief comeback in 1938. He died in Bradford in 1947, aged 73.
