= Lena Halliday =

English actress (1872–1937)

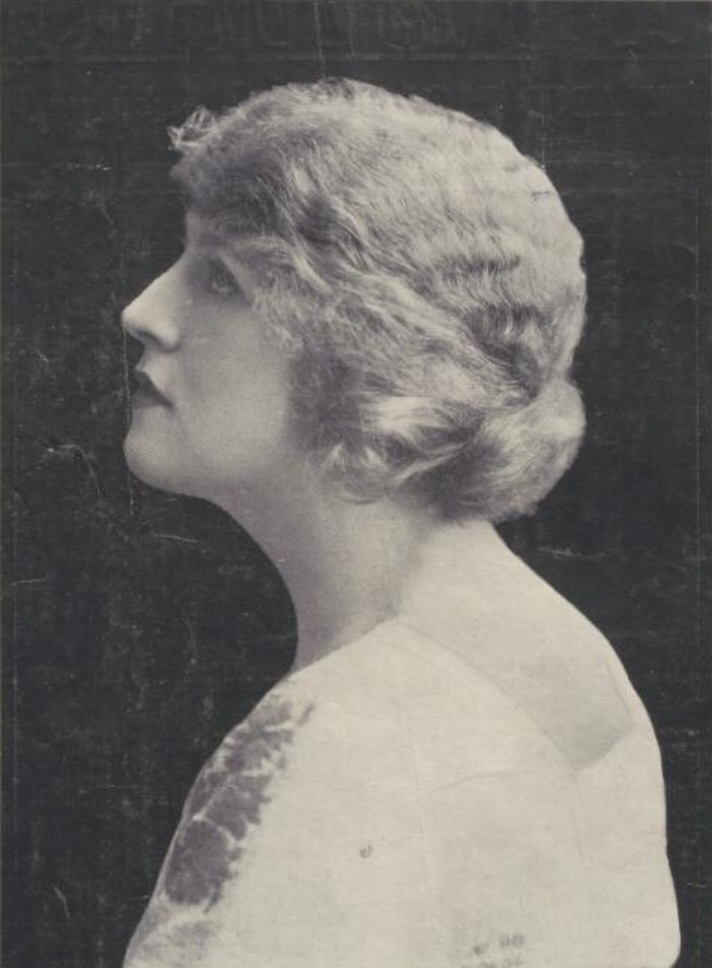
Lena Halliday in the 1920s

Lena Halliday (1872 – 19 December 1937) was an English stage and film actress.

She as born Selina Heinekey in Balham, London, UK and died in Battersea, London, UK.

== Death ==
Lena Halliday died on 19 December 1937 in Battersea, London, at the age of 65.

== Selected filmography ==
- Motherland (1927)
- Adam's Apple (1928)
- Sir or Madam (1928)
- When Knights Were Bold (1929)
- Inquest (1931)
- Girls, Please! (1934)
