= Hello! Hello! Who's Your Lady Friend? =

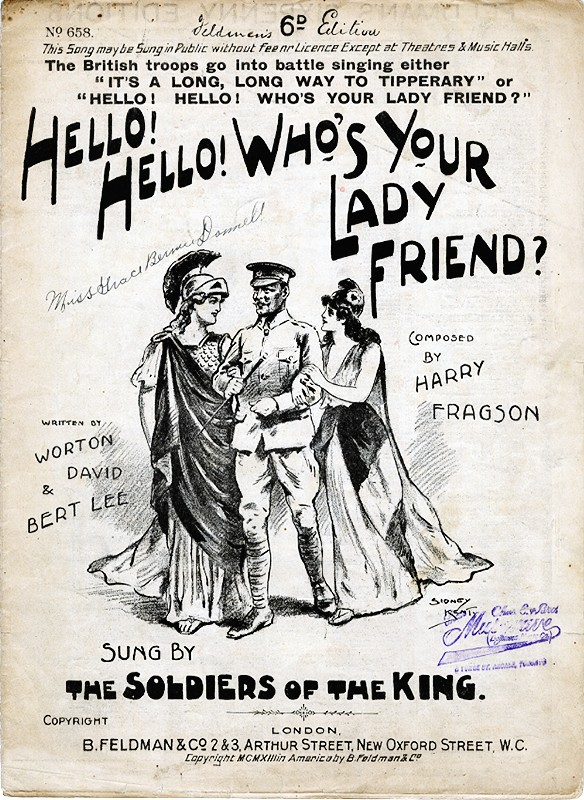

Song
- Published: 1913
- Genre: Music hall
- Composer(s): Harry Fragson
- Lyricist(s): Worton David, and Bert Lee

"Hello! Hello! Who's Your Lady Friend?"
"Hello! Hello! Who's Your Lady Friend?" sung by Stanley Kirkby in 1914

"Hello! Hello! Who's Your Lady Friend?" is an English music hall song from 1913, with music by Harry Fragson and words by Worton David and Bert Lee.

The song was recorded by Fragson in 1913, and by both Stanley Kirkby and Ted Yorke in the following year. It became a popular marching song among soldiers in the First World War. It was later performed and recorded by many other singers.
