= Mary Morton =

British sculptor (1880–1965)

- Born: 21 March 1879; Stroud, England
- Died: 15 June 1965 (aged 86); Sopworth House, 4 Rosecroft Avenue, Hampstead, London, England
- Education: Bristol School of Art; Royal College of Art
- Occupation: Sculptor
- Years active: 1907–1948

Mary Morton (21 March 1879 – 15 June 1965) was a British sculptor.

== Early life and education ==
Morton was born in Stroud, England on 21 March 1879. Her father was George Morton, a surgeon who was born around 1839 in the East Indies. She attended the Bristol School of Art before studying at the modelling school of the Royal College of Art between 1911 and 1913.

== Professional career ==
In 1913 Morton became a member of the Royal West of England Academy. In 1928 she became an Associate of the Royal British Society of Sculptors before becoming a Fellow there in 1948. Her work was part of the sculpture event in the art competition at the 1948 Summer Olympics. She also worked closely with the Associate of the Society of Women Artists and exhibited 105 works with there between 1913 and 1960.

Her sculpture of Charles Kennedy Scott is held by the Trinity Laban Conservatoire of Music and Dance and her woodcarving, Study of a Nude Girl beneath a Tree Carved with Foliage, is held by the Royal West of England Academy. During World War II she worked as an ARP warden at Princess Beatrice Hospital, Earl's Court, London.

== Death ==
Morton died on 15 June 1965 in Sopworth House, 4 Rosecroft Avenue, Hampstead, London. At the time of her death, her estate was worth £22,900.

== Exhibitions ==
- Aberdeen Artists Society, Exhibition of Works of Modern Artists, 1929 and 1931.
- Bristol Academy – 1907, 1913 and 1915.
- City of Manchester Art Gallery – 1927.
- Leeds City Art Gallery – 1910 and 1927.
- Royal Academy of Arts – 1909, 1912–1919, 1921–1922, 1927–1928, 1930–1935 and 1940–1941.
- Royal Glasgow Institute of the Fine Arts, exhibited 12 times between 1923 and 1940.
- Royal Scottish Academy – Exhibited two works in 1914, two works in 1927, one work in 1928, one work in 1929, one work in 1930, one work in 1932, one work in 1934, one work in 1935, one work in 1936, two works in 1937, one work in 1939, one work in 1940, one work in 1941, one work in 1942, one work in 1944, two works in 1946 and one work in 1948.
- Royal West of England Academy – 1916, 1918, 1919, 1920, 1921, 1922, 1923–1924, 1924, 1925–1926, 1926–1927, 1927–1928, 1928–1829 and 1929–1930.
