= Harry Fragson =

British music hall singer and comedian

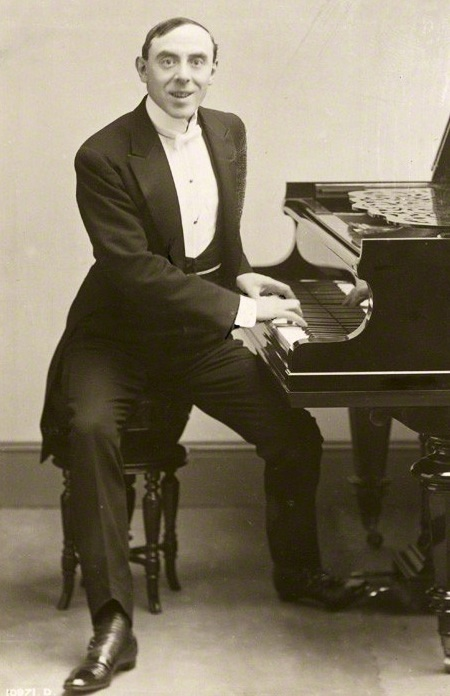
- Fragson in the 1900s
- Born: Léon Philippe Pot; 2 July 1869; London, England
- Died: 31 December 1913 (aged 44); Paris, France
- Cause of death: Shot by his father
- Occupations: Music hall singer, songwriter, comedian

Harry Fragson (2 July 1869 – 31 December 1913), born Léon Philippe Pot, was a British music hall singer, songwriter and comedian. Born in London of French parentage, he moved to Paris, where he developed an act imitating French music hall performers. The act was popular, and allowed him to introduce his own material. He returned to London in 1905, and became popular in pantomime. He is perhaps best known for his song "Hello, Hello, Who's Your Lady Friend?" which he recorded shortly before his death in 1913, when he was shot by his father in Paris.

== Biography ==
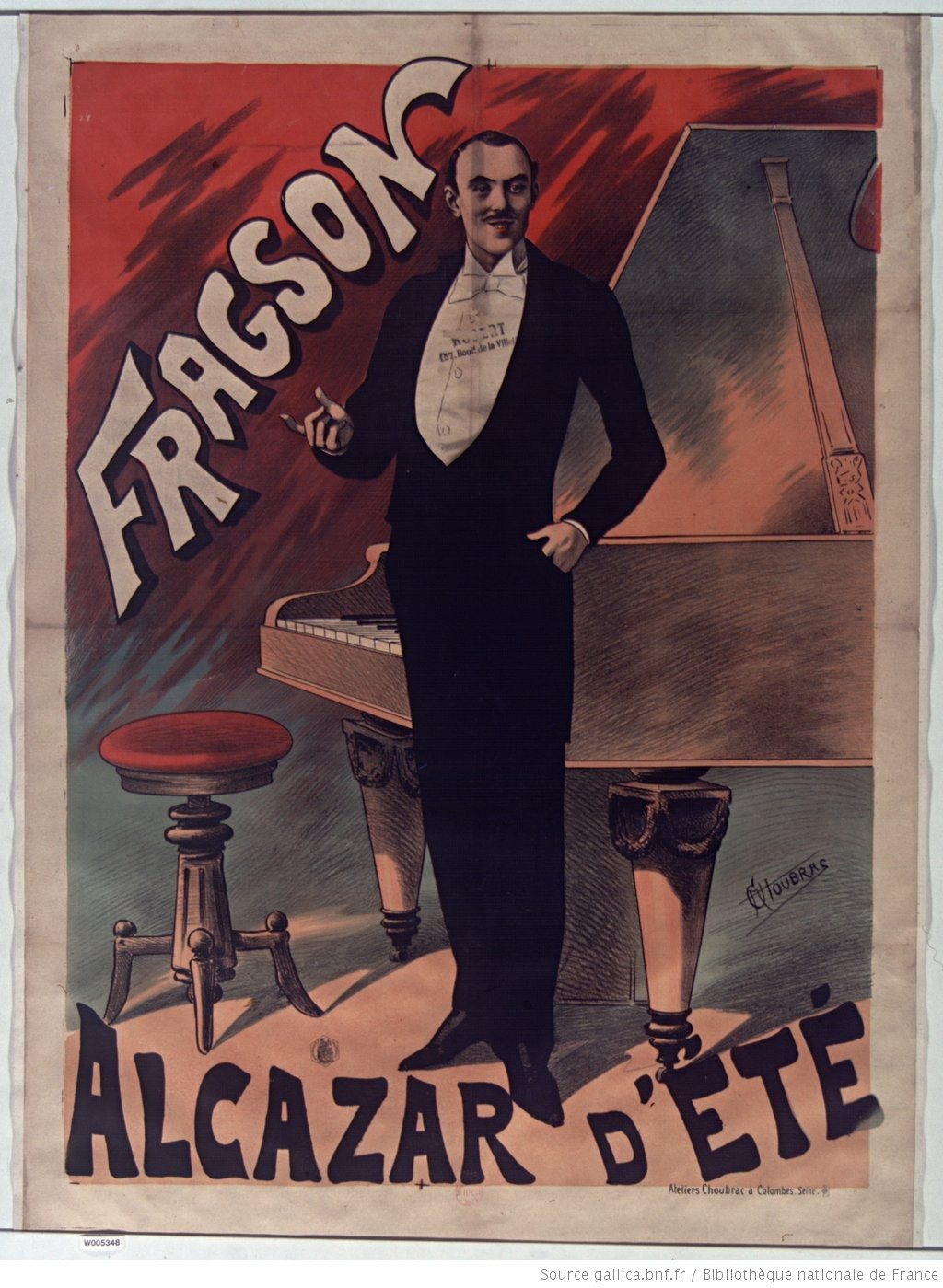
Fragson at the Alcazar d'Été, poster by Alfred Choubrac (1890).

Fragson was born Léon Philippe Pot at 4 Old Compton Street, Soho, London. He was the son of the hotelier Victor Pot and his wife Léontine Pot (née Winand). In 1871, the family moved to 42 Greek Street, Soho. He was educated for some time in Antwerp, and at the start of his career took the name "Frogson" (from the pejorative slur for a French person), before accepting advice to modify it to "Fragson", which he often used as a mononym.

His early career is obscure, though it is believed that he started singing in England around 1886 by performing as an amateur singer in provincial concerts. He came to Montmartre in Paris to make his debut around 1890. He perfected an impersonation of the singer Paulus and soon became a popular performer on the Parisian circuit. His success led him to drop the impersonations and perform his own songs, seated at the piano. The music hall historian Richard Anthony Baker described Fragson as "tall, with large expressive eyes, a drooping lower lip and long strands of hair that he plastered over his otherwise bald head".

In 1905, Arthur Collins, the manager of the Theatre Royal, Drury Lane, saw him at the Folies Bergère, and offered him a part as Dandigny in the pantomime Cinderella in London. Fragson wrote the song "Whispers of Love" for the show's star, May de Sousa, and by the end of the run Fragson was established as a star in London as well as in Paris. He continued to perform in both France and England, singing and recording in Paris in French with a slight English accent and in London in English with a slight French accent. In the early months of 1912, Fragson made the first of two appearances at the Kings Theatre in Scotland, having just been released from his engagement at the Alhambra theatre in Paris. He returned to make his final appearance on 15 October 1913, before going back to France.

As a songwriter, he often worked with lyricists Worton David and Bert Lee, writing the songs "Other Department, Please" (1910), "All the Girls Are Lovely by the Seaside" (1913), and his biggest success, "Hello, Hello, Who's Your Lady Friend?" (1913). In 1912, he acted in a short film, L'entente cordiale, made in Paris with Max Linder.

For a time he was married to the French revue performer Alice Delysia. On 31 December 1913, while living at 56 rue Lafayette in Paris, Fragson returned home to discover his mentally ill father Victor Pot was just about to commit suicide. An argument ensued as Pot suspected his son was having an affair with his mistress Paulette Franck. Pot then fatally shot his son. His father died six weeks later in an asylum.

More than 50,000 people followed Fragson's hearse to Saint Augustin church. Fragson is buried at Père Lachaise Cemetery in Paris.

== Legacy ==
Fragson was perhaps best known in France as a popular pre-World War I entertainer, and introduced hundreds of songs, including "Reviens", "Si tu veux...Marguerite", "À la Martinique", "La Baya", "Les Blondes", "Les Jaloux", "Amours fragiles" and "Les Amis de Monsieur". He had an Irving Berlin song, "A Girl In Havana", adapted to "Je connais une blonde" which was popular among World War I soldiers. Upon his death, Fragson left £80,000 in his will.
