= Jack Raymond =

British actor and director (1886–1953)

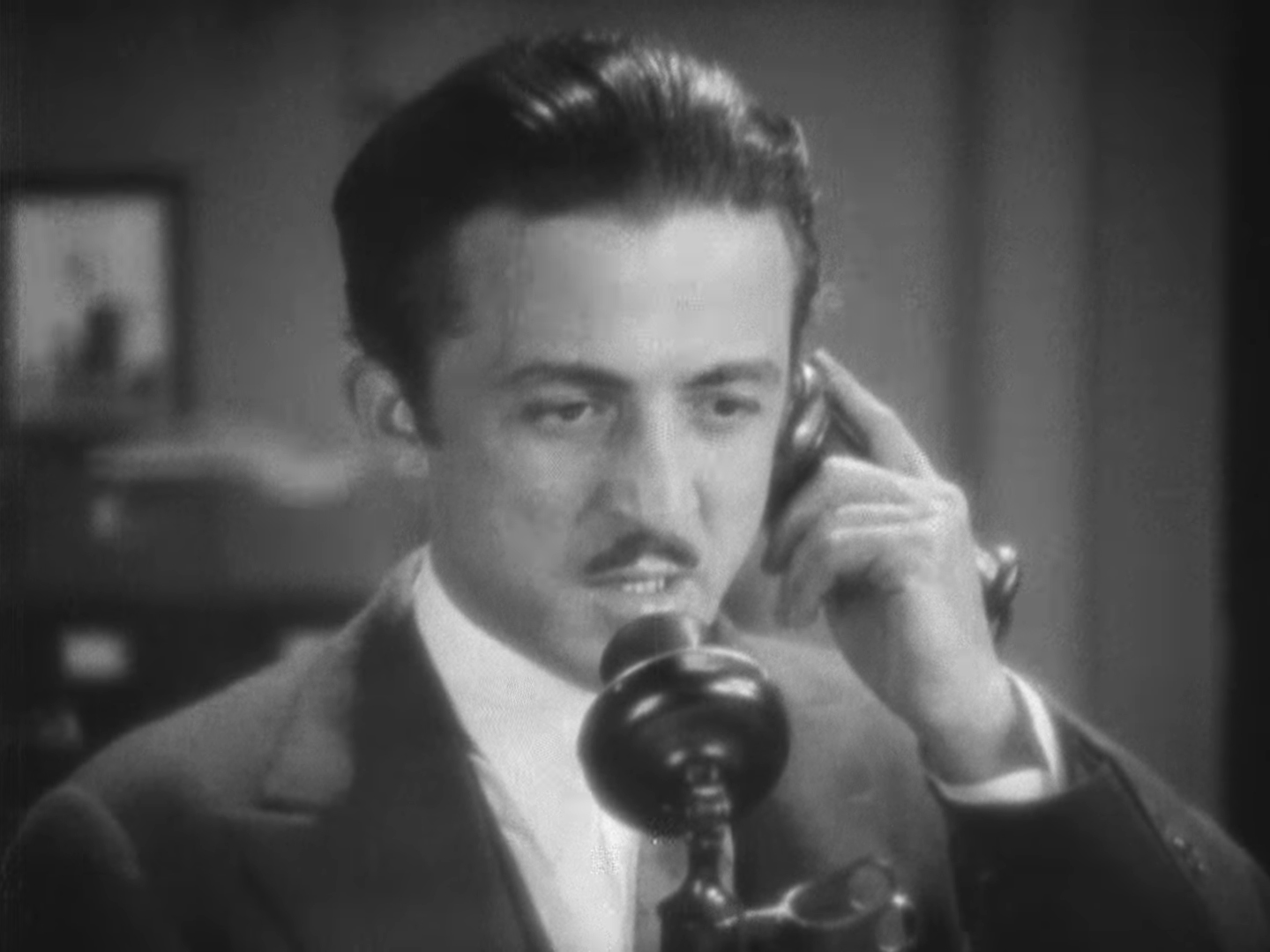
- Jack Raymond in The Last Command (1928)
- Born: 1886; Wimborne, Dorset, England
- Died: 20 March 1953 (aged 66–67); London, England
- Occupations: Actor; Film Director

Jack Raymond (1886–1953) was an English actor and film director. Born in Wimborne, Dorset in 1886, he began acting before the First World War in A Detective for a Day. In 1921, he directed his first film and gradually he wound down his acting to concentrate completely on directing - making more than forty films in total before his death in 1953.

He was associated with the Hepworth Studios of Walton on Thames, since his portrait appears on a studio publicity postcard when he was probably in his early twenties.

He had a major success in 1930 with The Great Game, one of the earliest films devoted to football and followed it up with Up for the Cup a year later. He remade Up for the Cup in 1950.

== Partial filmography ==
=== Director ===
- The Vicar of Wakefield (1913)
- Red, White and Blue Blood (1917)
- The English Rose (1920)
- The Flat (1921)
- A Woman Misunderstood (1921)
- Tilly of Bloomsbury (1921)
- The Curse of Westacott (1921)
- Second to None (1927)
- Lonesome (1928)
- Sally of the Scandals (1928)
- Three Weekends (1928)
- A Peep Behind the Scenes (1929)
- Splinters (1929)
- The Great Game (1930)
- Mischief (1931)
- Almost a Divorce (1931)
- Tilly of Bloomsbury (1931)
- Up for the Cup (1931)
- Life Goes On (1932)
- Say It with Music (1932)
- Up to the Neck (1933)
- It's a King (1933)
- Night of the Garter (1933)
- Girls, Please! (1934)
- Come Out of the Pantry (1935)
- Where's George? (1935)
- Streamline Express (1935)
- The Preview Murder Mystery (1936)
- Talk of the Devil (1936)
- When Knights Were Bold (1936)
- Chick (1936, producer)
- The Frog (1937)
- Blondes for Danger (1938)
- A Royal Divorce (1938)
- You Will Remember (1941)
- Up for the Cup (1950)
- Take Me to Paris (1951)
- Reluctant Heroes (1951)

=== Actor ===
- The Vicar of Wakefield (1913) - Moses Primrose
- The Lights of Home (1920) - Mark
- The English Rose (1920)
- His Other Wife (1921) - Dick Riviere
- The Dinkum Bloke (1923) - John Gilder
- Dope (1924)
- The Only Way (1925) - Jacques
- The Last Command (1928) - Assistant Director
- Up for the Cup (1931) - Railway clerk (final film role)
