= R. P. Weston =

English songwriter (1878–1936)

- Also known as: Robert P. Weston; Bob Weston
- Born: Robert Patrick Harris; 7 March 1878; Islington, London, England
- Died: 6 November 1936 (aged 58) London, England
- Genres: Music hall; comic songs; musical theatre; monologues; film songs
- Occupation: Songwriter
- Years active: c.1900–1936
- Formerly of: Conway and Weston

Robert Patrick Weston (né Harris; 7 March 1878 – 6 November 1936) was an English songwriter. He was responsible for many successful songs and comic monologues between the 1900s and 1930s, mostly written in collaboration with other writers, notably Fred J. Barnes and Bert Lee, and performed successfully by Harry Champion, Stanley Holloway, and Gracie Fields, among others.

== Biography ==
=== Early life and career ===
Robert Patrick Harris was born on 7 March 1878 in Kingsbury Road, Islington, close to Dalston Junction in London. His father ran a grocery shop and the family lived over it. Harris initially worked for an engineering company, from which he was dismissed for spending time writing verses on the back of scraps of emery paper. He married Maud Barker in 1900 and became a railway clerk, living in Hemmingford Road, Islington with his wife, but took up performing and songwriting. For his wife's health, they moved to Weston-super-Mare, where Harris joined a concert party, took the stage name Weston, and became half of a double act, Conway and Weston. He soon moved to Ramsgate, where he started writing songs, before returning to London.

He sold his first song, "Boys of the Chelsea School", to the publishing firm of Francis, Day and Hunter in 1902; it was popularised on stage by George Leyton. Weston continued to write songs himself, and in collaboration with other songwriters. Among the most successful and lasting songs from the early part of his career were "What a Mouth", sung by Harry Champion in 1906 and successfully revived in 1960 by Tommy Steele; and "I'm Henery the Eighth, I Am", written with Fred Murray in 1910 and also popularised and first recorded by Champion, which became a Billboard Hot 100 number 1 for Herman's Hermits in the U.S. in 1965.

=== Partnerships ===
Bob Weston had a successful songwriting partnership with Fred J. Barnes. They co-wrote "Little Willie's Woodbines" (1908); "I've Got Rings On My Fingers" (1909); "When Father Papered the Parlour" (1910, popularised by Billy Williams); and "Hush Here Comes the Dream Man", recorded in 1911 by Florrie Forde, parodied by First World War soldiers as "Hush Here Comes a Whizzbang", and sung in the Theatre Workshop production of Oh, What a Lovely War! in 1963. Weston also co-wrote "Sister Susie's Sewing Shirts for Soldiers", written with Herman Darewski in 1914, which was Al Jolson's first hit.

In 1915, music publisher David Day, of Francis, Day and Hunter, introduced him to Bert Lee, the collaborator with whom Weston had the most lasting relationship. They worked together over the next twenty years on some 3000 songs and monologues, 75 stage shows and musicals, and 17 films, as well as for pantomimes and radio shows. They immediately found success together with "Lloyd George's Beer Song" (1915), "Good-bye-ee!" (1917, made popular by Florrie Forde), and "Paddy McGinty's Goat", which later received a new lease of life as part of the repertoire of Irish entertainer Val Doonican, who recorded it in 1964. From the start, their collaborations were conducted in Weston's house in Twickenham. They kept office hours, met every day and aimed to write at least one song each day. Both wrote both words and music, but according to Lee: "Bob has the brains. I put the laughs in." As well as songs for revues, notably those produced by Lupino Lane, they wrote sketches for such stars as Fred Karno, Robb Wilton and Wee Georgie Wood.

=== Theatre ===
In the 1920s, Weston and Lee wrote for many theatre productions, and adapted many American productions for the British stage. In 1926, they started working with theatre producers Jack Waller and Joe Tunbridge, and wrote several musical comedies together, many featuring the comedian Bobby Howes. They wrote the monologue "My Word, You Do Look Queer", first recorded by Ernest Hastings in 1922 and later popularised by Stanley Holloway.

Weston and Lee wrote sketches for the Crazy Gang, and several of Stanley Holloway's monologues in the 1930s. Together with Weston's son Harris Weston (born Robert Edgar Harris, 1901–1978), they wrote Holloway's 1934 monologue "With Her Head Tucked Underneath Her Arm", about the ghost of Anne Boleyn haunting the Tower of London, seeking revenge on Henry VIII for having her beheaded. Father and son also collaborated on Gracie Fields' 1933 song "Heaven Will Protect an Honest Girl", and on "Harmonica Dan" in 1936.

Weston was also a talented amateur artist, whose paintings reflect his London background and include a watercolour of Houndsditch Market painted in 1916.

He died from a brain tumour in London in 1936, aged 58.

== Legacy and influence ==
After Weston's death, his house was occupied by his two daughters who lived there into old age, with Weston and Lee's papers sitting untouched and unlooked-at. Their present whereabouts are mostly unknown though several items have appeared on eBay, including Weston and Lee's three-volume workbook, containing manuscript versions of many, if not all, their songs, which it is now known is in the hands of a collector of music hall memorabilia. In 1985, the entertainer Roy Hudd created a stage show based on the songs of Weston and Lee, Just a Verse and a Chorus, performed by Hudd and Billy Dainty, and wrote about them in a now defunct periodical, Theatrephile. Hudd also adapted the stage show into a series of shows for BBC Radio 2. A programme exploring the lives and work of Weston and Lee was broadcast on BBC Radio 4 on 16 June 2009, presented by Children's Laureate Michael Rosen.

== Selected filmography ==
- Up for the Cup (1931)
- Splinters in the Navy (1931)
- No Lady (1931)
- The Mayor's Nest (1932)
- Trouble (1933)
- Up for the Derby (1933)
- It's a King (1933)
- This Is the Life (1933)
- It's a Cop (1934)
- Girls, Please! (1934)
- Squibs (1935)
- Where's George? (1935)
- Fame (1936)
- Splinters in the Air (1937)
- O-Kay for Sound (1937)

== Selected stage works ==
- He Wanted Adventure (1933)
- These Foolish Things (1938)

== Songs ==
- 1914 "Sister Susie's Sewing Shirts for Soldiers" (m: Herman E. Darewski)
- 1915 '"Cassidy – Private Micheal Cassidy" with Jack Norworth
- 1915 "Lloyd George's Beer Song" with Bert Lee
- 1916 "Blighty, the Soldier's Home Sweet Home" with Bert Lee
- 1917 "Good-bye-ee!", with Bert Lee
- 1919 "It's Hard to Settle Down to Civilian Life Once More" (m: Bert Lee)
