= British and Dominions Imperial Studios =

Former film studios in Elstree, England

Imperial Studios
- Interactive map of the Imperial Studios area
- Alternative names: British and Dominions Imperial Studios

General information
- Type: Film studios
- Location: Imperial Place, Elstree Way, Borehamwood, Hertfordshire, United Kingdom
- Coordinates: 51.6583°N 0.2677°W
- Construction started: 1929
- Destroyed: 9 February 1936
- Owner: British and Dominions Film Corporation

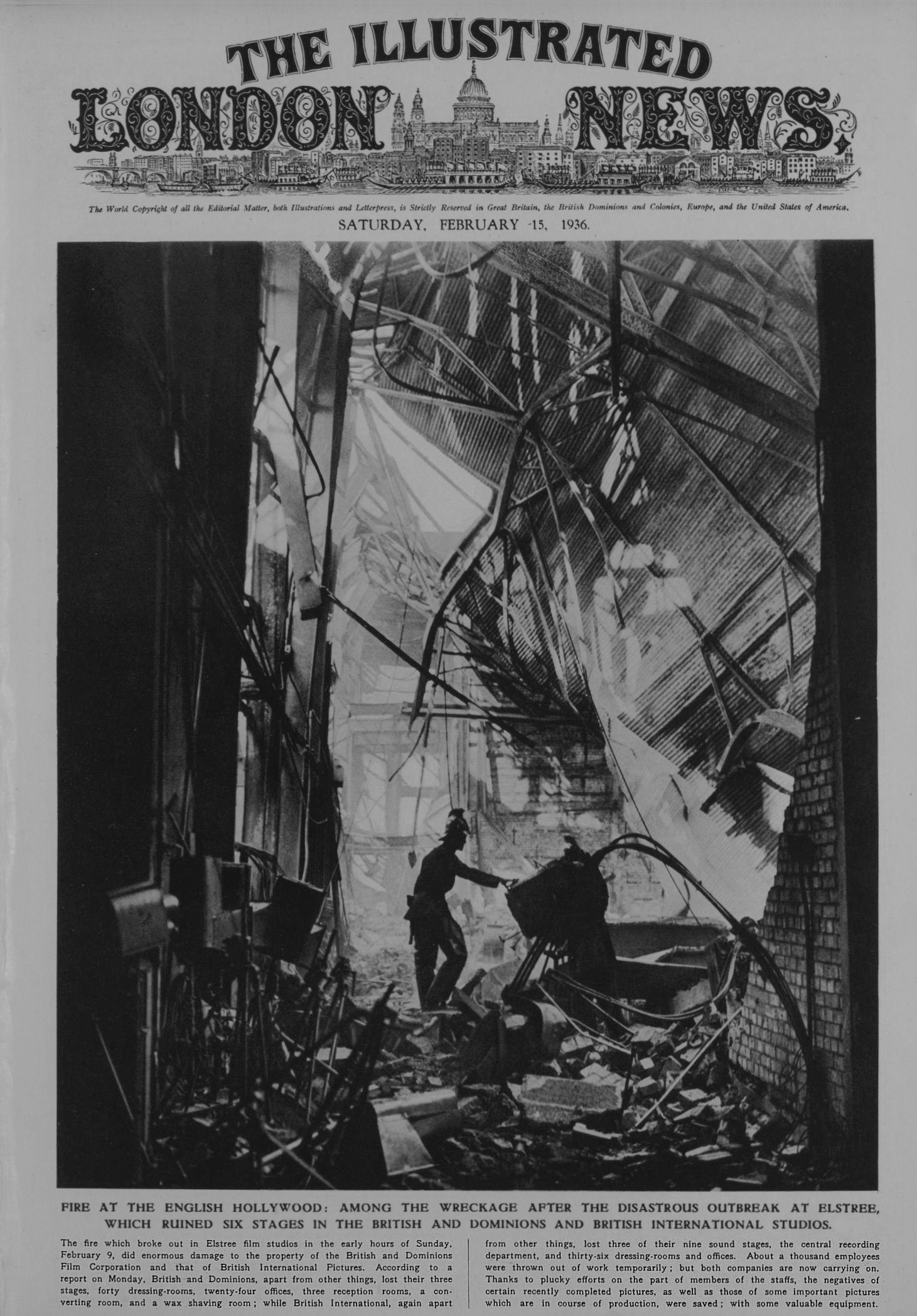
1936. Fire destroys three stages of British and Dominions Studios. From the Illustrated London News 15 February 1936

Imperial Studios were the studios of the British and Dominions Film Corporation, a short-lived British film production company located at Imperial Place, Elstree Way, Borehamwood, Hertfordshire. The studios (one of several facilities historically referred to as Elstree Studios) were active from 1929 to 1936, when they were destroyed by fire.

The company relocated to Pinewood Studios but ceased production in 1938.

== History ==
British and Dominions was one of the successors to British National Pictures, which began operations in 1925 and was taken over by British International Pictures in 1927. The British and Dominions Film Corporation was formed in June 1927 by Herbert Wilcox and was registered as a public company on 13 February 1928. As it had no studios of its own, its first films, which were silent, were made at Cricklewood Studios. In 1930, the company, which had been incorporated for the purpose of physically producing sound films, bought three new sound stages from British International at Borehamwood before their construction was completed. The new Imperial Studio was the first purpose-built sound studio in Europe. Blackmail (1929), directed by Alfred Hitchcock and the first British talkie, had been made at the facility before British and Dominions took it over.

Filmmakers who worked for British and Dominions included producer Anthony Havelock-Allan, who made Lancashire Luck (1937) there. Alexander Korda's London Films produced The Private Life of Henry VIII, which featured an Oscar-winning performance by Charles Laughton, at Imperial Studios. The film's success in the United States and elsewhere persuaded United Artists and The Prudential to invest in Korda's proposed Denham Film Studios.

The studio was destroyed by a fire on 9 February 1936, which also destroyed three of the nine stages at the adjacent British International Studios. British and Dominions made a substantial investment in Pinewood Studios, Iver Heath, Buckinghamshire, and moved production there, including the Herbert Wilcox production London Melody (1937) which was in production at the time of the fire. The company's last film was released in January 1938.

The support buildings at Borehamwood that remained after the fire were sold off to various companies including Frank Landsdown Ltd, which opened a film vault service. The Rank Organisation bought the music stage for the production of documentary films. It later became the headquarters of the film and sound-effect library, Cinesound Effects Library Ltd.

In 1944, D & P Holdings, a subsidiary of General Cinema Finance Corporation, acquired British and Dominions Film Corporation.

In 1996, a plaque was placed at the location of the former studio.

== Films shot at Imperial Studios ==
=== Produced by other companies ===
Other companies used British and Dominions' studios to shoot the following films.

- French Leave (D&H Productions; 1930)
- The Nipper (Betty Balfour Pictures; 1930)
- A Warm Corner (Gainsborough Pictures; 1930)
- Contraband Love (British Screenplays; 1931)
- The Sport of Kings (Gainsborough; 1931)
- The Written Law (Reginald Fogwell; 1931)
- Tilly of Bloomsbury (Sterling; 1931)
- Baroud (Rex Ingram; 1932)
- Ebb Tide (Paramount; 1932)
- A Man of Mayfair (Paramount; 1932)
- Service for Ladies (Paramount; 1932)
- These Charming People (Paramount; 1932)
- Women Who Play (Paramount; 1932)
- Diamond Cut Diamond (Cinema House; 1932)
- Down Our Street (Paramount; 1932)
- Lily Christine (Paramount; 1932)
- Men of Tomorrow (London; 1932)
- Money Means Nothing (Paramount; 1932)
- That Night in London (London; 1932)
- Counsel's Opinion (London; 1933)
- Strange Evidence (London; 1933)
- Cash (London Films; 1933)
- For Love of You (Windsor; 1933)
- Going Gay (Windsor Films; 1933)
- No Funny Business (John Stafford; 1933)
- The Private Life of Henry VIII (London; 1933)
- The Rise of Catherine the Great (London; 1934)
- The Lady is Willing (Columbia; 1934)
- The Private Life of Don Juan (London; 1934)
- The Scarlet Pimpernel (London; 1934)
- Sanders of the River (London; 1935)
- Flame in the Heather (Crusade; 1935)
- No Monkey Business (Radius; 1935)
- Turn of the Tide (British National; 1935)
- Debt of Honour (British National; 1936)
- Fame (Herbert Wilcox; 1936)
- Limelight (Herbert Wllcox; 1936)
- The Prisoner of Corbal (Capitol; 1936)
- When Knights Were Bold (Capitol; 1936)
- A Woman Alone (Garrett-Klement Pictures; 1936)
- The Three Maxims (Wilcox-Cie Pathe Consortium; 1936)

== See also ==
- Associated British Picture Corporation
- List of British and Dominions films
- Category:Films shot at Imperial Studios, Elstree
- Category:British and Dominions Studios films
- Lists of productions shot at the other Elstree studios:
  - List of films and television shows shot at Elstree Studios
  - List of films and television shows shot at Clarendon Road Studios
  - Gate Studios § Films shot at the studios
  - List of films shot at MGM-British Studios, Elstree
  - New Elstree Studios § List of films shot at New Elstree Studios
