= Johnnie Schofield =

British actor (1889–1955)

- Publicity still, The Mystery of the Mary Celeste (1935)
- Born: John William Schofield; 10 March 1889; Islington, Middlesex, England
- Died: 9 September 1955 (aged 66); Marylebone, London, England
- Occupation: Actor

Johnnie William Schofield (10 March 1889 – 9 September 1955) was a British actor, known for The Middle Watch (1948), Tawny Pipit (1944) and Melody of My Heart (1936).

== Early life ==
Johnnie William Schofield was born on 10 March 1889 in Islington, Middlesex, as John William Schofield. He was the eldest son of music hall vocalist Johnnie Schofield (1858–1921) and Laura Purvis (1867–1955).

== Death ==
He died on 9 September 1955 in Marylebone, London.

== Selected filmography ==
- The Pride of the Force (1933, uncredited)
- Hawleys of High Street (1933, uncredited)
- The Outcast (1934, uncredited)
- Keep It Quiet (1934) – George (uncredited)
- The Great Defender (1934) – Power station worker
- Josser on the Farm (1934, uncredited)
- A Real Bloke (1935, uncredited)
- Royal Cavalcade (1935) – Drinker (uncredited)
- Cock o' the North (1935) – Bert Harris
- Jimmy Boy (1935)
- The Mystery of the Mary Celeste (1935) – Peter Tooley
- Father O'Flynn (1935) – Cassidy
- Variety (1935, uncredited)
- Sexton Blake and the Bearded Doctor (1935, uncredited)
- Living Dangerously (1936) – Prisoner
- Melody of My Heart (1936)
- Love in Exile (1936) – Laundry Man (uncredited)
- The Amazing Quest of Ernest Bliss (1936) – Lift Operator (uncredited)
- Song of Freedom (1936)
- The End of the Road (1936) – Jock
- The Song of the Road (1937, uncredited)
- Make-Up (1937) – Publicity Man
- Talking Feet (1937) – Stage Door Keeper (uncredited)
- The Last Adventurers (1937) – Stalk
- Rhythm Racketeer (1937) – Spike
- Sam Small Leaves Town (1937) – Sam Small
- Incident in Shanghai (1938) – Ted Higgins
- I See Ice (1938) – Man In Club Showing George Tricks (uncredited)
- Special Edition (1938) – Horatio Adams
- Lassie from Lancashire (1938) – Cyril
- Night Journey (1938, uncredited)
- Mountains O'Mourne (1938, uncredited)
- Down Our Alley (1939) – Waiter
- The Spy in Black (1939) – Armed Guard of POWs on Ferry (uncredited)
- The Arsenal Stadium Mystery (1939) – Arsenal Doctor
- Contraband (1940) – Waiter at the Cab Drivers' Shelter (uncredited)
- Gaslight (1940) – John (uncredited)
- Let George Do It! (1940) – Solicitous Steward
- Spare a Copper (1940) – Policeman (uncredited)
- Sailors Three (1940) – Officer Reading Heliograph Message (uncredited)
- You Will Remember (1941) – Sheet Music Seller (uncredited)
- Sheepdog of the Hills (1941) – Tom Abbott
- Gert and Daisy's Weekend (1942) – Policeman at Town Hall (uncredited)
- Bob’s Your Uncle (1942) – Stationmaster
- The Next of Kin (1942) – Lance-Corporal
- The Day Will Dawn (1942) – Soldier in Fleet Street Pub with Harry (uncredited)
- Uncensored (1942, uncredited)
- The Goose Steps Out (1942) – 1st Observer (uncredited)
- Gert and Daisy Clean Up (1942) – Policeman on Night Duty (uncredited)
- In Which We Serve (1942) – Coxswain
- The Young Mr. Pitt (1942) – Minor Role (uncredited)
- Went the Day Well? (1942) – Joe Garbett
- The Gentle Sex (1943) – Sgt. in Dance Cafe (uncredited)
- We Dive at Dawn (1943) – Policeman in Chip Shop (uncredited)
- The Bells Go Down (1943) – Milkman
- Old Mother Riley Detective (1943) – P.C. Jimmy Green
- Theatre Royal (1943) – Fred (uncredited)
- I'll Walk Beside You (1943) – Porter
- The Flemish Farm (1943) – Road Gang Worker (Who Passes Message) (uncredited)
- Millions Like Us (1943) – George, The Crowsons' Next-Door Neighbour (uncredited)
- The Demi-Paradise (1943) – Ernie
- Up with the Lark (1943) – Mr. Tanner
- The New Lot (1943) – Homeguard Sgt. (uncredited)
- Down Melody Lane (1943) – Sam Mitchell
- Tawny Pipit (1944) – Sergeant Dawkins
- Fanny by Gaslight (1944) – Joe (uncredited)
- Welcome, Mr. Washington (1944) – Butcher (uncredited)
- The Way Ahead (1944) – Lewis Gun Instructor (uncredited)
- English Without Tears (1944) – Police Sergeant
- They Came to a City (1944) – Bert the barman (uncredited)
- Love Story (1944) – Bus Passenger (uncredited)
- Waterloo Road (1945) – George, Pub Landlord (uncredited)
- Blithe Spirit (1945) – R.A.C. Man Directing Traffic (uncredited)
- Give Me the Stars (1945) – Ted James
- The Way to the Stars (1945) – Jones
- Perfect Strangers (1945) – Seaman Issuing Messdeck Rations (uncredited)
- The Rake's Progress (1945) – Hotel Bellboy (uncredited)
- The Echo Murders (1945) – Purvis
- The Voice Within (1946) – Lorry Driver
- Night Boat to Dublin (1946) – Factory Watchman (uncredited)
- Wanted for Murder (1946) – Chip Shop Owner (uncredited)
- I See a Dark Stranger (1946) – Villager (uncredited)
- This Man Is Mine (1946, uncredited)
- Code of Scotland Yard (1947) – Inspector Robson
- Dancing with Crime (1947) – Fred (uncredited)
- So Well Remembered (1947) – 1st Publican (uncredited)
- Captain Boycott (1947) – British Soldier in Bar (uncredited)
- While I Live (1947) – Alfie
- The Mark of Cain (1947) – Chemist (uncredited)
- So Evil My Love (1948) – Railway Porter (uncredited)
- My Brother Jonathan (1948) – Trade Union Man
- Mr. Perrin and Mr. Traill (1948) – Barman
- Love in Waiting (1948) – Inspector Bates
- A Piece of Cake (1948) – Window Cleaner
- For Them That Trespass (1949) – Warder In Condemned Cell (uncredited)
- The Perfect Woman (1949) – Ticket Collector
- Train of Events (1949) – First Aid Man at Crash Site (uncredited)
- Dark Secret (1949) – Motor Coachman (uncredited)
- The Rocking Horse Winner (1949) – 1st Chauffeur (uncredited)
- The 20 Questions Murder Mystery (1950)
- The Reluctant Widow (1950)
- Night and the City (1950) – Cashier (uncredited)
- Trio (1950) – Minor Role (uncredited)
- The Second Mate (1950, uncredited)
- Blackmailed (1951) – Maurice's Taxi Driver
- A Tale of Five Cities (1951) – Commissionaire (uncredited)
- The Browning Version (1951) – Taxi Driver (uncredited)
- White Corridors (1951) – Night Porter
- Lady Godiva Rides Again (1951) – Shooting Stall Keeper at British Festival (uncredited)
- I Believe in You (1952) – Jim, Lorry Driver (uncredited)
- Home at Seven (1952) – Joe Dobson, Landlord of the Feathers (uncredited)
- Something Money Can't Buy (1952) – Irish Policeman (uncredited)
- The Gentle Gunman (1952) – ARP Warden at Tube Station (uncredited)
- The Voice of Merrill (1952) – Night Porter
- Three Steps to the Gallows (1953) – Charley
- The Net (1953) – Jim Barnes (uncredited)
- The Fake (1953) – Tate Gallery Attendant (uncredited)
- The Square Ring (1953) – Seating Attendant (uncredited)
- Wheel of Fate (1953) – Len Bright
- The Final Test (1953) – Railway Porter (uncredited)
- Meet Mr. Lucifer (1953) – Trap Door Stage Hand (uncredited)
- Small Town Story (1953, uncredited)
- Solution by Phone (1954, uncredited)
- The Scarlet Web (1954, uncredited)
- The Belles of St. Trinian's (1954) – Spider (uncredited)
- Aunt Clara (1954) - Barman (uncredited)
- Carrington V.C. (1954) – Hallam (uncredited)
- See How They Run (1955, uncredited; final film role)
- Goldilocks and the Three Bears, and

As Humpty Dumpty, at Prince's Theatre, Bristol, 1924/'25

1927/'28,

- As Phil Emerald: 'Zero Hour'

2 May 1944, Duke of York's Theatre, London.

14 – 19 June 1944, Lyric Theatre (Hammersmith) (Shaftesbury Ave), London.

- As Corporal Cramp: 'Love Goes To Press'

22 July – 24 August 1946, Duchess Theatre, London.
