= Judgment Deferred =

1952 British film by John Baxter

- Australian daybill poster
- Directed by: John Baxter
- Screenplay by: Barbara K. Emary; Walter Meade; Geoffrey Orme
- Produced by: John Baxter; Barbara K. Emary
- Starring: Joan Collins; Hugh Sinclair; Helen Shingler; Abraham Sofaer
- Cinematography: Arthur Grant
- Edited by: Vi Burdon
- Music by: Kennedy Russell
- Production company: Group 3
- Distributed by: Associated British Film Distributors (UK)
- Release date: February 1952
- Running time: 88 minutes
- Country: United Kingdom
- Language: English
- Budget: £50,000

Judgment Deferred is a 1952 British second feature drama film directed by John Baxter and starring Joan Collins, Hugh Sinclair, Helen Shingler and Abraham Sofaer. It was written by Barbara K. Emary, Walter Meade and Geoffrey Orme. The film is a remake of the director's earlier film, Doss House (1933).

== Plot ==
With the assistance of a journalist a group of refugees and down and outs try and unmask the criminal who has framed one of their number as a drug dealer.

== Cast ==
- Hugh Sinclair as David Kennedy
- Helen Shingler as Kay Kennedy
- Abraham Sofaer as Chancellor
- Leslie Dwyer as Flowers
- Joan Collins as Lil Carter
- Harry Locke as Bert
- Elwyn Brook-Jones as Coxon
- Marcel Poncin as Stranger
- Martin Benson as Pierre Desportes
- Bud Flannagan as himself
- Bransby Williams as dad
- Michael Martin Harvey as Martin
- Harry Welchman as Doc
- Wilfred Walter as Judge
- Maire O'Neill as Mrs. O'Halloran
- Mary Merrall as Lady Musterby
- Edgar Driver as Blackie
- Billy Russell as Ginger
- Sam Kydd as ambulance driver

== Production ==
The film was shot at Southall Studios with sets designed by the art director Don Russell. It was the first production from Group 3 Films, a company formed to encourage new young British film-makers (which later produced The Brave Don't Cry, Conflict of Wings, The Angel Who Pawned Her Harp and several other low-budget features).

== Critical reception ==
The Monthly Film Bulletin wrote: "Judgment Deferred revives many elements of an earlier John Baxter film, The Common Touch; as a piece of story-telling it is confused and unexciting, frequently sidetracked into episodes of naive sentimentality and crude comedy. The script, in fact, is a concoction of contrived melodrama and irrelevant detail, and the characterisation is lifeless. All this, combined with the artificial sets and lighting, reminds one of the lower grade British picture of the 30's; the increased smoothness is hardly a satisfactory disguise."

The Radio Times described the film as "a muddled, maudlin melodrama that feels like substandard Frank Capra done by amateur theatricals."

TV Guide found the film "captivating mainly because of the novelty of the story and the many strange characters that are introduced."

Sky Movies wrote "this one occasionally creaks under the strain of its longish running time but offers some striking tableaux, especially within the weird 'court' held by a crowd of criminals, eccentrics and jobless that in some ways recalls the 'jury' that proved the nemesis of Peter Lorre in Fritz Lang's classic thriller 'M'."
