= The Grand Escapade =

1946 film directed by John Baxter

- Directed by: John Baxter
- Written by: Geoffrey Orme; Barbara K. Emary
- Story by: Geoffrey Orme
- Produced by: John Baxter
- Starring: The Artemus Boys; James Harcourt; Patrick Curwen; Peter Bull
- Cinematography: Jo Jago
- Edited by: Vi Burdon
- Music by: Kennedy Russell
- Production company: Viking Film Studios
- Release date: 6 January 1947
- Running time: 71 minutes
- Country: United Kingdom
- Language: English

The Grand Escapade is a 1946 British family adventure film directed by John Baxter and starring the Artemus Boys, James Harcourt, Patric Curwen and Peter Bull. It was written by Geoffrey Orme and Barbara K. Emary.

== Plot ==
Three boys join an old traveller on his journey through Southern England, eventually helping to expose and capture some smugglers.

== Cast ==
- The Artemus Boys as themselves
- James Harcourt as old traveller
- Patric Curwen as author
- Peter Bull as Jennings
- Edgar Driver as night watchman
- Ernest Sefton as Simon Archer
- Ben Williams as Jack Barrow
- Howard Douglas as Mark Han
- Ivor Barnard as fisherman
- Charles Rolfe as first farmhand
- Arthur Denton as second farmhand

== Production ==
According to the British Film Institute: "In the press kit the Artemus Boys are identified as Tom played by Peter from Newcastle, Dick played by Philip from Hull and Harry played by Jackie from Bradford."

== Reception ==
The Monthly Film Bulletin wrote: "Here is the simplest of boys' stories, and Baxter's main idea seems to be to show some of London's famous landmarks and peaceful scenes of rural England. His method is not always successful, for his absorption in pictorial beauty of coast or forest often distracts from his actors or his actors are annoying intrusions on the interest of the scenery. A very modest film but human and sincere."
