= Barbara K. Emary =

British screenwriter and film producer (1908–1995)

- Born: 1 August 1908; Wimbledon, United Kingdom
- Died: October 1995 (aged 87); Uckfield, East Sussex, United Kingdom
- Occupations: Writer, producer
- Years active: 1938–1959 (film)

Barbara K. Emary (1908–1995) was a British screenwriter and film producer. She worked frequently with the director John Baxter.

== Selected filmography ==
=== Producer ===
- Fortune Lane (1947)
- Nothing Venture (1948)
- The Second Mate (1950)
- Judgment Deferred (1952)
- You're Only Young Twice (1952)
- Ramsbottom Rides Again (1956)
- Make Mine a Million (1959)

=== Screenwriter ===
- Stepping Toes (1938)
- Old Mother Riley in Society (1940)
- Love on the Dole (1941)
- Old Mother Riley in Business (1941)
- Crook's Tour (1941)
- Old Mother Riley's Circus (1941)
- The Common Touch (1941)
- Let the People Sing (1942)
- We'll Smile Again (1942)
- When We Are Married (1943)
- Old Mother Riley Detective (1943)
- The Grand Escapade (1947)

=== Production manager ===
- The Shipbuilders (1943)
- Candles at Nine (1944)
- Laxdale Hall (1953)

== Bibliography ==
- Brian McFarlane. Lance Comfort. Manchester University Press, 1999.
