= The Common Touch =

1941 British film by John Baxter

- Original British trade ad
- Directed by: John Baxter
- Written by: Barbara K. Emary; Geoffrey Orme
- Based on: a story by Herbert Ayres (as C.G.H. Ayres)
- Produced by: John Baxter
- Starring: Geoffrey Hibbert; Harry Welchman; Greta Gynt; Joyce Howard
- Cinematography: James Wilson
- Edited by: Jack Harris
- Music by: Kennedy Russell
- Production company: British National Films
- Distributed by: Anglo-American Film Corporation (UK)
- Release date: 15 December 1941 (UK)
- Running time: 104 minutes
- Country: United Kingdom
- Language: English

The Common Touch is a 1941 British drama film directed by John Baxter and starring Geoffrey Hibbert, Harry Welchman, Greta Gynt, and Joyce Howard. It was written by Barbara K. Emary and Geoffrey Orme based on story by Herbert Ayres (as C.G.H. Ayres). The film is a remake by Baxter of his 1933 film Doss House.

Pianist Mark Hambourg appears in a small role.

== Plot ==
At the age of 18 Peter Henderson is orphaned and has to leave school in the middle of the term (after winning a cricket match) to take over the father's firm, "Henderson's", one of the most important in the City of London. The directors are shocked by his youth. Cartwright, one of the company directors, tries to retain control of the decision-making, but Peter follows his father's explicit instructions to learn about the business.

One day, Peter asks an employee about what occupies a certain city block his firm wants to demolish. (Cartwright and his cronies are secretly trying to enrich themselves.) The man tells him about Charlie's, a dosshouse. Peter and a former schoolmate disguise themselves as down-and-outs to look the place over. While they are there, Charlie notifies everyone that the establishment will be closing soon, as it and the neighbouring tenements will be demolished by the firm which owns the block.

Inky, one of the residents, consults lawyer "Lincoln's Inn". He has kept away from his beautiful daughter, cabaret performer Sylvia Meadows, because of his forgery and blackmailing past. He thinks he is the reason Sylvia has not married noted cricketer Stuart Gordon; Lincoln agrees to see what he can do. Peter eavesdrops when Charlie consults with Lincoln, and learns that Cartwright is involved in the eviction and is coming to Charlie's tomorrow.

Inky sends a letter to his daughter via Peter, which he delivers at a cricket match, but she does not believe her father can keep his word, as he has been previously unable to do so. When Inky is told, that she remains scared that any husband will discover Inky's criminal past, he commits suicide. He leaves behind a letter for Lincoln's Inn which reveals that he forged the signature of John Henderson on a document on behalf of Cartwright, which he believes has something to do with the closing of Charlie's. However, Lincoln states they need to get their hands on some of Cartwright's papers as corroboration.

Peter takes Tich, a former safe-breaker, to Cartwright's apartment and break into his safe while Mary keeps him occupied with flattery. With the relevant document obtained, Peter informs Charlie's residents that his company will rebuild a new and better Charlie's.

== Cast ==
- Geoffrey Hibbert as Peter Henderson
- Harry Welchman as "Lincoln's Inn"
- Greta Gynt as Sylvia Meadows
- Joyce Howard as Mary
- Edward Rigby as "Tich", the manager of the dosshouse
- Bransby Williams as Ben
- George Carney as Charlie, who runs the dosshouse
- Eliot Makeham as "Inky"
- Mark Hambourg as "Chopin"
- Paul Martin as Chris
- Raymond Lovell as Cartwright
- John Longden as Stuart Gordon
- Wally Patch as "Nobby"
- Edgar Driver as "Oily"
- Bernard Miles as Cricket Steward
- Scott Sanders as Pat
- Ian Maclaren as harmonica player (as Sydney Shaw)
- Jerry Verno as office messengerSandy Macpherson as himself.
- Iris Vandeleur as Alice

Listed in opening, but not closing credits:

- Charles Carson as Haywood [Henderson's butler]
- Ben Williams as workman watching cricket match
- John Slater as Joe
- Bill Fraser as Harris
- John Turnbull as father at cricket match
- Marian Spencer as mother at cricket match
- Grant Tyler as son at cricket match
- Dennis Wyndham as commissionaire
- Hector Abbas as foreigner

There is also an appearance by Carroll Gibbons the bandleader.

== Production ==
Filming started 21 May 1941. It was the first production from British National after a six week break.

== Reception ==
The Monthly Film Bulletin wrote: "As in Love on the Dole, John Baxter has touched upon the deeper things in the lives of ordinary people. His direction is admirable, the sound-recording and photography first-class. ... The acting is of the highest order. Geoffrey Hibbert more than fulfils the promise he showed in Love on the Dole. Here is star material which must not be spoiled. Edward Rigby as 'Tich' is superb, and Harry Welchman, known so well for his musical comedy successes, is admirable as 'Lincoln's Inn'. Bransby Williams, too, as Old Ben, proves once again that he is a character par excellence."

Kine Weekly wrote: "Director John Baxter has nothing to learn when it comes to down-to-earth comedy and drama. Neither has he as a talent scout. Geoffrey Tiibbert, the screen's latest juvenile lead, exceeds all expectations as the ex-schoolboy hero. Moreover, the co-stars, supporting players, and galaxy of stage, cabaret, music-hall, radio and concert platform talent respond equally well. The complete show is brilliantly balanced light entertainment. Excellent British picture."

Picturegoer wrote: "This is a picture of queer contrasts, it has some excellent sequences and some extremely artificial interludes. Sometimes John Baxter shows directorial genius and at others becomes completely commonplace, The opening which presents a cricket match and provides the clue to the theme is very good indeed but when we come to the doss house sequences, an air of unreality seems to creep in."

Picture Show wrote: "The acting is splendid all round, in addition to the great performance of Geoffrey Hibbert. ... A very fine film which will appeal to all audiences."
