= Mark Daly (actor) =

British actor (1887–1957)

- Born: 23 August 1887; Edinburgh, Midlothian, Scotland
- Died: 27 September 1957 (aged 70); London, England
- Other name: Thomas Mark Daly
- Occupation: Actor
- Years active: 1931–1957 (film)

Mark Daly (23 August 1887 – 27 September 1957) was a British film actor.

Daly was born in Edinburgh, Scotland, on 23 August 1887, making his first stage appearance in Swansea, Wales, in 1906. Six years later, in 1912, he made his first London stage appearance at the Shaftesbury Theatre. For three years, he was the principal comedian at The Fred Karno Company, a collection of comedians who worked in both British variety and American vaudeville. Other "Karno Comedians" included Charlie Chaplin and Billie Ritchie. During his time as an actor, Daly took part in excess of 25 motion pictures before his death on 27 September 1957 in England.

== Filmography ==
- East Lynne on the Western Front (1931) – Maurice / Levison
- The Beggar Student (1931) – Sergeant
- The Third String (1932) – Pete Russett
- Doss House (1933) – Shoeblack
- The Private Life of Henry VIII (1933) – Bit Part (uncredited)
- A Cuckoo in the Nest (1933) – Pinhorn
- Up for the Derby (1933) – Jerry Higgs
- Say It with Flowers (1934) – Scotty MacDonald
- The River Wolves (1934) – Jock Brodie
- Music Hall (1934) – Scotty
- Bypass to Happiness (1934) – Wallop
- There Goes Susie (1934) – Sunshine
- Flood Tide (1934) – Scotty
- Open All Night (1934)
- A Real Bloke (1935) – Scotty
- That's My Uncle (1935) – Walter Frisbee
- Jubilee Window (1935) – Dave
- The Ghost Goes West (1935) – Murdoch's Groom
- Music Hath Charms (1935) – Ship's Captain (uncredited)
- The Small Man (1936) – Scotty
- The Man Who Could Work Miracles (1936) – Toddy Beamish
- Southern Roses (1936) – MacDougal (uncredited)
- Hearts of Humanity (1936) – Carbolic
- The Captain's Table (1936) – Saunders
- Shipmates o' Mine (1936) – Andrew McFee
- Murder at the Cabaret (1936) – (uncredited)
- Good Morning, Boys (1937) – Arty Jones
- Wings of the Morning (1937) – James Patrick Aloysius 'Jimmy' Brannigan
- Wanted! (1937) – Mr. Smithers
- The Lilac Domino (1937) – (uncredited)
- Knight Without Armour (1937) – Hospital Orderly (uncredited)
- Command Performance (1937) – Joe
- Captain's Orders (1937) – Scotty
- Follow Your Star (1938) – The Property Man
- Lassie from Lancashire (1938) – Dad
- Break the News (1938) – Shorty
- Q Planes (1939) – John – Factory Watchman (uncredited)
- Contraband (1940) – Taxi Driver (uncredited)
- Hoots Mon! (1940) – Campbell
- Ten Days in Paris (1940) – (uncredited)
- The Girl in the News (1940) – Taxi Driver (uncredited)
- The Farmer's Wife (1941) – P. C. Chave
- The Big Blockade (1942) – Driver (uncredited)
- The Next of Kin (1942) – Corporal on Train (uncredited)
- The Voyage of Peter Joe (1946) – Nobby
- Bonnie Prince Charlie (1948) – Ian MacQueen (uncredited)
- The Romantic Age (1949) – Withers
- Three Bags Full (1949) – Nobby
- The Card (1952) – Mayor (uncredited)
- Alf's Baby (1953) – Will Donkin
- Don't Blame the Stork (1954) – Michael O'Connor
- Lease of Life (1954) – Spooner
- Delavine Affair (1955) – Mr. Bissett
- Footsteps in the Fog (1955)
- The Feminine Touch (1956) – Gardener (uncredited)
- The Gelignite Gang (1956) – Carter, 1ST Watchman
- Keep It Clean (1956) – Stage Door Keeper
- You Pay Your Money (1957) – Goodwin
- The Tommy Steele Story (1957) – Junkshop Man (uncredited)
- The Shiralee (1957) – Sam
- The Story of Esther Costello (1957) – Billy (uncredited)
- Soapbox Derby (1958) – Grandpa (final film role)
