= When We Are Married (film) =

- Directed by: Lance Comfort
- Written by: J. B. Priestley; Barbara K. Emary
- Produced by: John Baxter
- Starring: Sydney Howard; Raymond Huntley; Olga Lindo
- Cinematography: James Wilson
- Music by: Kennedy Russell
- Production company: British National Films
- Release date: 12 July 1943
- Running time: 98 minutes
- Country: United Kingdom
- Language: English

When We Are Married is a 1943 British comedy-drama film directed by Lance Comfort and starring Sydney Howard, Raymond Huntley and Olga Lindo.

== Plot ==
The film is a screen version of the 1938 stage play by J. B. Priestley, in which three Edwardian era Yorkshire couples, who were all married on the same day 25 years earlier, gather to celebrate their joint silver wedding anniversary, only to be told that due to a legal technicality, their marriages were not valid and that for the past quarter-century they have all effectively been living in sin. Some react with horror at potential scandal, while others glimpse the possibility of freedom from a deadbeat spouse, or regret potential loves that got away after they were "married". Much drama ensues as the couples each re-evaluate their respective marriages, but after grievances have been aired and new understandings forged, all ends happily. The Monthly Film Bulletin, known for its exacting standards, complimented the film as "an exceedingly amusing, if somewhat unkind, picture of a Yorkshire chapel-going fraternity...under the skilful direction of Lance Comfort all the cast bring the characters to life".

== Cast ==
- Sydney Howard as Henry Ormondroyd
- Raymond Huntley as Albert Parker
- Olga Lindo as Maria Helliwell
- Marian Spencer as Annie Parker
- Ethel Coleridge as Clara Soppitt
- Lloyd Pearson as Joe Helliwell
- Ernest Butcher as Herbert Soppitt
- Barry Morse as Gerald Forbes
- Lesley Brook as Nancy Holmes
- Marjorie Rhodes as Mrs. Northup
- Charles Victor as Mr. Northup
- Cyril Smith as Fred Dyson
- George Carney as Landlord
- Lydia Sherwood as Lottie Grady
- Patricia Hayes as Ruby Birtle
