= Old Mother Riley Detective =

- Original trade poster
- Directed by: Lance Comfort
- Written by: Barbara K. Emary; Arthur Lucan; Austin Melford; Geoffrey Orme
- Produced by: John Baxter
- Starring: Arthur Lucan; Kitty McShane; Hal Gordon
- Cinematography: James Wilson
- Edited by: E.W. White
- Music by: Kennedy Russell
- Production company: British National Films
- Distributed by: Anglo-American Film Corporation
- Release date: 31 May 1943 (UK)
- Running time: 80 minutes
- Country: United Kingdom
- Language: English

Old Mother Riley Detective is a 1943 British comedy film directed by Lance Comfort and starring Arthur Lucan, Kitty McShane and Hal Gordon. It was part of the long running Old Mother Riley series, and was written by Barbara K. Emary, Lucan, Austin Melford and Geoffrey Orme. Old Mother Riley investigates the disappearance of food during the war, a serious crime because of rationing.

== Plot ==
The film opens with a night watchman being bludgeoned, as a safe is cracked open in the offices of the District Food Controller. A list of wartime foods to be rationed is stolen, and the police fear gangsters are planning to sell the foods on the black market. As the office charwoman, Old Mother Riley's fingerprints are all over the safe, and she becomes the police's number one suspect. To prove her innocence, Mother Riley turns detective, adopting various methods and disguises to track down the villains.

== Cast ==
- Arthur Lucan as Mrs. Riley
- Kitty McShane as Kitty Riley
- Ivan Brandt as Inspector Victor Cole
- Owen Reynolds as Kenworthy
- George Street as Inspector Moresby
- Johnnie Schofield as P.C. Jimmy Green
- Hal Gordon as Bill
- Valentine Dunn as Elsie
- H. F. Maltby as H. G. Popplethwaite
- Peggy Cummins as Lily
- Alfredo Campoli as solo violinist

== Critical reception ==
Kine Weekly wrote: "After over a year's absence, Lucan and McShane return to the screen in a new British National subject ... Claimed to be the most uproarious of the Rileys, it is also from a technical point of view, the most polished of the series. What matters most to exhibitors, however, is that another Riley has been completed for the Riley series, which without exception have proved the most surefire box-office of any pictures yet made."

The Monthly Film Bulletin wrote: "The slight and typical Old Mother Riley story has obviously been written to give scope to Arthur Lucan. Kitty McShane sings pleasantly but, like the rest of the cast, has little to do but to lend a helping hand now and then as the story unfolds."

TV Guide wrote of the film, "a lifeless effort...The gangster premise is merely an excuse for Lucan to try out some humorous bits (in drag, of course), but the picture is too padded to hold much interest."
