= Geoffrey Orme =

British screenwriter (1904–1978)

- Born: Geoffrey Percival Orme; 10 June 1904; Ilford, Essex, England
- Died: 21 January 1978 (aged 73); East Sussex, England
- Occupation: Screenwriter

Geoffrey Percival Orme (10 June 1904 – 21 January 1978) was a British screenwriter for television and film.

== Career ==
Orme's prolific film work extended from the 1930s to the 1960s and included a number of the popular Old Mother Riley films starring Arthur Lucan.

His script for the BBC television series Doctor Who, The Underwater Menace, was commissioned by producer Innes Lloyd and recorded with Patrick Troughton in 1967. It featured the notion of Atlantis being buried under the sea and controlled by the insane Professor Zaroff.

== Writing credits ==
Production	Notes	Broadcaster
Sunshine Ahead	Feature film (1936)	N/A
Hearts of Humanity	Feature film (co-written with Herbert Ayres, Gerald Elliott and Jack Francis, 1936)	N/A
Talking Feet	Feature film (1937)	N/A
What Would You Do, Chums?	Feature film (co-written with David Evans and Con West, 1939)	N/A
Old Mother Riley in Business	Feature film (1941)	N/A
Old Mother Riley's Ghosts	Feature film (1941)	N/A
Old Mother Riley's Circus	Feature film (1941)	N/A
The Common Touch	Feature film (1941)	N/A
Let the People Sing	Feature film (1942)	N/A
Old Mother Riley Detective	Feature film (1943)	N/A
Theatre Royal	Feature film (1943)	N/A
Here Comes the Sun	Feature film (1946)	N/A
The Grand Escapade	Feature film (1946)	N/A
Fortune Lane	Feature film (1947)	N/A
Nothing Venture	Feature film (1948)	N/A
When You Come Home	Feature film (1948)	N/A
The Last Load	Feature film (1948)	N/A
Three Bags Full	Feature film (1949)	N/A
The Second Mate	Feature film (co-written with Anson Dyer, Barbara K. Emary and Jack Francis, 1950)	N/A
Judgment Deferred	Feature film (1952)	N/A
Miss Robin Hood	Feature film (co-written with Patrick Campbell, Reed De Rouen and Val Valentine, 1952)	N/A
Devil on Horseback	Feature film (1954)	N/A
Delayed Action	Feature film (1954)	N/A
Orders Are Orders	Feature film (1954)	N/A
The Love Match	Feature film (1955)	N/A
Ramsbottom Rides Again	Feature film (co-written with Arthur Askey, John Baxter, Glenn Melvyn and Basil Thomas, 1956)	N/A
The End of the Road	Feature film (1957)	N/A
The Heart Within	Feature film (1957)	N/A
Ivanhoe	"The Witness" (1958); "Lyman the Pieman" (1958); "The Ransom" (1958); "The Weavers" (1958); "The Masked Bandits" (1958); "Arms and the Women" (1958)	ITV
The Boy and the Bridge	Feature film (1959)	N/A
Interpol Calling	"Slave Ship" (1959)	ITV
The Avengers	"Man in the Mirror" (1963)	ITV
No Hiding Place	"Music for Murder" (1965)	ITV
Doctor Who	"The Underwater Menace" (1967)	BBC One
The Long Duel	Feature film (co-written with Ernest Bornemann, Ranveer Singh and Peter Yeldham, 1967)	N/A
