= Old Mother Riley in Business =

- Trade ad poster
- Directed by: John Baxter
- Written by: Geoffrey Orme; Con West
- Story by: Roger Clegg; Barbara K. Emary
- Produced by: John Baxter
- Starring: Arthur Lucan; Kitty McShane; Charles Victor; Cyril Chamberlain
- Cinematography: James Wilson
- Edited by: Michael C. Chorlton
- Music by: Kennedy Russell
- Production company: British National Films
- Distributed by: Butcher's Film Service
- Release date: November 1940
- Country: United Kingdom
- Language: English

Old Mother Riley in Business is a 1940 British comedy film directed by John Baxter and starring Arthur Lucan, Kitty McShane and Cyril Chamberlain. It was written by Geoffrey Orme and Con West, and was the sixth in the long-running Old Mother Riley series of films. Old Mother Riley's pub faces competition from a large chain store nearby, causing her to declare war on it.

== Plot summary ==
Old Mother Riley comes to the rescue of local shopkeepers after a ruthless chain, "Golden Stores" makes its aggressive presence felt. The boisterous Irish washerwoman gives the chain stores boss a push into the river and soon finds herself a wanted woman, donning a nurse's outfit to escape from the hospital in which she is hiding.

== Cast ==
- Arthur Lucan as Mrs Riley
- Kitty McShane as Kitty Riley
- Cyril Chamberlain as John Halliwell
- Ernest Butcher
- O. B. Clarence
- Edgar Driver
- Morris Harvey
- Roddy Hughes
- Ruth Maitland
- Edie Martin
- Wally Patch
- Ernest Sefton
- Charles Victor

== Reception ==
=== Box office ===
According to Kinematograph Weekly the film's box office performance in the north east of England improved after German bombing destroyed a stage show of Arthur Lucan; this caused cancellation of several of Lucan's stage shows but also led to increased bookings for Old Mother Riley in Business.

=== Critical ===
The Monthly Film Bulletin wrote: "As in the previous adventures, Arthur Lucan dominates the screen as Old Mother Riley and leaves the rest of the cast little to do. There is the usual mixture of wit, pure music-hall buffoonery and a modicum of pathos which will delight most English audiences."

Kinematograph Weekly wrote: "Arthur Lucan is in capital form as Old Mother Riley; he not only runs the familiar comedy gamut, but introduces a number of new gags. He is a tower of strength to the entertainment. Kitty McShane is less effective as Kitty, somehow she appears screen conscious, but Cyril Chamberlain and Eddie Martin are sound in direct support."
