= Sunshine Ahead =

- Jack Payne and his band in the film
- Directed by: Wallace Orton
- Written by: Geoffrey Orme; Con West
- Produced by: John Barter; John Baxter
- Starring: Eddie Pola; Betty Astell; Leslie Perrins
- Cinematography: Jack Parker; Desmond Dickinson
- Edited by: Vi Burdon
- Music by: Kennedy Russell
- Production companies: Baxter and Barter Productions
- Distributed by: Universal Pictures
- Release date: 6 July 1936
- Running time: 64 minutes
- Country: United Kingdom
- Language: English

Sunshine Ahead is a 1936 British musical comedy film directed by Wallace Orton and starring Eddie Pola, Betty Astell and Leslie Perrins. It was written by Geoffrey Orme and Con West and made at Cricklewood Studios as a quota quickie for release by Universal Pictures.

== Plot ==
Radio variety programme producer Eddie Pola's career and love life are threatened by a jealous press critic who sabotages his variety show with a bad review. Pola is given one more chance by his boss to produce a winning show. When the headline acts fail to show up due to their letters of confirmation not arriving, thanks to sabotage by the critic, Pola's engineers manage to broadcast the performers from their remote locations. Eddie delivers a successful program, outsmarting his rival and winning back his leading lady.

== Cast ==
- Eddie Pola as The Producer
- Betty Astell as The Girl
- Leslie Perrins as The Critic
- Eve Lister as The Secretary
- Doris Arnold as herself
- George Baker as himself
- Webster Booth as himself
- Dan Carlos as himself
- Leonard Henry as himself
- Leslie Holmes as himself
- Ruth Naylor as herself
- Jack Payne as himself
- Harry S. Pepper as himself
- Harold Ramsay as himself
- Rios and Santos as themselves
- Leslie Sarony as himself
- Pasqual Troise as himself
- The Sherman Fisher Girls as dancers

== Reception ==
The Monthly Film Bulletin wrote: The performances are quite up to the standard expected for this type of film, and those who appreciate these artistes when they broadcast, will enjoy seeing them on the screen."

Kine Weekly wrote: "Scrappy radio variety entertainment in which very ordinary turns, other than that represented by the featured act, are threaded together by an old-fashioned and incredibly naïve story. Production work is slipshod, and lacks showmanship, and the photography and recording leave much to be desired. The film has, in fact, no other booking angle than the value of Jack Payne's name on the bill. ... There may be sunshine ahead, but this amateurish conception of a jolly radio programme never catches up with it."

The Daily Film Renter wrote: "Selection of turns by well-known broadcast and variety stars, with Jack Payne and Band topping the bill. ... Best numbers are supplied by Payne, excerpt from "Faust," Two Leslies, and six piano jazz interlude. Reliable entertainment for the masses, with stellar names as obvious drawing card."

Picturegoer wrote: " The main attraction of this variety entertainment, which is entirely negligible in story value, is Jack Payne and his band, who put over a couple of excellent numbers with all their accustomed verve and enthusiasm. The turns generally are good, Doris Arnold putting over an exceedingly sound piano number. The excerpt from Faust is well done, too, and there is an informality about the whole show which makes it quite attractive of its. The general production, however, lacks polish, and the development is not as ingenious as it might have been."

Picture Show wrote: "There is practically no story in this film, which merely exploits the popularity of the many well-known wireless entertainers who make up the cast, These, headed by Jack Payne and his Band, who are at their best, make the film worth seeing."
