= Song of the Road =

Song of the Road may refer to:

- The Song of the Road, a 1937 British film directed by John Baxter
- Pather Panchali, a 1955 Indian film directed by Satyajit Ray often known by this title in English
