= Let the People Sing (film) =

- Original British lobby card
- Directed by: John Baxter
- Written by: John Baxter; Barbara K. Emary; Geoffrey Orme; J.B. Priestley (novel)
- Produced by: John Baxter; Wallace Orton
- Starring: Alastair Sim; Fred Emney; Edward Rigby
- Cinematography: James Wilson
- Edited by: Jack Harris
- Music by: Kennedy Russell
- Production company: British National Films
- Distributed by: Anglo-American Film Corporation
- Release date: 10 August 1942
- Running time: 105 minutes
- Country: United Kingdom
- Language: English

Let the People Sing is a 1942 British comedy film directed by John Baxter and starring Alastair Sim, Fred Emney and Edward Rigby. It was written by Baxter, based on the 1939 novel Let the People Sing by J. B. Priestley.

The screenplay concerns the people of a small town who band together to try to save their music hall from closure.

== Cast ==
- Alastair Sim as Professor Ernst Kronak
- Fred Emney as Sir George Denberry-Baxter
- Edward Rigby as Timmy Tiverton
- Oliver Wakefield as Sir Reginald Foxfield
- Patricia Roc as Hope Ollerton
- Annie Esmond as Lady Foxfield
- Marian Spencer as Lady Shepshod
- Olive Sloane as Daisy Barley
- Maire O'Neill as Mrs Mitterley
- Gus McNaughton as Ketley
- Charles Hawtrey as young Orton
- Peter Gawthorne as Major Shiptonthorpe
- Aubrey Mallalieu as Commander Spofforth
- G. H. Mulcaster as Inspector
- Wally Patch as Sam
- Horace Kenney as Walter Shepton
- Morris Harvey as Jim Flagg
- Ida Barr as Katie
- Spencer Trevor as Colonel Hazelhead
- Robert Atkins as Hassock
- Diana Beaumont as secretary
- Syd Crossley as Uncle Alfred
- A. Bromley Davenport as agent
- Charles Doe as mayor
- Alexander Field as Packles junior
- Ian Fleming as United Plastics barrister
- Richard George as Tom Largs
- Leopold Glasspoole as Pelham
- Michael Martin Harvey as Handover
- David Keir as Mr. Finningley
- Henry B. Longhurst
- Eliot Makeham as town clerk
- George Merritt as Police Sergeant
- Mignon O'Doherty as Dr Buckley
- Stan Paskin as attendant
- Peter Ustinov as Dr Bentika

== Production ==
The film's sets were designed by R. Holmes Paul. It was made at Elstree Studios.

== Reception ==
The Monthly Film Bulletin wrote: "This story has been designed to present a moral concerning the virtues of democracy, and the importance of public alertness: the example shown is local, but opportunity is not lost te suggest the national implications. This theme, many sentiments voiced by the characters, and especially by the professor who is the author's mouthpiece, are admirable. Unfortunately, however, the attempt to express them in terms of the film medium is somewhat inadequate. The whole thing is conceived in terms of theatre, and when a point is to be particularly emphasised, it is done by a long speech shot in close up. The story suffers too, as a film, from looseness of construction and disturbing longeurs. Its one outstanding feature is a fine performance by Fred Emney, who gives his part conviction and is extremely funny. It is, on the whole, a film which will probably be popular with British audiences who are prepared not to be overcritical of its shortcomings."

Time Out wrote that "John Baxter was the British director probably least patronizing and most sympathetic to the working classes and their culture during the '30s and '40s, and even if his films now often seem naïve and simplistic, it's good at least to see an honest and humorous attempt to deal with life outside Mayfair. Less scathing than Love on the Dole (his best known film), this adaptation of a J.B. Priestley novel is a spritely, vaguely Capra-esque comedy... Fred Emney steals the show as a government arbitrator susceptible to the charms of alcohol."
