= Geoffrey Hibbert =

English actor (1922–1969)

- Born: 2 June 1922; Hull, East Riding of Yorkshire, England
- Died: 3 February 1969 (aged 46); Epsom, Surrey, England
- Occupation: Actor
- Years active: 1941-1969 (TV & film)
- Spouse: Elinor Dunkley (m. 1945) Prudence Rennick (m. 1953)
- Children: 2, including Edward Hibbert

Geoffrey Hibbert (2 June 1922 – 3 February 1969) was an English stage, film and television actor.

== Biography ==
He made his screen debut with the lead role in John Baxter's The Common Touch (1941) and appeared in two other Baxter films, Love on the Dole and The Shipbuilders. After the war he appeared in supporting roles in films as well as many television performances.

He was also active at the Players' Theatre in the 1950s and 60s, acting in, among other things, the musical revue "Child's Play" with all words by Sean Rafferty. He was also in the original Broadway production of Sandy Wilson's The Boyfriend, starring Julie Andrews, which ran for over a year at the Royale Theatre, in 1954–1955.

He was the father of the actor Edward Hibbert.

== Filmography ==
=== Film ===
Year	Title	Role	Notes
1941	Love on the Dole	Harry Hardcastle	
1941	The Common Touch	Peter Henderson	
1942	The Next of Kin	Pvt. John	
1942	In Which We Serve	Joey Mackeridge	
1943	The Shipbuilders	Peter Shields	
1952	Secret People	Steenie	
1952	Emergency Call	Jackson	
1953	Albert R.N.	Cutter	
1954	For Better, for Worse	Butcher's Assistant	
1954	Thought to Kill		
1957	The End of the Line	Max Perrin	
1958	Orders to Kill	RAF Sergeant	Uncredited
1958	I Was Monty's Double	Cpl. Cooper	Uncredited
1958	Links of Justice	Edward Manning	
1959	The Great Van Robbery	Venner	
1959	Crash Drive	Henry	
1962	Gaolbreak	Dr. Cambus	
1962	Live Now – Pay Later	Price	
1963	Heavens Above!	Council Official	

=== Television ===
Year	Title	Role	Notes
1958	The Diary of Samuel Pepys	Thomas Turner	Episode: #3
1961	Jango	Brooks	Episode: "Great Day for Jango"

== Bibliography ==
- Anthony Aldgate & Jeffrey Richards. Britain Can Take It: The British Cinema in the Second World War. I.B.Tauris, 2007.
