= Song of the Plough =

1933 film directed by John Baxter

- Directed by: John Baxter
- Written by: Reginald Pound
- Produced by: Ivar Campbell
- Starring: Stewart Rome; Rosalinde Fuller; Allan Jeayes; Hay Petrie
- Cinematography: George Stretton
- Edited by: David Lean
- Music by: Colin Wark
- Production company: Sound City
- Distributed by: Metro-Goldwyn-Mayer
- Release date: December 1933
- Running time: 68 minutes
- Country: United Kingdom
- Language: English

Song of the Plough, later re-released with the alternative title Country Fair, is a 1933 British drama film directed by John Baxter and starring Stewart Rome, Rosalinde Fuller and Allan Jeayes. The screenplay concerns an English farmer who is saved from financial ruin when his dog wins at a sheepdog trials.

== Cast ==
- Stewart Rome as Farmer Freeland
- Rosalinde Fuller as Miss Freeland
- Allan Jeayes as Joe Saxby
- Hay Petrie as farmhand
- Kenneth Kove as Archie
- Jack Livesey as squire's son
- Edgar Driver as barber
- James Harcourt as doctor
- Freddie Watts as bandsman
- Albert Richardson as singer

== Production ==
The film was a quota quickie made for distribution by the American company MGM. It was filmed at Shepperton Studios with location shooting on a farm in Sussex.

== Reception ==
The Daily Film Renter wrote: "Narrative is slender and so contrived as to stress unjustness of tithe system and potentialities of the land in national prosperity. Rather overlong tap-room vocalism holds up plot, but is productive of amusing moments."

Picture Show wrote: "The superb pastoral beauty of England is shown with such artistry in this film, that it is a pity the story is so weak, for it merely shows us a farmer saved from ruin by winning the local sheepdog trials. Delightful glimpses of village life and characters. It is worth seeing for its beauty alone."

The film received a poor review from The Observer critic C. A. Lejeune, but she was forced to withdraw this following numerous letters in support of the film. The film proved unexpectedly popular when it was released.
