= Say It with Flowers (1934 film) =

1934 British musical film

- Opening titles
- Directed by: John Baxter
- Written by: H. Fowler Mear; Wallace Orton
- Produced by: Julius Hagen
- Starring: Mary Clare; Ben Field; George Carney
- Cinematography: Sydney Blythe
- Edited by: Michael C. Chorlton
- Music by: Colin Wark
- Production company: Twickenham Studios
- Distributed by: Radio Pictures
- Release date: 1934
- Running time: 71 min
- Country: United Kingdom
- Language: English

Say It with Flowers (also known as Say It with Flowers (A Human Story)) is a 1934 British musical film directed by John Baxter and starring Mary Clare, Ben Field and George Carney. It was written by H. Fowler Mear and Wallace Orton. The screenplay concerns a group of London shopkeepers who hold a benefit concert in a local pub to raise money for a woman to visit the seaside for her health. The film is notable for the performances of several music hall stars Florrie Forde, Charles Coborn and Marie Kendall.

== Synopsis ==
The film is set in a street market in the Old Kent Road. One of the stallholders, Kate, is a flower seller who many of the leading music hall stars buy their flowers from. When Kate falls ill and visits the Doctor she is prescribed a stay at the seaside to restore her health. However, she is too ill to work to pay for her visit. Her fellow stallholders rally round, and secretly organise a concert at a nearby pub to help raise the money. They approach all the great musical hall performers (many from the golden era of musical hall) who have used her stall over the years. The concert is successfully staged and Kate is able to head to the seaside.

== Cast ==
- Mary Clare as Kate Bishop
- Ben Field as Joe Bishop
- George Carney as Bill Woods
- Mark Daly as Scotty MacDonald
- Edgar Driver as Titch
- Freddie Watts as Steve
- Edwin Ellis as Ted
- Wilson Coleman as doctor
- Roddy Hughes as Sam, the newspaper seller
- Florrie Forde as herself
- Charles Coborn as himself
- Marie Kendall as herself

== Reception ==
Kine Weekly wrote: "Mary Clare and Ben Field are delightful as the old cockney couple, and succeed in winning a measure of sympathy. George Carney is excellent as Bill and Florrie Ford, Marie Kendal, and Charles Coburn revive tender memories with their old songs. The early scenes, devoted to establishing atmosphere and character are slightly protracted, but once the story takes tangible shape, it carries real heart interest."

The Daily Film Renter wrote: "Early footage devoted to 'atmospheric' cameos of street market life, which, although on naive side, are always amusing. Highlights are erstwhile music-hall stars, while settings and direction are good. Should evoke a ready response from popular patrons, with old-timers as top billing."

Picturegoer wrote: "Here is an excellent British comedy which succeeds in bringing a part of London's life and people to the screen. There is an appealing Darby and Joan theme and a simple human story, while there is much entertainment in its amusing sketches of cockney character. Indeed, one's enjoyment depends less on the actual story than on these characterisations. ... John Baxter's direction is efficient, but uninspired, and the early development is rather too leisurely."

In his book The Age of the Dream Palace Jeffrey Richards highlighted the film's genuine sympathy with the lives of the ordinary people it is portraying.
