= Stanley Pavey =

British cinematographer (1913–1984)

Stanley Pavey (1913–1984) was a British cinematographer.

== Selected filmography ==
- Dreaming (1944)
- They Came to a City (1944)
- Pink String and Sealing Wax (1945)
- Here Comes the Sun (1946)
- Daughter of Darkness (1948)
- The Happiest Days of Your Life (1950)
- The Galloping Major (1951)
- Mother Riley Meets the Vampire (1952)
- The Happiness of Three Women (1954)
- The Belles of St. Trinian's (1954)
- The Man in the Road (1956)
- Hour of Decision (1957)
- Too Many Crooks (1959)
- Mrs. Gibbons' Boys (1962)
- Mystery Submarine (1963)
- Girl in the Headlines (1963)
