= Nothing Venture =

- Directed by: John Baxter
- Written by: Geoffrey Orme
- Produced by: John Baxter; Barbara K. Emary
- Starring: The Artemus Boys; Terry Randall; Patric Curwen; Michael Aldridge
- Cinematography: Jo Jago
- Edited by: Vi Burdon
- Music by: Kennedy Russell
- Production company: John Baxter Productions
- Distributed by: British Lion
- Release date: 29 January 1948
- Running time: 73 minutes
- Country: United Kingdom
- Language: English

Nothing Venture is a 1948 British comedy family film directed by John Baxter and starring The Artemus Boys, Terry Randall, Patric Curwen and Michael Aldridge. It was written by Geoffrey Orme.

== Plot ==
When rescuing horserider Diana Chaice, whose horse was startled by a gunshot, the Artemus Boys stumble on a plot to steal the plans for a secret ray invented by her father.

== Cast ==
- The Artemus Boys as themselves
- Terry Randall as Diana Chaice
- Patric Curwen as the author
- Michael Aldridge as Michael Garrod
- Paul Blake as the boss
- Wilfrid Caithness as the professor
- Howard Douglas as Badger
- Ben Williams as Spike
- Peter Gawthorne as Scotland Yard official
- Jack Simpson and his Sextet as themselves
- Ronne Coyles as boy
- Arthur Denton as hotel porter
- Alfred Harris as hotel guest
- Maureen Morton as singer

== Reception ==
The Monthly Film Bulletin wrote: "The story is very Boys' Own Paper stuff, and relies on a series of somewhat improbable happenings for its smooth running, but no doubt it will make a big hit with juvenile audiences whose critical faculty is not too strongly developed! The Artemus Boys give a good account of themselves, and quite outshine, in acting ability, the grown-up members of the cast."

Kine Weekly wrote: "The pictorial aspect of the film is delightful, but unfortunately its charming English exteriors are mot enough. The plot intrigues for a time, but its serial-like finale which follows a day at the races causes it to run to length and destroys much of its early fragrance and jolly spirit of adventure. Unless cut, it's likely to tax the patience of average adult audiences."
