= Music Hall (film) =

1934 film directed by John Baxter

- Opening titles
- Directed by: John Baxter
- Written by: John Baxter; H. Fowler Mear; Wallace Orton
- Produced by: Julius Hagen
- Starring: George Carney; Ben Field; Mark Daly
- Cinematography: Sydney Blythe; Ernest Palmer
- Edited by: Michael C. Chorlton; Lister Laurance
- Music by: W.L. Trytel
- Production company: Real Art Productions
- Distributed by: RKO Pictures
- Release date: 26 June 1934
- Running time: 73 minutes
- Country: United Kingdom
- Language: English

Music Hall (also known as Say it with Song) is a 1934 British musical drama film directed by John Baxter and starring George Carney, Ben Field and Mark Daly. It was written by Baxter, H. Fowler Mear and Wallace Orton, and produced by Julius Hagen as a quota quickie.

== Plot ==
Bill is the retired proprietor of a music hall, and hearing that it has fallen on hard times, takes charge and makes it a success again.

== Cast ==
- George Carney as Bill
- Ben Field as Steve
- Mark Daly as Scotty
- Helena Pickard as Lou
- Olive Sloane
- Wally Patch as Fred
- Derrick De Marney as Jim
- Peggy Novak
- Edgar Driver as Tich
- C. Denier Warren as Bendini
- Walter Amner
- Eve Chapman
- Wilson Coleman as Mr. Davis
- Bertram Dench
- G.H. Elliott
- Roddy Hughes
- Raymond Newell
- Gershom Parkington
- Macari's Dutch Serenaders
- The Sherman Fisher Girls
- Debroy Somers
- Harry Terry as Flies
- John Turnbull as Collins
- Freddie Watts as Bert Catchpole
- D.J. Williams
- Chester's Performing Dogs

== Production ==
The film was made at Twickenham Studios with sets designed by James A. Carter.

== Reception ==
The Daily Film Renter wrote: "Slender plot deals with rehabilitation of provincial vaudeville theatre by modern methods. Straightforward direction presents series of cockney interludes leading to replica of average twice nightly show, with Somers as highspot. Convincing back stage and characterisation are additional bids of picture that should prove good far for variety fans and the masses."

Kine Weekly wrote: "Slight story of a music-hall which has fallen on evil days and is brought back to success forms the introduction to a series of well-varied music-hall turns presented in a straightforward manner. The names of the artistes carry weight and should prove a draw in themselves. ... The opening, which shows the stage manager and hands depressed at the failure of the hall, is convincing in atmosphere, but it is very drawn out and over-dialogued. Characterisations are realistic, but the material with which the artistes have to work is distinctly thin."

Picture Show wrote: "George Carney as the stage-manager gives an excellent performance and is strongly supported by Mark Daly. The performers who make up the variety bill are first-rate. Among them must be mentioned Macari's Dutch Serenaders in their accordion act, the Gershom Parkington Quintette, Debroy Somers' Band and Chester's Performing Dogs. Good entertainment."
