= The Dragon of Pendragon Castle =

1950 British film by John Baxter

- Directed by: John Baxter
- Written by: Mary Cathcart Borer
- Produced by: John Baxter
- Starring: Leslie Bradley; David Hannaford; Lily Lapidus; Hubert Leslie
- Cinematography: Arthur Grant
- Edited by: Vi Burdon
- Music by: Kennedy Russell
- Production company: Elstree Independent Films Ltd
- Distributed by: General Film Distributors
- Release date: 1950 (United Kingdom)
- Running time: 52 min
- Country: Britain
- Language: English

The Dragon of Pendragon Castle is a 1950 English family film directed and produced by John Baxter and starring Leslie Bradley, David Hannaford, Lily Lapidus, and Hubert Leslie. It was written by Mary Cathcart Borer.

== Plot ==
Mr. Ferber is an old man living in Pendragon Castle along with his two grandchildren Bobby and Paddy who find a small dragon to heat their castle. The dragon helps them to find hidden treasure in the castle.

== Cast ==
- Leslie Bradley as Mr. Ferber
- David Hannaford as Bobby
- Lily Lapidus as Mrs. Morgan
- Hubert Leslie as Sir William Magnus
- Graham Moffatt as Paddy
- Robin Netscher as Peter Fielding
- Hilary Rennie as Judy Fielding
- C. Denier Warren as Mr. Morgan
- Jane Welsh as Mrs. Fielding

== Reception ==
The Monthly Film Bulletin wrote: "Produced for Mary Field's Children's Entertainment Films, this picture is one of several ... made with the laudable intention of providing children with entertainment of a different quality from the serial and the western. ... The production quality of the film is high, the photography being attractive, and the direction competent. The film, however, lacks the action and speed to be found in less worthy productions. It is doubtful whether children who enjoy the simple story will altogether appreciate the film's emphasis on character (notably the conceited child, played by David Miller), as opposed to simple action. The dragon is, moreover, a trifle too obviously merely a man in a cardboard suit. The film, in fact, seems to suffer from being an adult conception of what children want, rather than a picture atising naturally out of the type of situation which appeals to children."

Picturegoer wrote: "It is a lively affair with ... some agreeable children's performances. I liked the particularly solemn little David Hannaford, the only one who could understand dragon language. Graham Moffatt is a good handyman. This should be a certain favourite with the children."
