= Wilfred Walter =

English actor (1882–1958)

- Born: 2 March 1882; Ripon, West Riding of Yorkshire, England
- Died: 9 July 1958 (aged 76); Ashtead, Surrey, England
- Years active: 1935–56 (in films) 1918-50 (theatre)

Wilfred Walter (2 March 1882 in Ripon, West Riding of Yorkshire – 9 July 1958 in Ashtead, Surrey) was an English film and theatre actor, sometimes credited as Wilfrid Walter. He was born Franz Wilfrid Walter, son of the actor Richard Walter.

== Career ==
He was a Shakespearian actor during the first half of the 20th century, playing at the Theatre Royal, Drury Lane, Stratford-upon-Avon and the Old Vic, where his major roles included Mark Antony, Falstaff, Othello, Bottom and Titus Andronicus.

His best-known film role was as Max Slessor the eponymous inmate in the 1938 comedy Convict 99, who is mistaken for the prison governor Benjamin Twist (Will Hay). Walter also acted as the monstrous lumbering brute Jake, Dr Orloff's (Bela Lugosi) assistant in the 1939 film adaptation of the Edgar Wallace thriller The Dark Eyes of London.

== Selected filmography ==
- Old Roses (1935)
- Hearts of Humanity (1936)
- Owd Bob (1938)
- Convict 99 (1938)
- The Dark Eyes of London (1939)
- A Window in London (1940)
- Night Train to Munich (1940) (uncredited)
- Caesar and Cleopatra (1945) (uncredited)
- No Highway in the Sky (1951) (uncredited)
- Judgment Deferred (1952)
