= Laugh It Off =

Laugh It Off may refer to:

- Laugh It Off (1939 film), an American musical directed by Albert S. Rogell
- Laugh It Off (1940 film), a British musical comedy by John Baxter and Wallace Orton
- "Laugh It Off", a 2023 song by Post Malone from Austin
