= Kennedy Russell =

British composer of film scores (1883–1954)

- Born: 15 September 1883
- Died: 1 March 1954 (aged 70); Barnet, Hertfordshire, England
- Occupation: Composer
- Years active: 1935–1952 (film)

Kennedy Russell (15 September 1883 – 1 March 1954) was a British composer of film scores. He was employed by British National Films during the Second World War, and died aged 70 in 1954.

== Filmography ==
- Jimmy Boy (1935)
- Birds of a Feather (1936)
- Sunshine Ahead (1936)
- Men of Yesterday (1936)
- Hearts of Humanity (1936)
- The Song of the Road (1937)
- Talking Feet (1937)
- Riding High (1937)
- The Academy Decides (1937)
- Stepping Toes (1938)
- Secret Journey (1939)
- What Would You Do, Chums? (1939)
- Laugh It Off (1940)
- Old Mother Riley in Society (1940)
- Old Mother Riley in Business (1941)
- Crook's Tour (1941)
- Old Mother Riley's Ghosts (1941)
- Old Mother Riley's Circus (1941)
- The Common Touch (1941)
- Those Kids from Town (1942)
- Let the People Sing (1942)
- Salute John Citizen (1942)
- Asking for Trouble (1942)
- We'll Smile Again (1942)
- When We Are Married (1943)
- Old Mother Riley Detective (1943)
- Theatre Royal (1943)
- The Dummy Talks (1943)
- The Shipbuilders (1943)
- Dreaming (1944)
- Give Me the Stars (1945)
- Here Comes the Sun (1946)
- The Grand Escapade (1947)
- Nothing Venture (1948)
- The Dragon of Pendragon Castle (1950)
- The Second Mate (1950)
- Judgment Deferred (1952)

== Bibliography ==
- Brian McFarlane. Lance Comfort. Manchester University Press, 1999.
