= Let the People Sing (novel) =

1939 book by J.B. Priestley

- First edition (publ. Heinemann)
- Author: J. B. Priestley
- Language: English
- Publication date: 1939

Let the People Sing is a 1939 novel by the British writer J. B. Priestley. It examines civic politics and corruption in the small English town of Dunbury, where the music hall is due to be closed. It was adapted into a 1942 film Let the People Sing.

It was published Jan. 4, 1939.

It received a mostly negative review from Kirkus Reviews, which described the comedy as "farce", the characters as not quite sympathetic, and criticized the long speeches of the old professor.

== Bibliography ==
- Baxendale, John. Priestley's England: J.B. Priestley and English culture. Manchester University Press, 2007.
