= The Heart Within =

1957 British film by David Eady

- Original British quad poster
- Directed by: David Eady
- Screenplay by: Geoffrey Orme
- Story by: John Baxter
- Produced by: Jon Penington
- Starring: James Hayter; Clifford Evans; Earl Cameron; David Hemmings
- Cinematography: Ernest Palmer
- Edited by: Peter Pitt
- Music by: Vivian Comma; Edwin Astley
- Production company: Penington Eady Productions
- Distributed by: J. Arthur Rank Film Distributors (UK)
- Release date: July 1957; (UK)
- Running time: 61 minutes
- Country: United Kingdom
- Language: English

The Heart Within is a 1957 British second feature ('B') drama film directed by David Eady and starring James Hayter, Clifford Evans and David Hemmings. It was written by Geoffrey Orme. A Trinidadian dockside worker goes on the run in London suspected of the murder of another Trinidadian.

== Plot ==
West Indian Victor Conway, suspected of murder, is in hiding but is chanced upon by young Danny Willard. Believing him to be innocent, Danny and his grandfather try to help him. Learning the true identity of the murderer – drug dealer Matthew Johnson – Danny is kidnapped, but Victor rescues him, the murderer is killed during the struggle, and Victor is exonerated.

== Cast ==
- James Hayter as Grandfather Willard
- Clifford Evans as Matthew Johnson
- David Hemmings as Danny Willard
- Earl Cameron as Victor Conway
- Dan Jackson as Joe Martell
- Jack Stewart as Inspector Matheson
- Betty Cooper as Miss Trevor
- Gloria Ann Simpson as Violet
- Frank Singuineau as Bobo
- Pauline Henriques as Ella
- Janice Hughes as Dilli
- Denton De Gray as Gow
- Wally Thomas as sergeant
- Glynn Edwards as 1st constable
- Ivor Salter as 2nd constable
- Frank Pettitt as 3rd constable
- "The Kings of the Caribbean" steel band as musicians

== Critical reception ==
The Monthly Film Bulletin wrote "With some good camerawork, a London docks setting, and cautious but not unenterprising use of its West Indian characters, this film has a more convincing air than most thrillers of its type. Unfortunately, the effect is somewhat handicapped by an over-melodramatic and stereotyped climax and by some indifferent playing. Earl Cameron and David Hemmings play agreeably, though, as the West Indian and the cockney boy who befriends him. Background music is effectively provided by a West Indian steel band."

Kine Weekly wrote: "The picture is schoolboyish, but never plays down to youngsters. David Hemmings definitely does his stuff as Danny, Earl Cameron has a cakewalk role as the luckless Victor, Clifford Evans is disarming as villain Johnson and Betty Cooper registers as Miss Trevor. There are moments of genuine suspense and a showmanlike finale. The London atmosphere rings true, and the Kings of the Caribbean provide appropriate calypso music."

Picturegoer wrote: "The mating of the colour problem in London and a schoolboy crime yarn is one of those strange screen notions that might just come off. But it needs abler film makers than these to do so. ... In true Saturday matinée fashion, as a rousing boy's adventure it's amateurish but exciting. Trouble is that one or other subject seems misplaced."

The Daily Film Renter wrote: "Good marks to this production for attempting, as it tells its simple story, to put the problem of West Indians in this country into some sort of sympathetic perspective. Performances are convincing and East London exteriors are well utilised, but general production values are only average, and the motivation and story line are too naive to appeal to more than unsophisticated family audiences. One added attraction is the use of a Caribbean Steel Band to provide atmospheric background music."

In British Sound Films: The Studio Years 1928–1959 David Quinlan rated the film as "average", writing: "Variably acted, quite pleasing racial-problem thriller."

TV Guide wrote "Well-acted presentation of a man accused of murder because of the color of his skin...Intriguing effort given power mainly through the handling of the theme of prejudice."

Chilbnall and McFarlane in The British 'B' Film wrote that the film has "irreproachable attitudes to racial problems at the time when these were surfacing in Britain."
