= Fortune Lane =

1947 British film by John Baxter

- Directed by: John Baxter
- Written by: Geoffrey Orme; Mary Cathcart Borer
- Based on: original story by Gunby Hadath
- Produced by: John Baxter; Barbara K. Emary
- Starring: Douglas Barr; Brian Weske; Billy Thatcher
- Cinematography: Jo Jago
- Edited by: Vi Burdon
- Production company: Elstree Independent Films
- Distributed by: General Film Distributors (UK)
- Release dates: 16 December 1947 (London, England)
- Running time: 60 minutes
- Country: United Kingdom
- Language: English

Fortune Lane is a 1947 British family drama film directed by John Baxter and starring Douglas Barr, Billy Thatcher and Brian Weske.

== Plot ==
A boy tries to raise money so he can train to be an engineer, but ends up giving the money to a friend so he can visit an ill relative.

== Cast ==
- Douglas Barr as Peter Quentin
- Billy Thatcher as John
- Brian Weske as Tim
- Angela Glynne as Margaret Quentin
- George Carney as Mr Quentin
- Nell Ballantyne as Mrs Quentin
- Anthony Holles as Mr Carpenter

== Critical reception ==
The Monthly Film Bulletin wrote: "The sound moral tone of the film is skillfully overlaid by an interesting and plausible story which should be found enjoyable by all children. Douglas Barr is extremely good as Peter, and Brian Weske gives a sensitive and intelligent performance as the appealing young orphan Tim."

TV Guide wrote "Pleasant children's film is a cut above the usually awful run," and rated it two out of five stars.
