= Birds of a Feather (1936 film) =

1936 British film by John Baxter

- George Robey and Horace Hodges in the film
- Directed by: John Baxter
- Written by: Gerald Elliott; George Foster (play); Con West
- Produced by: John Barter
- Starring: George Robey; Horace Hodges; Eve Lister
- Cinematography: Ernest Palmer
- Music by: Kennedy Russell
- Production companies: Baxter and Barter Productions
- Distributed by: Universal Pictures
- Release date: 13 April 1936
- Running time: 70 minutes
- Country: United Kingdom
- Language: English

Birds of a Feather is a 1936 British comedy film directed by John Baxter and starring George Robey, Horace Hodges and Eve Lister. It was written by Gerald Elliott and Con West based on the 1933 play A Rift in the Loot by George Foster, and was made at Shepperton Studios as a quota quickie.

== Synopsis ==
Henry Wortle, a sausage-making tycoon with social ambitions, rents a castle from Lord Cheverton, an impoverished aristocrat, having heard of a legend of hidden treasure.

== Cast ==
- George Robey as Henry Wortle
- Horace Hodges as Lord Cheverton
- Eve Lister as Lady Susan
- Jack Melford as Rudolph
- Veronica Brady as Mrs. Wortle
- Julian Royce as Warrington
- C. Denier Warren as Taylor
- Diana Beaumont as May Wortle
- Ian Wilson as Peter
- Fred Hearne as Herbert
- Billy Percy as Horace
- Sebastian Shaw as Jack Wortle
- Charles Mortimer as Sir Michael

== Reception ==
The Monthly Film Bulletin wrote: "George Robey, as the sausage-king, makes the most of his chances, and Eve Lister as the heroine is attractive. The direction and photography are adequate. There is nothing in the film to raise it above the average but George Robey's admirers will not be disappointed."

The Daily Film Renter wrote: "Robey is, of course, the picture's strongest entertainment asset, his well-known comedy antics finding an excellent outlet in the role of the ebullient Wortle. The fun-maker is a sheer joy to watch, particularly in close-ups, which allow his inimitable facial expressions to be enjoyed to the full. Seldom absent from the screen, he keeps the fun gomg strong throughout."

Kine Weekly wrote: "Admirable restraint has been exercised, lifting the production well out of the slapstick class and avoiding the hilarious, except in one sequence, in which crooks and police fight in the vault in almost total darkness. Skilful characterisation successfully carries almost the whole burden of the film."

Picture Show wrote: "George Robey has an ideal part of which he takes full advantage; his performance is excellent, Horace Hodges as the broken earl and Eve Lister as his daughter are good. Veronica Brady as the millionaire's wife has been well cast, Julian Royce is noteworthy as the comedy butier. ... Excellent comedy entertainment."

Variety wrote: "George Robey is, as always, Robey. He still laughs at his own efforts to generate humor and, despite 'keeping the party clean,' he utters one tag for the finish that contains a word not regarded here as fit for decent society. True the word is slurred over, but there can be no mistaking the intent. He plays the role of the vulgarian sausage manufacturer, and looks it."
