= Old Mother Riley in Society =

- Directed by: John Baxter
- Written by: Barbara K. Emary; Austin Melford; Bridget Boland; Mary Cathcart Borer
- Story by: Kitty McShane
- Produced by: John Baxter
- Starring: Arthur Lucan; Kitty McShane; John Stuart
- Cinematography: James Wilson
- Edited by: Michael C. Chorlton
- Music by: Kennedy Russell
- Production company: British National Films
- Distributed by: Anglo-American Film Corporation
- Release date: 27 July 1940 (UK)
- Running time: 81 minutes
- Country: United Kingdom
- Language: English

Old Mother Riley in Society is a low budget 1940 black and white British comedy film, directed by John Baxter, and starring Arthur Lucan and Kitty McShane. It was written by Barbara K. Emary, Austin Melford, Bridget Boland and Mary Cathcart Borer from a story by McShane. It is the fifth in the long running Old Mother Riley series, and features the screen debut of Jimmy Clitheroe as the boot boy in a high society household.

== Plot ==
Old Mother Riley does the laundry for the dancers in the pantomime "Aladdin", where her daughter Kitty works as a chorus girl. Sneaking a peek at the show one day, Mother Riley accidentally pops up through a trap door onto the stage. Accosted by the angry star, Mother Riley’s belligerent responses have the audience in stitches. Outraged, the star walks out, leaving Kitty to take over the leading role to great success.

Kitty is congratulated after the show by wealthy high society boy Tony Morgan, and the couple start to fall in love. Tony and Kitty eventually marry and move into the Morgan family mansion taking Mother Riley with them, as Kitty’s personal maid. During a swanky party to introduce Kitty to Tony's upper class friends, rumours start up about Kitty’s former stage career. Kitty is about to confess her past, but Mother Riley — fearing this will have damaging effect on her daughter’s social standing — causes a disruption, then leaves a goodbye note and vanishes.

Kitty tells Tony the truth, and the couple hire a detective to trace Mother Riley, but without success. Mother Riley drifts through a series of dead-end jobs after separating from Kitty, and ends up living in a dingy hostel and picking up degrading casual work as a dishwasher. A chance encounter with old friend Tug Mulligan results in her reunion with Kitty; Tony’s family explains they’re not "high society" after all, merely nouveau riche. "We made our money in sausages", declares Lady Morgan; "then we're all friends together", replies Mother Riley.

== Cast ==
- Arthur Lucan as Old Mother Riley
- Kitty McShane as Kitty
- John Stuart as Tony Morgan
- Minnie Rayner as hotel washer-up
- Charles Victor as Sir John Morgan
- Ruth Maitland
- Athole Stewart as Duke
- Peggy Novak
- Dennis Wyndham as Tug Mulligan
- Margaret Halstan as Duchess
- Aubrey Dexter as Nugent

== Production ==
Lance Comfort was assistant director.

== Critical reception ==
The Daily Film Renter wrote: "Hilarious knockabout fun, robust wiseracking and substantial leavening of homely maternal sentiment by Arthur Lucan. ... Substantial entertainment, well mounted and photographed, introducing lavish stage pantomime, slices of doss-house existence, strip-tease, and other diverse facets. Starring team surpass previous comicalities."

Kine Weekly wrote: "Robust Cinderella romantic comedy, presenting an artless but proven mixture of slapstick, sentiment and song. Maternal sacrifice is the theme of the ingenuous story, and it is plugged with no little showmanship in the two extremes of society. Contrast is, in fact, half the entertainment. The other is Arthur Lucan, best of all stage, screen and music-hall dames. The support is adequate the staging ambitious, and the vocal score shrewd. Capital comedy bet for the family and industrial masses, one with box-office star and title values."

Picturegoer wrote: "Same mixture of slapstick and sentiment interspersed with song which charactenses the 'Mother Riley' series. Gags are rather worn and the plot is the old one of the uneducated woman who wants her daughter, Kitty, to get on. In this case the mother is a laundry woman at a theatre, and the daughter a chorus girl. Arthur Lucan repeats his familiar woman impersonation. Kitty McShane is weak as Kitty."
