= Mary Merrall =

English actress (1890–1973)

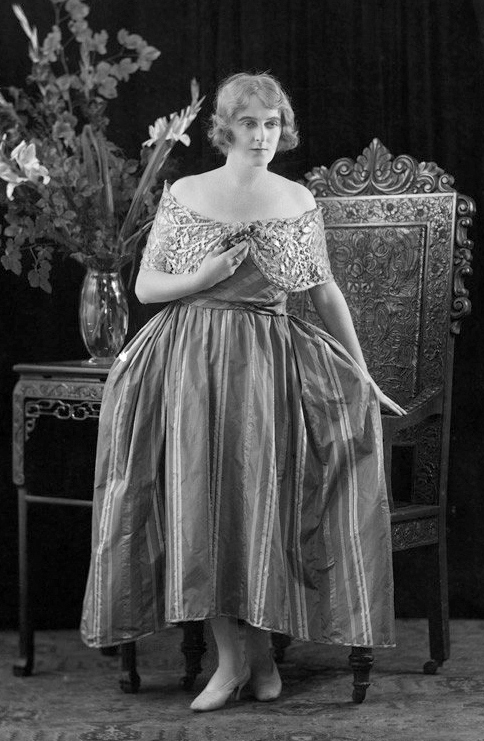
- Merrall in 1922
- Born: Elsie Lloyd; 5 January 1890; Liverpool, Lancashire, England
- Died: 31 August 1973 (aged 83); Brighton, Sussex, England
- Occupation: Actress
- Years active: 1907–1973
- Spouses: John Bouch Hissey (m. 1909; div. 1914); Ion Swinley (ann. 1927); Franklin Dyall (m. 1929; died 1950)

Mary Merrall (born Elsie Lloyd; 5 January 1890 – 31 August 1973) was an English actress whose career of over 60 years encompassed stage, film and television work.

== Stage career ==
Merrall's stage career started in her teens, making her first stage appearance in 1907, as Queenie Merrall, and for the rest of her life she remained a well-known and respected stage actress. Although she was based in London, she often appeared in other prestigious venues in the UK such as the Birmingham Repertory Theatre and the Theatre Royal, Glasgow.

Among her most famous stage roles were Lady Macbeth in a controversial but influential 1928 modern-dress production by Barry Jackson which opened in Birmingham before transferring to London's Royal Court Theatre, and Mrs. Danvers in Daphne du Maurier's Rebecca at the Strand Theatre in 1940. Her stage career also took her to the United States, where she appeared in Canaries Sometimes Sing (Frederick Lonsdale) in New York and Chicago in 1930.

== Film and television ==
With the exception of an appearance in a 1932 quota quickie Men of Steel, Merrall did not make the move into films until the 1940s. She was given leading roles in the 1940 Irish-set drama Dr. O'Dowd (now classed as a lost film) and the film adaptation of Walter Greenwood's Love on the Dole the following year. The 1940s then brought a steady stream of good film parts including her best-remembered roles as Mrs. Foley in the 1945 classic Dead of Night and Mrs. Nickleby in the Alberto Cavalcanti-directed 1947 screen version of Nicholas Nickleby. Into the 1950s Merrall also landed a string of diverse roles in films such as Encore (1951), prison drama The Weak and the Wicked (1954), comedy The Belles of St. Trinian's (1954) and harrowing World War II drama The Camp on Blood Island (1958).

As film work began to dry up from the late 1950s, Merrall increasingly found work in television, appearing in several productions for the ITV drama strands Play of the Week and ITV Playhouse as well as guest appearances in popular series such as Sir Francis Drake, Dixon of Dock Green, The Saint, The Avengers, Randall and Hopkirk (Deceased) and the UFO episode "A Question of Priorities".

== Private life ==
Merrall married three times. Her first marriage to John Bouch Hissey in 1909 ended acrimoniously in 1914 amid a great deal of public and media interest, after Hissey brought a highly publicised divorce suit alleging infidelity on Merrall's part, naming several men including famous music hall star Albert Whelan. Merrall's second marriage, to noted Shakespearean actor Ion Swinley, was also dissolved in 1927. Her third marriage, to fellow actor Franklin Dyall, lasted until Dyall's death in 1950.

Merrall died in Brighton on 31 August 1973, aged 83.

== Partial filmography ==
- Fatal Fingers (1916) - Irene Lambton
- The Manxman (1917) - Tom's girl
- Duke's Son (1920) - Billy Honour
- Men of Steel (1932) - Mrs. Harg
- Dr. O'Dowd (1940) - Constantia
- You Will Remember (1941) - London Landlady (uncredited)
- Love on the Dole (1941) - Mrs. Hardcastle
- Squadron Leader X (1943) - Miss Thorndike
- Dead of Night (1945) - Mrs. Foley (segment "Linking Story")
- Pink String and Sealing Wax (1945) - Mrs. Ellen Sutton
- This Man Is Mine (1946) - Mrs. Jarvis
- The Life and Adventures of Nicholas Nickleby (1947) - Mrs. Nickleby
- They Made Me a Fugitive (1947) - Aggie
- The Three Weird Sisters (1948) - Isobel Morgan-Vaughan
- Badger's Green (1949) - Mrs. Wetherby
- For Them That Trespass (1949) - Mrs. Drew
- Trio (1950) - Miss Atkin (uncredited)
- The Late Edwina Black (1951) - Lady Southdale
- Encore (1951) - Flora Penezzi (segment "Gigolo and Gigolette")
- Out of True (1951, Short) - Granny
- Judgment Deferred (1952) - Lady Musterby
- Meet Me Tonight (1952) - Mrs. Rockett (segment "Fumed Oak: An Unpleasant Comedy")
- The Pickwick Papers (1952) - Grandma Wardle
- Three's Company (1953) - Mrs. Bailey (segment "Take a Number' story)
- The Weak and the Wicked (1954) - Mrs. Skinner
- Duel in the Jungle (1954) - Mrs. Henderson
- The Belles of St. Trinian's (1954) - Miss Buckland
- The Green Carnation (1954) - Mrs. Rydon-Smith
- The Last Moment (1954) - Housekeeper (segment: 'The Last Moment')
- Destination Milan (1954)
- It's Great to Be Young (1956) - Miss Wyvern, School Mistress
- Campbell's Kingdom (1957) - Miss Ruth
- Rx Murder (1958) - Miss Bettyhill
- The Camp on Blood Island (1958) - Helen
- Spare the Rod (1961) - Miss Fogg
- Bitter Harvest (1963) - Aunt Louisa
- The Amorous Adventures of Moll Flanders (1965) - A Lady
- Who Killed the Cat? (1966) - Janet Bowering
- Futtocks End (1970) - The Aunt
