= Flood Tide (1934 film) =

1934 film directed by John Baxter

- Opening titles
- Directed by: John Baxter
- Written by: Anson Dyer; Harry Fowler Mear
- Produced by: Julius Hagen
- Starring: George Carney; Janice Adair; Minnie Rayner
- Cinematography: Ernest Palmer
- Edited by: Lister Laurance
- Music by: William Trytel
- Production company: Real Art Productions
- Distributed by: RKO Pictures
- Release date: 27 November 1934
- Running time: 63 minutes
- Country: United Kingdom
- Language: English

Flood Tide is a 1934 British drama film directed by John Baxter and starring George Carney, Janice Adair and Minnie Rayner. It was written by Anson Dyer and Harry Fowler Mear.

== Synopsis ==
A retiring lockkeeper and his wife are concerned that their son Ted Salter, who is serving in the Royal Navy should settle down and start a family. They hope that this will be with his childhood sweetheart Betty the daughter of their old friend Captain Bill Buckett who operates a boat on the River Thames. However Ted has taken up with a flirtatious barmaid, at one point even risking arrest as a deserter because of her before reconciling with Betty. The film ends with Bill Buckett triumphing in an annual regatta.

== Cast ==
- George Carney as Captain Bill Buckett
- Janice Adair as Betty Buckett
- Minnie Rayner as Sarah Salter
- Wilson Coleman as Ben Salter
- Leslie Hatton as Ted Salter
- Peggy Novak as Mabel Pringle
- Mark Daly as Scotty
- Edgar Driver as Titch
- Wilfred Benson as Addock
- William Fazan as Sir Thomas Maitland
- Bertram Dench as Charles Tupper

== Production ==
The film was made at Twickenham Studios as a quota quickie for release by RKO Pictures. The sets were designed by James A. Carter, the regular Twickenham art director. Many scenes of the film were shot on location along the River Thames.

== Reception ==
The Daily Film Renter wrote: "Somewhat rambling story of Thamesside folk ... Development takes in several side issues, with result plot never focuses into coherent whole. Assets include shots of well-known Thames landmarks, simple humanity of characters, and race climax. Fair booking for the masses."

Picturegoer wrote: "Very slight and artificial story which sets out to be a saga of the Thames but only succeeds in providing conventional drama with a Cook's tour of the river as a scenic background. The real atmosphere of the Thames side and its dwellers is never satisfactorily achieved. George Carney, not too well cast, does well as the captain of a barge, while his friends are efficiently portrayed by Minnie Rayner and Wilson Coleman; Love interest is quite capably handled by Janice Adair and Leslie Hatton."

Picture Show wrote: "An unpretentious little story of the people who earn their living by the Thames, and live on the river as well. It is simply told and competently acted, with some delightful photography."

== See also ==
- The Bargee
