= Wilson Coleman =

British actor (1873–1940)

Coleman in 1938

Wilson Coleman (1873–1940) was a British actor.

He started his stage career in 1891, playing juvenile and heavy parts. He worked with Barry Jackson for five years. He toured both North and South America as well as South Africa. His hobbies were anything mechanical, electrical and optical, giving him the knowledge to invent his own camera for taking moving pictures. This led to him being in the photographic section of the RFC in World War I.

== Partial filmography ==
- Doss House (1933)
- Kentucky Minstrels (1934)
- Borrow a Million (1934)
- Music Hall (1934)
- Flood Tide (1934)
- Say It with Flowers (1934)
- Lest We Forget (1934)
- Blue Smoke (1935)
- A Real Bloke (1935)
- Sexton Blake and the Mademoiselle (1935)
- Mother, Don't Rush Me (1936)
- Blind Man's Bluff (1936)
- Toilers of the Sea (1936)
- Doctor Syn (1937)
- Alf's Button Afloat (1938)
- Stepping Toes (1938)
- Where's That Fire? (1940)

== Sources ==
- Film Star Who's Who on the Screen 1938
