= Olga Lindo =

English actress (1899–1968)

- in An Inspector Calls (1954)
- Born: 13 July 1899; London, England, United Kingdom
- Died: 7 May 1968 (aged 68); London, England, United Kingdom
- Occupation: Actress
- Years active: 1913–62

Olga Lindo (13 July 1899 – 7 May 1968) was an English actress. She was the daughter of Frank Lindo, a well-known actor, manager and author. She made her stage debut at the Theatre Royal, Drury Lane on 26 December 1913. She later joined her father's touring company in a range of roles. For Basil Dean she appeared in R.U.R in 1923, and in 1925 she gave what The Times described as a formidable performance as Sadie Thompson in Maugham's Rain at the Garrick Theatre. She toured in South Africa in 1930 and 1934 in a variety of parts. Her repertoire ranged from the classics to farce. In 1935 she played Abigail Hill in Norman Ginsbury's historical work Viceroy Sarah. She also acted in films.

== Partial filmography ==
- The Shadow Between (1931) - Nell Baker
- Royal Cavalcade (1935) - Tourist
- The Case of Gabriel Perry (1935) - Mrs. Perry
- Dark World (1935) - Eleanor
- The Last Journey (1936) - Mrs. Holt
- A Romance in Flanders (1937) - Madame Vlandermaere
- What Men Live By (1938, short) - Martha
- Luck of the Navy (1938) - Mrs. Rance
- The Stars Look Down (1939) - Mrs. Sunley
- Return to Yesterday (1940) - Grace Sambourne
- Alibi (1942) - Mlle. Loureau
- When We Are Married (1943) - Maria Helliwell
- Time Flies (1944) - Queen Elizabeth
- Give Me the Stars (1945) - Lady Hester
- The Rake's Progress (1945) - Woman in Palais de Danse (uncredited)
- Night Boat to Dublin (1946) - Mrs. Coleman
- I See a Dark Stranger (1946) - Mrs. Edwards
- Bedelia (1946) - Mrs. Bennett
- The Phantom Shot (1947) - Mrs. Robson
- Things Happen at Night (1947) - Hilda Prescott
- Obsession (1949) - Mrs. Humphries
- Train of Events (1949) - Mrs. Bailey (segment "The Prisoner-of-War")
- The Twenty Questions Murder Mystery (1950) - Olive Tavey
- An Inspector Calls (1954) - Mrs. Birling
- Misalliance (1954) - Mrs. Tarleton
- Raising a Riot (1955) - Aunt Maud
- Yield to the Night (1956) - Hill
- The Extra Day (1956) - Mrs. Bliss
- Woman in a Dressing Gown (1957) - Manageress
- Make Mine a Million (1959) - Mrs. Burgess
- Sapphire (1959) - Mrs. Harris
- Persuasion (1960–1961, TV mini-series) - Mrs. Musgrove
- Fog for a Killer (1962) - Mrs. Mallon
- Dr Crippen (1962) - Mrs Arditti

== Radio ==
- The Dark Tower (1946)
