= Old Mother Riley's Circus =

1941 film directed by Thomas Bentley

- British trade ad poster
- Directed by: Thomas Bentley
- Written by: Barbara K. Emary; Geoffrey Orme; Con West; Arthur Lucan
- Produced by: Wallace Orton
- Starring: Arthur Lucan; Kitty McShane; John Longden; Edgar Driver
- Cinematography: James Wilson
- Edited by: Clifford Boote; Jack Harris
- Music by: Kennedy Russell
- Production company: British National Films
- Distributed by: Anglo-American Film Corporation
- Release date: 9 February 1941
- Running time: 80 minutes
- Country: United Kingdom
- Language: English

Old Mother Riley's Circus is a 1941 British comedy film directed by Thomas Bentley and starring Arthur Lucan, Kitty McShane and John Longden. It was written by Barbara K. Emary, Geoffrey Orme, Con West and Lucan.

Old Mother Riley takes over a struggling circus and makes a huge success of it. The trade ad poster proclaims, "A LAUGH - A YELL - A ROAR - A LUCANQUAKE!"

The film was made at the Rock Studios in Elstree by British National Films. It was the final film by Bentley, who had been a leading British director during the silent era and early sound era.

== Plot summary ==
Old Mother Riley is the ringmaster after taking over a big top with flagging fortunes. Although the circus is plagued by the disappearance of its owner, and the bailiffs are at the door, the show somehow manages to go on. Money starts to pour in, financial disaster is avoided, and Mother Riley discovers her long-lost daughter is in fact the star of the show.

== Cast ==
- Arthur Lucan as Mrs. Riley
- Kitty McShane as Kitty Riley
- John Longden as Bill
- Edgar Driver as Bobo the clown
- Beckett Bould as Davis
- Roy Emerton as Santley, circus owner
- O. B. Clarence as lawyer
- Syd Crossley as the bailiff
- Hector Abbas as Wizista, the hypnotist
- W. T. Holland as character
- John Turnbullas cinema manager
- Iris Vandeleur as landlady
- Ben Williams as Lucky
- Nora Gordon as 1st charwoman
- Jennie Gregson as 2nd charwoman

== Production ==
Filming took place in 1941.

== Reception ==
=== Box office ===
According to Kine Weekly the film's box office performance at the British box office in February 1942 was "by no means disgraceful".

=== Critical ===
The Monthly Film Bulletin wrote: "The naive situations and dialogue appear to have been concocted merely as a background for the antics of the leading character, other members of the cast being given little scope for acting, and in spite of the unbounded energy of Arthur Lucan as Mother Riley, the film is not very amusing, though children will enjoy the circus acts, of which there are quite a number."

Kine Weekly wrote: "Arthur Lucan is street-singer, usherette, phoney countess, fortuneteller, ringmaster, gambler and mother as Old Mother Riley, and his exuberant versatility is one of the main pillars of the entertainment. Kitty McShane is adequate as Kitty, and John Longden and Roy Emerton are the best of the supporting players. There are also a number of first-rate circus acts. The story is, in spite of its simplicity and occasional theatricality, more than capable of holding its own. With all the star's tremendous fooling and the richness of the circus backgrounds, happy and human sentiment pleasantly protrude."

TV Guide said, "the usual padding that plagues the "Old Mother Riley" series is avoided thanks to a jolly atmosphere and some decent acts."
