= Those Kids from Town =

1942 film by Lance Comfort

- Directed by: Lance Comfort
- Written by: Adrian Alington
- Based on: 1940 novel These Our Strangers by Adrian Alington
- Produced by: Richard Vernon
- Starring: Harry Fowler; George Cole; Percy Marmont; Ronald Shiner; Charles Victor
- Cinematography: James Wilson
- Music by: Kennedy Russell
- Production company: British National Films
- Release date: 1942
- Running time: 82 minutes
- Country: United Kingdom
- Language: English

Those Kids from Town is a 1942 British black-and-white, comedy-drama propaganda film directed by Lance Comfort and starring George Cole, Harry Fowler, Percy Marmont, Ronald Shiner and Charles Victor. It was produced by Richard Vernon and presented by British National Films and Anglo-American Film Corporation. It was adapted for the screen by Adrian Alington from his 1940 novel These Our Strangers, and deals with the experiences of a group of wartime evacuee children from London, sent to safety in a rural village, and their interaction with the host community. Of the juvenile actors involved, Fowler (making his screen debut here aged 15) and Cole (then 16) would go on to successful adult careers.

== Synopsis ==
On the outbreak of the Second World War, a group of six children from the East End of London are evacuated to the village of Payling Green. The boisterous pair Charlie and Ern are lodged with the local vicar and proceed to torment, mock and terrorise his sensitive and delicate son. They then get involved in petty-thieving and vandalism, before being taken under the protective wing of a local female novelist with progressive social views.

Sisters Liz and Maud are placed with a pair of old-fashioned and stern spinster sisters and chafe under the constrictions of the discipline imposed on them. They become increasingly unhappy until they are taken in by the local Earl, who discovers Liz's singing talent and proposes to sponsor her to train professionally. Liz's parents are called to visit and her father at first bridles at the interference of a member of the gentry in his daughter's life, before being brought round to the view that her talent should be nurtured.

== Cast ==
- George Cole as Charlie
- Harry Fowler as Ern
- Percy Marmont as Earl
- Shirley Lenner as Liz
- Angela Glynne as Maud
- Jeanne de Casalis as Sheila
- Charles Victor as Harry, the vicar
- Olive Sloane as vicar's wife
- Stanley Escane as Stan
- Leslie Adams as Arthur
- Dane Gordon as vicar's son
- Maire O'Neill as housekeeper
- Ronald Shiner as Mr. Bert Burns
- Josephine Wilson as Mrs. Burns
- Hay Petrie as Ted Roberts
- D. J. Williams as Butler
- Sydney King as Donald
- Bransby Williams as Uncle Sid

== Reception ==
=== Box office ===
According to Kinematograph Weekly the film was a "long shot" at the British box office in August 1942. The same magazine later called the film a "surprise hit" and claimed British National were thinking of making a sequel Those Kids from Town Again.

=== Critical ===
The Monthly Film Bulletin wrote: "A good deal of thought has obviously been given to this story and as many sides as possible of the absorbing question of dealing with evacuee children have been covered, with, of course, the one exception of those who take to their foster parents naturally and lead a healthy but uneventful life. It is therefore a pity that Dane Gordon is allowed to overact so sadly as the Vicar's son and amusing points occasionally flogged by repetition. There is some excellent work by the rest of the children, especially from Angela Glynfie as Young Maud and George Cole as Charlie. The comedy is natural in the main and should entertain all classes of audiences very satisfactorily. An admirable cast of grownups play second fiddle to 'those kids' more than competently."

Kine Weekly said it had "some good moments and a certain amount of child psychology, but it hardly presents a good case for evacuation". ... It is difficult to find out what the central theme is aiming at. The tough kids get away with it all the time, so the moral is hardly a good one. It is mainly because the juveniles act so capably that the material gets over as well as it does. Arguments between Lizzie's class-conscious father and the squire are trite and seem dated in effect. Sentiment concerning Lizzie and her sister is quite good and not unduly overstressed. The trouble is that the picture's continuity and purpose are both very weak."

The Daily Film Renter wrote: "Commendable popular entertainment. ... There is ample fun and considerable cleverness in a series of burlesques of the rough and tough methods of the Dead End Kids; while some fascinating singing comes from Shirley Lenner as the elder of two sisters billeted on a hard spinster."

Cinema praised "sympathetic direction...(which) cleverly sets wartime atmosphere and..a convincing picture of reactions of parents, children and hosts", but felt the film faltered badly in its later stages by "resorting to frank slapstick".
