= Give Me the Stars =

1945 British film by Maclean Rogers

- Sheet music for title song
- Directed by: Maclean Rogers
- Screenplay by: Austin Melford; Maclean Rogers
- Based on: story by A. Hilarius & Rudolph Bernauer
- Produced by: Frederic Zelnik
- Starring: Leni Lynn; Will Fyffe; Jackie Hunter
- Cinematography: James Wilson
- Edited by: Donald Ginsberg
- Music by: Kennedy Russell
- Production company: British National Films
- Distributed by: Anglo-American Film Corporation (UK)
- Release date: 14 May 1945 (UK)
- Running time: 90 minutes
- Country: United Kingdom
- Language: English

Give Me the Stars is a 1945 British musical drama film directed by Maclean Rogers and starring Leni Lynn, Will Fyffe, Jackie Hunter and Olga Lindo. It was written by Austin Melford and Rogers based on a story by A. Hilarius and Rudolph Bernauer.

American Toni Martin travels to Scotland and finds herself looking after her cranky grandfather Hector MacTavish.

== Plot ==
Eighteen-year-old American singer Toni Martin arrives in London in search of her music-hall star grandfather Hector MacTavish. She locates him, only to find that his fortunes have taken a turn for the worse, and his love for whisky has made him a drunken busker, entertaining queues outside theatres. On one occasion she stands in for him. With the help of an American entertainer she met on the journey to England, Toni lands a job as a singer and finds love. MacTavish, now teetotal thanks to Toni's encouragement, is a star once more, at a Christmas party for poor children.

== Cast ==
- Leni Lynn as Toni Martin
- Will Fyffe as Hector MacTavish
- Jackie Hunter as Lyle Mitchell
- Olga Lindo as Lady Hester
- Emrys Jones as Jack Ross
- Margaret Vyner as Patricia Worth
- Anthony Holles as Achille Lebrun
- Grace Arnold as Mrs Gossage
- Patric Curwen as Sir John Worth
- Robert Griffith as Dick Winter
- Johnnie Schofield as Ted James
- Janet Morrison as secretary
- Hal Gordon as taxi driver
- Joss Ambler as George Burns
- Hilda Bayley as Mr Ross
- Ben Williams as Grant

== Critical reception ==
The Monthly Film Bulletin wrote: "Leni Lynn, as Toni, sings well but acts unconvincingly; Will Fyffe makes a good MacTavish; and Jackie Hunter, as an American comedian friend of Toni's, works hard, if not very successfully, for laughs. Direction is adequate, though the film moves too slowly, particularly in its more naive and sentimental sequences. The supporting cast is a good one, but the situations are all too obvious to test them."

Kine Weekly wrote: "Crowded musical comedy drama ... It employs every conceivable cliche, but happily the majority of its players rise superior to story material. Leni Lynn's singing, done proud by the recordists, and Will Fyfie's inimitable humour alone justify the ample expenditure of celluloid. And there's mischievous and likeable Cockney kids for good measure. ... The play leaves absolutely nothing out ... but although it strenuously tries to please all classes and tastes it limits its appeal in the end by filling its transparent cup a little too full. Nevertheless, its co-stars decanter its palatable mild, and never bitter, with practised hand. So does its director. It'll slake unsophisticated thirsts all right."

Picturegoer wrote: "Musical comedy drama which has all the well-known ingredients relative to its type, but it still does not jell particularly. ... Leni Lynn is in excellent form histrionically and vocally, while Jackie Hunter is apt to overact."
