= The Second Mate =

1950 British film by John Baxter

- Opening titles
- Directed by: John Baxter
- Written by: Anson Dyer; Barbara K. Emary; Jack Francis; Geoffrey Orme
- Produced by: John Baxter; Barbara K. Emary
- Starring: Gordon Harker; Graham Moffatt
- Cinematography: Arthur Grant
- Edited by: Vi Burdon
- Music by: Kennedy Russell
- Production company: Elstree Independent Films
- Distributed by: Associated British-Pathé
- Release date: 27 February 1950
- Running time: 76 minutes
- Country: United Kingdom
- Language: English

The Second Mate is a 1950 British crime film directed by John Baxter and starring Gordon Harker, Graham Moffatt and David Hannaford. It was written by Anson Dyer, Barbara K. Emary, Jack Francis and Geoffrey Orme It was made at Southall Studios.

== Cast ==
- Gordon Harker as Bill Tomkins
- Graham Moffatt as Paddy
- David Hannaford as Bobby
- Beryl Walkeley as Kate
- Charles Sewell as Joe
- Anne Blake as fortune teller
- Charles Heslop as Hogan
- Jane Welsh as Mrs. Mead
- Howard Douglas as Dusty
- Pauline Drewett as Pauline
- Tom Fallon as police officer
- Hamilton Keene as Bishop
- Pat Keogh as Spike
- Sam Kydd as Wheeler
- Johnnie Schofield

== Reception ==
The Monthly Film Bulletin wrote: "The Second Mate is an economically made comedy thriller, designed to introduce the comedy team of Gordon Harker, Graham Moffat and David Hannaford, and made partly on Thames-side locations. The intention is commendable but The Second Mate, unfortunately, suffers from rather inexpert direction, a confused story (slow moving until the final chase scenes) and a comedy technique which relies over much on the familiar mannerisms of Gordon Harker."

Kine Weekly wrote: "Juvenile adventure comedy melodrama. ... it is young David Hannaford's engaging performance in what is tantamount to the lead, and the picturesque backgrounds, rather than the extravagant plot that prevent it from shipping water. Disarmingly ingenuous, it should get over in other than tough joints. Acceptable screen 'children's hour'."

Picturegoer wrote: "If you like seeing childre being precocious and rude to their elders, you may appreciate this film. Otherwise, I don't think you'll find it very funny. For the film tries to win most of its laughs through young David Hannaford. He answers back, makes faces when spoken to, and generally puts on the big act. The story doesn't help, It's slow and its action is not fully explained until nearly an hour has passed. ... To give the players due credit, though, they all do well in face of the difficulties. A redeeming feature of the film is the Thames-side scenery, from Shepperton to Tower Bridge. It's all too rare that the British countryside is featured prominently in British films."

Picture Show wrote: "Delightfully set on the Thames, this is a diverting blend of dirty work and good clean fun ... Agreeable entertainment with Gordon Harker scoring as the Cockney barge-master."

In British Sound Films: The Studio Years 1928–1959 David Quinlan rated the film as "mediocre", writing: "Slow, rather crudely made comedy-thriller that even Harker's experience can't save."
