= The Academy Decides =

1937 British film by John Baxter

- Directed by: John Baxter
- Written by: Stuart Jackson
- Produced by: John Barter
- Cinematography: Jack Parker
- Music by: Kennedy Russell
- Production company: U.K. Films
- Distributed by: Metro-Goldwyn-Mayer
- Release date: 1937
- Running time: 50 minutes
- Country: United Kingdom
- Language: English

The Academy Decides is a 1937 British drama film directed by John Baxter and starring April Vivian, Henry Oscar, John Oxford and Wensley Russell. It was written by Stuart Jackson, and made at Shepperton Studios as a quota quickie.

== Preservation status ==
The British Film Institute National Archive holds no stills or ephemera, and no film or video materials.

== Plot ==
The members of so-called "academy" of pavement artists, who also run a clandestine warning network for the criminal underworld, are the devoted guardians of the young daughter of one of them, whom they have brought up since she was a child. Tragedy strikes when the girl is lured away by man. After a year of searching, her guardians finally locate her, but she soon dies. The Academy decide to track down the culprit.

== Cast ==
- Henry Oscar as Dyke
- April Vivian as Mary
- John Oxford
- Wensley Russell
- Boris Ranevsky
- Frank Birch
- Walter Tobias

== Reception ==
The Monthly Film Bulletin wrote: "The film has a number of character parts and some vocal turns; it is unevenly acted and crudely directed though not without a distinct sense of melodrama."

Kine Weekly wrote: "Sentimental drama. Though taking less than an hour to show, the cumbersome style of production, the clumsy attempt at humour, and the mock heroics of most of the characters tend to make the time hang heavy on our hands. ... The film is full of what might have been small character studies; but the unreality of the story defeats the efforts of the actors, so that even Henry Oscar, in the leading role of Dyke, fails to make any convincing impression."

The Daily Film Renter wrote: "Leisurely in development, and over-theatrical, action never manages to convince, sole entertainment deriving from well-chosen types. Moderate quota support for uncritical."
