= Here Comes the Sun (film) =

- Theatrical release poster
- Directed by: John Baxter
- Written by: Geoffrey Orme
- Produced by: Baynham Honri; John Baxter
- Starring: Bud Flanagan; Chesney Allen; Elsa Tee
- Cinematography: Stanley Pavey
- Edited by: Vi Burdon
- Music by: Kennedy Russell
- Production company: John Baxter Productions
- Distributed by: General Film Distributors
- Release date: 10 June 1946
- Running time: 91 minutes
- Country: United Kingdom
- Language: English

Here Comes the Sun is a 1946 British comedy film directed by John Baxter and starring Bud Flanagan, Chesney Allen and Elsa Tee. It was written by Geoffrey Orme. The film's sets were designed by the art director Duncan Sutherland. A sports reporter on the run from the police tries to clear his name.

== Plot ==
On the death of his partner, newspaper publisher Bradshaw produces a bogus will which disinherits everybody but himself. To avoid detection, Bradshaw frames reporter Corona Flanagan, who is jailed. He escapes, and locates the genuine will which exposes Bradshaw's villainy.

== Cast ==
- Bud Flanagan as Corona Flanagan
- Chesney Allen as Ches Allen
- Elsa Tee as Helen Blare
- Joss Ambler as Bradshaw
- Dick Francis as governor
- John Dodsworth as Roy Lucas
- Gus McNaughton as Barrett
- Roddy Hughes as Simpson
- Horace Kenney as gatekeeper
- Edie Martin as Mrs. Galloway
- Peter Bernard as the barker
- Harry Terry as Bill
- A. A. Harris as the judge
- Ernest Sefton as usher
- Walter Roy as the lawyer
- Freddie Watts as Spike
- Victor Hagen as Joe
- Jack Buckland as Dudley
- Ian McLean as counsel for the prosecution
- Peter Artemus (of The Artemus Boys) as boy soprano/soloist

== Reception ==
The Monthly Film Bulletin wrote: "No attempt at realism is made in this story, which is really a frolic for Flanagan through a series of music-hall sketches in a law court, impersonating a Russian countess, boosting newspaper sales, holding concerts in gaol, performing the Indian rope trick. Not for sophisticated audiences, but amusing enough in an irresponsible fashion. There are songs, too, in the lightly sentimental Flanagan and Allen style and some of them are appealingly sung by a boy soloist 'Peter'."

Kine Weekly wrote: "Bud Flanagan is the life and soul of the play as Corona. He adopts many disguises, appears in female raiment and gently croons the soothing and tuneful jingles. Chesney Allen is squally good, if less prominent as Chesney, and Joss Ambler is sound as villain Bradshaw. Elsa Tee, John Dodsworth and Peter, a clever boy singer, head a sound supporting cast."

Picturegoer wrote: "There are plenty of tuneful hit songs and the fooling, especially in a prison burlesque sequence, is bright and well timed, Bud Flanagan carries most of the picture on his own shoulders, but his support is quite sound."

Picture Show wrote: "Flanagan and Allen are decidedly handicapped by the poor quality of their material in this comedy, despite their hard work and resource."
