= Dreaming (1944 British film) =

1944 British comedy film by John Baxter

- Original British quad poster by Clifford Rowe
- Directed by: John Baxter
- Screenplay by: Bud Flanagan; Reginald Purdell
- Produced by: Baynham Honri; John Baxter
- Starring: Bud Flanagan; Chesney Allen; Hazel Court
- Cinematography: Stanley Pavey
- Edited by: Inman Hunter
- Music by: Kennedy Russell
- Production company: John Baxter Productions
- Distributed by: Associated British Film Distributors (UK)
- Release dates: 28 November 1944 (London, England)
- Running time: 78 minutes
- Country: England
- Language: English

Dreaming is a 1944 British comedy film directed by John Baxter and starring Bud Flanagan, Chesney Allen and Hazel Court. It was written by Flanagan and Reginald Purdell. Its plot concerns a soldier who is knocked unconscious during a train journey and has a series of bizarre dreams. The film's sets were designed by Duncan Sutherland.

In 1944, Decca Records released a recording of Flanagan and Allen singing "Dreaming", the title song from the film.

== Plot ==
When British soldier Bud is hit on the head, the concussion causes a series of dreams whilst on the hospital operating table. In these he is fleeing hostile tribes in Africa, is a jockey winning a race at Ascot, turns up in Nazi Germany and is opening a wartime services canteen.

== Cast ==
- Bud Flanagan as Bud
- Chesney Allen as Ches
- Hazel Court as Miss Grey / Wren / Avalah
- Dick Francis as Sir Charles Paddock
- Philip Wade as Dr. Goebbels
- Gerry Wilmot as American General
- Peter Bernard as American soldier
- Ian McLean as British General
- Roy Russell as trainer
- Robert Adams as translator

== Reception ==
The Monthly Film Bulletin wrote: "Now and again this is reasonably good crazy comedy; but, on the whole, it is a film for Flanagan and Allen fans who will applaud uncritically and laugh at Flanagan's jokes almost before he makes them, even though they are not very funny and sometimes puerilely vulgar. Guest stars include Teddy Brown, Reginald Foort and Alfredo Campoli in a film which is efficiently produced and directed, but which might have been made much funnier."

The Daily Film Renter wrote: "The entire production has an air of humorous inconsequence: a series of sketches doing duty for a straight story. It should gain favour by virtue of its familiarity."

Picturegoer wrote: "It is all good humoured fooling in typical Flannagan and Allan style, which does not perhaps come over so well on the screen as it does on the stage. But however you look at it, it is one of the better of this irrepressible pair's screen efforts. Variety artistes and turns who appear in support do well, but the onus lies all the time on the stars to provide the bulk of the entertainment."
