= G. H. Mair =

British journalist and civil servant

George Herbert Mair CMG (8 May 1887 – 2 January 1926) was a British journalist and civil servant.

Mair was the son of a Royal Navy surgeon. He was educated at Aberdeen Grammar School, the University of Aberdeen, Christ Church, Oxford, and the Sorbonne. In 1909 he got a job as leader writer, drama critic and special correspondent on the Manchester Guardian, and was appointed political correspondent and literary editor in London in 1911. He became assistant editor of the Daily Chronicle in 1914.

In 1914 he was adopted as Prospective Parliamentary Candidate by Glasgow Central Liberal Party to contest the Unionist seat at the general election anticipated for 1914/15.

On the outbreak of the First World War, Mair attempted to join the armed forces, but was decreed medically unfit and instead joined the Foreign Office, becoming head of the Department of Information. When the Ministry of Information was formed in 1918, he became Assistant Secretary. He attended the Versailles Conference as Director of the Press Section of the British Delegation, and for this work he was appointed Companion of the Order of St Michael and St George (CMG) in the 1920 New Year Honours.

He was appointed assistant director of the League of Nations Secretariat in Geneva, and then returned to London as head of the League of Nations office in that city. He later returned to journalism as drama critic for the Evening Standard.

Mair married the Irish actress Maire O'Neill (1885–1952) in 1911. He died in 1926 at the age of 39.
