= Maire O'Neill =

Irish actress (1886–1952)

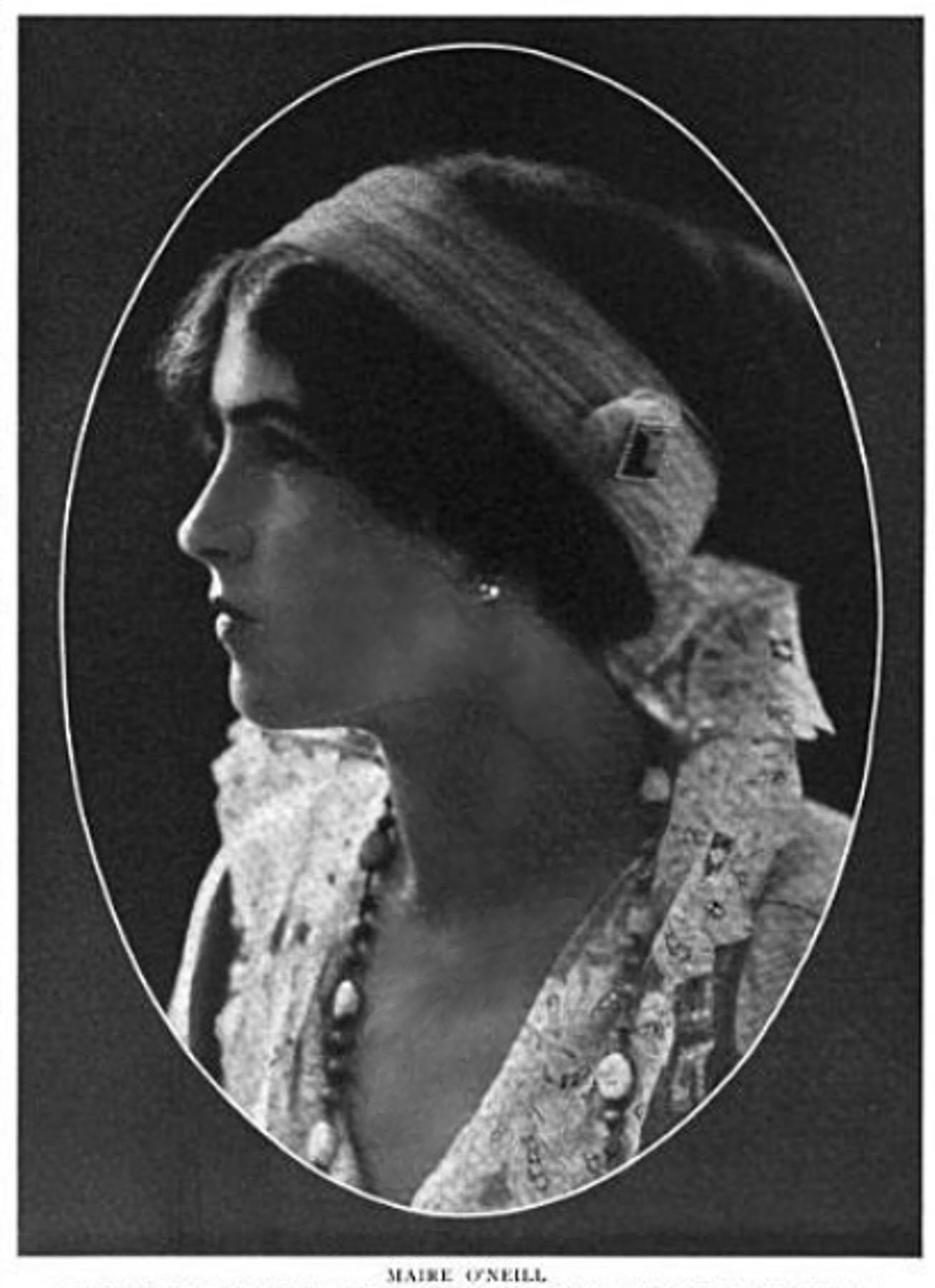
- O'Neill in 1913
- Born: Mary Agnes Allgood; 11 January 1886; Dublin, Ireland
- Died: 2 November 1952 (aged 66); Basingstoke, Hampshire, England
- Other name: Molly Allgood
- Occupation: Actress
- Years active: 1905–1952
- Spouses: G. H. Mair (m. 1911–1926) Arthur Sinclair (m. 1938–1951)

Maire O'Neill (born Mary Agnes Allgood; 11 January 1886 – 2 November 1952) was an Irish actress of stage and film. She holds a place in theatre history as the first actress to interpret the lead character of Pegeen Mike Flaherty in John Millington Synge's controversial masterpiece The Playboy of the Western World (1907).

== Life ==
Born at 40 Middle Abbey Street, Dublin, O'Neill was one of eight children of compositor George and French polisher Margaret (née Harold) Allgood, she was known as "Molly". Her father was sternly Protestant and against all music, dancing and entertainment, and her mother a strict Catholic. After her father died in 1896, she was placed in an orphanage. She was apprenticed to a dressmaker. One of Allgood's brothers, Tom, became a Catholic priest.

Maud Gonne set up Inghinidhe na hÉireann (Daughters of Ireland) in 1900 to educate women about Irish history, language and the arts, and Allgood and her elder sister Sara joined the association's drama classes around 1903. Their acting teacher, Willie Fay, enrolled them in the National Theatre Society, later known as the Abbey Theatre. Maire was part of the Abbey Theatre from 1906 to 1918 where she appeared in many productions. In 1904, she was cast in a play by Irish playwright Teresa Deevy titled Katie Roche, where she played the part of Margaret Drybone; there were 38 performances in this production.

In 1905, Molly met Irish playwright John Millington Synge, and they fell in love, a relationship regarded as scandalous because it crossed the class barriers of the time. In September 1907, he had surgery for the removal of troublesome neck glands, but a later tumour was found to be inoperable. They became engaged before his death in March 1909. Synge wrote the plays The Playboy of the Western World and Deirdre of the Sorrows for Allgood.

She made her American debut in New York in 1914 in the play General John Regan at the Hudson Theatre. Under her professional name Maire O'Neill, she appeared in films from 1930 to 1953, including Alfred Hitchcock's film version of Seán O'Casey's play Juno and the Paycock (1930), in which her sister (Sara Allgood) also appeared.

O'Neill played a small part in Brian Desmond Hurst’s film of Riders to the Sea (1935), which starred her sister Sara. Denis Johnston, who was also in the cast, relates in his biography of Synge a colourful incident during filming that involved Molly: she cunningly and simply managed to spoil the last shot of the week with a wardrobe malfunction so that the actors would get another week's filming - and pay - the next week.

== Marriages ==
In June 1911, she married G. H. Mair, drama critic of the Manchester Guardian, and later assistant secretary of the British Department of Information, assistant director of the League of Nations Information Office in Geneva, and head of the League of Nations office in London, with whom she had two children. He died suddenly on 3 January 1926. Six months later, she married Arthur Sinclair, an Abbey actor. They had two children but divorced.

Her life suffered a full share of tragedies: her fiancé Synge died before they married; she was crushed by her brother Frank's death in World War I in 1915; Arthur Sinclair died after 15 years of marriage; and their son died in an air crash in 1942. Her sister Sara's husband and baby died of influenza during the Spanish flu. Sara Allgood died two years before O'Neill; they had reportedly become estranged.

== Death ==
She died in Park Prewett Hospital, Basingstoke, England on 2 November 1952, aged 66, where she was receiving treatment after being badly burned in a fire at her London home.

== In fiction ==
Joseph O'Connor's 2010 novel Ghost Light loosely is based on Allgood's relationship with Synge.

== Partial filmography ==
- Juno and the Paycock (1930) - Mrs. Maisie Madigan
- M'Blimey (1931)
- Something Always Happens (1934) - Tenement Mother (uncredited)
- Sing As We Go (1934) - Madame Osiris
- Irish Hearts (1934) - Mrs. Moriarty
- Peg of Old Drury (1935) - Mrs. Woffington - Peg's Mother
- Come Out of the Pantry (1935) - Mrs. Gore
- Riders to the Sea (1935, Short) - First Woman
- Fame (1936) - Mrs. Docker
- Ourselves Alone (1936) - Nanny
- Bulldog Drummond at Bay (1937) - Norah, the Housekeeper
- Glamorous Night (1937) - Phoebe
- Spring Handicap (1937) - Meg Clayton
- Farewell Again (1937) - Mrs. Brough
- Oh Boy! (1938) - Mrs. Baggs
- Penny Paradise (1938) - Widow Clegg
- St Martin's Lane (1938) - Mrs. Such
- My Irish Molly (1938) - Mrs. O'Shea
- Mountains O'Mourne (1938) - Maura Macree
- Sword of Honour (1939) - Biddy
- The Missing People (1939) - Housekeeper
- On the Night of the Fire (1939) - Neighbour
- The Arsenal Stadium Mystery (1939) - Housekeeper
- Dr. O'Dowd (1940) - Mrs. Mulvanry
- Convoy (1940) - Mary Hogan (uncredited)
- You Will Remember (1941) - Mrs. Barrett
- Love on the Dole (1941) - Mrs. Dorbell
- Penn of Pennsylvania (1942) - Cook
- Let the People Sing (1942) - Mrs. Mitterley
- Those Kids from Town (1942) - Housekeeper
- Theatre Royal (1943) - Mrs. Cope
- Great Day (1945) - Mrs. Bridget Walsh
- Murder in Reverse (1945) - Mrs. Moore
- Gaiety George (1946) - Mrs. Murphy
- Piccadilly Incident (1946) - Mrs. Milligan
- Spring Song (1946) - Dresser
- Send for Paul Temple (1946) - Mrs. Neddy
- The Hills of Donegal (1947) - Hannah
- Saints and Sinners (1949) - Ma Murnaghan
- Someone at the Door (1950, uncredited)
- The Clouded Yellow (1950) - Nora
- Stranger at My Door (1950) - Clarissa Finnegan
- Scrooge (1951) - Alice's Patient
- Judgment Deferred (1952) - Mrs. O'Halloran
- Treasure Hunt (1952) - Bridgid
- The Oracle (1953) - Mrs. Lenham

== Playography ==
- Katie Roche (1994)
