= A Real Bloke =

1935 film by John Baxter

- Directed by: John Baxter
- Written by: Herbert Ayres
- Produced by: John Barter
- Starring: George Carney; Mary Clare; Diana Beaumont
- Cinematography: Desmond Dickinson
- Production companies: Baxter and Barter Productions
- Distributed by: Metro-Goldwyn-Mayer
- Release date: 26 August 1935
- Running time: 70 minutes
- Country: United Kingdom
- Language: English

A Real Bloke (also known as The Navvy) is a 1935 British drama film directed by John Baxter and starring George Carney, Mary Clare and Diana Beaumont. It was made at Cricklewood Studios as a quota quickie for release by MGM.

== Preservation status ==
The British Film Institute National Archive holds a collection of ephemera and stills but no film or video materials.

== Plot ==
Bill, a manual laborer, is laid off from his job but keeps this a secret to avoid spoiling his daughter Mary’s wedding. When he finally breaks the news to his wife, Kate, he finds she already knew. After a long period of unemployment, he eventually lands a demolition job; there, he heroically saves the foreman from being crushed by falling debris, an act that earns him his old position back with his old mates.

== Cast ==
- George Carney as Bill
- Mary Clare as Kate
- Diana Beaumont as Mary
- Peggy Novak as Lil
- Mark Daly as Scotty
- Billy Holland as Joe
- Wilson Coleman as watchman
- Roddy Hughes as Taffy
- Edgar Driver as Titch
- C. Denier Warren as tailor

== Reception ==
Kine Weekly wrote: "Simple drama of working class life, unpretentuons in presentation but strong in human interest. Although the story is obvious, its characters are real, and it lightly stirs the emotions, reaches quiet dramatic heights, and rises many a sympathetic laugh. ... George Carney and Mary Clare portray the Darby and Joan roles convincingly, but most of the entertainment lies in the accuracy with which the supporting players, Mark Daly, Edgar Driver, Dick Francis, Roddy Hughes and John Turnbull, etch character. The producer, John Baxter, has handled this simple study of working-class life with shrewd understanding. He is complete master of his subject and approaches it from the human angle without employing tubthumping tactics."

The Daily Film Renter wrote: "Film realistically mirrors daily round of humble workers, stressing camaraderie that exists between sons of toil when things go wrong. Staged in appropriate settings and spiced with touches of homely humour. Quota support for masses, with special appeal to industrial areas. ... Directed on straightforward lines, the picture is appropriately staged, there being no lack of simple humour."

Picturegoer wrote: "We do not get nearly enough stories dealing with the life of the British working classes; So one is glad to welcome this effort on that plea alone. It is not, however, as good as it! might have been, owing to the very obvious and slight nature of the story. On the other hand, the character drawing is sound and the sentiment is at least sincere. Indeed, like most of the pictures directed by John Baxter, it bears the hall-mark of sincerity."
