= The Shipbuilders =

1943 film directed by John Baxter

- Directed by: John Baxter
- Written by: George Blake (novel); Stephen Potter; Reginald Pound; Gordon Wellesley
- Produced by: John Baxter
- Starring: Clive Brook; Morland Graham; Finlay Currie
- Cinematography: James Wilson
- Edited by: Vi Burdon
- Music by: Kennedy Russell
- Production company: British National Films
- Distributed by: Anglo-American Film Corporation (UK)
- Release dates: 14 December 1943 (London, England)
- Running time: 90 minutes
- Country: United Kingdom
- Language: English

The Shipbuilders is a 1943 British drama film directed by John Baxter and starring Clive Brook, Morland Graham and Nell Ballantyne. It was written by Stephen Potter, Reginald Pound and Gordon Wellesley based on the 1935 novel of the same title by George Blake. The film is set in a Clyde shipyard in the build-up to the Second World War.

== Plot ==
in 1931 Clydeside shipbuilders John Pagan and Son launch the merchant ship Milano. Subsequently, with no further orders, the yard is forced to close. One of the men Managing Director Leslie Pagan manages to keep on, but who later resigns, is riveter Danny Shields, who had also been Pagan's batman in the First War. Danny's son Peter runs with a bad crowd and is facing a murder charge. With Pagan's help Peter is acquitted and goes to sea. As World War Two looms Pagan manages to re-open the shipyard. His young son John runs away to work on the Milano, where Peter is also a seaman. When the ship is attacked Peter sacrifices his life to save the ship, and John.

== Cast ==
- Clive Brook as Leslie Pagan
- Morland Graham as Danny Shields
- Nell Ballantyne as Mrs. Shields
- Finlay Currie as McWain (credited as Finaly Currie)
- Maudie Edwards as Lizzie
- Geoffrey Hibbert as Peter Shields
- Allan Jeayes as Ralph
- Moira Lister as Rita (credited as Moire Lister)
- Frederick Leister as Mr. Villier
- Gus McNaughton as Jim
- John Turnbull as Baird
- Ian Sadler
- Bertram Wallis as Caven Watson
- James Woodburn
- Beckett Bould
- Patric Curwen
- Michael Gainsborough
- Emrys Jones
- David Keir
- Ian McLean
- Dudley Paul
- Walter Roy
- David Trickett
- C. Denier Warren
- Alec Faversham

== Production ==
Preparation for production started in January 1943. It was made by British National Films and shot at Elstree Studios.

== Critical reception ==
The Monthly Film Bulletin wrote: "This is a sincere adaptation of the novel by George Blake, though it goes further than the book by bringing the story up to 1944. The continuity is at times jerky, but newsreel and studio shots have been combined to good effect, and the director, John Baxter, repeats with success the formula used in his earlier films of bringing social problems to the public mind through an entertainment film. The settings are excellent and the acting first class. Clive Brook is good as the shipyard owner, Leslie Pagan, but the honours of acting go to Morland Graham, whose characterisation of Danny leaves nothing to be desired."

Kine Weekly wrote: "Finely wrought, authentically staged and courageously impartial political melodrama giving an illuminating and stimulating story of the fluctuating fortunes of the vast Clydeside shipping industry from 1931 to the present day. The treatment, salutary and showmanlike, composite of fact and fiction, approaches its significant theme from a shrewd yet friendly master-and-man angle, and its willingness to recognise both points of view not only tempers powerful propaganda with good drama, but justifies a spectacular and optimistic culmination. ... A thoughtful stimulating and arresting British film for all classes and ages."

Variety wrote: "Granted it has a wealth of detail that's authentic and as effectively presented as a March of Time opus, Shipbuilders lacks entertainment."

TV Guide gave the film two out of four stars, calling it a "Well-made story."
