= Hearts of Humanity (1936 film) =

- Trade show advertisement, The Daily Film Renter (3 November 1936)
- Directed by: John Baxter
- Written by: Herbert Ayres; Gerald Elliott; Jack Francis; Geoffrey Orme
- Produced by: John Baxter
- Starring: Bransby Williams; Wilfred Walter; Cathleen Nesbitt; Eric Portman
- Cinematography: Jack Parker
- Edited by: Sidney Stone
- Music by: Kennedy Russell
- Production company: United Kingdom Films
- Distributed by: APD
- Release date: November 1936
- Running time: 75 minutes
- Country: United Kingdom
- Language: English

Hearts of Humanity (also known as Abide with Me, The Crypt and Gossip) is a 1936 British drama film directed by John Baxter and starring Bransby Williams, Wilfred Walter and Cathleen Nesbitt. It was written by Herbert Ayres, Gerald Elliott, Jack Francis and Geoffrey Orme. Like many of Baxter's films of the era, it is set amongst the underprivileged.

== Plot ==
Following a whispering campaign against him, a Church of England vicar leaves his parish and goes to London. Struck by remorse, one of his accusers gets his son to try to find him and make amends. Although from a wealthy background, the young man spends time amongst the down-and-outs of the city, until he finds the heavily-disguised priest leading the poor in resistance against exploitation by a socially well-connected criminal gang.

== Partial cast ==
- Bransby Williams as Mike Timmins
- Wilfred Walter as Reverend John Maitland
- Cathleen Nesbitt as Mrs. Bamford
- Pamela Randall as Ann Bamford
- Eric Portman as Jack Clinton
- Hay Petrie as Alf Hooper
- J. Fisher White as dad
- Fred Duprez as manager

== Production ==
The film was made at Shepperton Studios, with art direction by John Bryan.

== Reception ==
The Monthly Film Bulletin wrote: "The story is a moving one. The existence of the down-and-outs is sympathetically portrayed and the camera has been put to good use. The humour of the outcasts has been caught in the dialogue and in many of the situations. One minor blemish on the film is that the poor are represented as somewhat pious – they listen to wireless sermons and church music, while the wealthy dance to hot jazz in a big hotel. The acting is excellent and it is difficult to particularise. But D. Hay Petrie as a pickpocket is particularly worth watching."

The Daily Film Renter wrote: "Rambling story of young man's search in London's underworld for parson hounded out of parish by malicious gossip. Complicated development not always easy to follow, but entertaining angles are forthcoming from Stanelli's violin virtuosity, Romilly Choir, and Teddy Joyce's Band. Convincing crypt, doss-house and music hall locations are featured, while cast has numerous well-chosen types."

Picturegoer wrote: "Slight story with strong human and emotional aspects, which suffers from being over-prolonged. It has a tendency at times to become nothing much more than a conducted tour of London's underworld, but the backgrounds and the people one encounters are generally interesting."

Picture Show wrote: "Finely characterised and directed drama ... It is most convincingly set, and the dialogue natural."
