= Theatre Royal (film) =

- Directed by: John Baxter
- Written by: Bud Flanagan; Austin Melford; Geoffrey Orme
- Produced by: John Baxter
- Starring: Bud Flanagan; Chesney Allen; Lydia Sherwood
- Cinematography: James Wilson
- Edited by: Jack Harris
- Music by: Kennedy Russell
- Production company: British National Films
- Distributed by: Anglo-American Film Corporation
- Release date: 26 July 1943
- Running time: 101 minutes
- Country: United Kingdom
- Language: English

Theatre Royal is a 1943 British comedy film directed by John Baxter and starring Bud Flanagan, Chesney Allen and Lydia Sherwood. It was written by Flanagan, Austin Melford and Geoffrey Orme. The plot concerns an attempt by the staff of a theatre to prevent its closure.

== Plot ==
A London theatre is threatened with closure, but its staff fight to raise funds and secure the support of an important backer. The owners Parker and Maxwell try to prevent Harding from buying it but must find money.

They find a rich old American, Clement J. Earle, and try to get money out of him, but also trick him buying antique furniture in an old country house.

As Flanagan and Allen sleep together in a huge ornate bed the ghosts of the old house appear. Flanagan dreams they are Sir Francis Drake and Walter Raleigh meeting Queen Elizabeth I.

They audition the background helpers in the theatre to create a show including George the handyman. During the auditions they hear a wonderful female voice offstage and bring her on. She is the wonderful Welsh soprano Gwen Catley.

Flanagan and Allen put on blackface and sing on stage as a toff nd his chauffeur. They sing "I'll Always Have Time for You". From the stage they spot Harding in the audience.

Parker and George meet Harding's representative in a bar. They spot the man drugging the drinks so they swap them. Harding falls asleep. They steal his wallet for evidence.

The next protege on stage is nine-year-old Victor Feldman who drums excellently as the orchestra support him. He latterly became a proponent of modern jazz drumming in the UK and US, appearing with Ronnie Scott and Miles Davis, amongst others.

Mr Earle comes back and together with an English backer, Mr Bowman, they back a new show "Shake Partner". The show starts with the soprano coming out of a huge clam shell. She is joined by twenty ballerinas.

Flanagan and Allen put on top hat and tails and end the show.

== Cast ==
- Bud Flanagan as Bob Parker
- Chesney Allen as Gordon Maxwell
- Peggy Dexter as Connie Webster
- Lydia Sherwood as Claudia Brent
- Horace Kenney as George
- Marjorie Rhodes as Agnes
- Finlay Currie as Clement J. Earle
- Owen Reynolds as Harding
- Maire O'Neill as Mrs. Cope
- Gwen Catley as singer
- Victor Feldman and his Orchestra as themselves
- Buddy Flanagan as callboy
- Hal Gordon as gambler
- Ted Heath as himself
- David Hutcheson as Harry
- Jiver Hutchinson
- Jack Melford as himself
- Charles Mortimer as himself
- George Shearing as himself
- Ben Williams as himself

== Production ==
The film's sets were designed by C. Wilfred Arnold.

== Reception ==
The Monthly Film Bulletin wrote: "A slight, somewhat disconnected, and unoriginal plot serves merely as backcloth for a series of comedy sketches put over in typical Flanagan-and-Allen style, and for well staged song-and-dance numbers and a ballet sequence, The direction is slow in places, but the film is lavishly produced and the acting throughout is good. Flanagan and Allen – particularly the former – fit well into the roles of Parker and Maxwell, and a couple of ballads are very pleasingly sung by Gwen Catley. It is, in fact, a film which admirers of Flanagan and Allen will enjoy."

Kine Weekly wrote: "The story counts for little, but fortunately the entertainment is such that few will miss the absence of a deep-grained plot. Its unqualified success can be measured by its many good comedy skits, its co-stars, inimitable song numbers and the delightful singing of Gwen Catley. The laughter highlights are the scenes in which Gordon, Bob and the theatre staff attempt to impress Earle by furnishing Maxwell's empty town house for one night and posing as important guests; a dream sequence in which Gordon and Bob share a property bed, and the latter dreams he is Sir Francis Drake and Gordon is Sir Walter Raleigh, a sketch in which Bob pulls a fast one on the Income Tax authorities, and the clever audition interludes. The song scenes, featuring Gwen Catley, are effectively and gracefully interjected. The whole is typically British fun adroitly timed to entertain all sections."
