= I See Ice =

- Directed by: Anthony Kimmins
- Written by: Austin Melford; Anthony Kimmins
- Produced by: Basil Dean
- Starring: George Formby; Kay Walsh; Cyril Ritchard
- Cinematography: Gordon Dines; Ronald Neame
- Edited by: Ernest Aldridge
- Music by: Ernest Irving
- Production company: Associated Talking Pictures
- Distributed by: Associated British
- Release date: 10 February 1938
- Running time: 84 minutes
- Country: United Kingdom
- Language: English

I See Ice is a 1938 British comedy film directed by Anthony Kimmins and starring George Formby, Kay Walsh and Betty Stockfeld. It was written by Austin Melford and Kimmins.

The film depicts the adventures of a photographer working for a London newspaper. It features the songs "In My Little Snapshot Album", "Noughts And Crosses" and "Mother What'll I Do Now".

== Plot ==
The farcical adventures of a prop man with a touring ice ballet. Inventing a new sort of candid camera in his spare time, and concealing it in a bow-tie, our hero gets into a mess of trouble when he takes an incriminating photo of an important man; pulls a communication cord; winds up in jail; referees a hockey match; finds himself in a stage show dressed as a cossack; woos an attractive young ice skater; and eventually wins a job on a newspaper.

== Cast ==
- George Formby as George Bright
- Kay Walsh as Judy Gaye
- Cyril Ritchard as Paul Martine
- Betty Stockfeld as Mrs. Hunter
- Garry Marsh as Galloway
- Frederick Burtwell as detective
- Ernest Sefton as Outhwaite
- Gavin Gordon as night club singer
- Ernest Jay as theater manager
- Andreas Malandrinos as Lotus Club manager
- Gordon McLeod as Lord Felstead
- Archibald Batty as Colonel Hunter
- Elliott Mason as mother on train
- Roddy McDowall (age 9) child on train (uncredited)

== Box office ==
Kinematograph Weekly reported the film was a "winner" at the British box office in July 1938.

== Critical reception ==
The Monthly Film Bulletin wrote: "This riotous and crazy story is put over with immense gusto and good humour by George Formby whose unique personality and talents have never been better displayed on the screen. It is from first to last almost unadulterated slapstick in which, while everything seems to depend on the star, he is yet admirably and effectively backed up by a loyal and competent, supporting cast. The direction is resourceful and things are kept moving briskly."

Kine Weekly wrote: "George Formby's goofy humour has never been better exploited than in this picture. He runs the full gamut of slapstick, yet finds time to put over many nifty numbers to his own accompaniment on the ukulele."

Hal Erickson wrote in Allmovie that although the film is "well directed and exceptionally well cast (Kay Walsh and Cyril Ritchard appear in support), I See Ice wouldn't amount to a hill of beans without the presence of the ebullient Formby, who halts the action every once in a while for one of his unsubtly risque comic songs. Not surprisingly, the film was infinitely more popular as a "regional" than as a big-city attraction"/

Halliwell's Film Guide wrote, "fair star comedy with good production".

TV Guide wrote, "Wild little comedy with Formby performing uproariously as usual."
