= Patric Curwen =

British actor (1884–1949)

- Born: John Patric Curwen; 14 December 1884; London, England, United Kingdom
- Died: 31 May 1949 (aged 64); Rondebosch, Cape Town, South Africa
- Occupation: Actor

Patric Curwen (14 December 1884 – 31 May 1949) was a British stage and film actor.

== Biography ==
Curwen, son of John Spencer Curwen of the music publishing company, and grandson of John Curwen, founder of the Tonic sol-fa system, was educated at Abbotsholme School in Derbyshire, then New College, Oxford. He studied acting under Rosina Filippi and started his career at the Haymarket Theatre in London in 1907, appearing in productions of The Lyons Mail, Dr. Jekyll and Mr. Hyde and The Bells, among others.

During World War I he joined the Artists Rifles, then received a commission in the Royal Naval Volunteer Reserve. He served with the armoured car unit in France, but was moved to Naval Intelligence Division for health reasons, where he continued until 1920.

He spent four years in India learning tea and coffee planting, then returned to work in England with the Birmingham Repertory Theatre. From 1926 to 1928 he undertook an overseas tour, including visits to Australia and New Zealand, and on his return to England he continued to work as an actor in London in the years leading up to moving into film in 1931 and the start of his broadcasting career in 1934. He became well known as compère of the BBC programmes Scrapbook and Those Were The Days.

He died in 1949 at Rondebosch, Cape Town at the age of 64.

== Selected filmography ==
- The Ringer (1931)
- Loyalties (1933)
- Department Store (1935)
- Men of Yesterday (1936)
- There Was a Young Man (1937)
- Return to Yesterday (1940)
- The Man in Grey (1943)
- The Lamp Still Burns (1943)
- The Shipbuilders (1943)
- Strawberry Roan (1944)
- Don't Take It to Heart (1944)
- Give Me the Stars (1945)
- The Echo Murders (1945)
- They Knew Mr. Knight (1946)
- Nothing Venture (1948)
