= Doss House =

1933 British film by John Baxter

- Directed by: John Baxter
- Written by: Herbert Ayres
- Produced by: Ivar Campbell
- Starring: Frank Cellier; Arnold Bell; Herbert Franklyn
- Music by: Colin Wark
- Production companies: Baxter and Barter Productions
- Distributed by: Metro-Goldwyn-Mayer
- Release date: June 1933
- Running time: 53 minutes
- Country: United Kingdom
- Language: English

Doss House is a 1933 British drama film directed by John Baxter and starring Frank Cellier, Arnold Bell and Herbert Franklyn.

It was written by Herbert Ayres and made at Shepperton Studios as a quota quickie. In 1941 Baxter remade the film as The Common Touch.

== Cast ==
- Frank Cellier as editor
- Arnold Bell as reporter
- Herbert Franklyn asdetective
- Mark Daly as shoeblack
- Edgar Driver as catsmeat man
- Hubert Leslie as murderer
- Wilson Coleman as strangler
- Robert MacLachlan as doctor

== Reception ==
Kine Weekly wrote: "An artless British picture which finds the material for its drama in the stories of the lives of some of London's down-and-outs, habitués of a doss-house. The idea is an excellent one and be treatment displays imagination, but full exploitation of the theme has evidently been limited by the economy of presentation."

Picturegoer wrote: "I am not going to say that Doss House is a great film; it is not. But it has got a very good idea which it exploits quite well and intelligently. ... The atmosphere is exceedingly good, and though the picture contains no stellar names it is on the whole well acted."

In British Sound Films: The Studio Years 1928–1959 David Quinlan rated the film as "good", writing: "atmosphere is appropriately seedy and downbeat."

== Bibliography ==
- Chibnall, Steve. Quota Quickies: The Birth of the British 'B' Film. British Film Institute, 2007.
- Low, Rachael. Filmmaking in 1930s Britain. George Allen & Unwin, 1985.
- Wood, Linda. British Films, 1927-1939. British Film Institute, 1986.
