= Love on the Dole (film) =

1941 film by John Baxter

- DVD cover
- Directed by: John Baxter
- Written by: Walter Greenwood (novel and adaptation); Ronald Gow (play); Barbara K. Emary; Rollo Gamble
- Produced by: John Baxter
- Starring: Deborah Kerr; Clifford Evans
- Cinematography: James Wilson
- Edited by: Michael C. Chorlton
- Music by: Richard Addinsell; Orchestrated, Roy Douglas; Direction, Muir Mathieson
- Production company: British National Films
- Distributed by: Anglo-American Film Corporation (UK); United Artists (USA)
- Release dates: 28 June 1941 (UK); 12 October 1945 (US)
- Running time: 94 minutes
- Country: United Kingdom
- Language: English

Love on the Dole is a 1941 British drama film directed by John Baxter and starring Deborah Kerr and Clifford Evans. It was adapted by Walter Greenwood, Barbara K. Emary and Rollo Gamble from the 1934 play by Ronald Gow based on Greenwood's 1933 novel of the same name. It was the first English-made feature film to show English police wielding batons against a crowd. It is the best known film by Baxter and one of the best known from British National Pictures.

== Plot ==
It is 1930, at the height of the Great Depression. The Hardcastle family live in Hankey Park, part of Salford. Mr Hardcastle is a coalminer; his son, Harry, is an apprentice at a local engineering firm and Sally, his daughter, works at a cotton mill.

Mr Hardcastle's mine is put on a three-day week.

Harry wins £22 on his winning thruppence treble bet. Bookmaker Sam Grundy pays up without any trouble. At his father's suggestion, he takes his girlfriend Helen to the seaside resort of Blackpool on a holiday.

Harry becomes unemployed when his apprenticeship ends. The family’s plight is made worse by reductions in means tested unemployment benefits (the dole), whilst Helen's unexpected pregnancy causes further tensions.

Sally is courted by factory worker and Labour Party activist Larry Meath but their marriage plans are put in doubt when Larry loses his job. Larry is fatally injured when he tries to restore calm in a clash with the police during an unemployment march. Sally reluctantly becomes Grundy's mistress to help keep her unemployed family.

== Cast ==
- Deborah Kerr as Sally Hardcastle
- Clifford Evans as Larry Meath
- George Carney as Mr. Hardcastle
- Mary Merrall as Mrs. Hardcastle
- Geoffrey Hibbert as Harry Hardcastle
- Joyce Howard as Helen Hawkins
- Frank Cellier as Sam Grundy
- Martin Walker as Ned Narkey
- Maire O'Neill as Mrs. Dorbell
- Iris Vandeleur as Mrs. Nattle
- Marie Ault as Mrs. Jike
- Marjorie Rhodes as Mrs. Bull
- Terry Conlin as Ted Munter (uncredited)
- Jordan Lawrence as Sam Hardie (uncredited)
- Muriel George as landlady (uncredited)
- Ben Williams as factory worker (uncredited)
- Kenneth Griffith as Harry's pal in billiard hall (uncredited)
- John Slater as agitator on demonstration (uncredited)

== Production ==
The film was based on a book that was turned into a popular play. Although the book was successful, a proposed film version was rejected by the British Board of Film Censors (BBFC) in 1936 as it was a "very sordid story in very sordid surroundings". However, in 1940 the BBFC approved a similar proposal, with the film finally released in June 1941.

Jessie Matthews auditioned to play the role of Sally. John Baxter said she was good but he wanted an unknown to play the role out of fear a star would unbalance the movie.

Filming finished by February 1941.

== Reception ==
In a contemporary review, The Monthly Film Bulletin wrote, "Here is a film that ranks with the best we have ever produced. The direction is excellent, the photography admirable, and the casting particularly good."

Variety wrote: "The camera's facility in pin-pointing the tenets of tragedy has been harnessed for excellent results in Love on the Dole. ... Direction, plus the tight scripting of Barbara Emary, Rollo Gamble and Greenwood, makes the tragic journey vital and real. Deborah Kerr is satisfactorily hard as Sally; Clifford Evans' Larry shows understanding of the role of the labor crusader out for a better deal in life. ... North Country town and its poverty are authentically caught in atmosphere and sets. Photography of Jimmie Wilson is topline; equal plaudits go to Holmes Paul's department for special effects and art."

Deborah Kerr later said "It was an excellent book and an excellent play, and I think they made a very good movie from it. Strangely enough, it was much more appreciated in America than in Britain."
