= The Song of the Road =

1937 film directed by John Baxter

- Bransby Williams in the film
- Directed by: John Baxter
- Written by: Gerald Elliott; H. F. Maltby; Michael Kent
- Produced by: John Baxter
- Starring: Bransby Williams; Ernest Butcher; Muriel George; Davy Burnaby
- Cinematography: Jack Parker
- Edited by: Sidney Stone
- Music by: Kennedy Russell
- Production company: U.K. Films
- Distributed by: Sound City Films
- Release date: February 1937
- Running time: 71 minutes
- Country: United Kingdom
- Language: English

The Song of the Road is a 1937 British second feature ('B') drama film directed by John Baxter and starring Bransby Williams, Ernest Butcher and Muriel George. It was written by Gerald Elliott, H. F. Maltby and Michael Kent, and was made at Shepperton Studios. Like Baxter's earlier film The Song of the Plough (1933) the film examines the effect of modern technology on traditional working practices in the countryside.

== Synopsis ==
After the local council he works for decides to replace its horse-drawn services with motor vehicles, one of the drivers, Old Bill, spends his savings to buy the horse, Polly. Together they search the countryside looking for work, and meeting an assorted group of characters on the way.

== Cast ==
- Bransby Williams as Old Bill
- Ernest Butcher as farm foreman
- Muriel George as Mrs. Trelawney
- Davy Burnaby as Mr. Keppel
- Tod Slaughter as Dan Lorenzo
- John Turnbull as Bristow
- Edgar Driver as Titch
- Fred Schwartz as Solomon
- Percy Parsons as showman
- Peggy Novak as showman's wife
- H. F. Maltby as fair proprietor
- Ernest Jay as tinker
- Robert English as chairman
- F.B.J. Sharp as committee member
- Phil Thomas as George
- Madge Brindley as sideshow owner
- Vi Kaley as Mrs. Edwards, London landlady

== Reception ==
The Monthly Film Bulletin wrote: "Bransby Williams is full of dogged sentiment as Bill, but the theme seems out-of-date in a machine age long since accepted and the inveighing against mechanisation seems somewhat pointless. There are some lovely natural shots of Sussex, somewhat too obviously interpolated for their beauty rather than for their story value. There is also a good deal of simple humour, notaby from Ernest Butcher as the farm foreman and Davy Burnaby as the lovesick Keppel, whom Bill aids in his wooing of the widow Trelawney. Young people will probably find the film slow moving, but others will enjoy its quiet charm."

Kine Weekly wrote: "In this sentimental drama of the English countryside, the theme, man's love for his horse, is approached from an up-to-date but far from direct angle. In fact, the film is far more topographical than narratal. Still, the scenery is exquisitely picturesque, and many of the characters are both human and amusing, and, between the two, it nanages to promote pleasant, appealing documentary entertainment."

Picturegoer wrote: "Picturesque English scenery and good camera, but a very thin plot ... Bransby Williams is heavily sentimental in the leading role, but does manage to get over some good human touches. The supporting characters are quite sound. The treatment, however, is lacking in continuity and dramatic development."
