= Ben Williams (actor) =

British actor (1892–1959)

Ben Williams in The Spotlight (1939)

Benjamin Percy Williams (6 October 1892 in Glamorgan, Wales – December 1959 in Chelsea, London) was a British character actor from the 1930s to the late 1950s. During his career he appeared in 137 films. In 1954 Williams acted in the BBC Radio play Under Milk Wood that won the Prix Italia award for radio drama that year.

Originally a miner in Swansea, Williams served in the Royal Artillery in Palestine during the First World War, and he was an Air Raid Warden in London during the Second World War.

Williams made his film debut in an uncredited role in the 1933 film The Good Companions. Later appearances included roles in Tiger Bay (1934), Java Head (1934), Sexton Blake and the Bearded Doctor (1935), Boys Will Be Boys (1935), Flame in the Heather (1935), The Man Without a Face (1935), Sexton Blake and the Mademoiselle (1935), Gay Old Dog (1935), Blue Smoke (1935), and Find the Lady (1936.

Other film appearances include Sweeney Todd: The Demon Barber of Fleet Street (1936), The Crimes of Stephen Hawke (1936), The Return of the Scarlet Pimpernel (1937), The Gables Mystery (1938), The Saint in London (1939), The Stars Look Down (1940), The Proud Valley (1940), Let George Do It! (1940), Old Mother Riley's Circus (1941), Old Mother Riley's Ghosts (1941), Love on the Dole (1941), "Pimpernel" Smith (1941), Hi Gang! (1941), Uncensored (1942), Undercover (1943), Get Cracking (1943), The Saint Meets the Tiger (1943), Murder in Reverse (1945), Waterloo Road (1945), Give Me the Stars (1945), The Curse of the Wraydons (1946), Fame Is the Spur (1947), My Brother's Keeper (1948), Don't Ever Leave Me (1949), and Boys in Brown (1949).

During the 1950s his film and television work included Sunday Night Theatre (BBC) (1950), Dick Barton at Bay (1950), Mister Drake's Duck (1951), Lilli Marlene (1951), Women of Twilight (1952), Hindle Wakes (1952), Circumstantial Evidence (1952), Paul Temple Returns (1952), Face the Music (1954), Stryker of the Yard (TV series) (1957), Hell Drivers (1957), The One That Got Away (1957), and Armchair Theatre (1958). In 1954 he played Mr. Pritchard in an all-Welsh cast BBC Radio version of Under Milk Wood with Richard Burton.

During his later years he lived in Mitre House on King's Road, Chelsea. His hobbies were listed as 'most sports'.

Williams died in Chelsea in London aged 67. He was survived by a son, Philip Trigwell (born 1947) from a relationship with Etta Trigwell, and a daughter, Betty Hopkins (born 1917).

== Selected filmography ==
- Blue Smoke (1935)
- Gay Old Dog (1935)
- Flame in the Heather (1935)
- The Man Without a Face (1935)
- Apron Fools (1936)
- The Crimes of Stephen Hawke (1936)
- Find the Lady (1936)
- Old Mother Riley's Circus (1941)
- 'Pimpernel' Smith (1941)
- Hi Gang! (1941)
- We'll Smile Again (1942)
- Gert and Daisy's Weekend (1942)
- Front Line Kids (1942)
- Theatre Royal (1943)
- Dual Alibi (1947)
- Nothing Venture (1948)
- A Boy, a Girl and a Bike (1949)
- The Girl Is Mine (1950)
- Something in the City (1950)
- Prelude to Fame (1950)
- Files from Scotland Yard (1951)
- Night Was Our Friend (1951)
- Marilyn (1953)
- There Was a Young Lady (1953)
- You Pay Your Money (1957)
