= Edgar Driver =

British actor (1885–1964)

- Born: 1 November 1885; Clapton, London, England
- Died: 15 September 1964 (aged 78)
- Occupation: Actor
- Years active: 1933–1968

Edgar Driver (1 November 1885 – 15 September 1964) was a British actor.

== Selected filmography ==
- Song of the Plough (1933) as Barber
- Doss House (1933)
- Say It with Flowers (1934)
- Flood Tide (1934) as Titch
- The Admiral's Secret (1934)
- Kentucky Minstrels (1934)
- Designing Women (1934)
- Music Hall (1934)
- Jimmy Boy (1935)
- A Real Bloke (1935)
- The Small Man (1936)
- Men of Yesterday (1936)
- The Song of the Road (1937)
- Talking Feet (1937)
- Keep Fit (1937)
- Sunset in Vienna (1937)
- Stepping Toes (1938)
- Lily of Laguna (1938)
- Old Mother Riley's Circus (1941)
- Headline (1944)
- The Agitator (1945)
- The Grand Escapade (1946)
- Dark Secret (1949)
- Private's Progress (1956)
- Playback (1962)
