= John Baxter (director) =

British filmmaker (1896–1975)

John Philip Baxter
- Born: 31 December 1896; Kent, England
- Died: 21 January 1975 (aged 78); London, England
- Occupation: Film director

John Philip Baxter (31 December 1896 – 21 January 1975) was a British filmmaker active from the 1930s to the late-1950s. During that time, he produced, wrote, or directed several films. He directed Deborah Kerr in her first leading role in Love on the Dole (1941), and was the producer-director for the musical-comedy films of Flanagan and Allen during World War II. He was one of the leading directors for British National Pictures.

== Early life and career ==
Baxter was born on 31 December 1896 in Kent. He worked as a theatrical agent and theater manager. He became an assistant director in 1932. He formed his own production company with his friend John Barter. He also acted in several films produced by Lance Comfort.

Baxter played a major role in the foundation of National Film Finance Corporation in 1948. He also directed and produced Judgment Deferred (1952) which was the first film of Group 3, a British government backed production venture. His last film as a director was Ramsbottom Rides Again (1956) which featured Arthur Askey.

== Death ==
Baxter died in London in 1975.

== Filmography ==
Director
Year	Title	Notes
1933	Doss House	
1933	Song of the Plough	
1934	Flood Tide	
1934	Lest We Forget	
1934	Music Hall	Also writer
1934	Kentucky Minstrels	
1934	Say It with Flowers	Also writer
1935	Jimmy Boy	
1935	A Real Bloke	
1935	The Small Man	
1936	Men of Yesterday	
1936	Birds of a Feather	
1936	Hearts of Humanity	
1937	The Song of the Road	
1937	The Academy Decides	
1937	Talking Feet	
1938	Stepping Toes	
1939	Secret Journey	
1939	What Would You Do, Chums?	
1940	Old Mother Riley in Society	
1940	Laugh It Off	
1940	Love on the Dole	
1941	The Common Touch	
1941	Crook's Tour	
1941	Old Mother Riley's Ghosts	
1941	Old Mother Riley in Business	
1942	We'll Smile Again	
1942	Let the People Sing	Also writer
1942	The Shipbuilders	
1943	Theatre Royal	
1944	Dreaming	
1946	Here Comes the Sun	
1946	The Grand Escapade	
1947	Fortune Lane	
1948	Nothing Venture	
1948	When You Come Home	
1949	Three Bags Full	
1950	The Dragon of Pendragon Castle	
1950	The Second Mate	
1952	Judgment Deferred	
1953	The Last Load	
1956	Ramsbottom Rides Again	Also writer

=== Writer ===
- The Heart Within (1957)
