= List of Butcher's Film Service films =

This is a list of feature films produced or distributed by the British company Butcher's Film Service. The company began active production during the First World War. In the 1950s and 1960s, it was a producer of low-budget films, often second features.

== 1910s ==
Title	Release date	Director	Notes
A Welsh Singer	December 1915	Henry Edwards	
Face to Face	March 1916	Frank Wilson	
A Place in the Sun	June 1916	Laurence Trimble	
Grim Justice	August 1916	Laurence Trimble	
East Is East	August 1916	Henry Edwards	
The Grit of a Jew	May 1917	Maurice Elvey	
The Woman Who Was Nothing	June 1917	Maurice Elvey	
Merely Mrs. Stubbs	July 1917	Henry Edwards	
The Failure	August 1917	Henry Edwards	
Flames	September 1917	Maurice Elvey	
Broken Threads	December 1917	Henry Edwards	
Mary Girl	December 1917	Maurice Elvey	
Meg o' the Woods	February 1918	Bertram Phillips	
Goodbye	March 1918	Maurice Elvey	
Because	April 1918	Sidney Morgan	
What Would a Gentleman Do?	May 1918	Wilfred Noy	
Spinner o' Dreams	June 1918	Wilfred Noy	
Democracy	October 1918	Sidney Morgan	
After Many Days	January 1919	Sidney Morgan	
All Men Are Liars	January 1919	Sidney Morgan	
As He Was Born	January 1919	Wilfred Noy	
The Nature of the Beast	January 1919	Cecil M. Hepworth	
The Starting Point	June 1919	Edwin J. Collins	
The Kinsman	June 1919	Henry Edwards	
Sunken Rocks	August 1919	Cecil M. Hepworth	
Possession	September 1919	Henry Edwards	
Sheba	October 1919	Cecil M. Hepworth	
Nobody's Child	October 1919	George Edwardes-Hall	
The Forest on the Hill	November 1919	Cecil M. Hepworth	
Sweet and Twenty	November 1919	Sidney Morgan	

== 1920s ==
Title	Release date	Director	Notes
Desire	January 1920	George Edwardes-Hall	
Lady Noggs	January 1920	Sidney Morgan	
A Temporary Vagabond	January 1920	Henry Edwards	
Lorna Doone	February 1920	Horace Lisle Lucoque	
The Black Sheep	March 1920	Sidney Morgan	
The Scarlet Wooing	April 1920	Sidney Morgan	
Fate's Plaything	May 1920	Maurits Binger	
The Black Spider	May 1920	William J. Humphrey	
Little Dorrit	August 1920	Sidney Morgan	
The Sword of Damocles	August 1920	George Ridgwell	
Laddie	September 1920	Bannister Merwin	
The Woman of the Iron Bracelets	September 1920	Sidney Morgan	
Two Little Wooden Shoes	September 1920	Sidney Morgan	
The Law Divine	November 1920	Challis Sanderson	
By Berwin Banks	November 1920	Sidney Morgan	
The Children of Gibeon	November 1920	Sidney Morgan	
The Channings	November 1920	Edwin J. Collins	
A Man's Shadow	December 1920	Sidney Morgan	
Kissing Cup's Race	December 1920	Walter West	
Hard Cash	February 1921	Edwin J. Collins	
The Scallywag	March 1921	Challis Sanderson	
Stella	April 1921	Edwin J. Collins	
Daniel Deronda	May 1921	W. Courtney Rowden	
Corinthian Jack	June 1921	W. Courtney Rowden	
Miss Charity	August 1921	Edwin J. Collins	
Love at the Wheel	September 1921	Bannister Merwin	
The God in the Garden	October 1921	Edwin J. Collins	
The Marriage Lines	November 1921	Wilfred Noy	
The Mayor of Casterbridge	November 1921	Sidney Morgan	
A Lowland Cinderella	December 1921	Sidney Morgan	
When Greek Meets Greek	May 1922	Walter West	
The Lilac Sunbonnet	July 1922	Sidney Morgan	
A Sporting Double	July 1922	Arthur Rooke	
Son of Kissing Cup	August 1922	Walter West	
Fires of Innocence	September 1922	Sidney Morgan	
Pages of Life	November 1922	Adelqui Migliar	
Was She Justified?	November 1922	Walter West	
Weavers of Fortune	December 1922	Arthur Rooke	
Rogues of the Turf	January 1923	Walter West	
Hornet's Nest	March 1923	Walter West	
The Lady Owner	April 1923	Walter West	
Little Miss Nobody	June 1923	Wilfred Noy	
Beautiful Kitty	July 1923	Walter West	
The School for Scandal	September 1923	Bertram Phillips	
What Price Loving Cup?	October 1923	Walter West	
M'Lord of the White Road	November 1923	Arthur Rooke	
In the Blood	December 1923	Walter West	
The Great Turf Mystery	January 1924	Walter West	
The Wine of Life	May 1924	Arthur Rooke	
The Gay Corinthian	July 1924	Arthur Rooke	
The Stirrup Cup Sensation	September 1924	Walter West	
The Diamond Man	October 1924	Arthur Rooke	
Nets of Destiny	November 1924	Arthur Rooke	
Livingstone	January 1925	M.A. Wetherell	
The Little People	April 1926	George Pearson	
Wait and See	February 1928	Walter Forde	
The Hellcat	March 1928	Harry Hughes	
Virginia's Husband	May 1928	Harry Hughes	
What Next?	June 1928	Walter Forde	
Troublesome Wives	August `1928	Harry Hughes	
The Silent House	January 1929	Walter Forde	
Would You Believe It!	May 1929	Walter Forde	

== 1930s ==
Title	Release date	Director	Notes
Red Pearls	February 1930	Walter Forde	
You'd Be Surprised!	April 1930	Walter Forde	
The Last Hour	June 1930	Walter Forde	
Such Is the Law	November 1930	Sinclair Hill	
Kissing Cup's Race	November 1930	Castleton Knight	
Deadlock	September 1931	George King	
The Great Gay Road	December 1931	Sinclair Hill	
Watch Beverly	October 1932	Arthur Maude	
The House of Trent	December 1933	Norman Walker	
Love's Old Sweet Song	December 1933	Manning Haynes	
Boots! Boots!	July 1934	Bert Tracy	
Danny Boy	July 1934	Oswald Mitchell	
Song at Eventide	July 1934	Harry Hughes	
The Broken Rosary	1934	Harry Hughes	
Womanhood	1934	Harry Hughes	
Barnacle Bill	January 1935	Harry Hughes	
Variety	March 1935	Adrian Brunel	
City of Beautiful Nonsense	May 1935	Adrian Brunel	
Cock o' the North	July 1935	Oswald Mitchell	
Father O'Flynn	November 1935	Wilfred Noy	
Lieutenant Daring R.N.	1935	Reginald Denham	
King of Hearts	March 1936	Oswald Mitchell	
Melody of My Heart	April 1936	Wilfred Noy	
Annie Laurie	1936	Walter Tennyson	
Shipmates o' Mine	1936	Oswald Mitchell	
Stars on Parade	1936	Oswald Mitchell	
Well Done, Henry	1936	Wilfred Noy	
Variety Parade	1936	Oswald Mitchell	
Love Up the Pole	September 1936	Clifford Gulliver	
Rose of Tralee	April 1937	Oswald Mitchell	
Song of the Forge	May 1937	Henry Edwards	
Old Mother Riley	August 1937	Oswald Mitchell	
The Minstrel Boy	September 1937	Sidney Morgan	
The Schooner Gang	1937	W. Devenport Hackney	
Old Mother Riley in Paris	May 1938	Oswald Mitchell	
Almost a Gentleman	June 1938	Oswald Mitchell	
Anything to Declare?	December 1938	Redd Davis	
Many Tanks Mr. Atkins	December 1938	Roy William Neill	
Mountains O'Mourne	1938	Harry Hughes	
Little Dolly Daydream	1938	Oswald Mitchell	
Lily of Laguna	1938	Oswald Mitchell	
Night Journey	1938	Oswald Mitchell	
Sword of Honour	March 1939	Maurice Elvey	
Old Mother Riley, MP	August 1939	Oswald Mitchell	
Music Hall Parade	1939	Oswald Mitchell	

== 1940s ==
Title	Release date	Director	Notes
The Girl Who Forgot	February 1940	Adrian Brunel	
Pack Up Your Troubles	February 1940	Oswald Mitchell	
Jailbirds	February 1940	Oswald Mitchell	
Somewhere in England	August 1940	John E. Blakeley	
Three Silent Men	December 1940	Thomas Bentley	
Garrison Follies	October 1940	Maclean Rogers	
Sailors Don't Care	December 1940	Oswald Mitchell	
Cavalcade of Variety	December 1940	Thomas Bentley	
Danny Boy	August 1941	Oswald Mitchell	
Facing the Music	August 1941	Maclean Rogers	
Sheepdog of the Hills	December 1941	Germain Burger	
Gert and Daisy's Weekend	February 1942	Maclean Rogers	
Somewhere in Camp	February 1942	John E. Blakeley	
Bob's Your Uncle	March 1942	Oswald Mitchell	
Front Line Kids	June 1942	Maclean Rogers	
Gert and Daisy Clean Up	August 1942	Maclean Rogers	
Rose of Tralee	1942	Germain Burger	
Somewhere on Leave	February 1943	John E. Blakeley	
Variety Jubilee	June 1943	Maclean Rogers	
I'll Walk Beside You	August 1943	Maclean Rogers	
Somewhere in Civvies	November 1943	Maclean Rogers	
It's in the Bag	February 1944	Herbert Mason	
Demobbed	June 1944	John E. Blakeley	
Kiss the Bride Goodbye	January 1945	Paul L. Stein	
My Ain Folk	April 1945	Germain Burger	
For You Alone	May 1945	Geoffrey Faithfull	
Home Sweet Home	October 1945	John E. Blakeley	
Under New Management	May 1946	John E. Blakeley	
I'll Turn to You	June 1946	Geoffrey Faithfull	
Send for Paul Temple	December 1946	John Argyle	
When You Come Home	April 1947	John Baxter	
The Hangman Waits	June 1947	A. Barr-Smith	
The Hills of Donegal	September 1947	John Argyle	
Night Comes Too Soon	May 1948	Denis Kavanagh	
Calling Paul Temple	June 1948	Maclean Rogers	
The Story of Shirley Yorke	October 1948	Maclean Rogers	
The Monkey's Paw	November 1948	Norman Lee	
But Not in Vain	December 1948	Edmond T. Gréville	
Dark Secret	October 1949	Maclean Rogers	

== 1950s ==
Title	Release date	Director	Notes
Paul Temple's Triumph	May 1950	Maclean Rogers	
Once a Sinner	July 1950	Lewis Gilbert	
Something in the City	September 1950	Maclean Rogers	
Scarlet Thread	May 1951	Lewis Gilbert	
There Is Another Sun	June 1951	Lewis Gilbert	
Madame Louise	October 1951	Maclean Rogers	
Salute the Toff	January 1952	Maclean Rogers	
Emergency Call	May 1952	Lewis Gilbert	
Hammer the Toff	May 1952	Maclean Rogers	
Paul Temple Returns	November 1952	Maclean Rogers	
The Super Secret Service	1953	Charles W. Green	
There Was a Young Lady	January 1953	Lawrence Huntington	
The Broken Horseshoe	July 1953	Martyn C. Webster	
Marilyn	November 1953	Wolf Rilla	
Operation Diplomat	December 1953	John Guillermin	
The Black Rider	December 1954	Wolf Rilla	
Stock Car	1955	Wolf Rilla	
It's a Great Day	1955	John Warrington	
Cloak Without Dagger	February 1956	Joseph Sterling	
Assignment Redhead	October 1956	Maclean Rogers	
You Pay Your Money	February 1957	Maclean Rogers	
Man from Tangier	June 1957	Lance Comfort	
Undercover Girl	January 1958	Francis Searle	
Blind Spot	July 1958	Peter Maxwell	
The Golden Disc	August 1958	Don Sharp	
Mark of the Phoenix	November 1958	Maclean Rogers	
The Secret Man	December 1958	Ronald Kinnoch	
Them Nice Americans	1958	Anthony Young	
In the Wake of a Stranger	June 1959	David Eady	
The Crowning Touch	June 1959	David Eady	
Life in Danger	September 1959	Terry Bishop	
Cover Girl Killer	September 1959	Terry Bishop	
Naked Fury	1959	Charles Saunders	

== 1960s ==
Title	Release date	Director	Notes
Trouble with Eve	March 1960	Francis Searle	
The Man Who Couldn't Walk	October 1960	Henry Cass	
The Gentle Trap	October 1960	Charles Saunders	
The Hand	October 1960	Henry Cass	
Rag Doll	March 1961	Lance Comfort	
Pit of Darkness	October 1961	Lance Comfort	
The Breaking Point	1961	Lance Comfort	
Freedom to Die	1961	Francis Searle	
Emergency	March 1962	Francis Searle	
Gaolbreak	April 1962	Francis Searle	
Serena	June 1962	Peter Maxwell	
Danger by My Side	September 1962	Charles Saunders	
Night of the Prowler	December 1962	Francis Searle	
Impact	February 1963	Peter Maxwell	
Echo of Diana	May 1963	Ernest Morris	
Shadow of Fear	July 1963	Ernest Morris	
The Hi-Jackers	December 1963	Jim O'Connolly	
Frozen Alive	December 1964	Bernard Knowles	
The Sicilians	1964	Ernest Morris	
Smokescreen	1964	Jim O'Connolly	
Night Caller from Outer Space	December 1965	John Gilling	
Some May Live	April 1967	Vernon Sewell	
Walk a Crooked Path	October 1969	John Brason	
Night After Night After Night	1969	Lindsay Shonteff	

== See also ==
- List of Two Cities Films
- List of British and Dominions films
- List of Gainsborough Pictures films
- List of Ealing Studios films
- List of British Lion films
- List of British National films
- List of General Film Distributors films
- List of Stoll Pictures films

== Bibliography ==
- Steve Chibnall & Brian McFarlane The British 'B' Film. Bloomsbury Publishing, 2017.
