= List of British films of 1939 =

A list of British films released in 1939.

== 1939 ==
Title	Director	Cast	Genre	Notes
1939
All Living Things	Andrew Buchanan	Catherine Lacey, Michael Gainsborough	Drama short	
The Arsenal Stadium Mystery	Thorold Dickinson	Leslie Banks, Greta Gynt, Ian McLean	Mystery	
Ask a Policeman	Marcel Varnel	Will Hay, Graham Moffatt, Moore Marriott	Comedy	
Beyond Our Horizon	Norman Walker	Milton Rosmer, Josephine Wilson, Jimmy Hanley	Drama Short	
Black Eyes	Herbert Brenon	Otto Kruger, Mary Maguire, Walter Rilla	Drama	
Black Limelight	Paul L. Stein	Joan Marion, Raymond Massey, Henry Oscar	Crime	
Blind Folly	Reginald Denham	Clifford Mollison, Lilli Palmer, Leslie Perrins	Comedy	
The Body Vanished	Walter Tennyson	Anthony Hulme, C. Denier Warren, Ernest Sefton	Crime drama	
Cheer Boys Cheer	Walter Forde	Edmund Gwenn, Nova Pilbeam, Jimmy O'Dea	Comedy	
Come On George!	Anthony Kimmins	George Formby, Pat Kirkwood, Ronald Shiner	Comedy	
Confidential Lady	Arthur B. Woods	Stewart Rome, Jane Baxter, Ben Lyon	Drama	
The Dark Eyes of London	Walter Summers	Bela Lugosi, Greta Gynt, Hugh Williams	Horror	
Dead Men are Dangerous	Harold French	Robert Newton, John Warwick, Googie Withers	Thriller	
Discoveries	Redd Davis	Carroll Levis, Issy Bonn	Variety revue	
Down Our Alley	George A. Cooper	Hughie Green, Vivienne Chatterton, Wally Patch	Musical comedy	
The Face at the Window	George King	Tod Slaughter, Marjorie Taylor, John Warwick	Thriller	
Flying Fifty-Five	Reginald Denham	Derrick de Marney, Nancy Burne, Marius Goring	Drama	
The Four Feathers	Zoltan Korda	Ralph Richardson, John Clements, June Duprez	Adventure	
The Four Just Men	Walter Forde	Frank Lawton, Hugh Sinclair, Griffith Jones, Francis L. Sullivan	Thriller	
French Without Tears	Anthony Asquith	Ray Milland, Ellen Drew, Roland Culver	Comedy	
The Frozen Limits	Marcel Varnel	The Crazy Gang, Moore Marriott, Bernard Lee	Comedy	
The Gang's All Here	Thornton Freeland	Jack Buchanan, Googie Withers, Edward Everett Horton	Comedy	
A Gentleman's Gentleman	Roy William Neill	Eric Blore, Marie Lohr, Patricia Hilliard	Comedy	
A Girl Must Live	Carol Reed	Margaret Lockwood, Renée Houston, Lilli Palmer	Comedy	
The Good Old Days	Roy William Neill	Max Miller, Hal Walters, Kathleen Gibson	Comedy	
Goodbye, Mr. Chips	Sam Wood	Robert Donat, Greer Garson, Paul Henreid	Drama	Number 72 in the list of BFI Top 100 British films
Happy Event	Patrick Brunner	Diana Magwood, H. Seaton, Gordon Leslie	Drama short	
Hell's Cargo	Harold Huth	Walter Rilla, Kim Peacock, Robert Newton	Adventure	
Home from Home	Herbert Smith	Sandy Powell, René Ray, Kathleen Harrison	Comedy drama	
Hospital Hospitality	William Christie	Wally Patch, Finlay Currie, George Bass, Jr.	Comedy short	
I Killed the Count	Frederic Zelnik	Ben Lyon, Syd Walker, Antoinette Cellier	Comedy	
I Met a Murderer	Roy Kellino	James Mason, Pamela Mason, William Devlin	Thriller	
Inquest	Ray Boulting	Elizabeth Allen, Herbert Lomas, Hay Petrie	Crime	
Inspector Hornleigh on Holiday	Walter Forde	Gordon Harker, Alastair Sim, Linden Travers	Comedy crime	
Jamaica Inn	Alfred Hitchcock	Charles Laughton, Maureen O'Hara, Emlyn Williams	Drama	
Just like a Woman	Paul L. Stein	John Lodge, Gertrude Michael, Jeanne De Casalis	Comedy	
The Lambeth Walk	Albert de Courville	Lupino Lane, Sally Gray, Enid Stamp-Taylor	Comedy	
Let's Be Famous	Walter Forde	Jimmy O'Dea, Betty Driver, Sonnie Hale	Comedy	
The Lion Has Wings	Various	Merle Oberon, Ralph Richardson, June Duprez	War	
Lucky to Me	Thomas Bentley	Stanley Lupino, Phyllis Brooks, Barbara Blair	Comedy	
Me and My Pal	Thomas Bentley	Dave Willis, Patricia Kirkwood, John Warwick	Comedy	
Men Without Honour	Widgey R. Newman	Ian Fleming, Grace Arnold, Charles Paton	Crime	
The Mikado	Victor Schertzinger	Kenny Baker, Martyn Green, Sydney Granville	Musical comedy	
The Mind of Mr. Reeder	Jack Raymond	Will Fyffe, Kay Walsh	Mystery	
Murder in Soho	Norman Lee	Jack La Rue, Bernard Lee	Crime	
Murder Will Out	Roy William Neill	John Loder, Jane Baxter	Crime	
Music Hall Parade	Oswald Mitchell	Richard Norris, Charles Sewell	Musical	
The Mysterious Mr. Davis	Claude Autant-Lara	Henry Kendall, Kathleen Kelly	Drama	
The Nursemaid Who Disappeared	Arthur B. Woods	Arthur Margetson, Peter Coke	Crime	
Oh Dear Uncle	Richard Llewellyn	Frank O'Brien, Syd Crossley	Comedy short	
Old Mother Riley, MP	Oswald Mitchell	Arthur Lucan, Kitty McShane	Comedy	
On the Night of the Fire	Brian Desmond Hurst	Ralph Richardson, Diana Wynyard	Crime	
The Outsider	Paul L. Stein	George Sanders, Mary Maguire	Drama	
Over the Moon	Thornton Freeland	Rex Harrison, Ursula Jeans	Comedy	
Pandamonium	Widgey R. Newman	Hal Walters, Jane Griffiths	Comedy short	
Pathetone Parade of 1939	Fred Watts	Robb Wilton, Mantovani	Variety short	
Pathetone Parade of 1940	Fred Watts	Robb Wilton, Patrica Rossborough, Nosmo King	Variety short	
Poison Pen	Paul L. Stein	Flora Robson, Reginald Tate, Ann Todd	Drama	
Prince of Peace	Donald Carter	Pamela Kellino	Drama short	
Q Planes	Tim Whelan	Ralph Richardson, Laurence Olivier, Valerie Hobson	World War II	
Secret Journey	John Baxter	Basil Radford, Peter Gawthorne	Thriller	
Shadow of Death	Harry S. Marks	Donald Calthrop, Ellen Pollock	Drama short	
She Couldn't Say No	Graham Cutts	Tommy Trinder, Fred Emney	Comedy	
Shipyard Sally	Monty Banks	Gracie Fields, Sydney Howard	Comedy	
The Silent Battle	Herbert Mason	Rex Harrison, Valerie Hobson	Thriller	
So This Is London	Thornton Freeland	Robertson Hare, Alfred Drayton	Comedy	
Sons of the Sea	Maurice Elvey	Leslie Banks, Kay Walsh	Drama	
The Spy in Black	Michael Powell	Conrad Veidt, Valerie Hobson, Marius Goring	World War I	First collaboration between Powell and Pressburger
Stolen Life	Paul Czinner	Elisabeth Bergner, Michael Redgrave	Drama	
Sword of Honour	Maurice Elvey	Geoffrey Toone, Sally Gray	Drama	
There Ain't No Justice	Pen Tennyson	Jimmy Hanley, Edward Rigby	Drama	
This Man in Paris	David MacDonald,	Barry K. Barnes, Valerie Hobson, Alastair Sim	Comedy/mystery	Sequel to This Man Is News
Too Dangerous to Live	Anthony Hankey, Leslie Norman	Sebastian Shaw, Anna Konstam	Crime	
Traitor Spy	Walter Summers	Bruce Cabot, Marta Labarr, Tamara Desni	Drama	
Trouble Brewing	Anthony Kimmins	George Formby, Googie Withers	Comedy	
Trunk Crime	Roy Boulting	Manning Whiley, Barbara Everest	Thriller	
Two Minutes	Donald Taylor	Walter Hudd, Edana Romney	Drama short	
Wanted by Scotland Yard	Norman Lee	James Stephenson, Betty Lynne	Crime	
What Men Live By	Donald Taylor, Vernon Sewell	Esmond Knight, Eliot Makeham, Olga Lindo	Drama short	
What Would You Do, Chums?	John Baxter	Syd Walker, Jean Gillie	Drama	
Yes, Madam?	Norman Lee	Bobby Howes, Diana Churchill	Musical/comedy	
Young Man's Fancy	Robert Stevenson	Griffith Jones, Anna Lee	Comedy	

== See also ==
- 1939 in British music
- 1939 in British television
- 1939 in the United Kingdom
