= Old Mother Riley =

Fictional character

Arthur Lucan and Kitty McShane as Old Mother Riley and her daughter Kitty

Old Mother Riley is a fictional character portrayed from about 1934 to 1954 by Arthur Lucan and from 1954 to the 1980s by Roy Rolland as part of a British music hall act.

Old Mother Riley (full comedy name: Daphne Bluebell Snowdrop Riley) is an Irish washerwoman and charwoman character, devised by Lucan (born Arthur Towle). His wife Kitty McShane played Old Mother Riley's daughter, Kitty. It was essentially a drag act but also a double act. The couple played music halls, theatres, and broadcast on radio and appeared in films. Lucan was voted sixth biggest British box-office star by the Motion Picture Herald in 1943. In 1939, Jimmy Clitheroe appeared in an Old Mother Riley pantomime called The Old Woman who Lives in a Shoe, and then the following year had a part in the film, Old Mother Riley in Society. The Film Fun comic included an "Old Mother Riley" strip cartoon in the 1940s.

Old Mother Riley was the first and arguably the most influential drag act on stage and screen. Although nothing like the glamorous acts like Danny La Rue, Old Mother Riley proved that drag could be a smash hit with audiences and make you a star. The Old Mother Riley films also proved that drag could be an acceptable part of comedy and storytelling. Previous to Old Mother Riley, drag was a mixture of singing acts and short comedy sketches in music halls across the UK.

Roy Rolland was Lucan's understudy and stand-in, and after Lucan's death in 1954 he continued to play the Old Mother Riley character in pantomime, on television and in cabaret until the 1980s.

The character and show exist in a comic lineage that extends to Mrs. Brown's Boys.

== Old Mother Riley films ==
Made on a minuscule budget, but extremely profitable, 16 of the 18 films made by Arthur Lucan featured him as Old Mother Riley:

- Stars on Parade (1936)
- Bridget's Night Out (1936)
- Kathleen Mavourneen (1937)
- Old Mother Riley (1937)
- Old Mother Riley in Paris (1938)
- Old Mother Riley, MP (1939)
- Old Mother Riley Joins Up (1940)
- Old Mother Riley in Society (1940)
- Old Mother Riley in Business (1941)
- Old Mother Riley's Circus (1941)
- Old Mother Riley's Ghosts (1941)
- Old Mother Riley Overseas (1943)
- Old Mother Riley Detective (1943)
- Old Mother Riley at Home (1945)
- Old Mother Riley's New Venture (1949)
- Old Mother Riley Headmistress (1950)
- Old Mother Riley's Jungle Treasure (1951)
- Mother Riley Meets the Vampire (1952) – co-stars Bela Lugosi.

== See also ==
- Drag queen

== Sources ==
- Robert V Kenny, The Man Who Was Old Mother Riley - The Lives and Films of Arthur Lucan and Kitty McShane, BearManor Media, 2014, 428pp.
- "Old Mother Riley : The Life and Career of Arthur Lucan"
