= Old Mother Riley Overseas =

- ABC cinemas British movie card
- Directed by: Oswald Mitchell
- Written by: H. Fowler Mear; Arthur Lucan (additional scenes)
- Story by: L.S. Deacon; Albert Mee
- Produced by: Oswald Mitchell
- Starring: Arthur Lucan; Kitty McShane; Morris Harvey
- Cinematography: Gerald Gibbs
- Edited by: Lito Carruthers
- Music by: Percival Mackey
- Production company: British National Films
- Distributed by: Anglo-American Film Corporation
- Release date: 1943
- Running time: 80 minutes
- Country: United Kingdom
- Language: English

Old Mother Riley Overseas is a 1943 British comedy film directed by Oswald Mitchell and starring Arthur Lucan, Kitty McShane and Morris Harvey. It was written by H. Fowler Mear and Lucan. Old Mother Riley relocates to Portugal.

== Plot summary ==
Mother Riley is tricked out of her licence for a pub, and heads for Portugal to find her daughter who is working in the wine business. Along the way she is somehow mistaken for a famous pianist, but arrives in Portugal just in time to prevent her daughter from being kidnapped. She also manages to retrieve stolen port wine.

== Cast ==
- Arthur Lucan as Mrs. Riley
- Kitty McShane as Kitty Riley
- Morris Harvey as Barnacle Bill
- Fred Kitchen as Pedro Quentos
- Sebastian Cabot as bar steward
- Magda Kun
- Anthony Holles
- Ferdy Mayne
- Freddie William Breach
- Bob Lloyd
- Paul Erickson
- Eda Bell
- Ruth Meredith

== Critical reception ==
The Monthly Film Bulletin wrote: "The plot is slight, but there is plenty of comic banter and simple fun, and the many admirers of the famous pair will enjoy their further adventures overseas."

Kine Weekly wrote: "Spectacular musical extravaganza, the latest of the Old Mother Rileys, telling how the fruity, good humoured harridan, ex-licensee of a Cornish pub, and her comely daughter find adventure and romance sunny Portugal. The widely flung tale is not productive of a great number of riotous situations, but Arthur Lucan, who, happily, is at the top of his form, gets the most out of what there are. The support is adequate, the staging colourful and the song numbers tuneful."

TV Guide wrote: "Following the successful formula of Old Mother Riley in Paris, this less impressive series entry has Lucan traveling to Portugal."
