= Three Men in a Boat (disambiguation) =

Three Men in a Boat is an 1889 novel by Jerome K. Jerome.

Three Men in a Boat may also refer to:

- Three Men in a Boat (1920 film), a British silent film based on the 1889 novel
- Three Men in a Boat (1933 film), a British film based on the 1889 novel
- Three Men in a Boat (1956 film), a British film based on the 1889 novel
- Three Men in a Boat (1961 film), a German film based on the 1889 novel
- Three Men in a Boat (1975 film), a British television film based on the 1889 novel
- Three Men in a Boat (1979 film), a Soviet two-part musical-comedy miniseries
- Three Men in a Boat (TV series), based on the 1889 novel
