= Old Mother Riley at Home =

1945 British film by Oswald Mitchell

- Directed by: Oswald Mitchell
- Written by: George A. Cooper; Oswald Mitchell
- Story by: Joan Butler; Ralph Temple
- Produced by: Louis H. Jackson
- Starring: Arthur Lucan; Kitty McShane; Freddie Forbes
- Cinematography: James Wilson
- Edited by: Douglas Myers
- Music by: Percival Mackey
- Production company: British National Films
- Distributed by: Anglo-American Film Corporation
- Release date: 24 December 1945 (UK)
- Running time: 76 minutes
- Country: United Kingdom
- Language: English

Old Mother Riley at Home is a 1945 British comedy film directed by Oswald Mitchell and starring Arthur Lucan, Kitty McShane and Freddie Forbes. It was written by George A. Cooper and Mitchell from a story by Joan Butler. It is the 11th film in the long-running Old Mother Riley series.

== Plot summary ==
Mother Riley's daughter Kitty has run off with her new and (so says Mother Riley), "no good" boyfriend. With the aid of Kitty's true love Dan, Mother Riley tracks the runaways and discovers them in a gambling den.

== Cast ==
- Arthur Lucan as Mrs Riley
- Kitty McShane as Kitty Riley
- Freddie Forbes as Mr Bumpton
- Richard George as Dan
- Willer Neal as Bill
- Wally Patch as bouncer
- Kenneth Warrington as boss
- Angela Barrie as duchess
- Janet Morriso as Mary
- Elsie Wagstaff as Mrs Ginochie
- Henry B. Longhurst as commissionaire

== Reception ==
The Monthly Film Bulletin wrote: "The film offers ample scope for the violent quarrels and rough-and-tumble kind of humour associated with the work of the well-known variety team Lucan and McShane, who, of course, are starred in this latest of the 'Mother Riley' series. Richard George, as Dan, is an adequate if scarcely a romantic 'hero', but Willer Neal as the 'menace' (Bill) must, one feels, have been chosen for the part on the strength of a moderately tuneful singing voice rather than for any pronounced acting ability. Direction leaves much to be desired, but there are one or two surprisingly lavish sets for a film of this type which lend a mild interest."

Kine Weekly wrote: "Latest of British National's 'Mother Riley' series shows the old lady in a more domesticated, but no less hilarious mood, than in her recent adventures."

TV Guide called the film "one of the weaker series entries."
