= Henry Longhurst (actor) =

British actor (1891–1970)

- in Murder Ahoy! (1964)
- Born: Henry Birt Longhurst; February 1891; Brighton, Sussex, England
- Died: April 11, 1970 (aged 79); Reading, Berkshire England
- Occupation: Actor

Henry B. Longhurst (February 1891 in Brighton, Sussex – 11 April 1970 in Reading, Berkshire) was a British actor.

== Selected filmography ==
=== Film ===
- Chin Chin Chinaman (1931) - Purser
- The Crooked Lady (1932) - John Morland
- When London Sleeps (1932) - Inspector Bradley
- Let Me Explain, Dear (1932) - Dr. Coote
- A Safe Proposition (1932) - Sergeant Crouch
- My Lucky Star (1933) - Dudley Collins
- Letting in the Sunshine (1933) - (uncredited)
- Dangerous Ground (1934) - Inspector Hurley
- Over the Garden Wall (1934) - Minor role (uncredited)
- Blossom Time (1934) - Minor role (uncredited)
- Menace (1934) - (uncredited)
- I Spy (1934) - Police Constable
- Murder at Monte Carlo (1935) - Editor
- Abdul the Damned (1935) - General of the Bodyguards
- Bulldog Jack (1935) - Melvor (uncredited)
- The Vandergilt Diamond Mystery (1936) - Inspector Greig
- Under Proof (1936) - Inspector Holt
- Sweeney Todd: The Demon Barber of Fleet Street (1936) - Man On The Quayside Who Talks To Sweeney Todd (uncredited)
- The Avenging Hand (1936) - Streeter
- Jack of All Trades (1936) - Party Guest (uncredited)
- For Valour (1937) - Inspector Harding
- Crackerjack (1938) - Insp. Lunt
- Old Mother Riley, MP (1939) - Henry Wicker
- Sailors Don't Care (1940) - Adm. Drake
- Gasbags (1941) - Woodcutter (uncredited)
- Old Mother Riley's Ghosts (1941)
- Let the People Sing (1942)
- A Place of One's Own (1945) - Inspector
- Perfect Strangers (1945) - Petty Officer
- Old Mother Riley at Home (1945) - Commissionaire
- The Long Dark Hall (1951) - Judge
- Lady Godiva Rides Again (1951) - Soap director
- His Excellency (1952) - Lord Kynaston
- Time Gentlemen, Please! (1952) - PC Tumball
- Circumstantial Evidence (1952) - Bolton
- The Captain's Paradise (1953) - Prof. Killick
- The Red Beret (1953) - Minor Role (uncredited)
- Eight O'Clock Walk (1954) - Clerk of Court (uncredited)
- Diplomatic Passport (1954) - Jonathan (uncredited)
- The Belles of St. Trinian's (1954) - Doctor (uncredited)
- Mad About Men (1954) - Mayor (uncredited)
- The Quatermass Xperiment (1955) - George - Maggie's Father (uncredited)
- Touch and Go (1955) - Mr. Pritchett
- Private's Progress (1956) - Mr. Spottiswood
- Keep It Clean (1956) - Magistrate
- Brothers in Law (1957) - Rev. Arthur Thursby
- Lucky Jim (1957) - Professor Hutchinson
- Gideon's Day (1958) - Reverend Courtney, the vicar
- A Touch of Larceny (1959) - Club Member
- A French Mistress (1960) - Second Governor
- The Night We Got the Bird (1961) - Vicar
- Heavens Above! (1963) - Deaf Gentleman
- Murder Ahoy! (1964) - Cecil Ffolly Hardwicke (uncredited)
- Young Cassidy (1965) - Doctor
- Circus of Fear (1966) - Henry, Hotel Porter

=== Television ===
- The Diary of Samuel Pepys (1958) – Speaker of the House of Commons
