= Mother Riley Meets the Vampire =

1952 British film by John Gilling

- Theatrical release poster
- Directed by: John Gilling
- Screenplay by: Val Valentine
- Story by: Val Valentine; Richard Gordon
- Produced by: George Minter (executive producer, uncredited); John Gilling (producer); Stanley Couzins (associate producer)
- Starring: Arthur Lucan; Bela Lugosi
- Cinematography: Stanley Pavey
- Edited by: Leonard Trumm
- Music by: Lindo Southworth
- Production company: Fernwood Productions
- Distributed by: Renown Pictures (UK)
- Release date: June 1952; (UK)
- Running time: 74 minutes
- Country: United Kingdom
- Language: English

Mother Riley Meets the Vampire (also known as Vampire Over London and My Son, the Vampire) is a 1952 British horror comedy film directed by John Gilling, starring Arthur Lucan and Bela Lugosi, with Dora Bryan. It was written by Val Valentine and Richard Gordon and filmed at Nettlefold Studios.

This was the final film of the Old Mother Riley film series, and did not feature Lucan's wife and business partner Kitty McShane, from whom he had separated in 1951.

== Plot ==
Several young women are missing, and the newspapers offer sensational headlines: "Is It the Vampire?" Prof. Von Housen, who believes himself to be a vampire, seeks world domination from his headquarters in London. His master plan has him commanding an army of 50,000 radar-controlled robots that are powered by uranium. Unfortunately he only has one robot, and he doesn't even have that because it's arriving by freight from a European agent. Von Housen's latest kidnap victim is Julia Loretti, who has a map to a uranium mine that he needs for his robot army.

Mother Riley, a struggling shopkeeper, receives word that she has inherited her late uncle's effects. A shipping error sends Mrs. Riley's package to Von Housen, while the robot is sent to Mrs. Riley. Von Housen activates the robot by remote control, and orders it to abduct Mother Riley and take her to his headquarters.

Mrs. Riley is delighted by Von Housen's persuasive entreaties -- he is fascinated by her blood type, and he promises to feed her steak and liver "with the blood oozing out of it." She agrees to be his live-in servant, but her contentment turns to terror when she observes all the ominous activity in the Von Housen household. She frees the captive Julia and sends chambermaid Tilly to the police. When Von Housen and his staff decamp to a steamship, Mrs. Riley grimly trails them to the pier by whatever means are available. Von Housen's gang is arrested, and Mrs. Riley goes overboard into the sea, where she is thrown a life belt.

== Cast ==
- Arthur Lucan as Old Mother Riley
- Bela Lugosi as Prof. Von Housen
- María Mercedes as Julia Loretti
- Dora Bryan as Tilly
- Philip Leaver as Anton Daschomb
- Richard Wattis as PC Freddie
- Graham Moffatt as the yokel
- Roderick Lovell as Douglas
- David Hurst as Mugsy
- Judith Furse as Freda
- Ian Wilson as Hitchcock, the butler
- Hattie Jacques as Mrs. Jenks
- Dandy Nichols as Mrs. Mott
- Cyril Smith as Mr. Paine, the rent collector
- Lawrence Naismith as police sergeant
- Bill Shine as Mugsy's assistant
- John Le Mesurier as Scotland Yard officer (uncredited)

== Production ==
At the suggestion of film producer Richard Gordon, Bela Lugosi had traveled to England to appear in a stage play of Dracula. The engagement came to an abrupt halt, when a promoter absconded with the box office receipts and abandoned the cast and crew. Lugosi, stranded, needed money to return to America. Gordon persuaded fellow producer George Minter to use Lugosi in one of his productions. It was felt that Lugosi's presence in the cast might give the new film a chance of success outside Britain.

Lugosi was paid $5,000 for his role. The plot was inspired by Abbott and Costello Meet Frankenstein: Lugosi needs a simpleton in order to carry out his evil plans. The film made clear that Lugosi's character was not a real vampire so that it would get a U certificate, allowing general audiences -- including children, who were Old Mother Riley's biggest audience -- to see it. Arthur Lucan's double Roy Rolland stood in for him in the film's more physical stunts.

Richard Gordon recalled that there were plans to shoot additional scenes with Lugosi and without Arthur Lucan for the American market, but the idea was never put into motion.

Lugosi was offered the lead in a proposed 1953 sequel produced by J. Arthur Rank, on the condition that Lugosi had to travel back to England to appear in it, but he was too ill to travel. Producer Alex Gordon proposed inserting newly filmed Hollywood footage of Lugosi into the Mother Riley film to create an extended version titled King Robot, but that project was also abandoned: by 1953, Lugosi's physical appearance failed to match the earlier footage of himself.

== Release ==
Mother Riley Meets the Vampire was released in the United Kingdom in July 1952, to indifferent response. Its lackluster business ended the long-running series. Eliot Hyman acquired the American distribution rights to the film, now retitled Vampire over London, from producer George Minter in February 1952, but did not exercise them, nor did he add the film to his TV-syndication library.

Independent American distributor Jack H. Harris had imported Laurel and Hardy's European feature Atoll K in 1954 and adapted it for American audiences as Utopia. Nine years later, he updated another old, obscure import -- Mother Riley Meets the Vampire -- for American theaters. His original intention was to market it as Carry On, Vampire, one of the popular British Carry On comedies, only to be sued by Anglo-Amalgamated, the Carry On producers. Harris then hired comedian Allan Sherman, then a recording star with his My Son, the Folk Singer album, to compose a theme song for the Lucan-Lugosi film and sing it for a new title sequence. The song was My Son, the Vampire, which became the new film title. In September 1963 Harris went after the children's-matinée audience by booking the film into 100 theaters in the Philadelphia, Pennsylvania area, followed by similar saturation bookings in Washington D. C. and Baltimore, Maryland. In December, Harris booked My Son, the Vampire into drive-ins in the same cities as part of a horror triple feature.

The film went into television syndication in 1965 but continued to play regionally in American theaters through 1971, when Harris closed his branch offices in the western United States. The film was taken over by distributor Newton P. Jacobs for his Favorite Films enterprise.

It didn't return to theaters until 1979, when a New York revival house offered a Bela Lugosi double bill of White Zombie and Vampire over London.

== Reception ==
Reviews in Great Britain ranged from charitable to execrable. Kine Weekly wrote:

Comedy thriller, combining the exuberance of Arthur (Old Mother Riley) Lucan with the fruity macabre of Bela Lugosi. ... Simple fun and hearty shocks, plus compelling title and star values, make it a sound attraction for the masses and youngsters, Good popular 'quota'. ... The picture is a trifle laboured at the start and the most is not made of the vampire asides, but, no matter, laughs and thrills, fashioned in an evergreen mould, pile up towards the finish. Arthur Lucan puts over his famous dame act with characteristic aplomb and sings a catchy ditty as Old Mother Riley and Bela Lugosi, although restrained, makes an effective foil as Von Housen. The final schemozzle in which bicycle, motor-cycle and old crock car are employed is excellently timed and aptly rounds off the zany, cunningly cast low-life extravaganza.

The Daily Film Renter wrote: "The vigorous action, the unabashed corn displayed by the two leading characters, the adequate settings and passable support, make it fair enough in its own particular class."

Picturegoer wrote: "Now that Abbott and Costello have Met The Ghosts, it looks as though all the other slapstick comedians are queueing up to have a go. But if we're in for a comedy-thriller cycle, let's hope that those to come are more efficiently put together than this lumbering collection of badly timed chestnuts. True, Arthur Lucan is in vigorous form, and Bela Lugosi gives one of his liveliest performances, but the script defeats them both. The most irritating aspect of the film is that it wastes so many talented stage players, such as Dora Bryan, Richard Wattis and Judith Furse. In these surroundings they look incompetent, which assuredly they are not."

The Monthly Film Bulletin reviewer was blunt and brutally frank: "Stupid, humourless, and repulsive."

Only one American critic bothered to review it, Sol Abraham of the Baltimore Sun, who invited lovers of bad cinema to try it: "This is an awful, a really awful, a ferociously awful movie, and if you want to spend a deliriously joyful hour, don't miss it. No low comedy is beneath Mrs. Riley... her whole act was built around effects that were so dreadfully unfunny that they came out hilarious. There's a lot more of Lugosi, a lot more of Mrs. Riley, a lot more of the most feeble, least sensible movie around. You'll love it."
