= Old Mother Riley Headmistress =

Old Mother Riley, Headmistress
- UK theatrical poster
- Directed by: John Harlow
- Screenplay by: Ted Kavanagh; John Harlow
- Story by: Jackie Marks; Con West
- Produced by: Gordon D. Myers
- Starring: Arthur Lucan; Kitty McShane; The Luton Girls Choir
- Cinematography: James Wilson
- Edited by: Douglas Myers
- Music by: George Melachrino; Arthur E. Davies (Choral Director) Luton Girls Choir)
- Production company: Harry Reynolds Productions
- Distributed by: Renown Pictures
- Release date: 1950
- Running time: 75 minutes
- Country: United Kingdom
- Language: English

Old Mother Riley, Headmistress is a low-budget black-and-white 1950 British comedy film directed by John Harlow and starring Arthur Lucan and Kitty McShane. The screenplay was by Ted Kavanagh and Harlow from a story by Jackie Marks and Con West. The 13th film in the Old Mother Riley series, it features the Luton Girls Choir playing many of Mother Riley's pupils.

== Plot ==
Kitty is sacked from her job as music teacher at an exclusive girls' school, but Mother Riley unexpectedly comes into an inheritance, and decides to buy the girls’ finishing school to give Kitty her job back.

Mother Riley soon establishes herself as headmistress at St. Mildred's School for Young Ladies, and throws herself into her new role with vigour – whether it is taking P.E. lessons, brazenly cheating on Sports Day, or confronting the haunted school piano.

== Cast ==
- Arthur Lucan as Daphne Snowdrop Bluebell Riley
- Kitty McShane as Kitty Riley
- The Luton Girls Choir as school choir
- Willer Neal as Bill Travers
- Cyril Smith as Maltby
- C. Denier Warren as Clifton Hill
- Enid Hewitt as Miss Helen Carruthers
- Paul Sheridan as Nixon
- Harry Herbert as Simon
- Oswald Waller as Copeland
- Jenny Mathot as Mlle Leblanc
- Myrette Morven as Miss Chester
- Ethel Royal as Lady Meersham
- Bill Stephens as mayor
- Catherine Carleton as Miss Ashton
- Dorothy Darke as Mrs Shaw
- Vi Kaley as 1st laundry girl
- Jaqueline Stanley as 2nd laundry girl
- Beth Ross as Maisie
- Madge Brindley as Mrs Clarke
- Pamela Hill as woman
- Graham Tonbridge as chauffeur
- Patricia Owens, Genine Graham, Joy Frankau, Betty Benson, Mary Thompson, Suzanne Wilde, Doorn Van Steyne, Coral Woods, Joy Adams, Cora Farrel, Sally Owen, Lyn James, Ursula Hopwood, and Diana Connell as girls

== Critical reception ==
Kine Weekly wrote: "The picture is somewhat loosely put together, but The Luton Girls' Choir, aided and abetted by lightly-clad PT exponents, effectually punctuates its laughs and strengthens both its entertainment and its billing. Well staged, it should easily win the approval of Mother Riley fans, who, we understand, are legion."

Picturegoer wrote: "Definitely not one of the best of the series. There are few of the funny situations which have brought fame to Arthur Lucan and his wife, Kitty McShane, in the past. Many of the jokes are on the corny side."

Picture Show wrote: "Arthur Lucan, of course, dominates this slapstick frolic in his role as Old Mother Riley. ... Hearty fun for Riley addicts."

In British Sound Films: The Studio Years 1928–1959 David Quinlan rated the film as "poor", writing: "One of the briefest and weakest oif the series."

TV Guide noted, "a poor addition to the "Old Mother Riley" stable... If you see only one "Old Mother Riley" film in your lifetime, don't make it this one."
