= The Dummy Talks =

1943 British film by Oswald Mitchell

- Directed by: Oswald Mitchell
- Written by: Michael Barringer
- Based on: story by Jack Clifford; Con West
- Produced by: Wallace Orton
- Starring: Jack Warner; Claude Hulbert; Beryl Orde
- Cinematography: James Wilson
- Edited by: Jack Harris; Fergus McDonell
- Music by: Kennedy Russell (uncredited)
- Production company: British National Films
- Distributed by: Anglo-American Film Corporation (UK)
- Release date: 25 October 1943 (UK)
- Running time: 85 minutes
- Country: United Kingdom
- Language: English

The Dummy Talks is a 1943 British crime film directed by Oswald Mitchell and starring Jack Warner, Claude Hulbert and Beryl Orde. It was written by Michael Barringer from a story by Con West and Jack Clifford, and marked the film debut of Jack Warner.

== Synopsis ==
Set over the course of one night, the story takes place in and around a London theatre. A series of contemporary acts are seen both performing on stage and socialising backstage. The murder of a ventriloquist takes place and two policemen, who happen to be at the theatre tracking a banknote forger, set to work finding the culprit. Ultimately, the key suspects are rounded up and a mind-reader puts on a show to reveal the killer. He's helped by a midget dressed as the dummy, hence the title.

== Cast ==
- Jack Warner as Jack
- Claude Hulbert as Victor Harbord
- Beryl Orde as Beryl
- Evelyn Darvell as Peggy
- Hy Hazell as Maya (credited as Derna Hazell)
- Manning Whiley as Russell Warren
- Charles Carson as Marvello ("The Man With the Radio Mind")
- G. H. Mulcaster as Piers Harriman
- John Carol as Jimmy Royce
- Gordon Edwards as Marcus
- Max Earl as Yates
- Ivy Benson and her All Ladies Band as themselves
- Frederick Sylvester & Nephew (Eric Mudd also played the "dummy") as themselves
- Tommy Manley & Florence Austin ("Music Hath Charms") as themselves
- Cecil Ayres with the Skating Avalons as themselves
- Mann & Read ("Jugglers with Fun") as themselves
- Five Lai Founs ("Modern Chinese Wonders") as themselves
- Jeannie White and her Stepsisters as themselves

== Critical reception ==
The Monthly Film Bulletin wrote: "The rather flimsy story has been contrived as a peg on which to hang a number of well-known musichall turns. Jack Warner, Beryl Orde, and half a dozen other well-known artistes are shown doing their acts, and this rather upsets the film's continuity. The principal protagonists in the plot are Claude Hulbert, who gives one of his usual performances as a scatterbrained war reserve policeman; G. H. Mulcaster, who is a rather too sinister detective; and Beryl Orde, who shows that she has an attractive screen as well as radio personality."

Kine Weekly wrote: "It would not be quite accurate to say that variety never gets in the way of the development of thd erime theme, and other times when vaudeville appears to suffer irritating straight play interruptions, but although each department occasionally poaches on the other's preserves, ihe general effect, the overall picture, is both exciting and effective. 'I'hi stars, with their ready-made audiences, further increase ihe prospects of a sound British novelty attraction."

Britmovie noted "a number of genuine variety acts add a flavour of the period, although they provide rather too much of the film’s running time".

TV Guide called it "a weird but engaging second feature."
