= Jailbirds (1940 film) =

1940 film

- Directed by: Oswald Mitchell
- Written by: Con West (screenplay); Oswald Mitchell (scenario)
- Based on: the famous stage comedy by Fred Karno
- Produced by: F. W. Baker
- Starring: Harry Terry; Albert Burdon; Shaun Glenville
- Cinematography: Geoffrey Faithfull
- Edited by: Cecil H. Williamson
- Music by: Percival Mackey
- Production company: Butcher's Film Service
- Distributed by: Butcher's Film Service (UK)
- Release date: February 1940 (UK)
- Running time: 73 minutes
- Country: United Kingdom
- Language: English

Jailbirds is a 1940 British second feature ('B') comedy crime film directed by Oswald Mitchell and starring Albert Burdon, Harry Terry and Charles Farrell. It was written by Con West and Mitchell based on a theatrical sketch by Fred Karno.

== Plot summary ==
After escaping from prison two criminals attempt to hide stolen jewels in a loaf of bread. However it accidentally gets sent to the wrong house leading to their ultimate capture.

== Cast ==
- Albert Burdon as Bill Smith
- Harry Terry as Narky
- Shaun Glenville as Col. Pepper
- Charles Farrell as Spike Nelson
- Charles Hawtrey as Nick
- Lorraine Clewes as Mary Smith
- Sylvia Coleridge as Mrs. Smith
- Cyril Chamberlain as Bob
- Nat Mills as Mr. Popodopoulos
- Bobbie MacCauley as Mrs. Popodopoulos

== Critical reception ==
The Monthly Film Bulletin wrote: "This crazy and fantastic story is put over with immense gusto and tireless energy on the part of the cast. No attempt at subtlety is made. It is content to be riotous and robust entertainment of the characteristically music hall type. Many of the gags are old friends. They are none the less ludicrous and laughter-provoking for that. There are amusing scenes in a police court and in a bakehouse, and slapstick sequences in prison, Much rests on Albert Burdon's shoulders. He is practically never off the screen and clowns and fools his way through with verve and energy. The other players support him loyally, and the technical presentation is adequate."

Kine Weekly wrote: "Rbust prison comedy extravaganza, suggested by Fred Karno's famous music-hall sketch. There is very little resemblance to the original and the treatment is unpretentious, but the entertainment, nevertheless, generously caters for the masses and the family through its exuberant, if ingenuous, fn. Tireless and versatile team work are the secret of its obvious success.Title and star values will do the rest. Capital light booking for the crowd. " In British Sound Films: The Studio Years 1928–1959 David Quinlan rated the film as "average", writing: "Crazy farce, prettyriotous at times."

TV Guide called it "Funnier than most British comedies of the time," and rated it two out of four stars.
