= Old Mother Riley's New Venture =

- Opening titles
- Directed by: John Harlow
- Written by: Jack Marks; Con West; John Harlow (additional scenes)
- Produced by: Harry Reynolds
- Starring: Arthur Lucan; Kitty McShane; Chili Bouchier
- Cinematography: James Wilson
- Edited by: Adam Alexander Dawson
- Music by: George Melachrino
- Production company: Harry Reynolds Productions
- Distributed by: Renown Pictures
- Release date: July 1949; (UK)
- Running time: 79 minutes
- Country: United Kingdom
- Language: English

Old Mother Riley's New Venture (also known as Mother Riley's New Venture; U.S. titles Old Mother Riley and A Wild Irish Night) is a 1949 British comedy film directed by John Harlow and starring Arthur Lucan, Kitty McShane and Chili Bouchier. It was written by Jack Marks, Con West and Harlow. It is the twelfth in the series of Old Mother Riley films, and was the first to play in London's West End. It was also the first to be released in the US, where it opened in 1952, as Old Mother Riley, and was later re-released there as A Wild Irish Night.

== Plot summary ==
The owner of a five star London hotel leaves for a holiday, and to everyone's surprise promotes Old Mother Riley from kitchen dishwasher to manageress. Chaos ensues, and Mother Riley and Kitty are suddenly suspects in the theft of the Royal Hula Diamond, but somehow along the way also manage a trip to a beauty parlour, a banquet with Arab royalty, some Saint Patrick's Day celebrations, and a climactic custard pie fight.

== Cast ==
- Arthur Lucan as Old Mother Riley
- Kitty McShane as Kitty Riley
- Chili Bouchier as Cora Gayne
- Willer Neal as David Thompson
- Sebastian Cabot as Potentate
- Wilfred Babbage as Major Gayne
- Maureen Riscoe as Mabel
- Fred Groves as John Grigsby
- C. Denier Warren as Matthew Hillick
- Paul Sheridan as Saunders
- Arthur Gomez as chef
- John Le Mesurier as Karl
- Amando Guinle as Jules
- Grace Arnold as Prison Governor
- Howard Douglas as Dr Collins
- Hugh Dempster as drunk
- Gordon Littman as 1st aide
- Robert Moore as Allan
- George Street as Walters
- James Knight as Police Superintendent
- Blanche Fothergill as Mrs Ginochie
- Brian Royceton as commissionaire
- Pamela Skiff as beauty parlour attendant
- Joy Frankau as beauty parlour attendant

== Critical reception ==
Variety wrote: "Slapstick irish comedy which offers little appeal for most situations. Film's best market appears to lie in 'Irish Night' shows or in neighborhoods where there's a sizable Irish population. ... Arthur Lucan has a thesping field day in the title role."

The Monthly Film Bulletin wrote: "A vivacious slapstick comedy which keeps its pace all through with familiar ingredients, even the kitchen stove and a grand finale of custard pie throwing."

The Digital Fix wrote, "New Venture is essentially unwatchable... Old routines, a bare minimum of laughs and a comic pairing who are, quite frankly, way beyond their best."
