= I Spy (1934 film) =

1934 film

- Directed by: Allan Dwan
- Written by: Allan Dwan; Fred Thompson; Arthur B. Woods
- Produced by: Walter C. Mycroft
- Starring: Sally Eilers; Ben Lyon; Harry Tate
- Cinematography: James Wilson
- Edited by: Leslie Norman
- Music by: Sydney Baynes
- Production company: British International Pictures
- Distributed by: Wardour Films
- Release date: 27 August 1934
- Running time: 69 minutes
- Country: United Kingdom
- Language: English

I Spy is a 1934 British comedy spy film directed by Allan Dwan and starring Sally Eilers, Ben Lyon and Harry Tate. It was shot at the Elstree Studios near London. The film's sets were designed by the art director Wilfred Arnold. Lyon made it at the same time as his wife, Bebe Daniels, was making a film at the same studio British International Pictures. It was the first British film for both Lyon and Sally Eilers. It was distributed in America by Majestic Pictures under the alternative title The Morning After.

== Cast ==
- Sally Eilers as Thelma Coldwater
- Ben Lyon as Wally Sawyer
- Harry Tate as George
- H. F. Maltby as Herr Doctor
- Harold Warrender as NBG
- Andrews Engelmann as CO
- Dennis Hoey as MNT
- Henry Victor as KPO
- Marcelle Rogez as Girl
- Robert Rietty as Boy
- Henry B. Longhurst as Police Constable
- C. Denier Warren as Alphonse
- Stewart Granger as Extra

== Bibliography ==
- Lombardi, Frederic . Allan Dwan and the Rise and Decline of the Hollywood Studios. McFarland, 2013.
- Waldman, Harry. Beyond Hollywood's Grasp: American Filmmakers Abroad, 1914–1945. Bloomsbury Academic, 1994.
