= Stars on Parade (1936 film) =

- Opening titles
- Directed by: Oswald Mitchell; Challis Sanderson
- Written by: Oswald Mitchell
- Produced by: Oswald Mitchell; Challis Sanderson
- Starring: Robb Wilton; Arthur Lucan; Kitty McShane; Sam Barton
- Cinematography: Desmond Dickinson
- Edited by: Challis Sanderson
- Music by: Horace Sheldon
- Production company: Butcher's Film Service
- Distributed by: Butcher's Film Service
- Release date: 1936
- Running time: 81 minutes
- Country: United Kingdom
- Language: English

Stars on Parade (also known as Stars Parade) is a 1936 British musical film directed by Oswald Mitchell and Challis Sanderson and starring a number of music hall acts including Robb Wilton, Arthur Lucan and Kitty McShane. It takes the form of a variety show and was made at Cricklewood Studios in North London as a quota quickie, and released as a first feature on a double bill with the supporting feature What the Puppy Said.

== Synopsis ==
The film has no story, comprising a succession of variety sketches. Edwin Lawrence begins the show with a comedic political speech, followed by comedy dancers Syd and Max Harrison, singer Pat O'Brien, Mabel Constanduros as Mrs. Buggins, Robb Wilton as a police sergeant, Sam Barton's bicycle act, and ilusionist Horace Goldin. Robb Wilton returns, then we meet the comedy inebriate Jimmy James, the Sherman Fisher Girls, The Four Crotchets, vocal impressionist Navarre, and Arthurt Lucan and Kitty McShane.

== Cast ==
- Robb Wilton as Norman, the police sergeant
- Arthur Lucan as Old Mother Riley
- Kitty McShane as Bridget
- Sam Barton as himself
- Mabel Constanduros as Grandma Buggins
- Horace Goldin as himself
- Max Harrison as himself
- Syd Harrison as himself
- Pat Hyde as herself, accordionist
- Jimmy James as himself
- Edwin Laurence as speaker at meeting
- Navarre as himself
- Pat O'Brien as himself
- John Rorke as himself
- The Sherman Fisher Girls as themselves, dancers
- Debroy Somers as himself, bandleader
- Albert Whelan as tea stall proprietor

== Reception ==
The Monthly Film Bulletin wrote: "A series of variety acts put together with only the meanderings of Robb Wilton's policeman and of Jimmy James' 'drunk' for continuity. The production is on a very modest scale including a minimum of sets, there being little camera movement to break up the various acts. A number of these acts ... 'come across' with fair success and include some famous tunes. Backchat, singing, tap-dancing, sketches – in short, a music-hall parade."

Kine Weekly wrote: "Musical revue, a mixed medley of British vaudeville, screen and radio talent manufactured from the recipe that proved so successful in Variety. The directorial work and technical presentation lack much of the sparkle and pep associated with the best American product, but to counteract the shortcomings in showmanship there is a friendly, intimate native homeliness."

The Daily Film Renter wrote: "Pot-pourri of well-known variety and radio acts, with continuity provided by interpolation of Robb Wilton's familiar police station turn. Most successful items supplied by Lucan and McShane in superb knockabout; Sam Barton and his 'bike'; Navarre, with impersonations; Four Crochets; and Debroy Somers and his Band. Taken as characteristic vaudeville bill, subject should prove very popular with devotees of the music hall. Essentially a variety performance on celluloid, this show is quite frankly a series of turns, some of which are extremely good, and others but moderately amusing."
