= King of Hearts (1936 film) =

- Contemporary advertisement
- Directed by: Oswald Mitchell; Walter Tennyson
- Written by: Oswald Mitchell; Walter Tennyson
- Based on: play by Matthew Boulton
- Produced by: Oswald Mitchell; Walter Tennyson
- Starring: Will Fyffe; Richard Dolman; Amy Veness; Googie Withers
- Cinematography: Desmond Dickinson
- Music by: Horace Sheldon
- Production company: Butcher's Film Service
- Distributed by: Butcher's Film Service
- Release date: March 1936
- Running time: 82 minutes
- Country: United Kingdom
- Language: English

King of Hearts (also known as Little Gel) is a 1936 British romance film directed by Oswald Mitchell and Walter Tennyson and starring Will Fyffe, Richard Dolman and Googie Withers. It was written by Mitchell and Tennyson based on the play by Matthew Boulton, and was produced by Butcher's Film Service at Cricklewood Studios in London.

The film was re-released in 1940 as Little Gel.

== Preservation status ==
The British Film Institute National Archive holds a collection of ephemera and stills but no film or video materials.

== Synopsis ==
A working-class boy falls in love with a working-class girl.

== Cast ==
- Will Fyffe as Bill Saunders
- Gwenllian Gill as May Saunders
- Richard Dolman as Jack Ponsonby
- Amy Veness as Mrs Ponsonby
- O. B. Clarence as Mr Ponsonby
- Jock McKay as George
- Googie Withers as Elaine
- Margaret Davidge as Mrs Saunders
- Ronald Shiner as Tomkins
- Patrick Ludlow as Reggie

== Reception ==
The Monthly Film Bulletin wrote: "The acting and sets are good; especially the acting of Will Fyffe, as the girl's father, and he is well supported by Margaret Davidge and O. B. Clarence. The story is weak, and the arguments used to justify the marriage are childish. One is tempted to sympathize with the boy's mother, although she is portrayed unsympathetically. Will Fyffe gives a good song in the local pub and there are some good shots of the interested listeners."

Kine Weekly wrote: "Delightful, domestic romantic comedy, presenting a new and homely interpretation of the eternal Cinderella Theme. The role of modern good fairy is entrusted to Will Fyffe, the clever Scottish character comedian equally popular on the stage and radio, and his artistry, versatility and shrewd native wit considerably enrich the human and refreshing theme. The middle course between the robust and the sentimental is pursued with commendable consistency, and this permits the wholesome entertainment encompassed by the film to lay claim to universal appeal."
