= Sailors Don't Care (1940 film) =

- Directed by: Oswald Mitchell
- Screenplay by: Oswald Mitchell; Kenneth Horne (additional dialogue & scenes)
- Starring: Tom Gamble; Edward Rigby; Jean Gillie
- Cinematography: Geoffrey Faithfull
- Edited by: Jack Harris
- Music by: Percival Mackey (musical director)
- Production company: Butcher's Film Service
- Distributed by: Butcher's Film Service (UK)
- Release date: 28 December 1940 (UK)
- Running time: 79 min.
- Country: United Kingdom
- Language: English

Sailors Don't Care is a 1940 British comedy film directed by Oswald Mitchell and starring Michael Wilding, Edward Rigby and Jean Gillie. It was written by Kenneth Horne. The film follows the antics of some River Patrol Service men on the trail of spies.

== Plot ==
Joe Clarke and his son Nobby volunteer to operate a Home Defence listening post on the ship Terrific. Unwittingly they get involved in intrigue involving enemy agents and a time bomb.

== Cast ==
- Tom Gamble as Nobby Clark
- Edward Rigby as Joe Clark
- Jean Gillie as Nancy
- Michael Wilding as Dick
- Marion Gerth as Mimi
- Mavis Villiers as Blondie
- G. H. Mulcaster as Admiral Reynolds
- John Salew as Henri
- Henry B. Longhurst as Admiral Drake
- Dennis Wyndham as Captain Raleigh

== Reception ==
The Monthly Film Bulletin wrote: "This is a simple slapstick type of film with good horseplay laughs. It is not very fast-moving but it fulfils the job for which it was intended and the characters are the familiar ones of a W. W. Jacobs' story."

Kine Weekly wrote: "Topical rather than subtle, the film extracts any amount of good fun from the exigencies of war. It also introduces a number of laughable thrills."
