= Old Mother Riley (film) =

- Front of house re-release (1942) still
- Directed by: Oswald Mitchell
- Written by: John Argyle; Con West
- Produced by: Norman Hope-Bell
- Starring: Arthur Lucan; Kitty McShane; Barbara Everest; Patrick Ludlow
- Cinematography: Jack Parker
- Edited by: Challis Sanderson
- Music by: Horace Sheldon
- Production company: Butcher's Film Service
- Distributed by: Butcher's Film Service
- Release date: August 1937 (UK)
- Running time: 75 minutes
- Country: United Kingdom
- Language: English
- Budget: £2,000

Old Mother Riley (also known as The Return of Old Mother Riley and Original Old Mother Riley) is a 1937 British comedy film directed by Oswald Mitchell and starring Arthur Lucan, Kitty McShane, Barbara Everest, Patrick Ludlow and Hubert Leslie. It was written by John Argyle and Con West.

The film was re-released in Britain in 1941.

Mother Riley and her daughter stop the plans of some disinherited relatives to overturn the terms of a will.

== Plot ==
In his will, a wealthy match magnate leaves his fortune to his family, the only condition being that they must take in the first person they see selling matches. Very soon they are blessed with the presence of a loud Irish washerwoman, Old Mother Riley. Chaos ensues, as her presence in the household, and that of her daughter, Kitty, proves unwelcome.

== Cast ==
- Arthur Lucan as Mrs Riley
- Kitty McShane as Kitty Riley
- Barbara Everest as Mrs Briggs
- Patrick Ludlow as Edwin Briggs
- Hubert Leslie as Captain Lawson
- Edith Sharpe as Matilda Lawson
- Syd Crossley as Butler
- Edgar Driver as Bill Jones
- Dorothy Vernon as Aggie Sparks
- Balliol & Tiller as themselves

== Production ==
This is the first in a series of films made between 1937 and 1952, featuring Arthur Lucan's elderly drag character, and her daughter Kitty. After small roles in the Irish Kathleen Mavourneen (1937), Lucan and McShane were approached to star in their own film, Old Mother Riley. The film was cheaply made (it cost £2,000, taking six weeks to shoot) and based on their music hall sketch "The Matchseller". Old Mother Riley was a box office success and Old Mother Riley in Paris (1938) soon followed.

== Critical reception ==
The Monthly Film Bulletin wrote: "This comedy has quite a good story, but loses much of its appeal on account of exaggerated treatment. ... Old Mother Riley is im-personated by Arthur Lucan, but with such exaggeration that what might have been clever, becomes sheer clowning."

Kine Weekly wrote: "Ingenuous and hearty comedy, which depends largely on staging, but vigorous fooling of dame comedian. Humour is tailored to popular taste, however, and should go down well enough in houses catering for the masses. ... The story is rather thin and theatrical, with the comedy following the familiar lines of lower-class gaucherie in a Mayfair mansion. Dialogue is mostly on the pattern of music-hall cross-talk patter flowing in a seemingly inexhaustible stream. Songs and an excellent dance number by Balliol and Tiller are neatly introduced to help out the humour."

The Daily Film Renter wrote: "Rollicking and robust farce-comedy of aged crone's adventures in Society developed on music hall lines. Deliberate absence of subtlety balanced by genuine gusto with which Lucan and McShane play their parts. Sound production and photography, simple straightforward story, and radio and variety reputation of stars coupled with broad, unsophisticated humour, makes it box-office, and eminently suitable for consumption by the masses."

TV Guide commented that "far from being impressive cinema, the "Old Mother Riley" series provided for some innocuous and occasionally hysterical entertainment."
