= Jack Stanford =

English actor and perfomer (1900–1968)

Jack Stanford (26 June, 1900 – 29 April, 1968) was an English actor, singer, dancer and mime. He is known for his "eccentric" dance style, which featured unusual versatility, frenetic motion, optical illusions and acrobatic motion. Stanford's nickname was The Dancing Fool.

== Early life, family and education ==
Stanford was born Charles Finnegan Williams in Colchester, Essex, England. His mother was Eliza (née Finnegan) Williams, and his father, Harold Hearne Williams, was a chemist. Charles and his sisters Ida and Laurie were raised mainly in Outwood.

Stanford often performed in clothing which accentuated his dancing style. His dance routines included sliding, hopping, and elements of tap dancing.

== Career ==
Stanford's career of live performances and motion pictures spanned more than four decades and was at its height in the 1930s and 1940s. He toured Western Europe in the 1920s, headlining alongside Josephine Baker at the Folies Bergère in Paris. Venues where he danced included music halls in the 1920s as well Brighton Hippodrome, the London Pavilion and the London Palladium (which once included in the audience King George VI and Queen Elizabeth). In 1939 he appeared in the film Music Hall Parade. He acted in The Arcadians at Streatham Hill Theatre in 1956. He retired in 1967.

== Personal life ==
Stanford began residing in Battersea, South London, England, in the 1930s. He and his wife Marjorie (née Horstead, one of the Volonoff Twins), had a daughter, actress Jill Stanford.

Stanford died in 1968.
