= Roy Rolland =

English comedian and stage actor

Roy Rolland as Old Mother Riley

Roy Rolland (29 June 1921 – 16 August 1997) was an English comedian and stage actor who was the understudy for Arthur Lucan as Old Mother Riley and who took over the role following the death of Lucan in 1954, playing it until about 1977.

== Biography ==
Rolland was born in Oldham in Lancashire in 1921; as a teenager he appeared in a number of concert parties and seaside summer shows in the North of England without much success until he met Lucan in about 1950 and who saw his comedic potential.

Rolland acted as Arthur Lucan's understudy and stand-in for Old Mother Riley both on stage and in film (including in Lucan's last film Mother Riley Meets the Vampire, where he stood in for Lucan in the more physical scenes). Towards the end of Lucan's life, as he was affected more and more by alcoholism, Rolland appeared more frequently in the role. Following Lucan's death in 1954, Kitty McShane, his on-stage daughter and real-life ex-wife, hired Rolland to appear with her as Old Mother Riley. After a disagreement with McShane, Rolland renamed the character Old Mother Kelly, but to all intents and purposes the character was the same.

After McShane's death in 1964, Rolland moved to Rhyl where every Christmas he played the pantomime dame at the Gaiety Theatre. Usually he played the dame as Old Mother Riley, but occasionally he appeared as Old Mother Goose. In 1973, he joined the cast of Jess Yates' Junior Showtime as Old Mother Riley. Following this he appeared with Danny La Rue in his Summer Show at the Blackpool Opera House. For this, Rolland and La Rue played Mother Riley and her daughter Kitty in a recreation of the Lucan and McShane sketch "Bridget's Night Out" from the 1930s. Rolland appeared as himself in the television documentary Danny La Rue: The Ladies I Love.

Rolland retired to Rhyl in Denbighshire where he lived with his male partner, a former supermarket manager. Roy Rolland died there in August 1997, aged 76.
