= Charing Cross Road (film) =

1935 British film by Albert de Courville

- Opening title
- Directed by: Albert de Courville
- Written by: Clifford Grey; Con West
- Based on: original radio play Charing Cross Road by Gladys Keyes and Clay Keyes
- Produced by: Herbert Smith
- Starring: John Mills; June Clyde; Derek Oldham.
- Cinematography: Philip Tannura; Harry Rose
- Edited by: Arthur Tavares; Hugh Stewart
- Music by: Percival Mackay
- Production company: British Lion Film Corporation
- Release date: 1935
- Running time: 72 minutes
- Country: United Kingdom
- Language: English

Charing Cross Road is a 1935 British musical romance film directed by Albert de Courville and starring John Mills, June Clyde, Derek Oldham and Belle Baker. It was written by Clifford Grey and Con West, based on the 1934 radio play by Gladys Keyes and Clay Keyes. The film takes its title from the Charing Cross Road that runs through Central London, and its plot concerns the denizens of its theatrical boarding houses.

== Plot ==
Tony and Pam are young performers determined to break into the music-hall comedy scene, and to get married once they both have stable careers. When Tony unexpectedly achieves overnight stardom, he plans to move from his modest lodgings to more lavish accommodation. His landlord, Mac, a veteran of the business who has seen it all, worries that sudden success has gone to Tony's head. He shares the cautionary tale of his old friend, Jimmy O'Donnell, whose arrogance led to his swift downfall from celebrity to the gutter. Moved by this tragic story, Tony takes the lesson to heart and decides to proceed with his show-business career with humility and caution.

== Cast ==
- John Mills as Tony
- June Clyde as Pam
- Derek Oldham as Jimmy O'Connell
- Belle Baker as Belle
- Jean Colin as Cherry
- Arthur Sinclair as Mac
- Garry Marsh as Berry
- C. Denier Warren as salesman
- Coral Browne as Lady Ruston
- Charles Heslop as Langdon
- Alfred Wellesley as producer
- Judy Kelly as Vera

== Reception ==
Kine Weekly wrote: "Musical comedy-drama, an artless blending of all the popular elements, based on the successful radio play. The idea, which looks for its moral in the blending of two distinct stories, is not exploited with a great deal of imagination, but the material fortunately is original enough to withstand haphazard treatment. ... John Mills and June Clyde are quite good as Tony and Pam respectively; they have youth and versatility and keep the entertainment alive by their enthusiasm. Derek Oldham sings well as O'Donnell, although his delineation of character is hardly convincing."

The Daily Film Renter wrote: "Developed with tuneful song numbers, film features attractive stage spectacle involving usual display of chorine comeliness. London's 'Tin Pan Alley' comes in for gentle satire at hands of Denier Warren, while Belle Baker scores hit with characteristic songs. June Clyde makes appealing soubrette effective. Booking of popular calibre."

Picturegoer wrote: "The plot is certainly not novel, being concerned with the stage player who, meeting with success, 'high hats' his old companions; but the whole thing is done with such enthusiasm that it carries the audience along."

Picture Show wrote: "John Mills very good as Tony, and he is splendidly supported by June Clyde. Derek Oldham sings well as Jimmy and Jean Collin is an attractive and clever Cherry, and sings delighfiully. Praise is also due to Belle Baker for her singing and the way she can put songs over. This is a very bright picture, with two particularly good stage scenes."
