= Patrick Ludlow =

British actor (1903–1996)

- 1939 Spotlight photo
- Born: John Patrick Sutton Ludlow; 24 March 1903; Kensington, London, England
- Died: 27 January 1996 (aged 92); London, England
- Occupation: Actor

Patrick Ludlow (March 24, 1903 – January 27, 1996) was a British actor predominantly on stage, with his own touring theatre company from 1943.

== Filmography ==
Year	Title	Role	Notes
1928	The Ware Case	Eustace Ede	
1929	The Third Eye	Arthur Redfern	
1930	Naughty Husbands	Willy	
1932	The Blue Danube	Companion	
1932	Service for Ladies	Minor Role	Uncredited
1932	His Lordship	Hon. Grimsthwaite	
1932	Love on the Spot	Mr. Terrington	
1932	Bachelor's Baby	Clarence	
1932	Watch Beverly	Patrick Nolan	
1933	Bitter Sweet	Henry	
1933	Chelsea Life	Lancelot Humphrey	
1934	Evergreen	Lord Shropshire	
1935	Man of the Moment	Roulette Player	
1936	Jury's Evidence	Cyril	
1936	They Didn't Know	Charles Rockway	
1936	Seven Sinners	Pilgrims of Peace Poet	Uncredited
1936	King of Hearts	Reggie	
1937	Rose of Tralee	Frank	
1937	Old Mother Riley	Edwin Briggs	
1937	Gangway	Carl Freemason	
1939	Goodbye, Mr. Chips		Uncredited
1939	Old Mother Riley, MP	Archie	
1941	The Farmer's Wife	Curate	
1942	We'll Smile Again	BBC Man	Uncredited
1960	Marriage of Convenience	Registrar	
1966	Modesty Blaise	Under Secretary	
