= Harry Tate =

English comedian (1872–1940)

- Born: Ronald Macdonald Hutchison; 4 July 1872; Lambeth, London, England
- Died: 14 February 1940 (aged 67); Northolt, Middlesex, England
- Occupation: Comedian
- Years active: 1890s–1940

Ronald Macdonald Hutchison (4 July 1872 – 14 February 1940), professionally known as Harry Tate, was an English comedian, who performed in the music halls, variety shows and films.

== Career ==
Born in Lambeth, the son of a Scottish tea merchant, he worked as a clerk for the sugar refiners, Henry Tate & Sons, and also performed at evening smoking concerts. At Marie Lloyd's suggestion, he took his stage name from that of the company for which he worked. He made his professional stage debut at the Oxford Music Hall in 1895, and at first was known for his mimicry of performers such as Dan Leno, R. G. Knowles, George Robey, and Eugene Stratton.

Greater success came with his comedy sketch, "Motoring", which he introduced in 1902 and in which he played the part of a new car owner trying to repair it. He soon decided to abandon mimicry and concentrate on sketches, most of which he wrote with Wal Pink. His other sketches included "Running an Office", "Selling a Car", "Billiards", and "Fishing". Tate's sketches "presented him as a blustering – if basically good-humoured – incompetent, convinced that he was in charge of the situation, but never failing to increase the chaos which surrounded him." He toured with a company of six performers, at first including Tom Tweedly and Harry Beasley. He also appeared in West End revues, and appeared in four Royal Variety Performances, in 1912, 1919, 1925, and 1938.

He wore a false moustache, which he could use to express all kinds of emotion by twitching or moving it. Several catch phrases he used became popular in Britain in the twentieth century, including "Good-bye-ee!", which inspired the popular First World War song written by Weston and Lee; "How's your father?", which Tate used as an escape clause when his character was unable to think of an answer to a question; and "I don't think", used as an ironic postscript, as in "He's a nice chap – I don't think".

Historian and writer Roger Wilmut described Tate as "the greatest of all the pre-Second World War sketch comics, and one of the few artists from before 1914 to be able to maintain his popularity in Variety right through the inter-war period". By the 1930s, the costs of touring with a company became too great, and Tate performed sketches with his son, Ronnie (1902–1982).

Tate was a member of the Grand Order of Water Rats charity, serving as "King Rat" in 1911. He was also a keen motorist. The earliest known celebrity personalised number plate was T 8, owned by Tate

In February 1940 Tate suffered a stroke and died, aged 67, shortly after. While in bed after his stroke he told reporters that he had been injured during an air raid, and because they failed to realise that he was joking this is often given as the cause of his death. He is buried at St Mary's, Northolt. For a time, his son Ronnie continued the act as "Harry Tate Jr.".

== Selected filmography ==
- Her First Affaire (1932)
- My Lucky Star (1933)
- Counsel's Opinion (1933)
- Happy (1934)
- I Spy (1934)
- Midshipman Easy (1935)
- Look Up and Laugh (1935)
- Hyde Park Corner (1935)
- Keep Your Seats, Please (1936)
- Soft Lights and Sweet Music (1936)
- Variety Parade (1936)
- Wings of the Morning (1937)
- Take a Chance (1937)

== Slang usage ==
The term "Harry Tate" entered twentieth-century English as a form of cockney rhyming slang, initially meaning "late", because of Tate's comedic routines about automotive troubles. Around mid-1915, "Harry Tate" began to serve as slang for "plate". When the Royal Aircraft Factory R.E.8 biplane was introduced in late 1916 and 1917, the "R.E.8" designation spoken aloud was observed to sound similar to Tate's name, so the fliers nicknamed the aeroplane "Harry Tate". After the war, "Harry Tate" settled into a meaning of "state" in cockney rhyming slang. His name was also used in the nickname of the Royal Naval Patrol Service, Harry Tate's Navy.
