= Con West =

Screenwriter (1891–?)

- Born: 1891
- Died: unknown
- Occupation: Screenwriter
- Years active: 1928–1968

Con West (1891 – ?) was a screenwriter in the British film industry, active in the 1930s and 1940s, specialising in comedy.

== Career ==
=== Film and stage ===
West began as a subtitles writer for Gaumont-British, and his first screenplay was for the short film The Raw Recruit (1928). He wrote films for companies including Gainsborough, British National and Butcher's, stage plays, and revue sketches for the Crazy Gang.

=== Radio ===
In the 1940s West wrote for BBC radio, including series by Will Hay, Ralph Reader and Scott And Whaley.

== Screenwriting credits ==
Sourced from the British Film Institute collections catalogue, except where noted.

- The Raw Recruit (1928)
- Acci-Dental Treatment (1929)
- P.C. Josser (1931)
- Up for the Cup (1931)
- Letting in the Sunshine (1933)
- Josser in the Army (1932)
- The Bad Companions (1932)
- Josser Joins the Navy (1932)
- Kentucky Minstrels (1934)
- Josser on the Farm (1934)
- My Old Duchess (1934)
- Strictly Illegal (1935)
- Jimmy Boy (1935)
- Things Are Looking Up (1935)
- Smith's Wives (1935)
- Birds of a Feather (1936)
- Love Up the Pole (1936)
- Variety Parade (1936)
- One Good Turn (1936)
- Charing Cross Road (1935)
- The Small Man (1936)
- Sunshine Ahead (1936)
- Don't Rush Me (1936)
- Old Mother Riley (1937)
- Why Pick on Me? (1937)
- Miracles Do Happen (1938)
- Old Mother Riley in Paris (1938)
- What Would You Do, Chums? (1939)
- Old Mother Riley M.P. (1939)
- Music Hall Parade (1939)
- Jail Birds (1940)
- Old Mother Riley Joins Up (1940)
- Pack Up Your Troubles (1940)
- Old Mother Riley's Circus (1941)
- Old Mother Riley's Ghosts (1941)
- Old Mother Riley in Business (1941)
- Asking for Trouble (1942)
- Somewhere in Civvies (1943)
- The Dummy Talks (1943)
- Schweik's New Adventures (1943)
- It's in the Bag (1944)
- The Adventures of Jane (1949)
- Old Mother Riley's New Venture (1949)
- Old Mother Riley, Headmistress (1950)
- Up for the Cup (1950)
- Kindly Leave the Stage (TV, 1968)

== Books ==
- Edwin Adeler and Con West, Remember Fred Karno? (John Long Ltd, London, 1939).
