= Rose of Tralee (1937 film) =

- Directed by: Oswald Mitchell
- Screenplay by: Oswald Mitchell
- Story by: Oswald Mitchell; Ian Walker
- Produced by: Norman Hope-Bell
- Starring: Binkie Stuart; Kathleen O'Regan; Fred Conyngham
- Cinematography: Geoffrey Faithfull; Jack Parker
- Distributed by: Butcher's Film Service
- Release date: April 1937
- Running time: 78 minutes
- Country: United Kingdom
- Language: English

Rose of Tralee is a 1937 British musical film directed by Oswald Mitchell and starring Binkie Stuart, Kathleen O'Regan and Fred Conyngham. The screenplay was by Mitchell, from a story by himself and Ian Walker.

== Plot ==
An Irish singer goes to New York City to make his fortune, but loses contact with his wife and family.

== Cast ==
- Binkie Stuart as Rose O'Malley
- Kathleen O'Regan as Mary O'Malley
- Fred Conyngham as Paddy O'Malley
- Danny Malone as singer
- Dorothy Dare as Jean Hale
- Sydney Fairbrother as Mrs. Thompson
- Talbot O'Farrell as Tim Kelly
- C. Denier Warren as Henry Collett
- Patrick Ludlow as Frank
- Scott Harold as Gleeson

== Reception ==
The Monthly Film Bulletin wrote: "This cannot be described as a good picture, but humorous warm-heartedness, backed up by Irish melodies, gives it entertainment value. Singing and sound recording are extremely good and though there are some weak spots in the acting there is strength in the character parts. Binkie Stuart, the four-year-old, acts with a childishness which is itself pleasing, but she is rather an anxious looking little star. Photography is adequate except for close-ups taken from slightly below the mouth level of the unfortunate singer."

Kine Weekly wrote: "Musical melodrama of marital vicissitude, inspired by the evergreen Irish ballad. Binkie Stuart, England's latest child prodigy, is the key-piece in the artless but popular jigsaw of comedy, drama, sentiment and song, and she, considering her tender years, puts over a performance of astonishing versatility. She will draw whinnies of delight from the womenfolk, and this alone should be more than good enough to get the film over in provincial, suburban, industrial and family halls. ... A worthy companion picture to Danny Boy, this film ambles amiably between grime and glamour to the tune of tender Irish melodies. The juvenile element is, of course, the most intriguing, and this, thanks to the cleverness of the child star, brings to the showmanlike alternation of essentials the quality of feminine appeal that will more than atone for the artlessness of the whole."

== See also ==
- "The Rose of Tralee (song)"
- Rose of Tralee (1942 film)
