= Old Mother Riley's Jungle Treasure =

1951 British film by Maclean Rogers

- Directed by: Maclean Rogers
- Screenplay by: Val Valentine
- Produced by: Maclean Rogers
- Starring: Arthur Lucan; Kitty McShane
- Cinematography: James Wilson
- Edited by: Anne Barker
- Music by: Wilfred Burns
- Production company: Oakland Films
- Distributed by: Renown Pictures
- Release date: 1951
- Running time: 75 minutes
- Country: United Kingdom
- Language: English

Old Mother Riley's Jungle Treasure is a low budget 1951 British comedy film directed by Maclean Rogers and starring Arthur Lucan and Kitty McShane. It was written by Val Valentine and was the penultimate film in the long running Old Mother Riley series. It features an early appearance by future Carry On regular Peter Butterworth.

== Plot summary ==
Mother Riley, while working in an antique shop with her daughter Kitty, uncovers a secret treasure map hidden in the headboard of an antique bed.

With the help of the ghost of the pirate Captain Morgan, Mother Riley and Kitty head for a remote tropical island in the South Seas, and begin their hunt for buried treasure. Not only do they find the fortune, but Mother Riley ends up celebrated by natives as their tribe’s queen.

== Cast ==
- Arthur Lucan as Old Mother Riley
- Kitty McShane as Kitty
- Garry Marsh as Jim
- Cyril Chamberlain as Captain Daincourt
- Robert Adams as Chief 'Stinker' Carstairs
- Roddy Hughes as James Orders
- Willer Neal as Harry Benson
- Anita D'ray as Estelle
- Sebastian Cabot as Morgan the pirate
- Bill Shine (actor) as Flying Officer Prang
- Peter Butterworth as Steve
- Peter Swanwick as Mr Benson
- Harry Lane as Slim
- Michael Ripper as Jake
- Maria Mercedes as air hostess
- Gerald Rex as Ted

== Production ==
Husband and wife Arthur Lucan and Kitty McShane had separated by the time of production, and were touring in different "Old Mother Riley" shows. This was Kitty's final Mother Riley film, and her scenes with Lucan were reputedly shot on separate days.

During filming, there was a strike over pay, led by the dancer Josie Woods, who was an extra on the film.

== Critical reception ==
Kine Weekly wrote: "Played for all and more than its worth by Arthur Lucan and a well chosen supporting cast, it's an obvious sitter for Old Mother Riley's legion of fans. Cast-iron British star comedy for the masses and sticks."

Picture Show wrote: "Those who can't resist Old Mother Riley will find her as irresistible as ever in this slapstick comedy, as she leaves her antique shop because of a dream, to brave the terrors of the jungle in search of hidden treasure, ending up as the chief treasure of the local natives!"

TV Guide called the movie a "relentlessly absurd farce... A film in the stylized vein of British comedy (as are all the pictures in the 'Old Mother Riley' series) that continues through the films of Monty Python."

David Parkinson writes in Moviemail.com, "a discreet veil should be drawn over the last third of Jungle Treasure (1951), as its racial stereotyping outdoes anything seen in a Tarzan adventure."
