= Luton Girls Choir =

The Luton Girls Choir was an English vocal ensemble that performed between 1936 and 1977, and made popular radio broadcasts and recordings between the 1940s and 1960s. It was established and directed throughout its existence by Arthur Ernest Davies (1897–1977).

== History ==
Arthur Davies, who was an agricultural agent by trade, and a church choirmaster, formed the choir in Luton, Bedfordshire, in 1936. He was motivated by the desire to revive what he saw as the dying art of choral singing. Initially, the choir performed locally in and around Luton. By the end of the Second World War, they were sufficiently well-known to perform elsewhere within Britain. The girls, who were all aged between 12 and 23, were "expected to conduct themselves at all time as Ambassadors of Luton." They performed in St Paul's Cathedral, at the 80th birthday celebrations of Queen Mary in 1947, and at the opening ceremony of the Olympic Games and the Royal Command Performance in 1948. The choir became such a household name that comedians such as Terry-Thomas made fun of it.

According to a Coronation celebration programme in 1953, the choir received some 800 membership applications each year.

"Limitations were put on membership. The girls must live within five miles of Luton's Town Hall. They resign at 23 or marriage. They pay fourpence a week to be members. Their reward is the friendship of 120 other girls, the guidance of their Musical Director, the knowledge of the joy they give to their audience, and the help they bring to deserving causes. The girls are not professionals. They go to rehearsals twice a week straight from school or from the office desk or factory bench. They return after a Sunday concert, tired but happy, and after a good night's sleep go about their daily tasks as usual at nine o'clock the following morning."

They travelled to Denmark in 1952, and then more widely, including a successful trip to Australia and New Zealand in 1959. The choir also broadcast on BBC radio, and made many recordings.

A charitable trust was established on behalf of the choir, and during its existence it raised over £100,000 for charities. Arthur Davies was awarded the M.B.E. for services to music, and in 1962 was profiled on the TV programme This Is Your Life. He became too ill to remain as musical director in 1976, and after his death the following year it was decided that the choir should not continue. The choir gave its final performance at a tribute concert for Arthur Davies on 5 November 1977.
