= Fred Watts =

English cricketer

Frederick Henry George Watts (1904–1981) was an English cricketer active from 1932 to 1937 who played for Northamptonshire (Northants). He appeared in four first-class matches as a righthanded batsman. Watts was born in Northampton on 29 July 1904 and died there on 5 November 1981. He scored 12 runs with a highest score of 6.
