= Trunk Crime =

- Directed by: Roy Boulting
- Written by: Reginald Denham (play); Edward Percy (play); Francis Miller
- Produced by: John Boulting
- Starring: Manning Whiley; Barbara Everest; Michael Drake
- Cinematography: D.P. Cooper
- Edited by: Clifford Boote; Roy Boulting
- Music by: Charles Brill
- Production company: Charter Film Productions
- Distributed by: Anglo-American Film Corporation
- Release date: 25 September 1939
- Running time: 60 minutes
- Country: United Kingdom
- Language: English

Trunk Crime (also known as Design for Murder) is a 1939 British thriller film directed by Roy Boulting and starring Manning Whiley, Barbara Everest and Michael Drake. It was written by Francis Miller based on the 1937 play The Last Straw by Reginald Denham and Edward Percy.

== Plot ==
Sensitive university student Bentley is bullied by his peers. After a particularly unpleasant attack he snaps and seeks revenge. Drugging the gangleader Grierson, he takes him in a trunk to his country cottage, planning to bury him alive in the marshes. While Bentley is away from the cottage Grierson is discovered and freed. He rues his callous actions towards Bentley.

== Cast ==
- Manning Whiley as Bentley
- Barbara Everest as Ursula
- Michael Drake as Grierson
- Hay Petrie as Old Dan
- Thorley Walters as Huey Frazer
- David Keir as Quiney
- Howard Douglas as the landlord
- Tom Gill as undergraduate
- Lewis Stringer as Hearty, undergraduate
- Ian Fulton as undergraduate
- Geoffrey Gabriel as undergraduate
- Eileen Bennett as Eve
- Pamela Sharpe as Annie
- Charles Stephenson as the porter
- Patch as the dog

== Production ==
It was made at Elstree Studios as a quota quickie. The film's sets were designed by Duncan Sutherland.

== Reception ==
The Monthly Film Bulletin wrote: "It is a convincing and consistent story with a purpose. The settings are appropriate. The photography is often original, and certainly executed with imagination: the unbalanced condition of Bentley's mind being suggested, for instance, by shots taken from below and on a slant. The film is further enhanced by Manning Whiley's dramatic performance as Bentley, and indeed, by the fine acting of the whole cast. From an entertainment point of view it is exciting without being cheaply sensational."

Kine Weekly wrote: "Though inclined to over-act at times, Manning Whiley does very well with an exacting part as Bentley. Barbara Everest's Ursula is a sympathetic and understanding study, and Hay Petrie contributes an amusing little cameo as a local character. ... Story is theatrical in cenception and staging, and there is a great deal of dialogue, but within the limitations imposed on him the director has used his camera intelligently. Psychological aspects of the plot are not over-stressed, while the narrative holds attention by sheer force of its thriller content. :"

Picturegoer wrote: "Morbid thriller which suffers from theatricality and a superfluity of dialogue."
