= Vivienne Chatterton =

British singer and actress (1896–1974)

Vivienne Cynthia Chatterton
- Born: 8 June 1896; Paddington
- Died: 1 January 1974 (aged 77); London
- Occupations: Singer and radio actor
- Years active: 1919-1974

Vivienne Chatterton (8 June 1896 – 1 January 1974) was a British singer and noted radio actress of the 20th century.

== Biography ==
Vivienne Chatterton was born in Paddington, London. Her father was English, her mother French. She was educated at the Royal College of Music, for which she won an open scholarship in 1919.

Her early career was as a singer of lieder, oratorio and opera, with roles in a number of London shows. She opened a long BBC career in 1924, appearing in The Rose of Persia and from the early 1930s she appeared as an actor in radio plays, and schools programmes. She appeared in several films during the 1930s including a lead role in the comedy Love Up the Pole (1936) and supporting roles in Mayfair Melody (1936) and Annie Laurie (1939). She appeared a number of times in singing roles in the first full year of regular BBC Television broadcasting.

She was engaged throughout the Second World War on children's programmes, and in her post-war career she became noted as radio actor, voicing the character of Mrs Mountford in the popular Mrs Dale's Diary, and appearing in several hundred radio plays. She was said to have an 'unusual talent for every type of dialect'.

Chatterton married L. Stanton Jefferies, the BBC's director of music. She died in London on 1 January 1974, aged 77.

== Selected filmography ==
- Squibs (1935)
- Love Up the Pole (1936)
- Mayfair Melody (1936)
- Annie Laurie (1936)
- Dinner at the Ritz (1937)
- Father Steps Out (1937)
- Little Miss Somebody (1937)
- Down Our Alley (1939)

== Bibliography ==
- MacNeice, Louis. Louis MacNeice: The Classical Radio Plays. Oxford University Press, 2013.
