= Manning Whiley =

British actor (1915–1975)

- in Freedom Radio (1941)
- Born: 23 January 1915; Hampstead, London, England
- Died: 29 January 1975 (aged 60)

Manning Hedges Whiley (23 January 1915 – 29 January 1975) was a British actor.

== Partial filmography ==
- Trunk Crime (1939) - Bentley
- The Four Just Men (1939) - (uncredited)
- Pack Up Your Troubles (1940) - Muller
- Contraband (1940) - Manager of 'Mousetrap'
- Pastor Hall (1940) - Vogel
- The Flying Squad (1940) - Ronald Perryman
- Saloon Bar (1940) - Evangelist
- Sailors Three (1940) - German Commdr.
- Freedom Radio (1941) - S.S. Trooper
- Gasbags (1941) - O.P. Colonel
- The Ghost of St. Michael's (1941) - Stock
- Old Bill and Son (1941) - Chimp
- The Saint's Vacation (1941) - Marko
- "Pimpernel" Smith (1941) - Bertie Gregson
- The Big Blockade (1942) - Naval officer (uncredited)
- Penn of Pennsylvania (1942) - (uncredited)
- This Was Paris (1942) - French Officer (uncredited)
- The Dummy Talks (1943) - Russell Warren
- Bell-Bottom George (1944) - Church
- Meet Sexton Blake! (1945) - Raoul Sudd
- For You Alone (1945) - Max Borrow
- The Seventh Veil (1945) - Dr. Irving
- Teheran (1946) - Paul Sherek
- Code of Scotland Yard (1947) - Corder Morris
- Uncle Silas (1947) - Dudley Ruthyn
- Children of Chance (1949) - Don Andrea
- Little Big Shot (1952) - Mike Connor (final film role)
