= Down Our Alley =

1939 British film by George A. Cooper

- Directed by: George A. Cooper
- Produced by: Germain Burger
- Starring: Hughie Green; Wally Patch; Vivienne Chatterton
- Cinematography: Germain Burger
- Production company: British Screen Service
- Distributed by: British Screen Service
- Release date: July 1939
- Running time: 56 minutes
- Country: United Kingdom
- Language: English

Down Our Alley is a 1939 British musical film directed by George A. Cooper and starring Hughie Green, Wally Patch and Vivienne Chatterton. It was made at Highbury Studios as a quota quickie.

== Main cast ==
- Hughie Green as Hughie Dunstable
- Wally Patch as Mr. Dunstable
- Vivienne Chatterton as Mrs. Dunstable
- Sylvia Saetre as Sally
- Anthony Holles as Tony
- Daphne Raglan as Mary
- Philip Morant as Eustace
- Johnnie Schofield as Waiter

== Reception ==
The Monthly Film Bulletin wrote: "The acting of the majority is overdone and the imitations of Joe E. Brown, which a slight resemblance calls forth, are very forced. The exceptions are Hughie Green, whose acting stands out as very good, and Wally Patch, who is his usual downright self."

In British Sound Films: The Studio Years 1928–1959 David Quinlan rated the film as "mediocre", writing: "Strenuous musical farce."
