= Arthur Lucan =

English actor (1885–1954)

- Lucan in the 1930's.
- Born: 16 September 1885
- Died: 17 May 1954 (aged 68)
- Occupation: Actor
- Writing career
- Notable work: Old Mother Riley

Arthur Lucan (born Arthur Towle; 16 September 1885 – 17 May 1954) was an English actor who performed as Old Mother Riley on stage, screen, and radio, including a series of comedy films from the 1930s into the 1950s.

== Early life ==
Lucan was born on 16 September 1885 in Sibsey, Lincolnshire, as Arthur Towle, the third of seven children born to Tom Towle, a groom, and his wife, Lucy Ann Mawer. When he was five years old, the family moved to nearby Boston, Lincolnshire, where Arthur later made his first acting appearance at the town's Shodfriars Hall. After leaving school, he left home to pursue a career in music hall. He gained a job with a family troupe called the Musical Cliftons, and later as sidekick to a comedian called Will Pepper.

== Career and marriage ==
Arthur Lucan and Kitty McShane as Old Mother Riley and her daughter 'Kitty'.

Lucan was appearing in Dublin when he met and married 16-year-old Kitty McShane in 1913. The couple had a son, Donald Daniel Towle (2 October 1915, Dublin – 10 February 1975, Par, Cornwall). They became a successful double act, achieving some success with a sketch called "Bridget's Night Out" in which Lucan worked in drag for the first time, and began to develop the character of Old Mother Riley. Whilst in Dublin, he changed his name to Lucan, and they performed as 'Lucan and McShane'. The act was featured in the 1934 Royal Command Performance at the London Palladium.

After the Royal Command Performance, there followed a film career, a radio series, and even a strip cartoon in the Radio Times and Film Fun. In all, Lucan made 17 films as Old Mother Riley. In 1943, the Motion Picture Herald voted him the sixth biggest "money-making star" in British films. However, the marriage proved a volatile union, and Lucan and McShane separated in 1951.

== Death ==
Lucan, as 'Old Mother Riley' was last seen on stage at the Theatre Royal, Barnsley on 14 May 1954 in a stage adaptation of Old Mother Riley in Paris as part of his national theatre and music hall tour. Lucan died, aged 68, at the Tivoli Theatre, Hull on Monday, 17 May 1954. Ellis Aston was the first on stage to compere the forthcoming show. But Lucan had collapsed in the wings and died shortly afterwards in his dressing room. He is buried in Hull's Eastern Cemetery.

== Legacy ==
The site of his death now houses a bakery and cafe, where there is a memorial bust of Arthur Lucan, together with various memorabilia from his career.

Following his death, Lucan's understudy Roy Rolland took on the role of Old Mother Riley, performing with Kitty McShane until her death in 1964, before then performing solo in cabaret, pantomime, theatre variety shows and summer seasons, until the 1980s when he retired.

In 1982, Alan Plater wrote a play, On Your Way, Riley, about the life of Arthur Lucan, with songs by Alex Glasgow. This was also broadcast on ITV in 1985 with Brian Murphy and Maureen Lipman in the leading roles.

A Greater London Council blue plaque, unveiled in 1978, commemorates Lucan at his home, 11 Forty Lane in Wembley.

Lucan was a member of the Savage Club. In recent years, the club has held Old Mother Riley evenings, as a tribute to Lucan's talent.

There is a comedic line of descent from Old Mother Riley to Mrs. Brown's Boys: "She was a larger than life character who's noisy, over the top, always getting into scrapes." Berwick Kaler's Dame in the York Theatre Royal pantomime has also been likened to Old Mother Riley.

== Filmography ==
Actor (and writer where stated)

- Stars on Parade (1936)
- Old Mother Riley (1937)
- Kathleen Mavourneen (1937)
- Old Mother Riley in Paris (1938)
- Old Mother Riley, MP (1940)
- Old Mother Riley Joins Up (1940)
- Old Mother Riley in Society (1940)
- Old Mother Riley's Circus (and writer, 1941)
- Old Mother Riley in Business (1941)
- Old Mother Riley's Ghosts (and writer, 1941)
- Old Mother Riley Overseas (and writer, 1943)
- Old Mother Riley Detective (and writer, 1943)
- Old Mother Riley at Home (1945)
- Old Mother Riley's New Venture (1949)
- Old Mother Riley Headmistress (1950)
- Old Mother Riley's Jungle Treasure (1951)
- Mother Riley Meets the Vampire (1952)
