= Three Men in a Boat (1920 film) =

1920 film

- Directed by: Challis Sanderson
- Release date: 1920
- Country: United Kingdom

Three Men in a Boat is a 1920 British silent comedy film directed by Challis Sanderson and starring Lionelle Howard, Manning Haynes and Johnny Butt. It is an adaptation of the 1889 novel Three Men in a Boat by Jerome K. Jerome. The screenplay concerns three friends who go on a boating holiday.

== Premise ==
Three friends enjoy a series of comic adventures when they go for a boating holiday on the River Thames.

== Cast ==
- Lionelle Howard as J.
- Manning Haynes as Harris
- Johnny Butt as George
- Eva Westlake
- Edward C. Bright
- Florence Turner
