= Old Mother Riley Joins Up =

1940 British film by Maclean Rogers

- Directed by: Maclean Rogers
- Written by: Kathleen Butler; Maisie Sharman; Con West
- Story by: Jack Marks
- Produced by: John Corfield
- Starring: Arthur Lucan; Kitty McShane; Martita Hunt
- Cinematography: James Wilson
- Edited by: James Corbett
- Music by: Ronnie Munro
- Production company: British National Films
- Distributed by: Anglo-American Film Corporation
- Release date: 24 February 1940 (UK)
- Running time: 75 minutes
- Country: United Kingdom
- Language: English

Old Mother Riley Joins Up is a 1940 British comedy film directed by Maclean Rogers and starring Arthur Lucan, Kitty McShane, Martita Hunt, Bruce Seton and Garry Marsh. It was written by Kathleen Butler, Maisie Sharman and Con West.

== Plot summary ==
Old Mother Riley works as a nurse before volunteering for the Auxiliary Territorial Service. With the help of her daughter Kitty and Kitty's boyfriend Lieutenant Travers, she thwarts a plan by enemy agents to steal important secret documents.

== Cast ==
- Arthur Lucan as Mrs Riley
- Kitty McShane as Kitty Riley
- Glen Alyn as Pauline
- Dorothy Dewhurst as Mrs Rayful
- Martita Hunt as Commandant
- H. F. Maltby as Gen. Hogsley
- Garry Marsh as Dr. Leach
- Bryan Powley as Mr Rayful
- Bruce Seton as Lt. Travers
- Jeanne Stuart as Nurse Wilson

== Production ==
It was the first Old Mother Riley movie made for British National. Filming took place in August 1939.

== Critical reception ==
Kine Weekly wrote: "The humour never aspires to subtlety; rather has it a welcome and wholesome vulgarity. Grand pantomime by Arthur Lucan and ambitious atmosphere of a box-office topicality are, in fact, its strong suits. Eager and versatile supporting teamwork cannot, however, be ignored. In a word, the show is a robust, ribald romp, just the stuff to give the troops. Cast-iron star comedy bet for the masses."

The Daily Film Renter wrote: "Full of slapstick, with slender romance, entire footage is dominated by Arthur Lucas's popular characterisation. Goes straight for its fun in customary style, with plenty of 'custard-pie ' action, and makes hearty laughter for the army of 'Mother Riley' fans. There is no subtlety about 'Old Mother Riley,' but the series of farces featuring this popular dame have a big market, and the latest episode is shrewdly put together to give the customers just what they want. Its humour is broad; and its incident hearty, and Arthur Lucan invests the character with so much energy that the pace never flags."

TV Guide called the film, "a tolerable romp that kept patriotic English fires burning during the early part of WW II."
