= Cock o' the North (film) =

1935 film by Oswald Mitchell and Challis Sanderson

- Trade advertisement
- Directed by: Oswald Mitchell; Challis Sanderson
- Written by: Oswald Mitchell
- Produced by: Oswald Mitchell
- Starring: George Carney; Marie Lohr; Eve Lister
- Cinematography: Desmond Dickinson; Gerald Gibbs; William Luff
- Edited by: Challis Sanderson
- Music by: Horace Sheldon
- Production company: Panther Films
- Distributed by: Butcher's Film Service
- Release date: 6 January 1935
- Running time: 84 minutes
- Country: United Kingdom
- Language: English

Cock o' the North is a 1935 British comedy drama film directed by Oswald Mitchell and Challis Sanderson and starring George Carney, Marie Lohr and Eve Lister. It was written by Mitchell and shot at the Cricklewood Studios in London for release by Butcher's Film Service. Like many of Butcher's films during the decade, it shares its name with a traditional piece of music. In this case the title refers to the railway engine Cock o' the North.

== Preservation status ==
The British Film Institute National Archive holds a collection of ephemera and stills but no film or video materials.

== Synopsis ==
George Barton, an engine driver, is injured in a motor accident and is forced to retire. He finds consolation in his wife Mary and son Danny. Meanwhile, his colleagues put on a variety show as a benefit concert for him.

== Cast ==
- George Carney as George Barton
- Marie Lohr as Mary Barton
- Ronnie Hepworth as Danny Barton
- Horace Kenney as Alf Coggins
- Frederick Peisley as Fred Coggins
- Eve Lister as Edna Barton
- Peggy Novak as Maggie Harris
- Johnnie Schofield as Bert Harris
- Roddy Hughes as Taffy
- Terry Conlin as Superintendent
- Stanley Kirby as Guide
- Herbert Cameronas Foreman Brown
- Pearl Hay as Peggy Harris
- Robert Chisholm as self
- Leslie 'Hutch' Hutchinson as self
- Simone Rogers as self
- Naughton and Gold as themselves

== Reception ==
The Monthly Film Bulletin wrote: "Working-class comedy with an admixture of Variety. ... The variety artists (including ' Hutch,' Naughton and Gold, and Robert Chisholm) are introduced into the film by making the railwaymen give a charity concert and by installing the engine-driver's daughter as waitress in a night club. The plot is not worth mentioning. George Carney's cockney engine-driver and Roddy Hughes as the Welsh guard, are delightful. Marie Lohr drops her h's and g's with an effort. Horace Kenney, as usual, is amusing. Robert Chisholm's dramatic French song comes over with great effect. There is a fair amount of good material in the film, but the scenario is entirely haphazard. The hundreds of feet of the express train in motion should prove enjoyable to many small boys."

Kine Weekly wrote: "Simple emotional drama with a plot centering around the railway and family life of an engine driver. There is not much of a story, but what there is has sincerity and conviction on its side. The domestic sequences are very human, and the atmosphere and types are excellent, and these healthy attributes help considerably to compensate for the thematic shortcomings. Room also is found for popular musical interludes, furnished by well-known radio and music-hall stars. In its unpretentious, pleasantly haphazard way, the picture is refreshingly entertaining."

Picture Show wrote: "The film, it Is true, derives its title from the railway engine which Georg Barton is given the honour of driving, but the railway really has very little to do with it."
