= Melody of My Heart =

- Directed by: Wilfred Noy
- Written by: Brandon Fleming
- Produced by: Brandon Fleming; Ronald Kinnoch
- Starring: Derek Oldham; Lorraine La Fosse; Bruce Seton
- Music by: Horace Sheldon
- Production company: Incorporated Talking Films
- Distributed by: Butcher's Film Service
- Release date: April 1936
- Running time: 82 minutes
- Country: United Kingdom
- Language: English

Melody of My Heart is a 1936 British musical film directed by Wilfred Noy and starring Derek Oldham, Lorraine La Fosse and Bruce Seton. It was made at Beaconsfield Studios.

== Partial cast ==
- Derek Oldham as Joe Montfort
- Lorraine La Fosse as Carmel
- Bruce Seton as Jim Brent
- Hughes Macklin as Mr. Smith
- Dorothy Vernon as Mrs. Dearwell
- MacArthur Gordon as Manager
- Colin Cunningham as Ramenado
- Joe Velitch as Pastias
- Joyce St. Clair as Mercedes

== Bibliography ==
- Low, Rachael. Filmmaking in 1930s Britain. George Allen & Unwin, 1985.
- Wood, Linda. British Films, 1927-1939. British Film Institute, 1986.
