= Love Up the Pole =

- Ernie Lotinga (left) in the film
- Directed by: Clifford Gulliver
- Written by: Herbert Sargent; Con West; Oswald Mitchell; Ernie Lotinga
- Produced by: Norman Hope-Bell; Oswald Mitchell
- Starring: Ernie Lotinga; Vivienne Chatterton; Wallace Lupino; Davina Craig
- Cinematography: Jack Parker
- Edited by: Challis Sanderson
- Production company: British Comedies
- Distributed by: Butcher's Film Service
- Release date: September 1936
- Running time: 82 minutes
- Country: United Kingdom
- Language: English

Love Up the Pole is a 1936 British comedy film directed by Clifford Gulliver and starring Ernie Lotinga, Vivienne Chatterton and Wallace Lupino. It was written by Herbert Sargent, Con West, Oswald Mitchell and Lotinga, made at the Cricklewood Studios in London, and distributed by Butcher's Film Service.

== Preservation status ==
The British Film Institute National Archive holds no stills or ephemera, and no film or video materials.

== Plot ==
Jimmy Josser and his friend Spud Walker are waiters at a roadhouse when a pair of thieves, Ramolini and his accomplice, steal a pearl necklace belonging to the owner, Mrs. Berwick. Ramolini hides the stolen pearls in Spud's coat, which he later pawns. On discovering there is a £5,000 reward for the missing jewellery, Josser convinces Spud to confess to the theft so they can split the reward money. But the scheme backfires when the pawnbroker's testimony lands Spud a fifteen-year prison sentence. Undeterred, Josser tries to get Spud out of prison. After a failed first attempt, smuggling himself inside as a workman, he helps Spud escape by masquerading as the new prison governor.

The pair then join Mrs. Berwick and her party on a cruise ship, where Josser poses as the ship's doctor, leading to predictable embarrassment. The two crooks are also among the passengers and attempt another robbery of the pearls, only to be thwarted by Josser. They later visit a desert sheikh, and Mrs. Berwick is held hostage by Ramolini and his accomplice. In a final showdown, Josser and Spud manage to outwit the villains, bringing the chaotic adventure to a successful conclusion.

== Cast ==
- Ernie Lotinga as Jimmy Josser
- Vivienne Chatterton as Mrs. Berwick
- Wallace Lupino as Major Toulonge
- Jack Frost as Spud Walker
- Davina Craig as Annie Noakes
- Lorna Hubbard as Joan
- Harold Wilkinson as Ramolini
- Fred Schwartz as Mosenstein
- Phyllis Dixey as patient
- John Kevan as Jack

== Reception ==
The Monthly Film Bulletin wrote: "Lotinga appears in every scene and no one else has much to do. The only function of the director seems to have been to keep the way clear for Lotinga and then to allow him as much scope and footage as he wanted. In consequence the film may seem too long and too casual even for Lotinga fans."

The Daily Film Renter wrote: "Lotinga is the whole show, and the comedian enters into the spirit of the thing with customary zest ... The humour, which is mainly of the broad and music-hall variety, feeds on some familiar puns, but is put over with plenty of assurance and will certainly draw the laughs."
