= Song of the Forge =

- Feature on the film from Picture Show (16 October 1937)
- Directed by: Henry Edwards
- Written by: J.D. Lewin; H. Fowler Mear
- Produced by: Norman Hope-Bell; Wilfred Noy
- Starring: Stanley Holloway; Lawrence Grossmith; Davy Burnaby
- Cinematography: Desmond Dickinson
- Edited by: Challis Sanderson
- Music by: Horace Sheldon
- Production company: Butcher's Film Service
- Distributed by: Butcher's Film Service
- Release date: 1 May 1937
- Running time: 82 minutes
- Country: United Kingdom
- Language: English

Song of the Forge (also known as The Village Blacksmith and Blacksmith) is a 1937 British musical film directed by Henry Edwards and starring Stanley Holloway, Lawrence Grossmith and Eleanor Fayre. It was written by J.D. Lewin and H. Fowler Mear, and made at Cricklewood Studios by Butcher's Film Service. The screenplay concerns an elderly blacksmith who refuses assistance from his wealthy son in spite of his own poverty.

== Preservation status ==
The British Film Institute National Archive holds a collection of ephemera and stills but no film or video materials.

== Plot ==
In the early 1900s, blacksmith Joe Barrett is a prominent citizen of the village of Tamerton. Barrett's son Bill refuses to follow his father's business, wishing to pursue a career as engineer, and the two part on bad terms. Years later Bill, now Sir William, has become a famous car tycoon, but an elderly Joe is out of work. Bill tries to reconcile with his father, but is rejected. When he later hears that his father, now destitute, is about to enter the workhouse, he anonymously donates a modern almhouse to the village, for his father's comfort. Eventually, Bill attends a Christmas fair at the village, and is finally able to make peace with Joe.

== Cast ==
- Stanley Holloway as Joe Barrett / Sir William Barrett
- Lawrence Grossmith as Den Dalton
- Eleanor Fayre as Sylvia Brent
- Davy Burnaby as auctioneer
- C. Denier Warren as Farmer George
- Arthur Chesney as Huckleberry
- Aubrey Fitzgerald as oldest inhabitant
- Hal Walters as Sam Tucker
- Charles Hayes as Mayor
- Ian Wilson as Albert Meek
- Hay Plumb as assistant
- Bruce Gordon as Ted Salter

== Reception ==
The Monthly Film Bulletin wrote: "The conflict between father and son is poignant, and Stanley Holloway gives an outstandingly good performance in both parts, lending the old man great dignity... The singing is good, both in the choruses and in the solos, and here again Stanley Holloway effects an amazing change of voice from that of a young man to that of an old one. The supporting cast is good – the various village types being well chosen and handled. A pleasantly sentimental and moving film which is well made."

Kine Weekly wrote: "Musical drama, embracing popular sentiment, song and romance. The mixture, apparently the monopoly of Butcher's, is as before, but the presentation is on a slightly wider scale – its simple story covers three decades – and it is the clever use of cavalcade treatment that will encourage the not too sophisticated, willingly to bear with its artless entertainment yet again. Although familiar, it is friendly, homely and capable of reviving pleasant memories. Stanley Holloway is the star, he is box office and, what is more, his versatility fully entitles him to the honour."
