= C. Denier Warren =

American actor (1889–1971)

- Born: Charles Denier Warren; July 29, 1889; Chicago, Illinois, US
- Died: August 27, 1971 (aged 82); Torquay, Devon, England
- Occupations: Stage, film, television actor

Charles Denier Warren (29 July 1889 – 27 August 1971) was an Anglo-American actor who appeared extensively on stage and screen from the early 1930s to late 1960s, mostly in Great Britain.

== Life ==
He was born in Chicago the son of Charles Warren and his wife Marguerite Fish. The family moved to England when he was eight.

He is also credited as the writer of Take Off That Hat (1938 screenplay), She Shall Have Music (1935) and the BBC radio show Kentucky Minstrels (1934).

In July 1932 Harry S. Pepper, Stanley Holloway, Joe Morley, Doris Arnold, Jane Carr and Warren revived the White Coons Concert Party show of the Edwardian era for BBC Radio.

He died in Torquay in south west England on 27 August 1971.

== Selected filmography ==
- Let Me Explain, Dear (1932) - Jeweller
- Counsel's Opinion (1933) - Manager
- Prince of Arcadia (1933) - Detective
- Channel Crossing (1933) - Purser (uncredited)
- Two Hearts in Waltz Time (1934) - Meyer
- Music Hall (1934) - Bendini
- I Spy (1934) - Alphonse
- The Great Defender (1934) - Mr.Pryor (uncredited)
- Road House (1934) - Music Hall M C (uncredited)
- Radio Parade of 1935 (1934) - Personal Assistant to Carl Graham
- Temptation (1934) - Director
- Kentucky Minstrels (1934) - Danny Goldman
- A Real Bloke (1935) - Tailor
- Royal Cavalcade (1935) - Smith
- Heat Wave (1935) - Col. D'Alvarez
- Be Careful, Mr. Smith (1935)
- The Clairvoyant (1935) - Bimeter
- Heart's Desire (1935) - Ted Mayer
- The Guv'nor (1935) - Manager (uncredited)
- A Fire Has Been Arranged (1935) - Shuffle
- Birds of a Feather (1935) - Taylor
- Marry the Girl (1935) - Banks
- Charing Cross Road (1935) - Salesman
- The Small Man (1936) - Manager
- They Didn't Know (1936) - Padre
- A Star Fell from Heaven (1936) - Starfel
- The Beloved Vagabond (1936) - Railway Clerk
- It's in the Bag (1936) - Emery
- Everybody Dance (1936) - Dan Fleming
- Spy of Napoleon (1936) - Benicolet
- You Must Get Married (1936) - Mr. Wurtsell
- The Big Noise (1936) - Manager
- Cafe Colette (1937) - Compere
- Good Morning, Boys (1937) - Minister of Education
- Rose of Tralee (1937) - Henry Collett
- Song of the Forge (1937) - Farmer George
- Cotton Queen (1937) - Joseph Cotter
- Keep Fit (1937) - Editor
- Change for a Sovereign (1937) - Mr. Heller
- Who Killed John Savage? (1937) - Scruggs
- Captain's Orders (1937) - Lawson
- Melody and Romance (1937) - Captain Hawkins
- Liebling der Matrosen (1937)
- Little Miss Somebody (1937) - Jonas
- A Romance in Flanders (1937) - Bill Johnson
- The Divorce of Lady X (1938) - Royal Park Hotel Clerk (uncredited)
- Second Best Bed (1938) - Umpire (uncredited)
- Kicking the Moon Around (1938) - Mark Browd
- Break the News (1938) - Sir Edward Phring
- Strange Boarders (1938) - Fry
- Old Mother Riley in Paris (1938) - Commissaire of Police
- It's in the Air (1938) - Sir Philip
- Little Miss Molly (1938) - Chuck
- Take Off That Hat (1938) - Ginsberg
- Make It Three (1938) - Mr. Cackleberry
- Me and My Pal (1939)
- Trouble Brewing (1939) - Maj. Hopkins
- A Gentleman's Gentleman (1939) - Dr. Bottom
- Come On George! (1939) - Banker
- The Body Vanished (1939) - Pip Piper
- We'll Smile Again (1942) - Waiter
- The Shipbuilders (1943)
- The Hundred Pound Window (1944) - Blodgett
- Candles at Nine (1944) - Middleton - Executor
- Kiss the Bride Goodbye (1945) - Reporter
- Twilight Hour (1945) - Photographer (uncredited)
- Don Chicago (1945)
- Old Mother Riley's New Venture (1949) - Hillick
- Night and the City (1950) - Small American from Chicago (uncredited)
- Old Mother Riley Headmistress (1950) - Clifton Hill
- The Dragon of Pendragon Castle (1953) - Fred Morgan
- Alf's Baby (1953) - Cedric Donkin
- House of Blackmail (1953) - Jock
- Is Your Honeymoon Really Necessary? (1953) - Photographer
- The Gay Dog (1954) - Man In Vets Waiting Room (uncredited)
- No Smoking (1955) - American Delegate
- Handcuffs, London (1955) - Robert Meekers
- Bluebeard's Ten Honeymoons (1960) - Neighbor (uncredited)
- Escort for Hire (1960) - Porter
- So Evil, So Young (1961) - Sam
- Return of a Stranger (1961) - Manager
- A Taste of Honey (1961) - Tyler
- The Treasure of Monte Cristo (1961) - Cafe owner
- Two Wives at One Wedding (1961) - Fat man
- The Silent Invasion (1962) - Gillie
- Lolita (1962) - Potts
- The Cool Mikado (1963) - Mr. Smith
- The Adding Machine (1969) - Jury foreman (final film role)

== Selected Stage Roles ==
- The First Kiss (1924) as Ali-Mon, Chief Magistrate of Seville, at the New Oxford Theatre, London
- The Music Man (1961) as Mayor George Shinn, UK premiere at the Adelphi Theatre, London
