= Old Mother Riley's Ghosts =

- Directed by: John Baxter
- Written by: Geoffrey Orme; Con West; Arthur Lucan
- Produced by: John Baxter
- Starring: Arthur Lucan; Kitty McShane; John Stuart
- Cinematography: James Wilson
- Edited by: Jack Harris
- Music by: Kennedy Russell
- Production company: British National Films
- Distributed by: Anglo-American Film Corporation
- Release date: 9 June 1941 (UK)
- Running time: 82 minutes
- Country: United Kingdom
- Language: English

Old Mother Riley's Ghosts is a 1941 British comedy film directed by John Baxter and starring Arthur Lucan, Kitty McShane and John Stuart. It was written by Geoffrey Orme, Con West and Lucan, and was the 8th in the long-running Old Mother Riley series. Old Mother Riley inherits a castle in Scotland, but it appears to be haunted.

== Plot summary ==
Old Mother Riley inherits a Scottish property, believing it, at first, to be a pub, and makes the journey up north with her daughter, Kitty. They are surprised to find themselves in possession of a haunted castle, though it turns out the ghouls and ghosties are not what they seem. They are in fact an ingenious front for an espionage ring anxious to get their hands on an inventor's plans, and trying to scare intruders away. After vigorous attempts to scare Mother Riley out of her wits, the Irish washerwoman ends up turning the tables on the spies, and terrifying them in return.

== Cast ==
- Arthur Lucan as Mrs Riley
- Kitty McShane as Kitty Riley
- John Stuart as John Cartwright
- A. Bromley Davenport as Warrender
- Dennis Wyndham as Jem
- John Laurie as McAdam
- Peter Gawthorne as Mr Cartwright

== Production ==
In production the film was known as Mother Riley Cleans Up. Filming finished in January 1941.

== Critical reception ==
Kinematograph Weekly called it "a broad, hearty comedy."

Picturegoer wrote: "The humour is crude but hearty and Lucan displays considerable virtuosity as Mother Riley."

TV Guide wrote, "Sure to garner a couple of hearty laughs ... Some fun 'scares' (a knight whose head flies off) help pass the time."
