= Old Mother Riley in Paris =

- Directed by: Oswald Mitchell
- Written by: Con West
- Produced by: Oswald Mitchell
- Starring: Arthur Lucan; Kitty McShane; Jerry Verno
- Cinematography: Geoffrey Faithfull
- Edited by: Cecil H. Williamson
- Music by: Percival Mackey
- Production company: Butcher's Film Service
- Distributed by: Butcher's Film Service
- Release date: 1938
- Running time: 76 minutes
- Country: United Kingdom
- Language: English
- Budget: £12,279

Old Mother Riley in Paris (also known as Old Mother Riley Catches a Quisling) is a 1938 British comedy film directed by Oswald Mitchell and starring Arthur Lucan, Kitty McShane, Magda Kun and C. Denier Warren. It was written by Con West and is the second in the Old Mother Riley series of films. It was re-released in 1943 as Old Mother Riley Catches a Quisling.

== Synopsis ==
Old Mother Riley is sacked from her job as a step cleaner at the office where her daughter Kitty works. She goes home to make steak and kidney pudding for their lodger, Joe – who is engaged to Kitty – who distractedly pours castor oil into the gravy, with amusing results. Joe is not sure he wants to be tied down to Kitty (or her impossible mother) and arranges for his travel agency employers to post him to Paris for six months, much to Kitty's discomfiture.

While changing a light bulb, Old Mother Riley falls from a stepladder, resulting in her hospitalization. Keen to claim the maximum amount on her insurance, she alters her medical records for the worse – only to be carried off for an emergency operation, when the doctors see how much appears to be "wrong" with her. However, the ruse works: just as bailiffs are arriving to remove all Old Mother Riley's furniture, her insurance agent arrives with £250 in cash, which she uses to pay off her rental arrears. She then treats Kitty and herself to an air flight to Paris, in order to check up on Joe, who has meanwhile become involved with a suspicious young Parisian lady (really a spy with code name "Madame Zero", who believes he is an English agent).

Old Mother Riley, terrified by the air flight, parachutes out of the plane and, on landing, is taken to a Paris police station, where the Commissioner locks her up as the suspected spy "Madame Zero". She escapes and joins Kitty in their luxurious Paris hotel, where they cause chaos (and a custard pie fight) in the restaurant, by mistakenly ordering a trolley full of trifles.

Checking up on Joe, they find him dancing in a café with "Madame Zero". Kitty is heartbroken, and Old Mother Riley drags the Parisian woman to the police station, demanding the woman should be locked up for alienating Joe's affections. When it emerges that the woman is in fact the mysterious "Madame Zero", Old Mother Riley is awarded a medal by the French authorities. She and Kitty return to England by boat and are joined by the repentant Joe, who is finally welcomed into the household by Old Mother Riley. She toasts the couple with champagne which she smuggled through customs.

== Cast ==
- Arthur Lucan as Mrs Riley
- Kitty McShane as Kitty Riley
- Jerry Verno as Joe
- Magda Kun as Madame Zero
- C. Denier Warren as Commissioner
- Stanley Vilven as hotel manager
- Douglas Stewart as Randall, Chairman of shipping company
- George Wolkowsky as apache
- Richard Riviere as French officer

== Critical reception ==
Kine Weekly wrote: "Hearty slapstick comedy, an appropriate addition to what should prove a popular Old Mother Riley cycle. There is of course, no subtlety about the entertainment, but such is its exuberant retainment of diehard music-hall humour that it stands a first-rate chance of going over big with industrial and provincial audiences. The cast is tireless, and the of work well up to standard."

The Monthly Film Bulletin wrote: "Lively low comedy – a remarkably successful attempt to put on the screen the variety partners Lucan and McShane. ... The unending stream of absurdities, both of word and of action, that are poured forth by Arthur Lucan as the comic Irish charwoman are of course the mainstay of the film, but much credit must go to the scenarist (Con West) for creating a story which maintains a ceaseless flow of nonsense and horseplay, and to the director, Oswald Mitchell, for the excellent casting of the minor parts, for the good timing of the action and for the good placing of the actors on th screen."

TV Guide called it, "one of the most far fetched and yet most entertaining of the OLD MOTHER RILEY series... Daring deeds and Lucan's sharp characterization make for an irresistible romp."

DVD Times wrote that the film has "too much reliance on Kitty and no great set pieces (instead we get a series on individual gags which never build to anything)."

Sky Movies commented that it is "probably the funniest of all the Mother Riley comedies, this set up the long-running series, after a rather moderate opener, 'Old Mother Riley, had appeared the previous year... Made in the days when Lucan's real-life wife Kitty McShane still looked young enough to play his daughter."
