= Pack Up Your Troubles (1940 film) =

- Lobby card
- Directed by: Oswald Mitchell
- Written by: Milton Hayward; Reginald Purdell; Con West
- Produced by: F.W. Baker
- Starring: Reginald Purdell; Wylie Watson; Patricia Roc
- Cinematography: Geoffrey Faithfull
- Music by: Percival Mackey
- Production company: Butcher's Film Service
- Distributed by: Butcher's Film Service (UK)
- Release date: February 1940 (UK)
- Running time: 75 minutes
- Country: United Kingdom
- Language: English

Pack Up Your Troubles is a 1940 British second feature ('B') comedy film directed by Oswald Mitchell and starring Reginald Purdell, Wylie Watson and Patricia Roc. It was written by Milton Hayward, Reginald Purdell and Con West.

It takes its name from the First World War marching song "Pack Up Your Troubles in Your Old Kit-Bag".

== Plot ==
Garage owner Tommy and ventriloquist friend Eric join the army and travel to France, where they are captured by the Nazis. However, Eric's voice-throwing skills come in handy in engineering their escape and in obtaining top secret information.

== Cast ==
- Reginald Purdell as Tommy Perkins
- Wylie Watson as Eric Sampson
- Patricia Roc as Sally Brown
- Wally Patch as Sgt. Barker
- Muriel George as Mrs. Perkins
- Ernest Butcher as Jack Perkins
- Manning Whiley as Muller
- G. H. Mulcaster as Col. Diehard

== Box office ==
According to Kinematograph Weekly the film "held its own" at the British box office in August 1940.

== Critical reception ==
The Monthly Film Bulletin wrote: "The title expresses the whole spirit of this film, which is cheerful, light-hearted nonsense. The somewhat ordinary story is redeemed by excellent acting and the two principals, Reginald Purdell and Wylie Watson, are extremely funny."

Picturegoer wrote: "It is ingenuous stuff, with a mixture of song, sentiment and patriotic conviction. Reginald Purdell and Wylie Watson are quite good as the pals and Patricia Roc makes a pretty heroine. Wally Patch is on his best form as the inevitable bullying sergeant. As burlesque German officers, Meinhart Maur and Manning Whiley are good."

TV Guide called it a "Lightweight comedy worth watching for Purdell's and Watson's nice comic performances."

Sky Cinema wrote, "Not the Laurel and Hardy comedy of the same name but a British romp from the war years, which gave character kings Wylie Watson (best-known for his 'Mr Memory' in Hitchcock's The 39 Steps) and Reginald Purdell a rare chance to blossom into leading roles. They're pretty funny together, too. The story's routine, but the leading lady is a very young and pretty Patricia Roc and some good old music-hall songs include Roll Out the Barrel, Pack Up Your Troubles and Goodbye Sally. Cheerful nonsense."
