= Kathleen Mavourneen (1937 film) =

1939 film by Norman Lee

- Trade advertisement
- Directed by: Norman Lee
- Written by: Clara Mulholland (novel); John Glen; Marjorie Deans
- Produced by: John Argyle
- Starring: Sally O'Neil; Tom Burke; Jack Daly; Sara Allgood
- Cinematography: Bryan Langley
- Edited by: F.H. Bickerton
- Music by: Guy Jones
- Production company: John Argyle Productions
- Distributed by: Wardour Films
- Release date: 2 February 1937
- Running time: 75 minutes
- Countries: Irish Free State; United Kingdom
- Language: English

Kathleen Mavourneen (also known as Kathleen) is a 1937 British-Irish musical drama film directed by Norman Lee and starring Sally O'Neil, Tom Burke and Jack Daly. It was written by Marjorie Deans and John Glen, based on the 1890 novel by Clara Mulholland. It was shot at Welwyn Studios.

The story had been filmed several times previously, including a silent version (1919), starring Theda Bara and a 1930 talkie also starring Sally O'Neil.

== Plot ==
Kathleen O'Moore returns home to rural Ireland and finds she has rivals for her affections in the shape of poor boy Michael Rooney and wealthy squire Dennis O'Dwyer. The two rivals in love team up to rescue Kathleen from her unpleasant aunt who has arranged a loveless but profitable marriage for the girl.

== Partial cast ==
- Sally O'Neil as Kathleen O'Moore
- Tom Burke as Michael Rooney
- Jack Daly as Dennis O'Dwyer
- Sara Allgood as Mary Ellen O'Dwyer
- Jeanne Stuart as Barbara Fitzpatrick
- Ethel Griffies as Hannah O'Dwyer
- Pat Noonan as Sean O'Dwyer
- Arthur Lucan as Old Mother Riley
- Kitty McShane as Kitty Riley
- Fred Duprez as Walter Bryant

== Critical reception ==
The Monthly Film Bulletin wrote: "A delightful Irish domestic comedy, simple in plot but marked by warm-hearted live acting. ... There is a good deal of extraneous matter, such as the wake and the village concert, but actually these are among the most enjoyable parts of the film. Lucan and McShane in their famous slapstick act, the dancers and the pipers, and Tom Burke's songs constitute much of the charm of the film, which has an easy simplicity refreshing to watch."

The Daily Film Renter wrote: "Principal entertainment springs from Hibernian ballads rendered by Tom Burke, and quota of excitement at climax where runaway horses trample smuggler to death. Presentation eschews subtlety for sentimentality, subject's main appeal being for more unsophisticated patronage."

The New York Times said, "An Irish-made picture it is, as flavorsome in its dialogue and occasional glimpses of country life as a horse fair in County Cork; and as silly and sentimental in its story as a poor imitation of Hollywood can be."
