= Variety Parade =

1936 film

- Noni and Teddy Brown in the film
- Directed by: Oswald Mitchell
- Written by: Oswald Mitchell; Con West
- Produced by: Reginald Long; Ian Sutherland
- Cinematography: Jack Parker
- Edited by: Challis Sanderson
- Production company: Malcolm Picture Productions
- Distributed by: Butcher's Film Service
- Release date: 1936
- Running time: 83 minutes
- Country: United Kingdom
- Language: English

Variety Parade is a 1936 British musical revue film directed by Oswald Mitchell. It was written by Mitchell and Con West, and shot at Cricklewood Studios.

== Preservation status ==
The British Film Institute National Archive holds a collection of ephemera and stills but no film or video materials.

== Synopsis ==
The film comprises a series of variety acts performing in an imaginary hotel.

== Cast ==
- Harry Tate as hotel owner
- Harry Beasley
- Teddy Brown
- Sam Browne
- Archie Glen
- Nat Gonella and his Georgians
- Ann Gordon
- Mrs Jack Hylton and her Band
- Corona Kids
- G.S. Melvin
- Three Nagels
- Noni and Partner
- The O'Gorman brothers
- Ennis Parkes and her Boys
- Ernest Shannon
- The Sherman Fisher Girls
- Harry Tate Jr.
- Radio Three
- Ivor Vintnor

== Reception ==
The Monthly Film Bulletin wrote: "A succession of turns by well-known stage and radio variety artists given in a hotel owned and managed by Harry Tate. Some of the turns are not as good as others and the film could have been profitably shortened and given more pace. But it will please and entertain those, for example, who rarely have an opportunity of seeing the artistes who appear in the film. The turns include Nat Gonella and his Georgians; J. S. Melvin [sic]; Ivor Vintor and Ann Gordon; Teddy Brown; the O'Gorman Brothers; Sam Browne; Archie Glen; Ernest Shannon; Mrs. Jack Hylton and her Band; and the Sherman Fisher Girls."

Kine Weekly wrote: "Designed principally to attract and entertain industrial provincial audiences, those who seldom have at opportunity of seeing their favourite radio, cabaret, angel stage stars, this picture, which takes the form of a strong variety bill, is cheery, homely divertissement, a proposition that lends itself admirably to exploitation. The many turns fluctuate a little in quality, and the presentation lacks brevity, but there is nevertheless more than enough top-line talent to keep the entertainment merrily on the boil."

Picture Show wrote: "There is no pretence at any story in this film, which is merely a succession of variety turns strung together. These turns in themselves are excellent, including a variety of singing, xylophone playing, plenty of comedy tums, and a grand finale, including the whole cast. The names in the cast are indicative of the quality of the entertainment."
