= Horace Sheldon =

British composer

Horace Sheldon was a British composer and orchestra leader who wrote scores for both stage and screen. He was employed on multiple West End stage productions such as the 1926 version of Aladdin. During the 1930s Sheldon worked for the low-budget production company Butcher's Film Service as a musical director.

== Selected filmography ==
- Lieut. Daring R.N. (1935)
- Cock o' the North (1935)
- Stars on Parade (1936)
- Melody of My Heart (1936)
- Shipmates o' Mine (1936)
- Song of the Forge (1937)
- Old Mother Riley (1937)
- Annie Laurie (1939)

== Bibliography ==
- Wearing, J.P. The London Stage 1920-1929: A Calendar of Productions, Performers, and Personnel. Rowman & Littlefield, 2014.
