= Challis Sanderson =

British film editor and director (1899–1945)

Challis Sanderson (1899–1945) was a British film editor and director.

== Selected filmography ==
Director

- The Law Divine (1920)
- Three Men in a Boat (1920)
- The Scallywag (1921)
- The Merchant of Venice (1922)
- Cock o' the North (1935)
- Stars on Parade (1936)

=== Editor ===
- Not for Sale (1924)
- The Conspirators (1924)
- We Women (1925)
- Romance in Rhythm (1934)
- Father O'Flynn (1935)
- Lieut. Daring R.N. (1935)
- Variety Parade (1936)
- Love Up the Pole (1936)
- Song of the Forge (1937)
