= Kitty McShane =

Irish actress (1897–1964)

Kitty Mcshane
- Arthur Lucan and Kitty McShane as Old Mother Riley and her daughter 'Kitty'.
- Born: 19 May 1897; Dublin, Ireland
- Died: 24 March 1964 (aged 66); London, England
- Occupation: Actress
- Spouse: Arthur Lucan (1913-1954)
- Partner: Billy Bleach (?-1963)
- Children: Donald Daniel Towie
- Writing career
- Notable work: Old Mother Riley

Kathleen "Kitty" McShane (19 May 1897 – 24 March 1964) was an Irish actress, best known as the wife and acting partner of Arthur Lucan, with whom she appeared in a series of Old Mother Riley stage shows and films from the 1930s to the 1950s.

== Early life ==
Catherine McShane was born in Dublin, Ireland, the fourth of seventeen children born to Daniel and Kate McShane, of whom only seven survived to adulthood. In 1910 Arthur Lucan was touring Ireland and was playing his pantomime Little Red Riding Hood in Dublin. Here he met McShane, who successfully auditioned for a part in the show as a singer. Aged just 16 she married the 28-year-old Lucan on 25 November 1913 at the Church of St Andrews in Dublin. The couple had one son, Donald Daniel Towle (2 October 1915, Dublin – 10 February 1975).

== 'Old Mother Riley' ==
McShane and Lucan became a popular music hall and film double act during their nearly forty years together. They gradually evolved the stage characters of Old Mother Riley, with Lucan appearing in drag as Mrs Daphne Snowdrop Bluebell Riley from Dublin, and McShane playing her daughter 'Kitty Riley', whose wayward ways resulted in many of Mother Riley's amusing reactions.

McShane appeared in 14 of the 15 'Old Mother Riley' films. Lucan and McShane's marriage was difficult, with rumours of McShane's many affairs and volatile temperament, and they separated in 1951. In McShane's last film, Old Mother Riley's Jungle Treasure (1951), their scenes were filmed on separate days. McShane opened a beauty salon, which failed, and Lucan continued to support her financially.

Following Lucan's death in 1954, McShane continued the act with Roy Rolland in the 'Mother Riley' role, but the venture was not successful. The death of her partner, Billy Bleach, in 1963, led to McShane having serious problems with alcohol.

McShane was found dead at her London home on Tuesday 24 March 1964, aged 66, from undisclosed causes.

In 1982 Alan Plater wrote a play about Arthur Lucan's life with Kitty McShane, On Your Way, Riley, with songs by Alex Glasgow. A TV adaptation was broadcast on ITV in 1985, with Brian Murphy and Maureen Lipman in the leading roles.

== Filmography ==
- Stars on Parade (1936)
- Kathleen Mavourneen (1937)
- Old Mother Riley (1937)
- Old Mother Riley in Paris (1938)
- Old Mother Riley, MP (1939)
- Old Mother Riley in Society (1940)
- Old Mother Riley Joins Up (1940)
- Old Mother Riley's Circus (1941)
- Old Mother Riley's Ghosts (1941)
- Old Mother Riley in Business (1941)
- Old Mother Riley Detective (1943)
- Old Mother Riley Overseas (1943)
- Old Mother Riley at Home (1945)
- Old Mother Riley's New Venture (1949)
- Old Mother Riley Headmistress (1950)
- Old Mother Riley's Jungle Treasure (1951)
