= Old Mother Riley, MP =

- Front of house still
- Directed by: Oswald Mitchell
- Written by: Oswald Mitchell; Con West
- Produced by: F.W. Baker
- Starring: Arthur Lucan; Kitty McShane; Torin Thatcher; Henry B. Longhurst
- Cinematography: Geoffrey Faithfull
- Edited by: Daniel Birt
- Music by: Percival Mackey
- Production company: Butcher's Film Service
- Distributed by: Butcher's Film Service
- Release dates: 15 August 1939 (London); 20 January 1940 (UK general release)
- Running time: 77 minutes
- Country: United Kingdom
- Language: English
- Budget: £14,663

Old Mother Riley, MP is a 1939 British comedy film directed by Oswald Mitchell and starring Arthur Lucan and Kitty McShane. It was written by Mitchell and Con West. The film's plot centres on Old Mother Riley standing for election to the House of Commons.

== Plot summary ==
Old Mother Riley is engaged in a fight against her landlord, and a corrupt politician intent on demolishing her street and local pub. She takes to the soapbox, with local crowds cheering her on, and she finds herself elected to Parliament, and eventually promoted to Cabinet Minister for Strange Affairs.

== Cast ==
- Arthur Lucan as Old Mother Riley
- Kitty McShane as Kitty Riley
- Torin Thatcher as Jack Nelson
- Henry Longhurst as Henry Wicker
- Patrick Ludlow as Archie
- Dennis Wyndham as Emperor of Rocavia
- Rex Alderman as Littleman
- Cynthia Stock as the supervisor
- Kenneth Henry as Brownlow

== Critical reception ==
The Monthly Film Bulletin wrote: "Farcical burlesque. Further adventures of this redoubtable and popular 'heroine'. ... This fantastic story is almost entirely dependent on Arthur Lucan for its entertainment value, but he is quite equal to the demands made upon him. In familiar makeup he does his stuff, clowns with tremendous gusto and energy, indulges in extravagant gestures and ludicrous antics, while pouring forth a continuous stream of quick patter and lively gags, both old and new. There is an unfailing succession of vigorous knockabout and broadly humorous slapstick. It is good, honest music hall, of the robust type, and as such will appeal widely. The supporting players have little to do, and seem rather conscious that this is the case."

Kine Weekly wrote: "Arthur Lucan works hard as the excitable harridan Old Mother Riley. He is easily the best old dame on the screen and, for that matter, stage and music-hall. Kitty McShane is an attractive foil as Kitty. ... The star, robust and resourceful as he is, is not, however, permitted to steal all the limelight. An eager and resourceful supporting cast and adequate staging in the House of Commons sequences are really good, preserve balance and contribute to pep."

TV Guide wrote, "graced with an insane plot... Nonsensical but full of laughs."
