= Music Hall Parade =

- Directed by: Oswald Mitchell
- Screenplay by: Oswald Mitchell; Con West
- Produced by: Oswald Mitchell
- Starring: Glen Raynham; Richard Norris; Charles Sewell
- Cinematography: Geoffrey Faithfull
- Edited by: Daniel Birt
- Music by: Percival Mackey (musical director)
- Production company: Butcher's Film Service
- Distributed by: Butcher's Film Service (UK)
- Release date: 1939; (UK)
- Running time: 80 min.
- Country: United Kingdom
- Language: English
- Budget: £11,700

Music Hall Parade (also known as Cavalcade of Variety) is a 1939 British musical film directed by Oswald Mitchell and featuring Glen Raynham, Richard Norris, Charles Sewell and Sid Palmer. It was written by Mitchell and Con West and was reissued in 1940 as Cavalcade of Variety.

== Plot ==
A daughter works to keep her father's music hall going after his death, set against performances from a variety of music hall acts.

== Cast ==
- Glen Raynham
- Richard Norris
- Charles Sewell
- Sid Palmer
- Tom Gamble
- Frank E. Franks
- The Three Jokers
- Hughie Green
- Eve Becke
- the Arnaut Brothers
- the Australian Motor Air Aces
- Freddie Forbes
- Angela Barrie
- Jack Stanford, "The Dancing Fool"
- Billy Cotton and his band

== Production ==
The film was produced at the Walton on Thames studios.

== Critical reception ==
The Monthly Film Bulletin wrote: "The actual entertainment is provided by the variety of turns in the show. These include Frank E. Franks, north-country comedian, in a domestic sketch; the Three Jokers in eccentric comedy; Hughie Green's well-known impersonations; Tom Gamble, in a skit on a solicitor; Eve Becke and her songs; the Arnaut Brothers in an extremely entertaining act called Bird Courtship; the daring Australian motor air aces; Freddie Forbes and Angela Barrie in domestic sketches; Jack Stanford, the 'dancing fool', and a grand finale by Billy Cotton and his Band, Glen Raynham and Richard Norris are competent as the two youngsters who run Parker's Music Hall, while the direction of the film as a whole is so well handled that all the varied elements blend into a smooth continuity which results in excellent entertainment."

Kine Weekly wrote: "Here is a vaudeville entertainment that sets out to captare the hearty, exuberant spirit of the English music-hall. The basic romantic theme although slight, admirably knits together the presentation of first-rate topliners, and although the story is naturally episodic, it nevertheless meets with no small measure of success. ... It is not, it will be observed, the story, but the talent it introduces that counts with this picture. First comes Hughie Green: his impersonations are excellent. ... Next come Sid Palmer and Tom Gamble, both of whom score singly and in concert in comedy character parts. Freddie Forbes and Angela Barry also deserve a hand for their 'Close-ups on Marriage,' while Billy Cotton and his Band appropriately wind up the proceedings. There are other acts and a touch of sentiment to complete the entertainment. The treatment has enough gumption and showmanship enough to permit of no impediment in the presentation of the acts; they go to make a show which has all and more than the suburban music-hall can offer."

Picturegoer wrote: "Various turns are given and one stands out – that of Hughie Green in impersonations of various film stars woven into a comedy skit. "Close-ups" on marriage by Freddie Forbes and Angela Barry is amusing, and Billy Cotton and his band orchestrate the proceedings with never-flagging verve"

Picture Show wrote: "The story of this film is merely a means of introducing the many varied and entertaining variety turns on which it depends for its appeal. It deals with a music-hall, saved from closing down by a commissionaire who presents new talent. Among the variety turns can be mentioned Hughie Green's clever little melodramatic skit in which he plays all the characters after the style of stage or screen stars; the thrilling act by the Australian Motor Air Aces; the Amaut Brothers giving us a 'Bird Courtship.'"

In British Sound Films: The Studio Years 1928–1959 David Quinlan rated the film as "average", writing: "Smoothly made review film."

TV Guide called it above average with a thin plot but fun acts.

== Home media ==
Renown Pictures released a digitally remastered edition of the film in 2011.
