= Oswald Mitchell =

British director (1890–1949)

Oswald Albert Mitchell (1890 – April 27, 1949) was a British film director who directed several of the Old Mother Riley series of films.

== Selected filmography ==
- The Guns of Loos (1928, producer)
- Such Is the Law (1930, producer)
- Danny Boy (1934)
- Cock o' the North (1935)
- King of Hearts (1936)
- Love Up the Pole (1936, producer)
- Variety Parade (1936)
- Shipmates o' Mine (1936)
- Old Mother Riley (1937)
- Lily of Laguna (1938)
- Night Journey (1938)
- Little Dolly Daydream (1938)
- Almost a Gentleman (1938)
- Old Mother Riley in Paris (1938)
- Music Hall Parade (1939)
- Old Mother Riley, MP (1939)
- Pack Up Your Troubles (1940)
- Sailors Don't Care (1940)
- Jailbirds (1940)
- Danny Boy (1941)
- Bob's Your Uncle (1942)
- Asking for Trouble (1942)
- Old Mother Riley Overseas (1943)
- Old Mother Riley at Home (1945)
- Loyal Heart (1946)
- The Mysterious Mr. Nicholson (1947)
- Black Memory (1947)
- The Greed of William Hart (1948)
- House of Darkness (1948)
- The Temptress (1949)
- The Man from Yesterday (1949)
