= Percival Mackey =

British pianist, composer and bandleader (1894–1950)

Thomas Percival Montague Mackey (1 June 1894 – 23 November 1950) was a British pianist, composer and bandleader. He is particularly known for his work as a composer and musical director for films during the 1930s and 1940s.

== Life and career ==
Mackey was born on 1 June 1894 in London, England, one of seven children of music publisher Thomas Mackey. He learned to play piano at a young age, and when he was 14 he toured as a pianist with a one-man travelling show, which consisted of ventriloquism, magic and comedy. As part of this show, Mackey improvised a musical soundtrack to a silent film. At the age of 18, he joined the Royal Irish Animated Picture Company in Tipperary, Ireland, a travelling film show managed by Arthur Jameson. Mackey played as part of a musical trio alongside a 72-year-old trumpeter and a fiddler who was often drunk.

After the First World War, during which he served with the Durham Light Infantry, Mackey moved to Brighton and after a while started playing with Jack Hylton's orchestra. In the early 1920s, he formed an ensemble of his own, known as the Broadway Five. In this band Mackey played the piano, accompanied by Dick Langham (tenor sax), Bert Heath (trumpet), Bill Blanche (banjo) and Ralph Hussey (drums). He later became one of Britain's foremost dance band leaders, working with many other musicians, including Al Bowlly (1929), Art Christmas (1931–33), Jack Jackson (1930–31) and Ivor Mairants (1929).

During the 1920s, Mackey was also the musical director for several West End musicals, including No, No, Nanette at the Palace Theatre in 1925, and Follow Thru at the Dominion in 1929.

In 1929, he appeared in a short film directed by Bertram Phillips, The Percival Mackey Trio, made in the Phonofilm sound-on-film process. From the beginning of the 1930s, he began to be involved in film work, as both a film score composer and a musical director. Film scores composed by Mackey include Talk of the Devil (1936), Service for Ladies (1932) and Charing Cross Road (1935).

Towards the end of 1934, Mackey was appointed the Director of Dance Music at EMI, for which Mackey directed several bands including the New Mayfair Dance Orchestra.

Mackey was married to actress, singer and dancer Monti Ryan. He died in Edgware, Middlesex, on 23 November 1950.

== Selected filmography ==
- A Man of Mayfair (1931)
- This Is the Life (1933)
- Girls, Please! (1934)
- Honeymoon for Three (1935)
- Cheer Up (1936)
- Accused (1936)
- Skylarks (1936)
- Chick (1936)
- Crime Over London (1936)
- Jump for Glory (1937)
- The Minstrel Boy (1937)
- Lily of Laguna (1938)
- Night Journey (1938)
- A Spot of Bother (1938)
- Lightning Conductor (1938)
- Music Hall Parade (1939)
- Garrison Follies (1940)
- Pack Up Your Troubles (1940)
- You Will Remember (1941)
- Hard Steel (1942)
- Front Line Kids (1942)
- Gert and Daisy's Weekend (1942)
- Gert and Daisy Clean Up (1942)
- The Missing Million (1942)
- Variety Jubilee (1943)
- I'll Walk Beside You (1943)
- Headline (1944)
- Loyal Heart (1946)
- Take Me to Paris (1951)
