= Vivien Leigh on stage and screen =

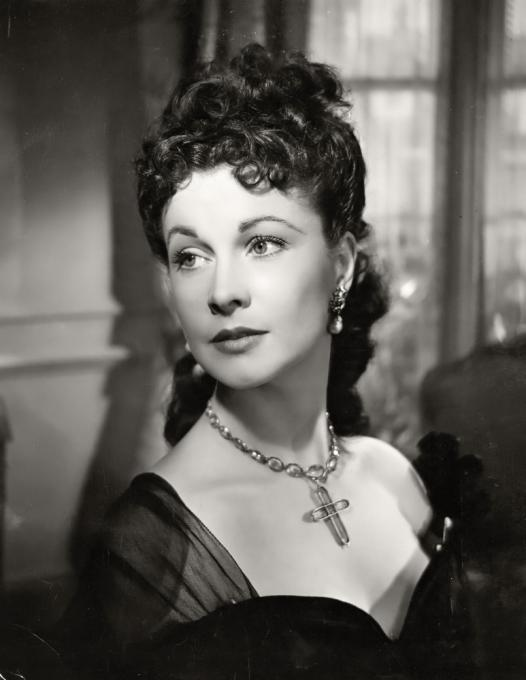
Vivien Leigh in 1948

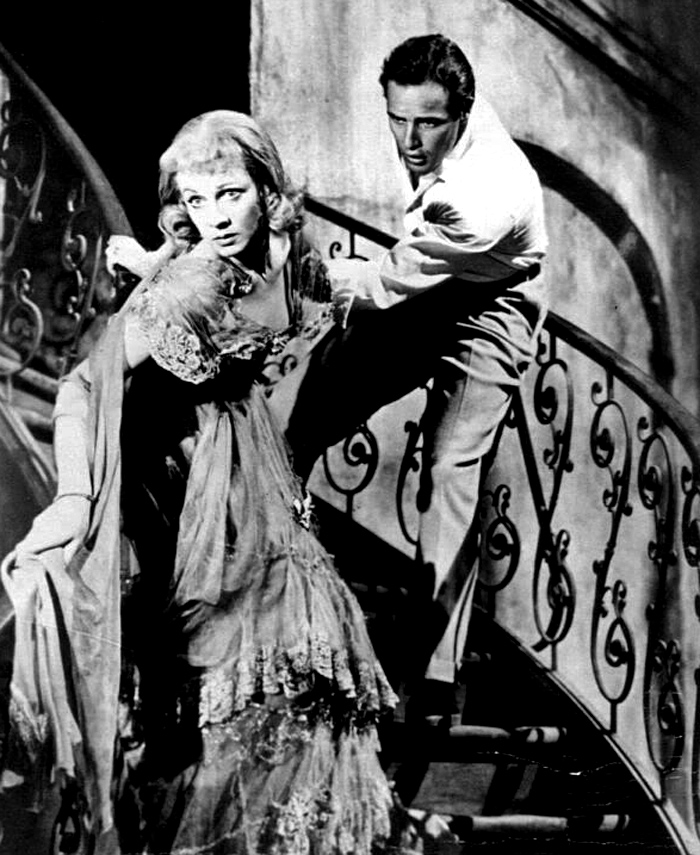
Vivien Leigh and Marlon Brando in the 1951 film A Streetcar Named Desire

British actress Vivien Leigh (1913–1967) was born in Darjeeling, India; her family returned to England when she was six years old. In addition to her British schooling, Leigh was also educated in France, Italy, and Germany, and became multilingual. Classically trained at the Royal Academy of Dramatic Art, her film debut was in an uncredited role in the 1935 comedy Things Are Looking Up.

While studying Shakespearean drama at The Old Vic, she met Laurence Olivier, who would become her most frequent artistic collaborator. Even though her film roles brought her global name recognition and acclaim, the bulk of her work was in theatrical productions, frequently with Olivier as her director and/or co-star. Many of their productions on the British stage were based on the works of William Shakespeare. In 1943, as part of the Old Vic Spring Party, they toured North Africa for three months entertaining British troops. In 1961, they were part of The Old Vic Tour of Australia, New Zealand, Mexico and South America.

She appeared in 19 theatrically released films, twice winning the Academy Award for Best Actress, both times for her dramatic depictions of women from the American South. Her first Oscar was in 1939, for her performance in Gone with the Wind as Margaret Mitchell's protagonist Scarlett O'Hara. She won the role after a two-year search for the ideal actress had eliminated many of Hollywood's top talents. Her second Oscar was in 1951, for A Streetcar Named Desire. Playwright Tennessee Williams saw her on the London stage, and after conveying his impressions to co-producer Irene Mayer Selznick, Leigh was signed for the role of Blanche DuBois in the 1949 London production of the play. After playing the role of DuBois for 326 performances, Leigh was flown to Los Angeles to begin filming the movie version.

Her star was placed on the Hollywood Walk of Fame on February 8, 1960.

== Stage ==
Title	Date	Theatre	Role	Director	Notes/Playwright(s)	Ref(s)
The Green Sash	1935	Q Theatre	Giusta	Matthew Forsyth	Debonnaire Sylvester; T. P. Wood	
The Mask of Virtue	1935	Ambassadors Theatre	Henriette Duquesnoy	Maxwell Wray	Carl Sternheim and Ashley Dukes	
Richard II	1936	Oxford University Dramatic Society	Queen Anne	John Gielgud; Glen Byam Shaw	William Shakespeare	
The Happy Hypocrite	1936	His Majesty's Theatre	Jenny Mere	Maurice Colbourne	Clemence Dane	
Henry VIII	1936	Open Air Theatre, Regent's Park	Anne Boleyn	Robert Atkins	William Shakespeare	
Because We Must	1937	Wyndham's Theatre	Pamela Golding-Ffrench	Norman Marshall	Ingaret Giffard	
Bats in the Belfry	1937	Ambassadors Theatre	Jessica Morton	A. R. Whatmore	Diana Morgan and Robert MacDermot	
Hamlet	1937	Kronborg Castle, Elsinore	Ophelia	Tyrone Guthrie	William Shakespeare	
A Midsummer Night's Dream	1937	Open Air Theatre, Regent's Park	Titania	Tyrone Guthrie	William Shakespeare Jeanne de Casalis	
Serena Blandish	1938	Gate Theatre	Serena Blandish	Esme Percy	S. N. Behrman and Enid Bagnold	
Romeo and Juliet	1940	51st Street Theatre, New York City, also San Francisco, Chicago and Washington, D.C.	Juliet	Laurence Olivier	William Shakespeare	
The Doctor's Dilemma	1942	Haymarket Theatre	Jennifer Dubedat	Irene Hentschel	George Bernard Shaw	
"Old Vic Spring Party — A Revue"	1943	3-month tour of North Africa entertaining troops	Herself and as Scarlett O'Hara	John Gielgud	works by Lewis Carroll and Clemence Dane	
The Skin of Our Teeth	1945	Phoenix Theatre	Sabina	Laurence Olivier	Thornton Wilder	
The Skin of Our Teeth (revival)	1946	Piccadilly Theatre	Sabina	Laurence Olivier	Thornton Wilder	
Richard III	1948	Old Vic Company Tour of Australia and New Zealand	Lady Anne	Laurence Olivier	Thornton Wilder	
The School for Scandal	1948	Old Vic Company Tour of Australia and New Zealand	Lady Teazle	Laurence Olivier	Richard Brinsley Sheridan	
The Skin of Our Teeth (revival)	1948	Old Vic Company Tour of Australia and New Zealand	Sabina	Laurence Olivier	Thornton Wilder	
The School for Scandal	1949	New Theatre for the Old Vic Company	Lady Teazle		Richard Brinsley Sheridan	
Richard III	1949	New Theatre for the Old Vic Company	Lady Anne	Laurence Olivier	Thornton Wilder	
Antigone	1949	New Theatre for the Old Vic Company	Antigone	Laurence Olivier	Sophocles	
A Streetcar Named Desire	1949	Aldwych Theatre	Blanche DuBois	Laurence Olivier	Tennessee Williams	
Caesar and Cleopatra	1951	St James's Theatre	Cleopatra	Michael Benthall	George Bernard Shaw alternated nightly with Antony and Cleopatra	
Antony and Cleopatra	1951	St James's Theatre	Cleopatra	Michael Benthall	William Shakespeare alternated nightly with Caesar and Cleopatra	
Caesar and Cleopatra	1951	Ziegfeld Theatre, New York City	Cleopatra	Michael Benthall	George Bernard Shaw alternated nightly with Antony and Cleopatra	
Antony and Cleopatra	1951	Ziegfeld Theatre, New York City	Cleopatra	Michael Benthall	William Shakespeare alternated nightly with Caesar and Cleopatra	
The Sleeping Prince	1953	Phoenix Theatre	Mary Morgan	Laurence Olivier	Terence Rattigan	
Twelfth Night	1955	Stratford-upon-Avon	Viola	John Gielgud	William Shakespeare	
Macbeth	1955	Stratford-upon-Avon	Lady Macbeth	Glen Byam Shaw	William Shakespeare	
Titus Andronicus	1955	Stratford-upon-Avon	Lavinia	Peter Brook	William Shakespeare	
South Sea Bubble	1956	Lyric Theatre	Lady Alexandra Shotter	William Chappell	Noël Coward	
Titus Andronicus	1957	European Tour, followed by Stoll Theatre, London	Lavinia	Peter Brook	William Shakespeare	
Duel of Angels	1958	Apollo Theatre	Paola	Jean-Louis Barrault	Jean Giraudoux; Christopher Fry	
Look After Lulu!	1959	Royal Court Theatre, then New Theatre	Lulu d'Arville	Tony Richardson	Georges Feydeau translated by Noël Coward	
Duel of Angels	1960	Helen Hayes Theatre, New York City	Paola	Robert Helpmann	Jean Giraudoux; Christopher Fry	
Twelfth Night	1961	Old Vic Company Tour of Australia, New Zealand and South America	Viola	Robert Helpmann	William Shakespeare	
Duel of Angels	1961	Old Vic Company Tour of Australia, New Zealand and South America	Paola	Robert Helpmann	Jean Giraudoux	
Lady of the Camellias	1961	Old Vic Company Tour of Australia, New Zealand and South America	Marguerite Gautier	Robert Helpmann	Alexandre Dumas	
Tovarich	1963	Broadway Theatre, New York City	Grand Duchess Tatiana I	Peter Glenville	Robert E. Sherwood	
La Contessa	1965	Newcastle, Liverpool and Manchester	Contessa Sanziani	Robert Helpmann	Paul Osborn and Maurice Druon	
Ivanov	1966	Shubert Theatre, New York City	Anna Petrova	John Gielgud	Anton Chekhov	

== Films ==
Title	Year	Role	Director	Notes	Ref(s)
Things Are Looking Up	1935	Schoolgirl uncredited	Albert de Courville; Stafford Dickens	Gaumont British Picture Corporation	
The Village Squire	1935	Rose Venables	Reginald Denham	British and Dominions Imperial Studios	
Gentlemen's Agreement	1935	Phil Stanley	George Pearson	British and Dominions Imperial Studios	
Look Up and Laugh	1935	Marjorie Belfer	Basil Dean	Associated Talking Pictures	
Fire Over England	1937	Cynthia	William K. Howard	London Film Productions	
Dark Journey	1937	Madeleine	Victor Saville	London Film Productions	
Storm in a Teacup	1937	Victoria Gow	Ian Dalrymple; Victor Saville	London Film Productions	
A Yank at Oxford	1938	Elsa Craddock	Jack Conway	MGM-British	
St. Martin's Lane	1938	Libby	Tim Whelan	US release 1940 as Sidewalks of London; Mayflower Pictures	
Gone with the Wind	1939	Scarlett O'Hara	Victor Fleming	Academy Award for Best Actress; David O. Selznick producer First American film	
Waterloo Bridge	1940	Myra Lester	Mervyn LeRoy	MGM	
21 Days	1940	Wanda Wallen	Basil Dean	aka 21 Days Together, Three Weeks Together and The First and the Last, originally filmed in 1937; release delayed until after Gone with the Wind; London Film Productions	
That Hamilton Woman	1941	Emma, Lady Hamilton	Alexander Korda	Alexander Korda Films	
Caesar and Cleopatra	1945	Cleopatra	Gabriel Pascal	Gabriel Pascal Productions	
Anna Karenina	1948	Anna Karenina	Julien Duvivier	Producers Alexander Korda; Herbert Mason	
A Streetcar Named Desire	1951	Blanche DuBois	Elia Kazan	Academy Award for Best Actress; Charles K. Feldman	
The Deep Blue Sea	1955	Hester Collyer	Anatole Litvak	London Films	
The Roman Spring of Mrs. Stone	1961	Karen Stone	José Quintero	Seven Arts Productions	
Ship of Fools	1965	Mary Treadwell	Stanley Kramer	Stanley Kramer Productions	

== Bibliography ==
- Bean, Kendra (2013). Vivien Leigh: An Intimate Portrait. Philadelphia, Pennsylvania : Running Press Book Publishers. ISBN 978-0-7624-5099-2.
