= List of compositions by Eric Coates =

Below is a sortable list of compositions by Eric Coates. The works are categorized by genre, date of composition and title.

Genre	Date	Title	Notes
Stage	1930	Snow White and the Seven Dwarfs	Incidental music; revised in 1938 as The Enchanted Garden
Stage	1932	The Jester at the Wedding	Ballet
Stage	1938	The Enchanted Garden	Tone poem
Stage		March of the Knight of Malta	Operetta
Orchestral	1904	Ballad, op 2	for string orchestra
Orchestral	1911	Miniature Suite: 1. Children's Dance; 2. Intermezzo; 3. Scène du Bal	for small orchestra
Orchestral	1912	A La Gavotte	
Orchestral	1912	The Mermaid, A Graceful Dance	
Orchestral	1915	From the Countryside, Suite: 1. In the Meadows (Early Morning); 2. Among the Poppies (Afternoon); 3. At the Fair (Evening)	
Orchestral	1918	Wood Nymphs, Valsette	
Orchestral	1919	Springtime, Suite: 1. Fresh Morning; 2. Noonday Song; 3. Dance in the Twilight	
Orchestral	1919	Summer Days, Suite: 1. In a Country Lane; 2. On the Edge of the Lake; 3. At the Dance	
Orchestral	1920	Coquette	
Orchestral	1921	Moresque, Dance Interlude	
Orchestral	1922	Joyous Youth, Suite: 1. Introduction; 2. Serenade; 3. Valse "Joyous Youth"	
Orchestral	1923	The Merrymakers, Miniature Overture	
Orchestral	1925	2 Light Syncopated Pieces: 1. Moon Magic; 2. Roses of Samerkand	
Orchestral	1925	The Selfish Giant, Phantasy	inspired by the story by Oscar Wilde
Orchestral	1926	By the Tamarisk, Intermezzo	
Orchestral	1926	The Three Bears, Phantasy	from the fairy story Goldilocks and the Three Bears
Orchestral	1928	Four Ways, Suite: 1. Northwards – March; 2. Southwards – Valse; 3. Eastwards – Eastern Dance; 4. Westwards – Rhythm	
Orchestral	1929	The Unknown Singer, Interlude	
Orchestral	1930	By the Sleepy Lagoon, Valse Serenade	also for voice and piano, used as theme for the BBC radio programme Desert Island Discs
Orchestral	1930	Cinderella, Phantasy	
Orchestral	1930	With a Song in My Heart	orchestral arrangement of the song from the Richard Rodgers and Lorenz Hart musical Spring Is Here
Orchestral	1931	From Meadow to Mayfair, Suite: 1. In the Country: Rustic Dance; 2. A Song by the Way: Romance; 3. Evening in the Town: Valse	
Orchestral	1932	Dancing Nights, Concert Valse	
Orchestral	1932	The Jester at the Wedding, Suite from the Ballet: 1. The Princess Arrives; 2. Dance of the Pages; 3. The Jester; 4. Dance of the Orange Blossoms; 5. The Princess; 6. The Princess and the Jester	
Orchestral	1933	London Suite (aka London Everyday): 1. Covent Garden; 2. Westminster; 3. Knightsbridge – In Town Tonight	
Orchestral	1933	2 Symphonic Rhapsodies: 1. I Pitch My Lonely Caravan; 2. I Heard You Singing / Birdsongs at Eventide	
Orchestral	1934	London Bridge, March	
Orchestral	1935	Song of Loyalty	also for voice and piano
Orchestral	1935	The Three Men Suite: 1. The Man from the Country; 2. The Man about Town; 3. The Man from the Sea	
Orchestral	1936	The Forgotten Waltz	
Orchestral	1936	London Again, Suite: 1. Oxford Street: March; 2. Langham Place: Elegie; 3. Mayfair: Valse	
Orchestral	1936	Saxo Rhapsody	
Orchestral	1937	For Your Delight, Serenade	
Orchestral	1938	Seven Seas, March	
Orchestral	1939	Footlights, Concert Valse	
Orchestral	1939	Last Love, Romance	
Orchestral	1940	Calling All Workers, March	theme for the BBC radio programme Music While You Work
Orchestral	1942	The Eighth Army, March	also for piano solo; used in the 1943 film Nine Men
Orchestral	1942	Over to You, March	
Orchestral	1942	Star of God	
Orchestral	1943	Four Centuries Suite: 1. The Seventeenth Century – Prelude and Hornpipe; 2. The Eighteenth Century – Pavane and Tambourin; 3. The Nineteenth Century – Valse; 4. The Twentieth Century – Rhythm	
Orchestral	1943	London Calling, March	
Orchestral	1944	Salute the Soldier, March	
Orchestral	1944	The Three Elizabeths Suite: 1. Halcyon Days (Elizabeth Tudor); 2. Springtime in Angus (Elizabeth of Glamis); 3. Youth of Britain (Princess Elizabeth)	Halcyon Days was used as the opening and closing music for the 1967 BBC television series The Forsyte Saga
Orchestral	1945	Youth of Britain, March	
Orchestral	1946	Television March	Used as the daily startup music of BBC Television Service.
Orchestral	1949	Music Everywhere, Rediffusion March	Used as the daily startup music of Associated-Rediffusion 1956–57. The piece pre-dates the television station and had been renamed by the Rediffusion company with Coates' permission.
Orchestral	1950	Holborn, March	
Orchestral	1953	Men of Trent, March	
Orchestral	1953	Rhodesia, March	
Orchestral	1954	The Dam Busters March	used in the 1955 film The Dam Busters
Orchestral	1954	Sweet Seventeen, Concert Valse	
Orchestral	1955	Sound and Vision, Television March	Used as the daily startup music of Associated TeleVision in London weekend programmes from 1955 to 1968 and Midlands from 1956 to 1971.
Orchestral	1956	Impressions of a Princess, Intermezzo	
Orchestral	1957	High Flight, March	
Orchestral	1957	South Wales and West, Television March	Used as the daily startup music of Television Wales and the West from 1958 to 1968.
Orchestral		The Dance of the Orange Blossoms, Valse	
Orchestral		I Sing to You	
Orchestral		Lazy Night	
Orchestral		Rustic Dance	
Chamber music	1906	Ballad in G major, Op. 13	for viola and piano; composed under the pseudonym "Eric Glendower"
Chamber music	1908	Minuetto on Old Irish Melody	for string quartet; movement IV from Suite on Londonderry Air, a collaborative work for string quartet co-composed with Frank Bridge, Hamilton Harty, J. D. Davis and York Bowen
Chamber music	1928	Mirage, Romance	for violin and piano (also orchestral version)
Chamber music	1929	Under the Stars	for violin and piano (also orchestral version)
Chamber music	1941	First Meeting, Souvenir	for viola and piano; written for violist Lionel Tertis; revised for violin and piano in 1943, also as a song
Piano	1911	6 Short Pieces (without Octaves): 1. Prelude; 2. A Little Song; 3. Élégie; 4. Alla Menuetto; 5. Valse; 6. Slumber Song	
Piano	1914	Idyll	
Piano	1930	3 Lyric Pieces: 1. Fragment; 2. Nocturne; 3. Valse	
Piano	1942	The Eighth Army, March	also orchestrated
Vocal	1908	A Damask Rose	words by Fred G. Bowles
Vocal	1908	It Was a Lover and His Lass	words by William Shakespeare
Vocal	1908	The Outlaw's Song	words by Joanna Baillie
Vocal	1908	2 Songs: 1. Swedish Love Song; 2. Devon to Me	for baritone and piano 1. words by Georgia Roberts; 2. words by John Galsworthy
Vocal	1908	When I Am Dead	words by Christina Rossetti
Vocal	1908	When We Two Went A-Maying	words by Ella Brown
Vocal	1908	Who Is Sylvia?	words by William Shakespeare
Vocal	1909	At Daybreak	words by Fred G. Bowles
Vocal	1909	4 Old English Songs: 1. Orpheus with His Lute; 2. Under the Greenwood Tree; 3. Who is Sylvia?; 4. It Was a Lover and His Lass	words by William Shakespeare
Vocal	1909	The Gates of Spring	words by Frederic Weatherly
Vocal	1909	Gwenny	words by Frederic Weatherly
Vocal	1909	May-Day Dance	4-part song; words by M. Byron
Vocal	1909	Stone-Cracker John	words by Frederic Weatherly
Vocal	1909	Sweet Phyllis	words by Frederic Weatherly
Vocal	1909	Your Heart Is Like a Golden Fair	words by Ella Brown
Vocal	1909	Yvette	words by Frederic Weatherly
Vocal	1910	Lace and Porcelain, 3 Old World Songs: 1. Love Is Every Maiden's Joy; 2. Strephon and Amaryllis; 3. A Cavalier Love Song	words by Harold Simpson
Vocal	1910	The Little Girl I Love	words by Frederic Weatherly
Vocal	1910	Little Love	words by Georgeanne Hubi Newcombe
Vocal	1910	Love among the Daffodils	words by Edward Teschemacher
Vocal	1910	Waiting for the Spring	words by Frederic Weatherly
Vocal	1910	When the Robin Goes A-Singing	words by Harold Simpson
Vocal	1911	A Bird's Lullaby	words by the composer
Vocal	1911	If You Were My Little Boy	words by Edward Teschemacher
Vocal	1911	Love's Fantasy	words by Frederic Weatherly
Vocal	1911	The Moon Boat	words by Frederic Weatherly
Vocal	1911	Mother England's Brewing	words by Harold Simpson
Vocal	1911	Reuben Ranzo	words by Frederic Weatherly
Vocal	1912	The Awakening	words by Edward Teschemacher
Vocal	1912	A Dinder Courtship	words by Frederic Weatherly
Vocal	1912	Rose of Mine	words by Edward Teschemacher
Vocal	1912	Sweet-and-Twenty	words by William Shakespeare
Vocal	1912	Tell Me Where Is Fancy Bred	words by William Shakespeare
Vocal	1913	All Mine Own	words by Harold Simpson
Vocal	1913	Betty and Johnny	words by Frederic Weatherly
Vocal	1913	Dick's Quandary	words by Frederic Weatherly
Vocal	1913	The Grenadier	words by Frederic Weatherly
Vocal	1913	Melanie	words by Frederic Weatherly
Vocal	1913	Pierrette's Song	words by Frederic Weatherly
Vocal	1914	By Mendip Side	words by P. J. O'Reilly
Vocal	1914	Eildon Hill	words by Frederic Weatherly; see Eildon Hill
Vocal	1914	The Hour of Love	words by Harold Simpson
Vocal	1914	A Japanese Farewell	words by Douglas Furber
Vocal	1914	Marry Me, Nancy, Do!	words by Frederic Weatherly
Vocal	1914	Moonland Dreams	words by Frederic Weatherly
Vocal	1914	Rose of the World	words by Helen Taylor
Vocal	1915	The Mill o' Dreams, Cycle of 4 Little Songs: 1. Back o' the Moon; 2. Dream o' Nights; 3. The Man in the Moon; 4. Blue Bells	words by Nancie B. Marsland; for voice and piano or orchestra
Vocal	1916	The Green Hills o' Somerset	words by Frederic Weatherly; for voice and piano or orchestra
Vocal	1916	An Old World Garden	words by Eric Chilman
Vocal	1916	The Palace of Roses	words by Harold Simpson
Vocal	1916	Sigh No More, Ladies	words by William Shakespeare
Vocal	1916	The Widow of Penzance	words by Harold Simpson
Vocal	1917	Asphodel	words by Frederic Weatherly
Vocal	1917	Dreams	words by Frederic Weatherly
Vocal	1917	Land of My Heart	words by Frederic Weatherly
Vocal	1917	Our Little Home	words by Frederic Weatherly
Vocal	1917	Your Love	words by Frederic Weatherly
Vocal	1918	The Fairy Tales of Ireland	words by Edward Lockton; for voice and piano or orchestra
Vocal	1918	4 Songs of the Air Service: 1. Ordered Overseas; 2. Five and Twenty Bombers; 3. Billy; 4. The First Job of All	words by Edward Lockton
Vocal	1918	The Fruits of the Earth	words by Edward Lockton
Vocal	1918	The Heart You Love Is Calling	words by Edward Lockton
Vocal	1918	The Maid and the Moon	words by Eileen Price-Evans
Vocal	1918	My Prayers Take Wings to Find You	words by Harold Simpson
Vocal	1918	Sally and I and the Daylight	words by Frederic Weatherly
Vocal	1918	Yours and Mine	words by Edward Lockton
Vocal	1919	By the North Sea	words by Arthur Conan Doyle
Vocal	1919	An Elizabethan Lullaby	words by William Akerman
Vocal	1919	A Nest in Arcady	words by Edward Lockton
Vocal	1919	Roses of Peace	words by E. Barker
Vocal	1919	The Stars Above	words by Haydn H. Morris
Vocal	1919	Through All the Ages	words by Frederic Weatherly
Vocal	1920	At Sunset	words by Mrs Charles Hutchins
Vocal	1920	At Vesper Bell	words by Gunby Hadath
Vocal	1920	Pepita	words by Douglas Furber
Vocal	1920	Since Yesterday	words by Anne Page
Vocal	1920	The White Winding Road	words by Daisy Fisher
Vocal	1920	You Come No More	words by Daisy Fisher
Vocal	1921	Brown Eyes beneath the Moon	words by Frederic Weatherly
Vocal	1921	I'm Wanting You	words by Gunby Hadath
Vocal	1921	I Pitch My Lonely Caravan at Night	words by Annette Horey
Vocal	1921	Moon Daisies	words by Frederic Weatherly
Vocal	1921	Passion-Flower	words by Gertrude Wiskin
Vocal	1921	Roses All the Way, Foxtrot	words by Ernest Butcher
Vocal	1922	Blue Sky and White Road	words by Charles Roff
Vocal	1922	Coloured Fields	words by Daisy Fisher
Vocal	1922	June's First Rose	words by Edward Lockton
Vocal	1922	Ole Dear	words by Dorothy Dickinson
Vocal	1922	Thinkin' of You	words by Dorothy Dickinson
Vocal	1923	I Heard You Singing	words by Royden Barrie; for voice and piano or orchestra
Vocal	1923	Mending Roadways	words by Dena Tempest
Vocal	1923	Nobody Else But You	words by Daisy Fisher
Vocal	1923	A Song of the Wind	words by Edward Lockton
Vocal	1924	Diff'rent Somehow	words by Gordon McConnel
Vocal	1924	8 Nursery Rhymes: 1. Pussy Cat, Pussy Cat; 2. Mary, Mary, Quite Contrary; 3. Little Boy Blue; 4. Baa, Baa, Black Sheep; 5. Miss Muffet; 6. Pat-a-cake, Pat-a-cake; 7. Hush-a-bye; 8. New Year's Eve	words by anonymous
Vocal	1924	Ev'ry Minute of Ev'ry Day	words by Elsie Mary Skeet
Vocal	1924	In Town	words by Dorothy Dickinson
Vocal	1924	Sea Rapture, an Impression	words by Emeric Hulme-Beaman
Vocal	1924	Yearning	words by Royden Barrie
Vocal	1925	The Gates of If-Ever	words by D. Eardley-Wilmot
Vocal	1925	K-Naughty Kanute	words by Elsie Mary Skeet
Vocal	1925	The Little Green Balcony	words by Royden Barrie
Vocal	1925	Little Snoozy Coon	words by Royden Barrie
Vocal	1925	Rose of Samarand	words by Royden Barrie
Vocal	1925	Song of the Little Folk	words by Jennie Dunbar
Vocal	1926	Bird Songs at Eventide	words by Royden Barrie; for voice and piano or orchestra
Vocal	1926	Brown Eyes I Love	words by Lillian Glanville
Vocal	1927	The Dreams of London	words by Almey St. John Adcock
Vocal	1927	A Song Remembered	words by Royden Barrie
Vocal	1928	Homeward to You	words by Royden Barrie
Vocal	1928	I'm Lonely, Valse Song	words by Gordon McConnel
Vocal	1928	Little Lady of the Moon	words by Frederic Weatherly
Vocal	1929	Always As I Close My Eyes	words by Maud Handfield-Jones
Vocal	1929	Doubt	words by Florence Hedley-Stodden (né Florence Gertrude Altenborough)
Vocal	1930	Because I Miss You So	words by Lillian Glanville
Vocal	1930	The Young Lover	words by Royden Barrie
Vocal	1931	Home-Along	words by Arthur L. Salmon
Vocal	1932	The House Love Made for You and Me	words by Gordon Johnstone
Vocal	1932	If Stars Were Tears	words by Frank Eyton
Vocal	1932	Stars and a Crescent Moon	words by Phyllis Black
Vocal	1933	I Looked for You	words by Phyllis Black
Vocal	1933	Rise Up and Reach the Stars	words by Winifred May
Vocal	1933	Ship of Dream	words by Winifred van Noorden
Vocal	1934	Beautiful Lady Moon	words by Phyllis Black
Vocal	1934	Music of the Night	words by Phyllis Black
Vocal	1935	Song of Loyalty	words by Phyllis Black
Vocal	1935	Good Bye	words by Irving Caesar
Vocal	1938	You Are My Rose	words by Christopher Hassell
Vocal	1938	Your Name	words by Christopher Hassell; for voice and piano or orchestra
Vocal	1939	Princess of the Dawn	words by Christopher Hassell
Vocal	1940	Sleepy Lagoon	words by Jack Lawrence
Vocal	1940	Today is Ours	words by Frank Eyton
Vocal	1942	Star of God	words by Frederic Weatherly
Vocal	1943	A Song of Summer	words by Lady Joan Vernay; for voice and piano or orchestra
Vocal	1954	The Scent of Lilac	words by Winifred May
Vocal	1956	The Dam Busters	words by Carlene Mair
Choral	1956	God's Great Love Abiding, Hymn	for mixed chorus; words by the composer
Choral	1963	Loyal Hearts	for mixed chorus and piano; arrangement of Queen Elizabeth from The three Elizabeths Suite; words by Anne C Wood

== Sources ==
- Geoffrey Self. In Town Tonight: A Centenary Study of Eric Coates (1986) (includes worklist)
