= The First Offence =

- Original trade ad
- Directed by: Herbert Mason
- Written by: Stafford Dickens; Austin Melford
- Based on: Mauvaise Graine
- Produced by: Michael Balcon
- Starring: John Mills; Lilli Palmer; Bernard Nedell
- Cinematography: Arthur Crabtree
- Edited by: Michael Gordon
- Music by: Allan Gray; Franz Waxman
- Production company: Gainsborough Pictures
- Distributed by: Gaumont-British Distributors
- Release date: March 1936; United Kingdom
- Running time: 66 minutes
- Country: United Kingdom
- Language: English

The First Offence is a 1936 British low-budget "quota quickie" drama film directed by Herbert Mason, produced by Michael Balcon for Gainsborough Pictures and distributed by Gaumont-British Distributors. The cast includes John Mills, Lilli Palmer and Bernard Nedell. The story was written by Stafford Dickens and Austin Melford. It is a remake of the 1934 French film Mauvaise Graine, directed by Billy Wilder.

The First Offence was released to cinemas in the United Kingdom in March 1936.

== Plot ==
A wealthy doctor's rich and spoiled son, Johnnie Penrose joins a gang of car thieves in France after being denied a car by his father.

== Cast ==
- John Mills as Johnnie Penrose
- Lilli Palmer as Jeanette
- Bernard Nedell as The Boss
- Michel André as Michel
- H. G. Stoker as Doctor Penrose
- Jean Wall as The Zebra
- Paul Velsa as Peanuts
- Marcel Maupi as Man in Panama Hat
- Judy Kelly as Girl in Garage
- Marcel André as Michel

== Production ==
The film was originally called Bad Blood and was going to star Paul Robeson.

Filming took place in London.

== Bibliography ==
- Bergfelder, Tim & Cargnelli, Christian. Destination London: German-speaking emigrés and British cinema, 1925-1950. Berghahn Books, 2008.
- Neale, Stephen. (2012). The Classical Hollywood Reader. Routledge
