= Eliot Makeham =

English actor (1882–1956)

- in The Million Pound Note (1954)
- Born: Harold Elliott Makeham; 22 December 1882; London, England
- Died: 8 February 1956 (aged 73); London, England
- Other names: • Eliott Makeham • Elliot Makeham
- Occupation: Actor
- Years active: 1936–1956
- Spouses: Anne de Vries, Rose E. Kerr, Betty Shale

Harold Elliott Makeham (22 December 1882 – 8 February 1956) was an English film and television actor.

== Career ==
Makeham was born in London, England. Between 1931 and 1956, Makeham appeared, primarily in character roles, in 115 films and in 11 television productions. He played a small number of leading roles in the 1930s, but was more regularly seen in cameos as harassed officials or henpecked husbands.

== Personal life ==
Married three times, Makeham's third wife was British character actress, Betty Shale.

== Selected filmography ==
- Rome Express (1932) - Mills
- I'm an Explosive (1933) - Prof. Whimperly
- Forging Ahead (1933) - Abraham Lombard
- The Lost Chord (1933) - Bertie Pollard
- I Lived with You (1933) - Mr. Wallis
- I Was a Spy (1933) - Pharmacist (uncredited)
- Friday the Thirteenth (1933) - Henry Jackson
- The Roof (1933) - John Rutherford
- The Laughter of Fools (1933) - John Gregg
- Home, Sweet Home (1933) - James Merrick
- The Crimson Candle (1934) - Dr. Gaunt
- Princess Charming (1934) - The Real Walter Chuff (uncredited)
- Orders Is Orders (1934) - Pvt. Slee
- Bypass to Happiness (1934) - Miller
- Unfinished Symphony (1934) - Joseph Passenter
- Falling in Love (1934) - Caretaker (uncredited)
- Lorna Doone (1934) - John Fry
- Peg of Old Drury (1935) - Dr. Bowdler (uncredited)
- Her Last Affaire (1935) - Dr. Rudd (uncredited)
- Mr. Cohen Takes a Walk (1935) - Storekeeper (uncredited)
- Two Hearts in Harmony (1935) - Wagstaff
- Once in a New Moon (1935) - Harold Drake
- The Last Journey (1936) - Pip
- Someone at the Door (1936) - (uncredited)
- A Star Fell from Heaven (1936) - Music Professor
- To Catch a Thief (1936) - Secretary
- Calling the Tune (1936) - Stephen Harbord
- The Brown Wallet (1936) - Hobday
- Born That Way (1936) - Prof. Gearing
- East Meets West (1936) - Goodson
- Tomorrow We Live (1936) - Henry Blossom
- The Mill on the Floss (1936) - Mr. Pullet (uncredited)
- Head Over Heels (1937) - Martin
- Dark Journey (1937) - Anatole Bergen
- Take My Tip (1937) - Digworthy
- Farewell Again (1937) - Maj. Swayle
- Storm in a Teacup (1937) - Sheriff
- Racing Romance (1937) - George Hanway
- East of Ludgate Hill (1937)
- Merely Mr. Hawkins (1938) - Alfred Hawkins
- Darts Are Trumps (1938) - Joe Stone
- Coming of Age (1938) - Henry Strudwick
- Vessel of Wrath (1938) - The Native Head Clerk
- It's in the Air (1938) - Sir Philip's Gardener
- Weddings Are Wonderful (1938) - Minor role
- You're the Doctor (1938) - Prout
- The Citadel (1938) - Jack the Pharmacist (uncredited)
- Keep Smiling (1938) - Printer (uncredited)
- Everything Happens to Me (1938)
- Anything to Declare? (1938) - Prof. Grayson
- Bedtime Story (1938) - Uncle Toby
- Me and My Pal (1939) - Cripps
- The Nursemaid Who Disappeared (1939) - Mr. Hines
- Inspector Hornleigh (1939) - Alexander Parkinson, Leather Worker
- The Four Just Men (1939) - Simmonds
- Return to Yesterday (1940) - Fred Grover
- Spy for a Day (1940) - Mr. Trufit
- Pastor Hall (1940) - Pippermann
- A Window in London (1940) - Stage Doorman (uncredited)
- Just William (1940) - Man in sweet shop (uncredited)
- Busman's Honeymoon (1940) - Simpson
- Night Train to Munich (1940) - Schwab
- Saloon Bar (1940) - Meek Man
- Spare a Copper (1940) - Fuller
- Facing the Music (1941) - Secretary
- The Common Touch (1941) - 'Inky'
- Suspected Person (1942) - David
- They Flew Alone (1942) - Mayor of Croydon
- Let the People Sing (1942) - Town clerk
- Uncensored (1942) - Abbe De Moor
- Schweik's New Adventures (1943) - Prof. Jan Borski
- Yellow Canary (1943) - Observer Corpsman in Opening Scene (uncredited)
- Bell-Bottom George (1944) - Johnson
- The Hundred Pound Window (1944) - Bank Teller (uncredited)
- The Halfway House (1944) - The Dresser
- A Canterbury Tale (1944) - Organist
- Champagne Charlie (1944) - Vance's Songwriter (uncredited)
- Give Us the Moon (1944) - Dumka
- Don't Take It to Heart (1944) - Roberts (uncredited)
- Candles at Nine (1944) - Everard Hope
- Madonna of the Seven Moons (1945) - Bossi
- I'll Be Your Sweetheart (1945) - John Friar
- Perfect Strangers (1945) - Mr. Staines
- The Magic Bow (1946) - Giuseppe
- Code of Scotland Yard (1947) - Usher at Concert Hall (uncredited)
- The Life and Adventures of Nicholas Nickleby (1947) - Postman
- Frieda (1947) - Bailey
- Jassy (1947) - Moult - the Butler
- The Little Ballerina (1947) - Mr. Maggs
- Call of the Blood (1948) - Laboratory assistant (uncredited)
- So Evil My Love (1948) - Joe Helliwell
- Daybreak (1948) - Mr. Bigley
- Love in Waiting (1948) - Sam Baxter
- No Room at the Inn (1948) - News Editor
- Vote for Huggett (1949) - Mr. Christie
- Forbidden (1949) - Pop Thompson
- Murder at the Windmill (1949) - Gimpy
- Children of Chance (1949) - Vicar
- Night and the City (1950) - Pinkney (scenes deleted)
- Trio (1950) - Sexton (in segment The Verger)
- The Miniver Story (1950) - Mr. Farraday (uncredited)
- Dick Barton at Bay (1950) - Police Sergeant (uncredited)
- Scarlet Thread (1951) - Jason
- Scrooge (1951) - Mr. Snedrig
- Green Grow the Rushes (1951) - James Urquhart
- The Crimson Pirate (1952) - Governor
- Decameron Nights (1953) - Governor of Majorca
- The Yellow Balloon (1953) - Pawnbroker
- Always a Bride (1953) - Roger, Hotel Guest
- The Fake (1953) - George
- Meet Mr. Lucifer (1953) - Edwards
- Stryker of the Yard (1953) - Uncle Henry Petheridge
- The Million Pound Note (1954) - Consulate Official (uncredited)
- Fast and Loose (1954) - Railway porter (uncredited)
- The Weak and the Wicked (1954) - Grandad Baden
- Doctor in the House (1954) - Elderly Examiner
- The Rainbow Jacket (1954) - Valet
- Companions in Crime (1954) - Councillor Sandford
- Sailor Beware! (1956) - Uncle Brummell

== Selected stage roles ==
- Blue Comet by Eden Phillpotts (1926)
- The Return of the Soldier by John Van Druten (1928)
- Married for Money by Will Scott (1939)

== Death ==
He died in London aged 73.
