= A Window in London =

1940 film

- Directed by: Herbert Mason
- Written by: Brigid Cooper; Ian Dalrymple
- Screenplay by: Ian Dalrymple
- Story by: R. Herbert; Max Maret
- Produced by: Richard Norton; Josef Somlo
- Starring: Michael Redgrave; Sally Gray; Paul Lukas; Hartley Power; Patricia Roc
- Cinematography: Glen MacWilliams
- Edited by: Philip Charlot
- Music by: Bretton Byrd
- Production companies: Greenspan & Seligman Enterprises Ltd.
- Distributed by: General Film Distributors; Times Pictures
- Release dates: 15 June 1940 (United Kingdom); 14 February 1942 (US)
- Running time: 77 minutes
- Country: United Kingdom
- Language: English

A Window in London is a 1940 British thriller film directed by Herbert Mason, written by Brigid Cooper and Ian Dalrymple for Greenspan & Seligman Enterprises Ltd and distributed by General Film Distributors. The cast includes Michael Redgrave, Patricia Roc, Sally Gray, Paul Lukas and Hartley Power. It is a remake of the French film Metropolitan (1939). The plot focuses on a man who becomes drawn to the wife of a jealous magician - after spotting what appears to be a murder in their flat.

The film is set in London, and was made when Waterloo Bridge was still under construction. It was released in the US in 1942 under the title Lady in Distress and released to cinemas in the United Kingdom on 15 June 1940.

== Plot ==
Pat is a hotel switchboard operator at an exclusive London apartment block (the exterior location is actually Dolphin Square). She completes her night shift exhausted and has forgotten to give a client his 6am alarm call. She walks cheerfully home to her new husband Peter, a crane operator. They are a happy couple, but they have little time together, because while he works during the day on the construction of Waterloo Bridge, his wife works a night shift on a hotel telephone exchange. His workmates rib him about his 'night starvation'.

One morning, Peter is on the Tube on his way to work when he spots what seems to be a murder being committed on a balcony: a man stabbing a woman. Deciding to investigate, Peter and a policeman arrive at the residence, but the man there, Zoltini, tells them that they were merely rehearsing an illusion for a stage act. Zoltini is a bad-tempered magician and his wife Vivienne is his assistant. Peter offers Zoltini money to ease his alleged problems, and takes the dummy knife as a souvenir of the event. The policeman takes Peter's name and address so the inspector can thank him. After he leaves, the two get into an argument because Zoltini had lied about the incident. Peter gets threatened with the sack for being late to work, and a reporter intervenes and tries to get a story. Peter's picture and the story appear in the evening paper, calling him a hero. But his workmates have seen the fake knife, and they mock him.

After work, Peter goes to see Zoltini but only Vivienne is there. She invites him to go and see their show that evening. When Zoltini arrives later and hears Peter has been there, he gets angry. Peter gets home as the alarm goes off for Pat to get up and go to work.

Max, an impresario, who is attracted to Vivienne, offers to take her away and get her better work. Peter arrives in the dressing room to collect his free ticket. Zoltini appears and again gets angry, being suspicious about Peter again being around his wife. He throws the money he borrowed to the floor.

Later, as they are due to appear on stage, Zoltini and Vivienne have an argument, leading to him slapping her in the face immediately before the show starts. In his final showcase trick, Viviene should disappear and reappear in a trunk; she disappears but is not in the trunk, much to his embarrassment, and he is booed by the audience and sacked by the manager. Vivienne has left in a taxi with Peter. They go up to his crane on Waterloo Bridge and Peter kisses her. A night watchman below hears them moving around and talking, and when he surprises them, they leave and go to Max's nightclub.

Pat arrives at work and gets the sack for her shortcomings on the night before.

A revengeful Zoltini goes to a cafe where he has been told he will find the taxi driver and questions him.

In the nightclub, Max gets one of his hostesses to entertain Peter while Max talks with Vivienne. Peter gets drunk on champagne and starts singing with the band. Vivienne realises she has left her handbag in the crane and asks Peter to go back for it. The night watchman has already found the bag and gives it to Peter. Zoltini arrives and recognises the bag as Vivienne's, and attacks Peter. They fight, and Zoltini ends up falling in the river and floats away unconscious. Peter thinks he has killed him. When he returns to the nightclub, Vivienne is signing a contract with Max. He tells her that he has killed Zoltini.

Meanwhile, at the hotel the guest who missed his flight is actually pleased, as the flight crashed, killing everyone on board. He insists that the hotel manager re-employ Pat and also offers her a job as his secretary.

Peter walks the streets in a daze. Pat marches home in an elated mood, as she now has a day job. Peter says he has killed a man. They are alarmed by a knock on the door, but it is the night watchman saying the river police pulled Zoltini out alive. Zoltini reconciles with Vivienne. But as a happy Pat and Peter go past their window on the Tube train, Zoltini finds Vivienne's contract and a ticket to New York which Max put in her purse, and shoots her dead. She falls in a position where she cannot be seen just as the train passes. Peter tells Pat that is the window where it all started and hopes that couple are as happy as themselves.

== Cast ==
- Michael Redgrave as Peter
- Sally Gray as Vivienne
- Paul Lukas as Louis Zoltini
- Hartley Power as Max Preston
- Patricia Roc as Pat
- Glen Alyn as Andrea
- Gertrude Musgrove as Peggy the second telephonist
- George Carney as night watchman
- Bryan Coleman as constable
- Alf Goddard as Tiny
- Wilfred Walter as foreman
- George Merritt as manager
- John Salew as reporter
- Kimberley And Page as Specialities
- Pamela Randell as Specialities
- Eliot Makeham as doorman (uncredited)

== Production ==
Filming took place at Waterloo Bridge which was still under construction. Filming also took place at the Thames Embankment, the Chelsea Palace, the Savoy Court, Dolphin Square and on the London District Railway. On 8 June 1939, Kinematograph Weekly announced that exterior scenes would "be filmed at Baron's Court Underground Station and in Parliament Square."

Eliot Makeham who had an uncredited role as the doorman previously had roles in Mason's East Meets West and Take My Tip. In the past when Patricia Roc saw several West End productions, she saw "many of the great actors" (including Michael Redgrave) perform on stage. The "central plot" of A Window in London inspired Jules White's short 1946 film Hiss and Yell.

== Release ==
A Window in London was released theatrically in London in 1940 and 1942 in USA. The running time of the American release was 8 minutes shorter than the original running time. In July 2015 (over 75 years after the film's theatrical release), the BFI launched the Britain On Film archive, in which thousands of unseen films (including A Window in London) have been digitised and available for viewing via the BFI player. Later that year as part of the London on Film season from September to October, A Window in London was shown at BFI Southbank (near where filming took place).

== Reception ==
Despite being a rare and unseen film for 75 years, the film has recently been praised for the location used for shooting. At the time, A Window in London was generally well received and marked out for the direction and narration. The Monthly Film Bulletin praised the film for the use of location and the cast. This film is considered to be Patricia Roc's "best acting" role - despite not having as large a role as the other actors of the main cast. Additionally the Monthly Film Bulletin said that, "Patricia Roc gives a charming little character study of a working girl wife." The Sydney Morning Herald said that "[the] story has the fascination of the unexpected."

Although the New York Times said that it was "muddily photographed and poorly directed", Michael Hodgson considers the film to be one of Mason's "interesting films" as well as "a dark and disturbing remake of Maurice Cam's French circular drama Metropolitain" in his biography about Patricia Roc. Tom Ryall mentioned that A Window in London contains similar themes to Hitchcock. Robyn Karney in Radio Times described the film as "a short, modest but intriguing British-made thriller with a satisfyingly neat twist in the tale". In 2015, BFI head curator Robin Baker said that, “Having [Waterloo Bridge] as a bridge over our own cinema and seeing it at that moment of appearing in a feature film is pretty fantastic. It is a darned good film as well.” Edd Elliott said that the film "lacks Hitchcockian suspense, but garners much of its contemporary’s narrative subtlety."

== See also ==
- Waterloo Bridge

== Bibliography ==
=== Primary sources ===
- Kinematograph Weekly, 27 April 1939
- Kinematograph Weekly, 8 June 1939
- The Cinema, 1 November 1939
- The Monthly Film Bulletin, November 1939
- London Life in New British Films, The Herald, 6 July 1939

=== Secondary sources ===
- Gourvish, Terry. (2014). Dolphin Square: The History of a Unique Building. A & C Black
- Hodgson, Michael. (2013). Patricia Roc. AuthorHouse (Paperback edition)
- F. Keaney, Michael. (2008). British Film Noir Guide. Performing Arts
- Leitch, Thomas and Poague, Lehand. (2011). A Companion to Alfred Hitchcock. John Wiley & Sons
- Maltin, Leonard. (2015). Turner Classic Movies Presents Leonard Maltin's Classic Movie Guide: From the Silent Era Through 1965. Penguin. Third edition
- Spicer, Andrew. (2010). Historical Dictionary of Film Noir. Scarecrow Press
