= Daisy Fisher =

English writer (1887–1969)

- Born: Daisy Gertrude Fisher; 7 November 1887; Hampstead, London, England
- Died: 2 April 1969 (aged 81); Hendon, London, England
- Other names: Daisy Mason; D. G. Mason
- Occupations: Novelist; lyricist; scriptwriter; playwright; actress; singer
- Years active: 1920–1951
- Spouse: Herbert Mason (m. 1914; died 1960)
- Children: 2
- Parent(s): William Edgar Fisher (father); Emma Louisa Fisher (née Beasley) (mother)
- Relatives: Benjamin Beasley

Daisy Gertrude Fisher (7 November 1887 – 2 April 1969) was an English novelist and playwright. She was the writer of several romantic novels, a lyricist, scriptwriter, actress and singer. In the 1920s she wrote the lyrics for some of Eric Coates' compositions. In 1926 she published her first book Lavender Ladies A Comedy in Three Acts followed by more in the 1930s. Fisher authored some plays with the song writer Harold Simpson, Ronald Jeans and Clifford Seyler. She was the wife of Herbert Mason the film director and producer who previously acted on stage (including several productions at the Birmingham Repertory Theatre). After the Second World War they worked together on some plays.

== Early life ==
Daisy Gertrude Fisher was born on 7 November 1887 to William Edgar Fisher (an accountant) and Emma Louisa (née Beasley) daughter of Benjamin Beasley. After Brampton Park burned down in 1907 she turned to the theatre and joined as a chorus girl.

== Career ==
One of Fisher's earliest plays was Cinderella performed at the Birmingham Repertory Theatre (26 December 1914– 29 January 1915). Fisher and the composer Eric Coates starred in The Punch Bowl, which Herbert Mason a stage actor stage managed and choreographed. Fisher's comedy play Lavender Ladies was performed at the Comedy Theatre from 29 July – 21 November 1925. The play starred Herbert Marshall and Louise Hampton. Additionally it was Lydia Sherwood's debut on stage. Fisher and Harold Simpson were authors of The Cave Man, which Mason also presented, produced and had a role in. Louise Hampton also had a part in the play.

In 1933 The Hill Beyond was published. It acts as a sequel to The Gates Swings Open and is about a girl from between settling down in the countryside with her husband or an exciting life in the theatrical world in London. In 1935 Fisher wrote the story for Things Are Looking Up with Albert de Courville, Stafford Dickens and Con West. It was the film debut for Vivien Leigh who had an uncredited role as a school girl. In 1937 Fisher's A Ship Comes Home was performed at St Martin's Theatre, London. The play starred Michael Redgrave who later had a role in Mason's A Window in London. Mason and Fisher financed and were authors of Lend Me Robin (1948), which was shown at Embassy Theatre a few years before it was sold to the Central School of Speech and Drama. It was a comedy about a wife who tries to win back her philandering husband (portrayed by Charles Goldner) by taking a lover. The play also starred William Mervyn who later had a part in Conflict of Wings produced by Mason. Three years later they worked on an eternal triangle thriller Dangerous Woman.

== Personal life and family ==
Fisher first met her future husband when they were in a play about David Garrick with Mason taking the lead. In 1914 they married before Mason and her brother fought in the First World War. Her brother Leslie Fisher was killed in action at the age of 30 on 14 August 1915. She survived Mason with their daughter and son. Their son Michael (b. December 1924) became a radio producer at the BBC and wrote several books.

Daisy Fisher died on 2 April 1969 in London.

== Publications ==
Genre	Year	Title
Comedy	1925	Lavender Ladies A Comedy in Three Acts
	1930	Pie Crust
	1931	Memory of Grange
	1932	The Gate Swings Open
	1933	The Hill Beyond
	1936	A Heart Was Lost
Comedy	1948	A Ship Comes Home A Play in Three Acts

== Lyricist ==
Genre	Year	Title	Composer	Notes	Ref.
Stage	1920	Mary's Orchard	Eric Coates	Operetta	
Vocal	1920	The White Winding Road	Eric Coates		
Vocal	1920	You Come No More	Eric Coates		
Vocal	1920	Autumn Love	Eric Coates	(unpublished)	
Vocal	circa 1921–24	Everything is Simply Fine and Life is Completely Jolly		(unpublished)	
	circa 1921–24	The Inconstant Lover		(unpublished)	
	circa 1921–24	Why I sigh for the Moon			
Vocal	1922	Coloured Fields	Eric Coates		
Vocal	1923	Nobody Else but You	Eric Coates		
Stage	1924	Ullo (revue)		Co wrote with Henry Creamer, Clifford Seyler and Jack Stachey	
	(undated)	The Challenge		(unpublished)	
	(undated)	Purple Heather		(unpublished)	

== Filmography ==
=== Film ===
Year	Film	Credit	Notes
1935	Things Are Looking Up	Scriptwriter	Co wrote with Stafford Dickens, Con West and Albert de Courville

== Theatre ==
Year	Title	Playwright	Actress	Theatre	Notes	Ref.
1912	The Follies		Yes	Royal Lyceum Theatre and Apollo Theatre	(with H. G. Pelissier's Follie's Company)	
1914–15	Cinderella	Yes		Birmingham Repertory Theatre		
1923–26	Lavender Ladies	Yes		Strand Theatre, Comedy Theatre, London and Lyric Theatre, London		
1924	Our Cabaret	Yes		The Victorian Theatre	(with Ronald Jeans and Clifford Seyler)	
1924–25	The Punch Bowl		Yes	Duke of York's Theatre, London and His Majesty's Theatre, London		
1927	The Cave Man	Yes		The Theatre Royal, Portsmouth and Savoy Theatre, London	(with Harold Simpson)	
1936–37	A Ship Comes Home	Yes		St Martin's Theatre, London		
1948	Lend Me Robin	Yes		Embassy Theatre, London	(with Herbert Mason)	
1951	Dangerous Woman	Yes		Wimbledon Theatre, London	(with Herbert Mason)	

== Bibliography ==
=== Secondary sources ===
- Gale, Maggie. (1996). West End Women and the London Stage 1918–1962. Routledge
- Reid, John Howard. (2005). Hollywood's Miracles of Entertainment. Lulu.com
- Wearing, J.P. (1982). The London Stage 1910–1919: A Calendar of Productions, Performers and Personnel. Rowman & Littlefield Education
- Wearing, J.P. (2014). The London Stage 1920–1929: A Calendar of Productions, Performers and Personnel. Rowman & Littlefield Education (2nd edition)
- Wearing, J.P. (2014). The London Stage 1930-1939: A Calendar of Productions, Performers and Personnel. Rowman & Littlefield
- Wearing, J.P. (2014). The London Stage 1940–1949: A Calendar of Productions, Performers and Personnel. Rowman & Littlefield Education (2nd edition)
- Payne, Michael. (2013). The Life and Music of Eric Coates. Ashgate Publishing Ltd
- D'Arcy Mackay, Constance. (1927). Children's Theatres and Plays. D. Appleton & Company
- Barranger, Milly S. (2004). Margaret Webster: A Life in the Theater. University of Michigan Press
- Hobson, Harold. (1950). Theatre – Volume 2. Longmans, Green and Co
- Kemp, Thomas C. (1943). Birmingham Repertory Theatre: The Playhouse and the Man. Cornish Brothers Limited
- Major and Mrs Holt. (1990). The Biography of Captain Bruce Bairnsfather: In Search of the Better Ole. Pen and Sword
