= M. R. Peacocke =

English poet

- Born: Margaret R. Bennett; 1930 (age 95–96); Reading, Berkshire
- Occupation: English poet

Margaret Ruth Peacocke (born 1930), also known as Meg Peacocke, is an English poet.

== Life ==
Peacocke was born Margaret Ruth Bennett in Reading, Berkshire to Joan Esther, née Spink (1901–1983) and (Harry) Rodney Bennett (1890–1948), a children's author and lyricist. She had an elder sister Anne (b.1926) and younger brother, the composer Richard Rodney Bennett (1936–2012), with whom she collaborated on a number of vocal and choral works, starting in the 1980s. She grew up in South Devon and she studied English at St Anne's College, Oxford.

In 1958, she married Gerald S. P. Peacocke, although they have since divorced. She has four children: Tamsin Peacocke, who has four children; Tully Peacocke; Barnaby Peacocke, who has two children; and Harriet Peacocke, who also has two children.

== Awards ==
- Cholmondeley Award 2005

== Works ==
- Marginal Land. Peterloo Poets. 1988. Out of print.
- Selves. Peterloo Poets. 1995.
- Speaking of the Dead. Peterloo Poets. 2003. Reprinted 2004, 2005, 2012.
- In Praise of Aunts. Peterloo Poets. 2011 [2008].
- Caliban Dancing. Shoestring. 2013 [2012].
- Finding the Planes - New and Selected. 2015.
- Broken Ground. 2018.
