= Dr. O'Dowd =

1940 British film by Herbert Mason

- Shaun Glenville and Peggy Cummins in the film
- Directed by: Herbert Mason
- Screenplay by: Austin Melford; Derek Twist
- Story by: L.A.G. Strong
- Based on: A novel by L.A.G. Strong
- Produced by: Sam Sax
- Starring: Shaun Glenville; Peggy Cummins; Felix Aylmer; Irene Handl
- Cinematography: Basil Emmott
- Production company: Warner Bros.
- Distributed by: Warner Bros.
- Release date: 22 June 1940 (United Kingdom)
- Running time: 76 minutes
- Country: United Kingdom
- Language: English
- Budget: £18,276
- Box office: £14,804

Dr. O'Dowd is a lost 1940 British drama film directed by Herbert Mason, produced by Sam Sax for Warner Bros and starring Shaun Glenville, Peggy Cummins, Felix Aylmer and Irene Handl. It was written by Austin Melford and Derek Twist.

Set in Ireland, it focuses on Marius O'Dowd, an Irish doctor, who works to restore his relationship with his son after his daughter-in-law dies under O'Dowd's care.

== Preservation status ==
The film is missing from the BFI National Archive, and is listed as one of the British Film Institute's "75 Most Wanted" lost films. No sequences of film are known to survive, although the BFI does possess a collection of stills from the production.

== Plot ==
Marius O'Dowd is an Irish doctor who is often drunk. His daughter-in-law Moira dies during a serious operation which O'Dowd is performing. Although O'Dowd is not to blame, his son Stephen suspects that Moira died due to O'Dowd operating while under the influence of alcohol, and accuses him of criminal neglect. O'Dowd consequently has his license to practice medicine taken away. Stephen also does not tell his daughter Pat that Marius is her grandfather, although several years later she becomes friends with Marius and works this out. Marius eventually manages to redeem himself by saving Stephen's life during an outbreak of diphtheria.

== Cast ==
- Shaun Glenville as Marius O'Dowd
- Peggy Cummins as Pat O'Dowd
- Mary Merrall as Constantia
- Liam Gaffney as Stephen O'Dowd
- Patricia Roc as Rosemary
- James Carney as O'Hara
- Felix Aylmer as President
- Irene Handl as Sarah
- Walter Hudd as Doctor Crowther
- Pat Noonan as Mulvaney
- Maire O'Neill as Mrs Mulvaney
- Charles Victor as Dooley
- Pamela Wood as Moira

== Production ==
Most of the filming for Dr. O'Dowd took place at the Warner Bros. studios in Teddington, with outdoor sequences shot in Cumberland in north west England and in County Wicklow, Ireland. The filming was undertaken in the summer of 1939, concluding just after the start of World War II. Warner Bros. employed a number of different experts as advisers to ensure the film was realistic, including a doctor, a nurse, an angler and a billiards player.

Dr. O'Dowd was the film debut for 13-year-old Peggy Cummins, who later starred in films such as Gun Crazy and The Night of the Demon. Cummins had caught the attention of film executives after appearing in a 1938 production named Let's Pretend in London, and this film was the beginning of a deal signed with Warner Bros. As part of an agreement with the London County Council, Cummins was limited to five hours of filming per day and had to be supervised by a governess. The film was also a debut for her co-star Shaun Glenville, a music hall performer. This was only one of two film roles Glenville played in his career.

== Release ==
Dr. O'Dowd was distributed by the production studio Warner Bros. in 1940, with an initial trade showing in London on 16 January 1940. It had a public release in UK and Ireland in the same year. It was also distributed in America and Australia.

== Reception ==
Kine Weekly wrote: "Medical melodrama with an Emerald Isle setting, holding a mirror to the Irish temperament and character. Its reflections are not exactly profound, but thanks to convincing atmosphere and first-rate acting they interest and, more important still, entertain. Juvenile Peggy Cummins is, incidentally, a real discovery. ... Shaun Glenville contributes a qualnt and accurate characterisation as the human, drink-loving O'Dowd, Mary Merrell is clever in a comedy character part, and Liam Gaffney is sound as Stephen. The most ingratiating -performance of all, however, comes from Peggy Cummins as Pat. Given the chance, she'll go far. ... Good story, competent treatment, captivating juvenile angle, effective dramatic twists, good comedy and excellent atmosphere."

The Monthly Film Bulletin wrote: "This moving film is convincingly directed and ably acted. The kindly, humorous, impatient old Doctor is admirably portrayed by Shaun Glenville, Mary Merrell is delightful as his absent-minded but lovable sister, and Peggy Cummins is charming as his grand-daughter, Pat. The settings appear authentic and the Irish atmosphere is well captured."

The Daily Film Renter wrote: "Leisurely story of imbibing medico's fall from grace and eventual restitution. Good character lead by Shaun Glenville, and appealing juvenile study from Peggy Cummins. Diverting but over-garrulous Irish life sidelights, and pleasing outdoor locations."

Picturegoer wrote: "There is not a great deal of depth to this medical drama, but it has a shrewd insight to Irish character and temperament. Moreover the acting is good and the settings are picturesque. ... Peggy Cummins, Stephen's small daughter, is a distinct discovery, and her future promises very well indeed."

Variety wrote: "A weak script will tend to hold this picture to lower brackets for home playing. Its U. S. chances are slight. Neither settings nor camera re-create authentically the atmosphere of the river Shannon, upon which picture presumably hangs. Plot runs heavy on tear-jerker theme, via rehabilitation of old-time medico branded as a tippler. Shaun Glenville carries well this O'Dowd role. ... A little tighter direction might have helped players. Particularly is this true of the moppet, Peggy Cummins who performs creditably under the circumstances though script depends too much on her."

In Australia, The Examiner described it as "one of the surprise hits of the year".

Halliwell's Film Guide describes it as a "somewhat woebegone tearjerker with an interesting cast".
