= Yvonne (musical) =

1926 British musical

Yvonne is a musical comedy with a book and lyrics by Percy Greenbank and music by Jean Gilbert and Vernon Duke (at that time still using his birth name of Dukelsky). It was adapted by Greenbank from an Austrian musical of the same name. Some additional songs were written by the show's conductor, Arthur Wood. The story concerns an engaged young lady, Yvonne Savigny, the daughter of old professor who loves riotous gaiety. To avoid trouble, she impersonates an absent music hall star at the Scala Music Hall. A young man has fallen in love with Yvonne and disguises himself as a servant in her father's house. After various complications, Yvonne leaves her silly fiancé for the amorous suitor and all ends happily.

Yvonne was first played in the British provinces before premiering at Daly's Theatre, London, in May 1926, directed by Herbert Mason and produced by the company originally created by impresario George Edwardes. Ivy Tresmand took the title role, and Arthur Pusey co-starred as Yvonne's suitor. Other cast members included Maria Minetti, who played the music hall star; Mark Lester as Professor Savigny, Horace Percival and later Gene Gerrard as the hapless fiancé, and American dancer Hal Sherman as a comic waiter and gardener. After its London run of 280 performances, the company again toured the productionin the UK.

The musical did not go down well with critics; Noël Coward was one of those who disliked it, referring to it as "Yvonne the Terrible". It was Greenbank's last major work for the West End stage.
