= Command Performance (1931 film) =

1931 film

- Directed by: Walter Lang
- Written by: Stafford Dickens
- Produced by: Samuel Zierler
- Cinematography: Charles Schoenbaum
- Production company: Tiffany Pictures
- Release date: January 19, 1931
- Running time: 60 minutes
- Country: United States
- Language: English

Command Performance is a 1931 American pre-Code drama film directed by Walter Lang.

== Cast ==
- Neil Hamilton as Peter Fedor/Prince Alexis
- Una Merkel as Princess Katerina
- Helen Ware as Queen Elinor
- Albert Gran as King Nicholas
- Lawrence Grant as Count Vellenburg
- Thelma Todd as Lydia
- Vera Lewis as Queen Elizabeth
- Mischa Auer as Duke Charles
- Burr McIntosh as Masoch
- Wilhelm von Brincken as Capt. Boyer
- Murdock MacQuarrie as Blondel
