= It's in the Bag (1944 film) =

Film by Herbert Mason

- Film poster
- Directed by: Herbert Mason
- Written by: Con West
- Produced by: F. W. Baker (unconfirmed)
- Starring: Elsie Waters; Doris Waters; Ernest Butcher
- Cinematography: Geoffrey Faithfull; Gerald Gibbs
- Edited by: Percival Mackey
- Music by: Percival Mackey
- Production company: Butcher's Film Service
- Distributed by: Butcher's Film Service
- Release date: 23 January 1944 (United Kingdom)
- Running time: 80 minutes
- Country: United Kingdom
- Language: English

It's in the Bag is a 1944 British comedy film directed by Herbert Mason and starring Elsie Waters, Doris Waters and Ernest Butcher. It was written by Con West, and produced and distributed by Butcher's Film Service. Gert and Daisy try to recover a valuable lost dress.

== Plot ==
Gert and Daisy are hard up, and to raise some cash sell a dress bequeathed to them by their grandmother. Too late, they realise the dress has £2000 hidden in it, and set about retrieving it from the buyer, a theatrical costumier. Their landlady's son, Joe, gets to hear about it and joins the chase to try and get his hands on the money.

== Cast ==
- Elsie Waters as Gert
- Doris Waters as Daisy
- Ernest Butcher as Sam Braithwaite
- Lesley Osmond as April Vaughan
- Gordon Edwards as Alan West
- Reginald Purdell as Joe
- Irene Handl as Mrs Beam
- Vera Bogetti as Rose Trelawney
- Megs Jenkins as Peach St. Clair
- Tony Quinn as Prendergast
- Anthony Holles as costumier

== Release ==
The film is listed on the BFI 75 Most Wanted list of lost films, but it was given a DVD commercial release by Renown Pictures Ltd in May 2014, although the Renown version is only 63 minutes long.

== Critical reception ==
Kinematograph Weekly called the film a "cheery low-life comedy extravaganza", adding: "Amusing and up-to-date, if sketchy, story, great team work of Elsie and Doris Waters, impressive staging, useful supporting cast, bright song numbers, good title.

Monthly Film Bulletin wrote: "A typically broad Waters Sisters farce which moves with immense speed from one fantastic episode to another. During the whole film, both Gert and Daisy are well up to their usual form, fooling and back-chatting, not to mention appearing as a supposedly tragic heroine and a little Lord Fauntleroy type of boy. They contribute, too, quite an attractive song. The rest of the cast, and particularly Ernest Butcher as an overwrought theatrical producer, aid and abet to the best of their ability."

In British Sound Films: The Studio Years 1928–1959 David Quinlan rated the film as "average", writing: "Slight story moved along at great speed, yet another variant on The 12 Chairs."
