= BFI 75 Most Wanted =

List of films

The BFI 75 Most Wanted is a list compiled in 2010 by the British Film Institute of the most sought-after British feature films not held in the BFI National Archive, and classified as "missing, believed lost". The films chosen range from quota quickies and B-movies to lavish prestige productions of their day. The list includes lost works by major directors and those featuring top-name actors; also films that were top box-office successes in their time but have since disappeared, and works that are believed to be historically significant for some aspect of style, technique, subject matter or innovation.

The earliest film on the list dates from 1913, the latest from 1983. The 1930s is the most represented decade with 24 entries, followed by the 1920s (16), and the 1940s (14). Maurice Elvey, with four films on the list, is the most represented director. The first film on the list is Alfred Hitchcock's 1926 feature The Mountain Eagle, described as "the Holy Grail of film historians".

Since 2012, the BFI has revealed that a number of the films on the list have been found. As of 2017, 18 of the 75 films have been found in their complete form; two others exist in shortened, retitled versions that were re-edited for the American market.

== Films ==
The BFI 75 Most Wanted List is divided into two headings: "The Ten Most Wanted", sorted in a chosen descending order of importance, and "The Rest", in no order of importance (as published, they are listed alphabetically). In the following tables, the top 10 films are numbered to reflect their order in the BFI's published list, with the remaining 65 following in chronological order of release.

=== The Ten Most Wanted ===
Films that have been found
Films that have significant segments or scenes still extant, or exist in cut versions, or in poor quality prints

#	Year	Title	Director	Notes
1	1926	The Mountain Eagle	Alfred Hitchcock	The only lost Hitchcock feature film (his short An Elastic Affair is also lost). One of the world's most sought-after lost films.
2	1931	Two Crowded Hours	Michael Powell	Powell's directorial debut, an unexpected box-office success
3	1943	Squadron Leader X	Lance Comfort	Extremely well-reviewed at the time of release, sought due to critical reassessment of Comfort's importance in British cinema history. Story by Emeric Pressburger.
4	1968	Sleep Is Lovely (aka, The Other People)	David Hart	Believed to be experimental in filming style, no evidence of screening to a trade or paying audience.
5	1973	Symptoms	José Ramón Larraz	British entry in the 1974 Cannes Film Festival. Also believed to circulate privately through bootlegs, but for many years the negatives remained missing. The film was obtained by February 2016 and has since been released on DVD.
6	1948	Somewhere in Politics	John E. Blakeley	Mancunian Films production starring Frank Randle. An 18-minute segment survives.
7	1929	The Last Post	Dinah Shurey	Solo directorial debut of Britain's only female film director of this period.
8	1960	Linda	Don Sharp	Teen-drama starring Carol White and Alan Rothwell. Originally shown on a double-bill with Saturday Night and Sunday Morning, the film has been rediscovered and was shown on Talking Pictures TV in August 2025.
9	1914	A Study in Scarlet	George Pearson	Earliest British Sherlock Holmes feature
10	1913	Maria Marten, or the Mystery of the Red Barn	Maurice Elvey	From first year of Elvey's directorial career. Dramatisation of the notorious Red Barn murder, filmed in the actual locations in which the events took place

=== The Rest ===
Films that have been found
Films that have significant segments or scenes still extant, or exist in cut versions, or in poor quality prints
Films that have been found and exist as complete 16mm or 35mm prints, but film prints are still missing from the BFI national archive.

Year	Title	Director	Notes
1916	Milestones	Thomas Bentley	Ambitious multi-generational family saga
1919	The First Men in the Moon	J. L. V. Leigh	First direct H. G. Wells film adaptation
1920	The Amazing Quest of Mr. Ernest Bliss	Henry Edwards	
1921	The Adventures of Mr. Pickwick	Thomas Bentley	Early Dickens adaptation
1921	The Narrow Valley	Cecil Hepworth	Starring Alma Taylor, highly praised for its location shots of the South Downs countryside
1923	Love, Life and Laughter	George Pearson	Acclaimed on release as "a screen classic" and "a masterpiece". On 2 April 2014 Dutch filmmuseum EYE reported that it had discovered a copy. Now in the BFI National Archive.
1923	Reveille	George Pearson	Socially significant World War I drama. Small segments believed to survive in private hands
1923	Woman to Woman	Graham Cutts	Hitchcock as assistant director and uncredited screenwriter
1924	Lily of the Alley	Henry Edwards	Experimental silent without use of intertitles
1924	Who Is the Man?	Walter Summers	Screen debut of John Gielgud
1926	London	Herbert Wilcox	Big-budget "Limehouse" picture starring Dorothy Gish
1926	Mademoiselle from Armentieres	Maurice Elvey	Highest-grossing British film of 1926. A little under one third is known to survive in fragments
1927	The Arcadians	Victor Saville	Curiosity as to how a silent version was made of a popular stage musical
1927	The Story of the Flag	Anson Dyer	First full-length British animation
1927	Tip Toes	Herbert Wilcox	Another Dorothy Gish vehicle, mauled by critics
1929	The Crooked Billet	Adrian Brunel	Starring Madeleine Carroll. May have been released in both silent and sound versions
1930	Lord Richard in the Pantry	Walter Forde	
1930	School for Scandal	Maurice Elvey	Only film shot in the abortive Raycol colour process. Only screened in black-and-white
1930	Too Many Crooks	George King	British film debut of Laurence Olivier
1931	Deadlock	George King	First British talkie to use a film set as its dramatic location.
1931	Hobson's Choice	Thomas Bentley	Conflicting reports as to whether George Formby appeared in this film
1931	Lloyd of the C.I.D.	Henry MacRae	12-part sound serial, the only such ever made in Britain not targeted at a juvenile audience. Known to have been extant in 1977, but has since proved untraceable
1932	Castle Sinister	Widgey R. Newman	Early British horror film, intriguing tagline "Mad doctor tries to put girl's brain into apeman's head"
1932	Men of Tomorrow	Leontine Sagan	Screen debut of Robert Donat
1933	Counsel's Opinion	Allan Dwan	Early Alexander Korda production
1933	Yes, Mr Brown	Jack Buchanan	Buchanan's first starring and directing role
1934	Badger's Green	Adrian Brunel	First production credit of Anthony Havelock-Allan
1934	The Path of Glory	Dallas Bower	Exceptionally sophisticated and polished quota quickie
1934	To Be a Lady	George King	Sound film starring silent cinema star Chili Bouchier
1935	Murder at Monte Carlo	Ralph Ince	Screen debut of Errol Flynn
1935	The Price of a Song	Michael Powell	One of Powell's most favourably reviewed quota quickies
1935	The Public Life of Henry the Ninth	Bernard Mainwaring	First-ever Hammer Films production
1936	Educated Evans	William Beaudine	Considered the best of Max Miller's films
1936	The Man Behind the Mask	Michael Powell	Powell's last quota quickie. A print of the American release, titled Behind the Mask, has been found, but it is a cut version of the original UK film.
1936	The Scarab Murder Case	Michael Hankinson	The only Philo Vance film made in Britain
1937	The Vulture	Ralph Ince	Last film directed by Ince before his death in a road accident
1938	The Viper	Roy William Neill	Sequel to The Vulture
1939	The Good Old Days	Roy William Neill	The only Max Miller film with a period setting
1939	Murder Will Out	Roy William Neill	Playing in cinemas at outbreak of World War II
1940	Dr. O'Dowd	Herbert Mason	Irish-set drama, screen debut of Peggy Cummins. Enthusiastically reviewed in Ireland ("a film about Ireland with a difference...no animals in the living rooms of the homes.")
1941	This Man Is Dangerous	Lawrence Huntington	The only missing James Mason film. Although it is said to have been shown on British television as recently as 1987, this is a false claim. Dubbed Italian copy traced.
1943	Deadlock	Ronald Haines	Convoluted thriller with John Slater in dual role as twins. It is now available on DVD.
1943	It's in the Bag	Herbert Mason	Popular Gert and Daisy slapstick comedy
1944	Kiss the Bride Goodbye	Paul L. Stein	Pre-stardom Jean Simmons role. The Huntley Film Archives states that it has "the whole film".
1944	Welcome, Mr. Washington	Leslie S. Hiscott	American soldiers in an English village. Rediscovered c. 2015. It was shown on the British TV channel Talking Pictures TV on 13 October 2020.
1945	Flight from Folly	Herbert Mason	First starring screen role of stage star Pat Kirkwood
1945	For You Alone	Geoffrey Faithfull	Lavish wartime melodrama, a huge box-office hit. A 16mm safety print appears in the UCLA Film and Television Archive's online search.
1945	The World Owes Me a Living	Vernon Sewell	Lost film from a re-evaluated director. The Library of Congress possesses "nitrate material". In 2020, the film was shown on Talking Pictures TV.
1948	Bless 'Em All	Robert Jordan Hill	Army comedy-musical, screen debut of Max Bygraves. A 2½-minute trailer survives, while a cut-down version titled Be Kind Sergeant turned up on eBay.
1948	But Not in Vain	Edmond T. Gréville	Tense World War II drama by increasingly studied director
1949	The Golden Madonna	Ladislao Vajda	Location-shot in Italy, starring Phyllis Calvert
1950	Double Confession	Ken Annakin	Peter Lorre's only non-Hitchcock British film. A DVD was released but is no longer available. A 35mm print exists in an independent archive in the UK.
1952	Hammer the Toff	Maclean Rogers	Two films based on the John Creasey character The Toff. Salute the Toff was released on DVD in November 2013 and Hammer the Toff in March 2016.
1952	Salute the Toff	Maclean Rogers	Two films based on the John Creasey character The Toff. Salute the Toff was released on DVD in November 2013 and Hammer the Toff in March 2016.
1953	Small Town Story	Montgomery Tully	Football thriller with appearances by Denis Compton and the Arsenal and Millwall football teams. Starring Donald Houston and Susan Shaw. Has now been found, restored and released on DVD.
1953	Three Steps in the Dark	Daniel Birt	Murder mystery starring Greta Gynt. It is in the collection of the National Film and Sound Archive in Australia.
1954	The Diamond	Montgomery Tully	The first British 3D film. According to BFI, however, it was shown only once in 3D, on 13 September 2006 in Hollywood. The first nearly five minutes can also be viewed on YouTube. The complete film is available on Amazon Prime.
1957	Alive on Saturday	Alfred Travers	Stars Guy Middleton and Patricia Owens. 'The BFI's Stills, Posters and Design collections holds two stills.'
1957	Second Fiddle	Maurice Elvey	Elvey's last film, it is now available on DVD.
1962	Crosstrap	Robert Hartford-Davis	Directorial debut, reportedly with exceptionally graphic violence for its time. The BFI reported that a black and white negative print of the film was discovered in the early 2010s and digitally scanned. It is now available for screening on the BFI player website, and has been shown several times on Talking Pictures TV.
1963	Farewell Performance	Robert Tronson	Murder mystery set in the pop world, with performances from Joe Meek acts including The Tornados and Heinz
1969	The Promise	Michael Hayes	The first time Russian playwright Aleksei Arbuzov allowed any of his works to be filmed. Stars Ian McKellen.
1971	Nobody Ordered Love	Robert Hartford-Davis	Following poor promotion and a critical panning, Hartford-Davis reportedly took back all prints and ordered them to be destroyed after his death.
1972	The Cherry Picker	Peter Curran	Mild sexploitation comedy with cast including Lulu, Spike Milligan, and Terry-Thomas. Believed to be still in private circulation via inferior quality bootleg copies, but original prints and negatives are missing.
1983	Where Is Parsifal?	Henri Helman	Cast includes Orson Welles, Tony Curtis, and Peter Lawford. Shown at 1984 Cannes Film Festival but withdrawn before scheduled UK release. Never publicly available in UK or US, the original English-language sources are missing. Director Helman donated "his personal 35mm print, with French subtitles" to the British Film Institute.

== See also ==
- List of lost films
