= Herbert Mason =

British film director and producer (1891–1960)

Herbert Mason MC
- Born: Samuel George Herbert Mason; 1891; Moseley, Birmingham, England
- Died: 20 May 1960 (aged 68–69); London, England
- Other names: Maj. Herbert Mason, Bertie, Garry, Werb
- Occupations: Film director; film producer; stage actor; army officer; stage manager; stage director; production manager; playwright
- Years active: 1933–1955
- Spouse: Daisy Fisher (m. 1914)
- Children: 2
- Parent(s): Samuel George Mason (father); Amy Mason (née Collins) (mother)
- Relatives: Edward Terry (uncle)
- Military career
- Service years: 1914–1918
- Rank: Major
- Units: 16th Battalion, Royal Warwickshire Regiment
- Conflicts: First World War: Battle of the Somme; Battle of Guillemont
- Awards: Military Cross

Samuel George Herbert Mason MC (1891 – 20 May 1960) was a British film director, producer, stage actor, army officer, presenter of some revues, stage manager, stage director, choreographer, production manager and playwright. He was a recipient of the Military Cross the prestigious award for "gallantry during active operations against the enemy." He received the gallantry award for his part in the Battle of Guillemont where British troops defeated the Germans to take the German stronghold of Guillemont.

Mason began his theatrical career at the age of 16 and appeared in several productions at the Birmingham Repertory Theatre including Barry Jackson's The Christmas Party. During the 1920s, he stage managed some of the largest shows in London, including many of André Charlot's musical revues, and began his film career with the arrival of sound in motion pictures. Mason was the assistant director for I Was a Spy, which was very successful at the box office and voted best film of the year. He made his debut as director in 1936 with The First Offence. His most prominent film was A Window in London, a dark thriller set in the London Underground, which was a remake of the original French drama film Metropolitan. Another successful film included Take My Tip, in which he directed Jack Hulbert, whose "dances [were] beautifully staged".

Several rising actors and actresses, including Vivien Leigh, made their film debuts in some of his films before they rose to prominence. He worked for several studios and production companies, including Gaumont British, Gainsborough Pictures, London Films and MGM-British Studios. Mason directed 16 films (from thrillers to comedies). He moved into producing for the rest of his career, and authored some plays with his wife, Daisy Fisher, a novelist and playwright, who also had a background in theatre.

His films were generally very well received, and some of them were marked out for the inventiveness of the plot, locations used for shooting and humour. Some of his films are remembered for introducing rising actors and actresses to the screen before they became famous.

== Early life ==
Samuel George Herbert Mason was born in 1891, in Moseley, Birmingham, the third of four children of Samuel George Mason (a brass founder at Samuel Mason Ltd) and Amy Mason (née Collins), and was a nephew by marriage of the famous Shakespearean actress Ellen Terry. His grandfather Samuel Mason was also a Brass Founder. The firm was originally called Mason and Lawley – makers of balance cocks for clock movement. It was later renamed Samuel Mason Ltd, specialising in bar equipment. Mason was educated at Solihull Grammar School and left aged 14. He was apprenticed in the family brass foundry prior to beginning his career as an actor in about 1907. He was a stage manager at the Palace Theatre and Birmingham Repertory Theatre (up to 1914), where he appeared in The Critic and The Christmas Party. Both the plays also starred Felix Aylmer and Frank Clewlow.

During the World War I, Mason was an officer in the Royal Warwickshire Regiment from 1914, and then in the Machine Gun Corps. He joined the army about two months after marrying a chorus girl Daisy Fisher. On 17 November 1914 he received his commission as a temporary Second Lieutenant. He rose to the rank of major and was awarded the Military Cross for his great personal outstanding gallantry when commanding the 59th brigade machine gun company at the taking of Guillemont during the Battle of the Somme. The report written on 7 September 1916 (from the Public Record Office and the National Archives in Kew) is Mason's description of the battle. The 59th machine gun company had 16 machine guns and about 170 men. About half the men died in the battle.

While his unit was waiting in line, he occupied himself doing a self-portrait using oil paints which, presumably, were left in the trench by a French officer. Mason served in the Royal Warwickshire Regiment with the brother of Michael Balcon. Balcon was to work with Mason as producer on The First Offence, I was a Spy and Take My Tip. Mason also served in the Machine Gun Corps with Clive Brook, who later became an actor and a friend. Mason spent the whole four years in the Western Front, and was awarded the Mons Star, the medal for those who participated on the conflict from the beginning.

== Career ==
=== Stage career in London (1918–27) ===
Mason resumed his career in the Theatre after the war. In the 1920s, he stage directed and stage managed many stage revues at Vaudeville Theatre including Yes! and Puppets! In 1921–22 Mason staged managed and starred in Pot Luck! with Beatrice Lillie, Herbert Mundin who is best known for his role as Much the Miller's Son in The Adventures of Robin Hood (1938). Mason also staged managed London Calling! a musical revue, which Fred Astaire assisted with the choreography. The play is famous for being Noël Coward's first publicly produced musical work. In 1924 Mason staged and choreographed The Punch Bowl, which starred Fisher and Eric Coates. In 1925, the play was later transferred to His Majesty's Theatre, London and Vaudeville Theatre. During the performance at Vaudeville Theatre he was one of the proprietors. After the production, the theatre was closed on 7 November 1925 and reconstructed. In 1925, he was an assistant producer for Still Dancing, and choreographed Bubbly, which was performed at the Duke of York's Theatre. In 1926, he produced Yvonne a successful musical comedy (staged by George Edwardes at Daly's Theatre, London). Mason choreographed Vaudeville Vanities, which was performed at the Vaudeville Theatre from 1926 to 1927 and went on tour at the Royal Theatre, Rochdale in 1929. In 1927 he presented, produced and starred (as Shipwright) in Daisy Fisher and Harold Simpson's The Cave Man.

=== Film career (1928–45) ===
Mason, George Arliss (middle) and Maude T. Howell (right) on the set of His Lordship in 1936

In 1928, with the arrival of sound, Mason began to make his mark in the film industry by presenting stage shows for the Gaumont – British cinema circuit. He respected and worked with Victor Saville on I Was a Spy (1933) as an assistant director. The producer, Michael Balcon, mentioned in his memoir, that he "told [Mason] to take the script [for I was a Spy] to Belgium, find Mrs McKenna, and get her to approve [the script] by page", and that Mason came back "with every page approved". Although it was very successful at the box office, Balcon was devastated he watched the completed film, but Mason reassured him that it was his "best to date." The film starred Herbert Marshall, who had previously had a role in Daisy Fisher's comedy Lavender Ladies. A few decades later, I was a Spy was shown at the National Film Theatre, London. The following year, Mason worked with Saville on Evergreen as a unit manager.

In 1936, he made his first film as director, The First Offence (Bad Blood), a spy thriller in which he directed the young John Mills. It was filmed in London and was inspired by Mauvaise Graine directed by Billy Wilder. He also directed the famous actor George Arliss just before Arliss retired from the stage. He directed a dozen engaging films, including a "diplomatic thriller", East Meets West. During filming for East Meets West a group of film extras went on strike, but Mason successfully ended it "by offering each extra an additional pound and a blanket". Dr Mitchell refused to allow Mason to direct Doctor Syn because Fisher had German measles, so Roy Neill replaced Mason.

In 1939, Mason directed The Silent Battle, a thriller set on the Orient Express. The film starred Rex Harrison and was the film debut of Megs Jenkins, who had a small role. She later had roles in It's in the Bag and John and Julie.

Mason changed his pace from perky musicals to dark drama with A Window in London (Lady in Distress) about a man who believes he has witnessed a murder from a passing train. However his films became lighter again including Back-Room Boy – a comedy set in a lighthouse starring Arthur Askey. Robert Murphy describes the film as "the funniest if the least original of the Askey comedies" in his book Realism and Tinsel. That view is shared with John Howard Reid, who mentions in his book that it "is also highly successful in delivering both laughs and thrills".

Additionally, Michael Hodgson mentions in his book that "A Window in London was a dark and disturbing remake of Maurice Cam's French circular drama Metropolitain." The film starred Michael Redgrave, who had previously played Christopher Drew in Fisher's comedy A Ship Comes Home at the St Martin's Theatre in May 1937.

Before World War II, Mason combined with some others to buy a country house, Cuffnells, the family home of Alice Liddell. They originally planned to convert it into an upmarket hotel, but when the war broke out in 1939, Cuffnells was requisitioned by the army. By the time the war ended it was in such poor condition that it had to be demolished. Filming for Dr. O'Dowd took place in the summer of 1939 and was completed after the war started. Dr. O'Dowd was the film debut for Peggy Cummins. The film was successful and described as "one of the best films of Ireland ever made." Felix Aylmer also appeared in Dr. O'Dowd, The Briggs Family and Once a Crook.

Mason, like Basil Rathbone and many others, offered his service in the war but was turned down because he was too old. However, he was awarded a medal for his services as a member of the Home Guard. Despite moving into film-making, Mason continued to work in the theatre on some occasions. In 1940, Mason presented Peril at End House, which was written by Arnold Ridley and performed at the Vaudeville Theatre. It was an adaptation of the book by Agatha Christie and was Isabel Dean's London debut. Two years later, he produced The Big Top, by Herbert Farjeon, which starred Beatrice Lillie, with whom Mason had previously appeared on stage.

During the war, while shooting the film A Yank in the RAF, a "British camera team [consisting of] (Ronald Neame, Jack Whitehead and Otto Kanturek [worked] under the direction of Mason to take footage of Spitfires being rearmed." With complete co-operation from the RAF, as well as extensive use of stock RAF footage, the studio was allowed to film actual battles shot by a camera equipped aircraft, an old Avro Anson, which was large enough to carry the camera team, although Mason did not fly with them. He was credited as Maj. Herbert Mason, the reason probably being that it would make the film more appealing to a wartime audience, since the film was about military service and was made by people who understood the forces.

Mason directed and produced the musical comedy Flight from Folly, which was his last directorial credit. It was also the last film made at Warner's Teddington Studios before it was bombed in 1944 and the film debut for Pat Kirkwood. In Italy, his career as director is known from only two films: East in Revolt (original title: His Lordship), an adventure film of 1936, and The Mystery Guest (original title: Strange Boarders) in 1938. After 1945, he moved into producing.

=== Rest of his career (1945–60) ===
After directing Flight from Folly, Mason joined London Films as an Associate Producer and produced some films with its founder Alexander Korda including Bonnie Prince Charlie and Anna Karenina. Mason and Daisy Fisher financed and were authors of the play of Lend Me Robin, which was performed in the Embassy Theatre, London from 5 October 1948 a few years before it was sold to the Central School of Speech and Drama. It was a comedy about a wife who tries to win back her philandering husband by taking a lover. The play starred Charles Goldner as the husband, Sonia Dresdel and William Mervyn. When it opened it did very well but then one reviewer came to the play drunk. He wrote an unpleasant review and it folded up after only three weeks. Three years later Mason and Fisher worked together on 'an eternal triangle Thriller Dangerous Woman' which was shown at Wimbledon Theatre. The play starred Thora Hird; the following year she had a role in Time Gentlemen Please! and later Background, both produced by Mason. Fisher also wrote the story for Things Are Looking Up, which Mason worked on as an Associate Producer. Vivien Leigh who is best known for her leading role in Gone with the Wind made her film debut in an uncredited role as a schoolgirl. Thirteen years later she appeared in Anna Karenina, which Mason also worked on as an associate producer.

Mason was with MGM and Fox British and produced several films with John Grierson's Group 3 Films at Southall Studios including Background (U.S Edge of Divorce) and Child's Play during the 50s. Another project as producer during that period included Lewis Gilbert's Cast a Dark Shadow.

Charles Allen Oakley says in his book that: "The post-war era ended for the British cinematograph industry almost indeterminately during 1952 and 1953." John and Julie a comedy produced by Mason in 1955 (two years after the Coronation) was about two children wanting to go to see the Coronation of Queen Elizabeth II. It is a moving snapshot of a war-weary country coming alive – an unrecognised classic and undiscovered sociological resource. He produced his last film – The Blue Peter, which was later retitled Navy Heroes, which was released in November 1955 (UK) and December 1957 (USA). The film is about youth seamanship at the original Outward Bound in Aberdyfi, Wales, a programme similar to Sea Scouting or Sea Cadets.

On 20 May 1960, Herbert Mason died in London at the age of 69.

== Personal life and family ==
Mason was known to his friends as 'Werb.' He was called "Bertie" by his family. His mother's brother was called Bertie Collins. Mason first met his future wife when they were both in a play about David Garrick with him taking the lead. Afterwards she and others called him 'Garry.'

Mason's family had lived in Birmingham for several generations (approximately from the end of the 18th Century). For a long time Mason's family worked at the brass foundry – a business, which Samuel Mason set up in the 1860s. In 1860 Thomas Lucas Birch and James Birch separated themselves from Yates and formed a partnership with Samuel Mason. Birch & Mason specialised in pewter goods and bar equipment. On 9 May 1862 the partnership was dissolved and Mason continued the business alone under Samuel Mason Ltd. However the firm competed with a rival firm Gaskell & Chambers until it faced bankruptcy in 1910. Gaskell and Chambers then purchased Mason's bar fitting trade however Harry Mason (Samuel Mason's son) who had been running Samuel Mason Ltd, restarted it under the name of Harry Mason Ltd from about 1910. It can be assumed that Harry Mason took over Samuel Mason Ltd after his nephew left to begin his career in the theatre. Today Harry Mason Ltd specialises in cellar equipment and beer.

In 1914, before the outbreak of the First World War, Mason married Daisy Fisher, a chorus girl, actress, lyricist and singer, who also had a background in theatre and became a novelist and playwright. She survived him with their daughter and son: Jocelyn Mason and Michael Mason (b. December 1924). Their son Michael Mason became a senior radio producer at the BBC.

Actor and theatre owner Edward Terry was a great-uncle.

Mason was a keen fisherman and very interested in birds. He was a good artist, and once did a self-portrait of himself as a clown during the First World War. He dressed very stylishly, getting many of his clothes from Hawes & Curtis. Through Billy Cotton, the band leader (a friend of his who was also an amateur racing driver), he took an active interest in cars and car racing. he was intrigued by any new mechanical device.

== Legacy ==
Currently Dr. O'Dowd, It's in the Bag and Flight from Folly are three of the BFI 75 Most Wanted Films (list of 75 most sought – after British Future films not currently held in the BFI National Archive). In May 2014 It's in the Bag was given a DVD commercial release by Renown Pictures Ltd however this version is 17 minutes shorter than the original version. In 2015, for the first time in 75 years, A Window in London was made available for viewing to a wider audience. It is included on Britain on Film via the BFI Player.

== Filmography ==
Year	Film	Director	Producer	Other	Notes
1933	I Was a Spy	Yes			Assistant director
1933	Friday the Thirteenth			Yes	Unit Manager
1933	Aunt Sally			Yes	United Production Manager, Released as Along Came Sally in USA
1934	Evergreen			Yes	Unit Manager
1935	Things Are Looking Up			Yes	Associate Producer
1936	The First Offence	Yes			His directorial debut
1936	His Lordship	Yes			Released as Man of Affairs in USA
1936	East Meets West	Yes			
1937	Take My Tip	Yes			
1938	Strange Boarders	Yes			
1939	The Silent Battle	Yes			Released as Continental Express in USA
1940	A Window in London	Yes			Released as Lady in Distress in USA
1940	Dr. O'Dowd	Yes			
1940	The Briggs Family	Yes			
1941	A Yank in the RAF			Yes	directed RAF flying sequences
1941	Mr. Proudfoot Shows a Light	Yes			Short film
1941	Fingers	Yes			
1941	Once a Crook	Yes			
1942	Back-Room Boy	Yes			
1943	The Night Invader	Yes			
1944	It's in the Bag	Yes			
1945	Flight from Folly	Yes	Yes		Last directorial credit and first film as producer
1948	Bonnie Prince Charlie		Yes		(uncredited)
1948	Anna Karenina			Yes	Associate Producer
1952	Time Gentlemen, Please!		Yes		
1953	Background		Yes		Released as Edge of Divorce in USA, July 1954
1954	Conflict of Wings		Yes		
1954	Child's Play		Yes		
1955	Cast a Dark Shadow		Yes		
1955	John and Julie		Yes		
1955	The Blue Peter		Yes		Released as Navy Heroes in USA, December 1957

== Stage ==
=== Stage appearances ===
Year	Title	Role	Director	Playwright(s)	Theatre
1913–14	The Critic			Richard Brinsley Sheridan	Birmingham Repertory Theatre
1914	The Christmas Party		Barry Jackson		Birmingham Repertory Theatre
1921	Pot Luck!			Ronald Jeans	Vaudeville Theatre, London
1927	The Cave Man	Shipwright		Daisy Fisher and Harold Simpson	Theatre Royal (first performance) and Savoy Theatre, London

=== Theatre ===
Year	Title	Theatre(s)	Stage manager	Stage director	Producer	Other	Notes
1912	The Follies	Apollo	Yes				
1920	The Shop Girl	Gaiety Theatre, London	Yes				
1921	Fun of the Fayre	London Pavilion	Yes				
1921	Pot Luck!	Vaudeville Theatre, London		Yes			
1922	London Calling!	Duke of York's Theatre, London	Yes				
1922	Snap	Vaudeville Theatre, London	Yes				
1923	Rats	Vaudeville Theatre, London	Yes		Yes		
1923	Yes!	Vaudeville Theatre, London		Yes			
1924	Puppets	Vaudeville Theatre, London		Yes			
1924	Our Cabaret	Victoria Palace Theatre, London			Yes	Yes	Presenter
1924–25	The Punch Bowl	Duke of York's Theatre, His Majesty's Theatre, London and Vaudeville Theatre, London	Yes			Yes	Choreographer and proprietor
1924–25	Charlot's Revue	Prince of Wales Theatre, London		Yes			
1925	Bubbly!	Duke of York's Theatre, London			Yes	Yes	Choreographer
1925–26	Still Dancing	London Pavilion			Yes		Assistant producer
1926–27	Yvonne	Dalys Theatre, London			Yes		
1926–27	Vaudeville Vanities	Vaudeville Theatre, London	Yes			Yes	Choreographer
1927	The Cave Man	Theatre Royal (first performance) and Savoy Theatre, London			Yes	Yes	Presenter
1940	Peril at End House	Vaudeville Theatre, London				Yes	Presenter
1942	The Big Top	His Majesty's Theatre, London			Yes		
1942	It's About Time	The Comedy Theatre, London			Yes		
1948	Lend Me Robin	Embassy Theatre, London			Yes	Yes	Playwright (with Daisy Fisher)
1951	Dangerous Woman	Wimbledon Theatre, London				Yes	Playwright (with Daisy Fisher)

== See also ==
- Moseley
- BFI 75 Most Wanted
- List of Gainsborough Pictures films
- List of people from Birmingham

== Bibliography ==
=== Primary sources ===
- Mason, Samuel George Herbert. (7 September 1916). Report by O.C. 59th M.G.Coy. Public Record Office, The National Archives in Kew
- "No. 29094". The London Gazette. 9 March 1915. pp. 2369–2369.
- "No. 29824". The London Gazette. 14 November 1916. pp. 11060–11060.

=== Secondary sources ===
- Aldgate, Anthony and Richards, Jeffrey. (2007). Britain Can Take It: The British Cinema in the Second World War. 2nd edition. I.B.Tauris & Co Ltd
- American Film Institute. (1999). AFI American Film Catalogue of Motion Pictures Produced in the United States. University of California Press
- Arliss, George. (1940). George Arliss. John Murray
- Balcon, Michael. (1969). Michael Balcon Presents...A Lifetime of Films. Hutchinson
- Blum, Daniel. (1955). Screen World Volume 6. Biblo & Tannen Publishers
- British Film and Television Yearbook. (1958). British and American Film Press
- Fells, Robert M. (2004). George Arliss: The Man Who Played God. Scarecrow Press
- Hobson, Harold. (1950). Theatre – Volume 2. Longmans, Green and Co
- Hodgson, Michael. (2013). Patricia Roc: the goddess of the Odeons. Author House
- Howard Reid, John. (2006). America's Best, Britain's Finest: A Survey of Mixed Movies. Lulu.com
- Howard Reid, John. (2010). British Movie Entertainments on VHS and DVD: A Classic Movie Fan’s Guide. Lulu.com
- Howard Reid, John. (2005). Hollywood's Miracles of Entertainment. Lulu.com
- Kemp, Thomas C. (1943). The Birmingham Repertory Theatre: The Playhouse and the Man. Cornish Brothers Limited
- McFarlane, Brian. (2005). The Encyclopedia of British Film. Methuen (2nd edition)
- Mackenzie, S.P. (2001). British War Films 1939–1945. Hambledon and London
- Moseley, Roy. (2000). Evergreen: Victor Saville in His Own Words. Southern Illinois University Press
- Murphy, Robert. (1989). Realism and Tinsel: Cinema and Society in Britain, 1939 – 1949. Routledge
- Murphy, Robert. (2006). Directors in British and Irish Cinema: A Reference Companion. BFI
- Neale, Steve. (2012). The Classical Hollywood Reader. Routledge
- Neame, Ronald. (2003). Straight from the Horse's Mouth. Rowman & Littlefield
- Oakley, Charles Allen. (2013). Where We Came In: Seventy Years of the British Film Industry. Routledge
- Quinlan, David. (1984). British Sound Films: The Studio Years 1928–1959. BT Batsford Ltd
- Quinlan, David. (1999). Quinlan's Film Directors. BT Batsford Ltd (2nd edition)
- Richards, Jeffrey. (2009). The Age of the Dream Palace: Cinema and Society in 1930s Britain. I.B.Tauris Publishers
- Shill, Ray. (2006). Workshop of the World: Birmingham's Industrial Legacy. The History Press
- Wearing, J.P. (2014). The London Stage 1920 – 1929: A Calendar of Productions, Performers and Personnel. Rowman & Littlefield Education (2nd edition)
- Wearing, J.P. (2014). The London Stage 1940 – 1949: A Calendar of Productions, Performers and Personnel. Rowman & Littlefield Publishers (2nd edition)
- (1946). The Illustrated London News, Volume 209. Issues 5594–5619. Illustrated London News & Sketch Limited
