= Anna Karenina (1948 film) =

1948 film by Julien Duvivier

- Theatrical release poster (France)
- Directed by: Julien Duvivier
- Written by: Julien Duvivier; Jean Anouilh; Guy Morgan
- Based on: Anna Karenina; 1878 novel) by Leo Tolstoy
- Produced by: Alexander Korda
- Starring: Vivien Leigh; Ralph Richardson; Kieron Moore
- Cinematography: Henri Alekan
- Edited by: Russell Lloyd
- Music by: Constant Lambert
- Production company: London Films
- Distributed by: British Lion Films (UK)
- Release dates: 22 January 1948 (London, premiere); 27 September 1948 (UK)
- Running time: 139 minutes
- Country: United Kingdom
- Language: English
- Budget: £700,000 or £553,000
- Box office: £149,414 (UK) or £159,000

Anna Karenina is a 1948 British period romantic drama film directed by Julien Duvivier, from a screenplay he co-wrote with Jean Anouilh and Guy Morgan, based on the 1878 novel by Leo Tolstoy. It stars Vivien Leigh in the title role, along with Ralph Richardson, Kieron Moore, and Sally Ann Howes. It was produced by Alexander Korda (with Herbert Mason as associate producer) for his company, London Films, and distributed in the UK by British Lion Films.

== Plot ==
Anna Karenina is married to Alexei Karenin, a cold government official in St Petersburg who is apparently more interested in his career than in satisfying the emotional needs of his wife. Called to Moscow by her brother Stepan Oblonsky, a reprobate who has been unfaithful to his trusting wife Dolly once too often, Anna meets Countess Vronsky on the night train to Moscow. They discuss their sons, with the Countess showing Anna a picture of her son Count Vronsky, a cavalry officer.

Vronsky shows up at the train to meet his mother, and is instantly infatuated with Anna. He boldly makes his interest known to her, which Anna demurely pushes away – but not emphatically so. At a grand ball, Vronsky continues to pursue the married Anna, much to the delight of the gossiping spectators. But Kitty Shcherbatsky, Dolly's sister who is smitten with Vronsky, is humiliated by his behaviour and leaves the ball – much to the distress of Konstantin Levin, a suitor of Kitty's who was rejected by her in favour of Vronsky. However, after a change of heart, Kitty marries Levin.

Boldly following Anna back to St Petersburg, Vronsky makes it known to society that he is the companion of Anna – a notion she does nothing to stop. Soon, society is whispering about the affair, and it's only a matter of time before Karenin learns of the relationship. Outwardly more worried about his social and political position than his wife's passion, he orders her to break off with Vronsky or risk losing her son. She tries, but cannot tear herself away from Vronsky.

Leaving Karenin, Anna becomes pregnant with Vronsky's child. Almost dying in childbirth (the child is stillborn), Anna begs Karenin for forgiveness, which he coldly grants. Karenin, being magnanimous, allows Vronsky the notion that he may visit Anna if she calls for him. Embarrassed by the scandal, Vronsky tries to shoot himself, but fails.

Anna tries again to live with Karenin, but cannot get Vronsky out of her head. She leaves Karenin for good, abandoning her child to live in Italy with Vronsky. But her doubts over Vronsky's feelings for her grow, and she eventually pushes him away. Realizing that she has lost everything, Anna walks onto the railway tracks and commits suicide by letting the train hit her.

== Cast ==
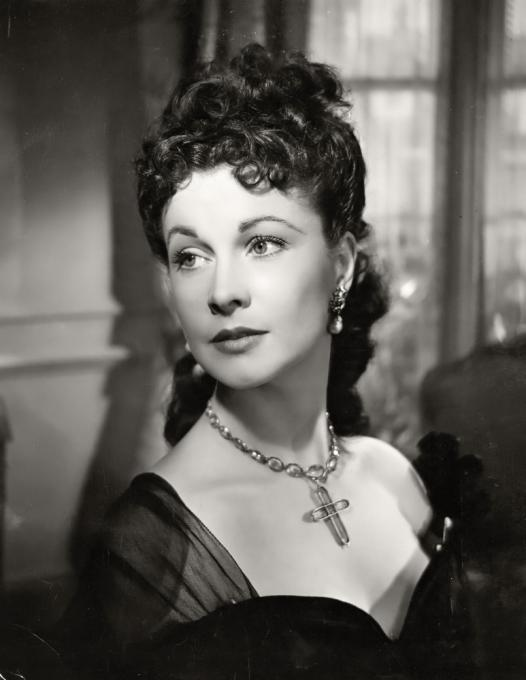
Vivien Leigh as Anna Karenina

- Vivien Leigh as Anna Karenina
- Ralph Richardson as Alexei Karenin
- Kieron Moore as Count Vronsky
- Hugh Dempster as Stefan Oblonsky
- Mary Kerridge as Dolly Oblonsky
- Marie Lohr as Princess Shcherbatsky
- Frank Tickle as Prince Schcherbatsky
- Sally Ann Howes as Kitty Shcherbatsky
- Niall MacGinnis as Konstantin Levin
- Bernard Rebel as Professor Leverrin
- Michael Gough as Nicholai
- Martita Hunt as Princess Betty Tversky
- Heather Thatcher as Countess Lydia Ivanovna
- Helen Haye as Countess Vronsky
- Michael Medwin as Kitty's doctor
- Gino Cervi as Enrico
- Beckett Bould as Matvey
- Leslie Bradley as Korsunsky
- Therese Giehse as Marietta
- John Longden as General Serpuhousky
- Mary Matlew as Princess Nathalia
- Valentina Murch as Annushka
- Judith Nelmes as Miss Hull
- Ruby Miller as Countess Meskov
- John Salew as Lawyer
- Patrick Skipwith as Sergei
- Ann South as Princess Sorokina
- Jeremy Spenser as Giuseppe
- Austin Trevor as Colonel Vronsky
- Gus Verney as Prince Makhotin

This was the film debut for Michael Gough, Barbara Murray and Maxine Audley.

== Production ==
Michael Redgrave was to play the male lead but elected to accept a Hollywood offer instead. Vivien Leigh previously had an uncredited role as a schoolgirl extra in Things Are Looking Up, which Herbert Mason worked on as an associate producer.

Filming started on 15 April 1947. Shooting took place primarily at Shepperton Studios, though the racetrack and steeplechase scenes were filmed in Monterey, California. The film features decors by André Andrejew and deep focus cinematography by Henri Alekan.

== Release ==
The film was distributed in the United Kingdom by British Lion Films and distributed in the United States by 20th Century Fox. It was picketed at some American by members of the anti-British organisation known as the Sons of Liberty, as part of that pro-Zionist group's protests against British films, in connection with events in Mandatory Palestine.

== Reception ==
=== Box office ===
As of 30 June 1949 the film earned £135,341 in the UK of which £95,687 went to the producer. The film had made a loss of £457,313 for the company.

=== Critical response ===
Critic James Agee writing in The Nation in 1948 was not enthusiastic: "Vivien Leigh is lashed about by the tremendous role of Anna like a pussy cat with a tigress by the tail. She is not assisted by a script which insists on sentimentally ennobling one of fiction's most vehemently average women." Leonard Maltin wrote, "Despite its stellar cast, this is a mostly turgid adaptation of the Tolstoy classic ... " Leslie Halliwell gave it one of four stars: "Tiresomely overlong but very handsomely staged remake marred by central miscasting."
