= Follow Your Star =

1938 film

- Directed by: Sinclair Hill
- Written by: Sinclair Hill; Arthur Tracy; Stafford Dickens; George Pearson
- Produced by: Harcourt Templeman
- Starring: Arthur Tracy; Belle Chrystall; Mark Daly; Horace Hodges
- Cinematography: Cyril Bristow
- Music by: Bretton Byrd
- Production company: Belgrave Films
- Distributed by: General Film Distributors
- Release date: July 1938
- Running time: 80 minutes
- Country: United Kingdom
- Language: English

Follow Your Star is a 1938 British musical film directed by Sinclair Hill and starring Arthur Tracy, Belle Chrystall and Mark Daly. It was written by Hill, Arthur Tracy, Stafford Dickens and George Pearson It was made at Pinewood Studios.

== Plot ==
Arthur Tee has ambitions for the theatre and quits his factory job for chorus work. After failing to make an impression he is reduced to singing on the streets. When a BBC mobile unit captures his voice, he finds overnight fame, and gets a part in a West End musical show.

== Cast ==
- Arthur Tracy as Arthur Tee
- Belle Chrystall as Mary
- Mark Daly as Shorty
- Horace Hodges as Mr. Wilmot
- Nina Boucicault as Mrs Tee
- James Harcourt as Mr Tee
- Dick Tubb as Freddy
- Finlay Currie as Maxie

== Reception ==
The Monthly Film Bulletin wrote: "The direction is unspectacular but quietly efficient. Arthur Tracy puts over his songs very well in his popular 'street singer' manner. His diction is less pleasant to listen to, and his acting powers are limited, but a capable supporting cast helps him out. Belle Chrystall is an attractive heroine; Nina Boucicault a typical and charming stage mother; Horace Hodges is well cast as a benevolent theatre owner; and Mark Daly supplies welcome comedy relief as a bungling manager."

Kine Weekly wrote: "Pleasing romantic comedy-drama, adroitly decorated with the appealing vocalism of Arthur Tracy. Slight in plot, but showmanlike in presentation, it distributes entertainment of likeable variety over its not too prodigious footage. The star receives more than adequate support, while no fault can be found with the production qualities."
