= The Briggs Family =

1940 British film by Herbert Mason

- Director Herbert Mason (right) on set with the actors
- Directed by: Herbert Mason
- Written by: Brock Williams; John Dighton
- Produced by: A.M.Salomon
- Starring: Edward Chapman; Felix Aylmer; Jane Baxter; Oliver Wakefield; Austin Trevor
- Cinematography: Basil Emmott
- Music by: Bretton Byrd
- Production company: Warner Bros
- Distributed by: Warner Bros
- Release date: 7 September 1940 (United Kingdom)
- Running time: 69 minutes
- Country: United Kingdom
- Language: English
- Budget: £17,602
- Box office: £14,188

The Briggs Family is a 1940 British second feature ('B') drama film directed by Herbert Mason and starring Edward Chapman, Felix Aylmer, Jane Baxter, Oliver Wakefield and Austin Trevor. It was written by Brock Williams and John Dighton.

== Plot ==
During the Second World War, a special constable and former solicitor is called upon to defend his son who is accused of the theft of a car.

== Cast ==
- Edward Chapman as Charley Briggs
- Jane Baxter as Sylvia Briggs
- Oliver Wakefield as Ronnie Perch
- Austin Trevor as John Smith
- Mary Clare as Mrs Briggs
- Peter Croft as Bob Briggs
- Glynis Johns as Shelia Briggs
- Lesley Brook as Alice
- Felix Aylmer as Mr Sand
- Jack Melford as Jerry Tulse
- George Carney as George Downing
- Muriel George as Mrs Brokenshaw
- Aubrey Mallalieu as Milward
- Esma Cannon as Myrtle
- Joss Ambler as prosecutor
- Kitty de Legh as Mary Grayson
- Ian Fleming as Air Vice Marshal
- Vincent Holman as Inspector
- Hamilton Keene as Detective Sergeant Harper
- Pat McGrath as Herbert Lane
- Wilfrid Hyde-White as man with moustache at party (uncredited)

== Sequels ==
Due to the criticism of the characters not being true to life plans to make further sequels and a series of 'Briggs' films were dropped.

== Reception ==
The Monthly Film Bulletin wrote: "The film is not successful in making one interested in the Briggs family. Bob and his set behave so incredibly that the climax of the trial loses its effect. Edward Chapman makes a real personality of Mr. Briggs but the rest are stock types and not individuals."

Kine Weekly wrote: "The first half is fairly entertaining, but of no vital account. Full drama is awakened, of course, when Mr. Briggs has to apprehend his son. From thence on the picture comes into its own, and it holds the emotions in a firm grip until it culminates in the shrewdly presented and handled court scene. Belated as this is, the film is, on the whole, good comedy melodrama."
