= Flight from Folly =

- Trade advertisement
- Directed by: Herbert Mason
- Written by: Lesley Storm; Katherine Strueby; Edmund Goulding; Basil Woon
- Produced by: Herbert Mason
- Starring: Pat Kirkwood; Hugh Sinclair
- Cinematography: Otto Heller
- Music by: Benjamin Frankel; Eric Spear; Edmundo Ros
- Production company: Warner Bros.
- Distributed by: Warner Brothers; First National Pictures
- Release date: 21 May 1945 (United Kingdom)
- Running time: 94 minutes
- Country: United Kingdom
- Language: English
- Budget: £139,921
- Box office: £77,096

Flight from Folly is a lost 1945 British musical comedy film directed and produced by Herbert Mason, in his last directorial credit before moving onto production, for Warner Bros. The cast includes Pat Kirkwood, Hugh Sinclair and Tamara Desni, with music from Edmundo Ros and the Rumba Band. An unemployed showgirl impersonates a nurse and undertakes the job of looking after a composer and playwright abandoned by his Russian wife. The story was written by Lesley Storm, Katherine Strueby and Edmund Goulding. The film was distributed by Warner Brothers and First National Pictures.

== Preservation status ==
The British Film Institute has classed Flight from Folly as a lost film, listed as one of its 75 Most Wanted lost films. The BFI National Archive holds a collection and stills but no film or video materials.

== Plot ==
When his muse and girlfriend Nina takes off with a continental lothario, composer and playwright Clinton Clay is devastated and turns to drink for solace. His doctor tries, with the help of Clinton's butler Neville, to get him to pull himself together but all attempts fail as Clinton's behaviour becomes ever more unbalanced and every nurse they engage is sent on her way by him in quick order.

Showgirl Sue Brown is currently out of work, hears of Clinton's problems and poses as a nurse. She is taken on to be his keeper, and manages to placate him to the extent that he does not dismiss her. When Clinton decides to travel to Majorca in pursuit of Nina, Sue is included in the party along with Neville and Clinton's sculptor sister Millicent. Harriet, a devious widow with designs on Clinton, follows them to Majorca.

Once on the island, Clinton tracks Nina down and asks her to star in a tryout of a new musical he has written. She agrees, and Clinton makes arrangements to stage the musical there. On opening night however, the jealous Harriet locks Nina in her dressing room and disappears with the key. Sue offers to take Nina's place on stage, and proves to be a huge success with the audience. Clinton realises that he has fallen in love with her and is instantly cured of his malaise, happy now to let Nina go with her playboy lover.

== Cast ==
- Pat Kirkwood as Sue Brown
- Hugh Sinclair as Clinton Gray
- Tamara Desni as Nina
- Sydney Howard as Dr. Wylie
- Jean Gillie as Millicent
- A. E. Matthews as Neville
- Charles Goldner as Ramon
- Marian Spencer as Harriet
- Leslie Bradley as Bomber
- Edmundo Ros as himself

== Production ==
It was the last film made at Warner's Teddington Studios before it was bombed in 1944.

Kirkwood had appeared in minor roles in four films between 1938 and 1940 before focussing her career on the West End stage, where she had become a major star during the war years. Flight from Folly was designed to give Kirkwood her first starring screen role, with the hope of breaking her out as a big-name film attraction.

== Release ==
Flight from Folly was released to cinemas in the United Kingdom on 21 May 1945.

== Reception ==
The Monthly Film Bulletin wrote: "This is a frivolous and lively sort of film, elaborately conceived and produced. Pat Kirkwood throws herself wholeheartedly into playing the part of Sue, and acts, sings and dances pleasingly. Hugh Sinclair, too, as the neurotic Clinton Clay, gives an amusing performance. It is a pity, however, that Sydney Howard is relegated to so small a part. In one or two typical flashes he shows what he could have done were he given the chance."

Kine Weekly wrote: "Nimble, lavishly mounted musical frolic, presented in the wnique form of a crazy page from a psychiatrist's notebook, telling how a fresh face and figure rehabilitate a lovelorn, alcoholic genius of the theatre. The story, or rather chain of gags, is extremely well played by Pat Kirkwood, who is certainly up to Hollywood standard, and Hugh Sinclair, and given expensive and colourful backgrounds and tuneful songs. Disarmingly daffy, it is jolly, carefree, escapist entertainment. Very good British light booking for the masses, family and troops."

The Daily Film Renter wrote: "Musical, romance and comedy mingled in smartly paced subject revolving round world-famous composer–impresario–playwright–playboy. Catchy numbers presented with a swing, glittering chorus ensembles and good dancing. Acting throughout is polished and the whole does credit to Herbert Mason's direction. Excellent light entertainment for all."

The Daily Mail described the film as "a tremulous but definite step towards a school of British Musicians."

The Manchester Guardian called the film "unworthy of [Kirkwood's] limited but genuine talent" which "promises better work in better films".

The Daily Mirror however found the film a "neatly made and tuneful comedy" with praise for Kirkwood's "vivacious personality and talent".

The film's set designs, costuming and make-up provoked criticism from a number of reviewers.

The film lost over £60,000.

== See also ==
- List of lost films
