= Mauvaise Graine =

- Promotional release poster
- Directed by: Billy Wilder; Alexander Esway
- Written by: Billy Wilder; Jan Lustig; Max Colpet; Claude-André Puget
- Produced by: Edouard Corniglion-Molonier; Georges Bernier
- Starring: Danielle Darrieux
- Cinematography: Paul Cotteret; Maurice Delattre
- Edited by: Therese Sautereau
- Music by: Franz Waxman; Allan Gray
- Production company: Compagnie Nouvelle Commerciale
- Distributed by: Pathé Consortium Cinéma
- Release date: 1934
- Running time: 77 minutes
- Country: France
- Language: French

Mauvaise Graine (English: Bad Seed) is a 1934 French action comedy directed by Billy Wilder (in his directorial debut) and Alexander Esway. The screenplay by Wilder, Jan Lustig, Max Colpet, and Claude-André Puget focuses on a wealthy young playboy who becomes involved with a gang of car thieves.

Although Wilder and Esway shared the directing credit, in later years leading lady Danielle Darrieux recalled Esway had been involved with the project in some capacity but clearly remembered she had never seen him on the set. It was remade in Britain in 1936 as the film The First Offence starring John Mills and Lilli Palmer. It was later remade in France as the 1950 film The Unexpected Voyager.

== Plot ==
Set in 1930s Paris, the story centers on Henri Pasquier, whose wealthy father announces he no longer will support his playboy lifestyle. Dr. Pasquier sells his son's beloved Buick roadster, which Henri later sees parked on a street with the keys left in the ignition by the new owner. Unable to resist temptation, he takes the car to keep a date with a young lady he recently has met.

Henri is followed by three men who overtake him and bring him to the service station that serves as the front for a gang of car thieves. Believing he is one of them, they warn him not to compete with their operation. At the garage, Henri is introduced to the childlike Jean-la-Cravate—so called because he steals everyone's ties --, who invites him to stay at his flat with him and his sister Jeannette, who lures men away from their expensive cars so her brother's fellow henchmen can steal them—and who turns out to be the woman he dated at the start of the film. Jean convinces Henri to join his gang, and he and Jeannette soon are engaging in a series of daring thefts. When they manage to steal three luxury Hispano-Suizas, Henri insists everyone be entitled to better compensation, and the gang leader grudgingly agrees.

Perceiving Henri and Jeannette to be troublemakers, the leader sends them to Marseille in a car with a damaged front axle, hoping it will crack and crash, killing the two. It does crash, but the couple escape without injury. They decide to sail to Casablanca and begin a new life, but Jeannette refuses to leave without her brother. Henri returns to Paris to retrieve him, only to arrive at the garage in the middle of a raid. Jean is shot and seriously injured, and Henri brings him to his father for medical treatment, but he dies. Dr. Pasquier, anxious to help his son escape a life of crime, gives him money so Henri and Jeannette can sail off and start anew.

== Cast ==
- Danielle Darrieux as Jeannette
- Pierre Mingand as Henry Pasquier
- Raymond Galle as Jean-la-Cravate
- Jean Wall as Le zèbre
- Paul Escoffier as Le docteur Pasquier
- Michel Duran as Le chef
- Maupi as l'homme-au-Panama
- G. Heritier as Gaby
- Paul Velsa as l'homme-aux-cacahuètes
- Georges Malkine as Le secrétaire

== Production ==
When Billy Wilder arrived in Paris from Berlin on March 1, 1933, he settled in the Hotel Ansonia, a haven for members of the German film industry who had fled from their homeland to escape the encroaching threat of Adolf Hitler and the Nazi Party. Among those living there were actor Peter Lorre, composers Franz Waxman and Friedrich Hollaender, and screenwriters Jan Lustig and Max Colpet, who agreed to help Wilder develop a plot he had conceived in Berlin. In order to secure financing from a producer, they needed someone with directing credits to join their project, and Alexander Esway accepted their invitation.

Without making specific reference to the extent of Esway's participation in the film, Wilder later recalled, "I directed out of pure necessity and without any experience. I cannot say that I had any fun making Mauvaise Graine . . . There was pressure. People depend on you, and you aren't really in control, but you can't show that, or everyone gets nervous . . . I, alone, was responsible for everything - everything! I had to be everybody from the producer to script girl. I was an extra, not because I was trying to pull a Hitchcock, but because we couldn't afford another body." Budget constraints required the director to make use of whatever locations were available to him. "We didn't use a soundstage. Most of the interiors were shot in a converted auto shop, even the living room set, and we did the automobile chases without transparencies, live, on the streets. It was exhausting. The camera was mounted on the back of a truck or in a car. We were constantly improvising . . . We were doing nouvelle vague a quarter of a century before they invented a fancy name for it."

Much of the film is silent, with long sequences punctuated by a jazz-infused score by Franz Waxman and Allan Gray.

Mauvaise Graine proved to be Wilder's last European film. By the time it premiered in the summer of 1934, he had relocated to Hollywood, although he recalled, "I still didn't think of myself as a director, not exactly. I wasn't certain I liked being a director, but I did know I could do it. That was satisfying." It would be eight years before he would direct again, making the 1942 comedy The Major and the Minor after establishing himself as a successful screenwriter.

== Home media ==
Image Entertainment released the film on Region 1 DVD on November 26, 2002, with English subtitles. The sole bonus feature is Joie de Vivre, an animated short subject released the same year as Mauvaise Graine.

Flicker Alley released the film on Blu-Ray on November 24, 2023. The disc is titled French Revelations and also contains the 1935 French comedy feature film Fanfare of Love, which later inspired Wilder's Some Like It Hot.
