= I Was a Spy =

1933 film

- Theatrical release poster
- Directed by: Victor Saville
- Screenplay by: Ian Hay; W. P. Lipscomb; Edmund Gwenn
- Based on: I Was a Spy by Marthe Cnockaert
- Produced by: Michael Balcon
- Starring: Madeleine Carroll; Herbert Marshall; Conrad Veidt
- Cinematography: Charles Van Enger
- Edited by: Frederick Y. Smith
- Music by: Louis Levy (music director)
- Production company: Gaumont British Picture Corporation
- Distributed by: Woolf & Freedman Film Service (UK); Fox Film Corporation (USA)
- Release dates: 4 September 1933 (UK); 15 December 1933 (USA)
- Running time: 89 minutes
- Country: United Kingdom
- Language: English
- Budget: $200,000-$300,000

I Was a Spy is a 1933 British thriller film directed by Victor Saville and produced by Michael Balcon. It stars Madeleine Carroll as Marthe Cnockaert, Herbert Marshall, and Conrad Veidt. Based on the 1932 memoir I Was a Spy by Marthe Cnockaert, the film is about her experiences as a Belgian woman who nursed German soldiers during World War I while passing intelligence to the British. The film was produced by Gaumont British Picture Corporation with Woolf & Freedman Film Service and Fox Film Corporation distributing in the United Kingdom and the United States respectively.

== Plot ==
In German-occupied Belgium in 1914, a local woman nurses injured German soldiers while passing information to the British.

== Cast ==
- Madeleine Carroll as Marthe Cnockaert
- Herbert Marshall as Stephan
- Conrad Veidt as Commandant Oberaertz
- Edmund Gwenn as Burgomaster
- Gerald du Maurier as Doctor
- Donald Calthrop as Cnockhaert
- May Agate as Madame Cnockhaert
- Eva Moore as Canteen Ma
- Martita Hunt as Aunt Lucille
- Nigel Bruce as Scottie
- George Merritt as Captain Reichmann
- Anthony Bushell as Otto

== Production ==
Filming took place in Shepherds Bush. Producer Michael Balcon was concerned about potential legal troubles with the film after the case involving Felix Yusupov, MGM and the film Rasputin and the Empress. Balcon sent Herbert Mason (who was initially production manager before becoming an assistant director) to take the script to Belgium and give it to Marthe Cnockaert to look at and sign off on every page. Balcon called the movie "the most ambitious we had so far attempted."

The script was co-written by Edmund Gwenn who also portrayed the burgomaster.

== Release ==
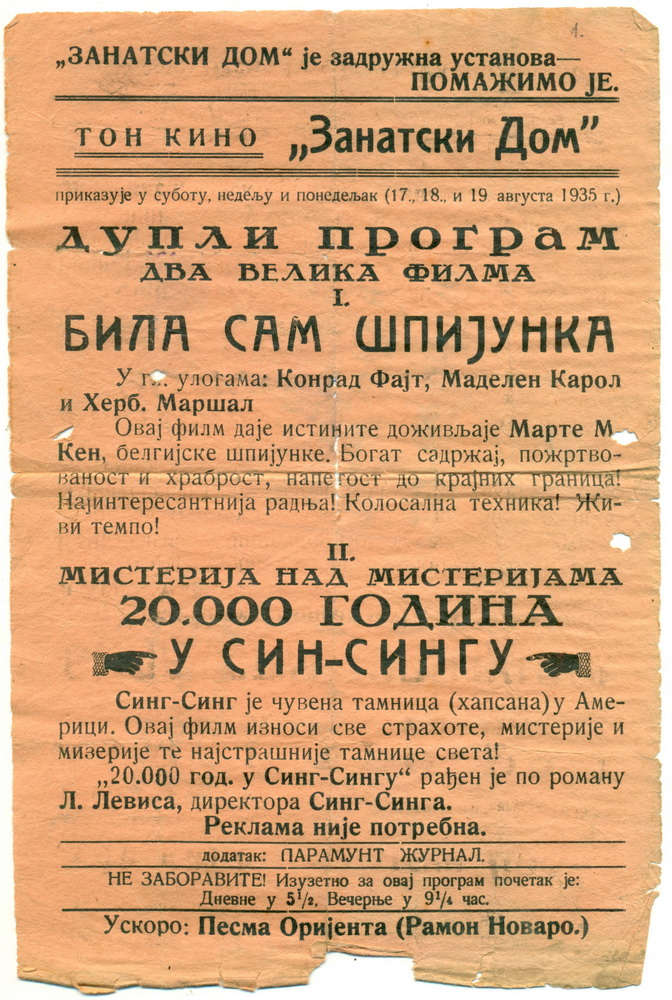
1935: Flyer for I Was a Spy playing in a local cinema in Prilep, Macedonia (Kingdom of Yugoslavia)

I Was a Spy was also the first film dubbed in Poland (while there were earlier examples of films dubbed in Polish, they were recorded in Paramount studio in Joinville, France), released in 1935 as Siostra Marta jest szpiegiem, starring Lidia Wysocka as Martha Cnockhaert's voice.

== Reception ==
=== Box office ===
The film was very successful at the box office. In January 1934 when discussing the box office success of British movies over the previous year, Variety stated "probability is the English gross record will be split between Henry VIII and I Was a Spy."

=== Critical reception ===
The Daily Mail (21 November 1933) described it as "the most splendid film produced in this country." The Daily Despatch (21 November 1933) described it as a film "equal to Hollywood's best." Variety and motion picture critic Mordaunt Hall (for The New York Times) praised Carroll's acting.Variety also wrote "The producers of this picture set out to turn out a super film. Money was lavishly and intelligently spent. Subject has great merit and would have a chance in the States."

The Evening News (Rockhampton), praised the acting and described it as "[spectacular] in its sweep, human in its emotions, dramatic in its intensity and profoundly gripping in its appeal."

The film was panned by critic William Troy in The Nation for glossing over the realities of war and the hundreds of deaths caused by this spy. In his review, he compared it to general war propaganda saying, "It is the kind of picture calculated to make us believe that there is something beautiful and touching about war, after all." Film historian and critic Paul Rotha for Cinema Quarterly also disliked the film highlighting how the causes of the war are completely ignored and said, "I raise my hat to Gaumont for attempting a film of serious stature, but replace it when I see the spirit in which the deed is done."

Saville's also had doubts about the film. He watched the completed I Was a Spy with one of the Assistant Directors, Herbert Mason, and was devastated: however, Mason reassured him that it was his "best to date."

Halliwell's Film & Video Guide described the film as "[good] standard war espionage melodrama."

Adrian Turner for Radio Times said that, "Fans of vintage British cinema will enjoy this sprightly espionage yarn, set during the First World War and bearing a close resemblance to the Mata Hari legend."

In 2021, film critic and author Derek Winnert praised the cast and their performances.

=== Accolades ===
In a poll conducted by the magazine Film Weekly, the film was voted the best British movie of 1933, and Madeleine Carroll's performance was voted the best in a British movie.

== Home media ==
I Was a Spy was released on DVD on 19 May 2014.

== Bibliography ==
=== Primary sources ===
- Film Weekly, 4 May 1934, p. 9
- Daily Despatch, 21 November 1933
- Daily Mail, 21 November 1933
- The Sun (Sydney), 13 May 1934
- The Evening News (Rockhampton), 30 May 1934

=== Secondary sources ===
- Balcon, Michael. (1969). Michael Balcon Presents...A Lifetime of Films. Hutchinson & Co Ltd
- McFarlane Brian. (ed). The Encyclopedia of British Film. Methuen (2nd edition)
- Moseley, Roy. (2000). Evergreen: Victor Saville in His Own Words. Southern Illinois University Press
- Pascoe, John. (2020). Madeleine Carroll: Actress and Humanitarian, from The 39 Steps to the Red. McFarland. Paperback
- Walker, John. (ed). (1998). Halliwell's Film & Video Guide 1998. HarperCollins Entertainment. 13th edition
