= Bretton Byrd =

British composer (1904–1959)

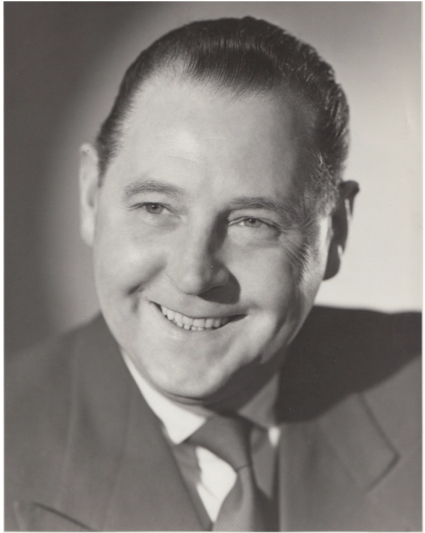
- Born: 30 November 1904; Ramsgate, Kent, England
- Died: 27 September 1959 (aged 54); Harrow, Middlesex, England
- Other name: James Thomas Bird
- Occupations: Composer, musician
- Years active: 1932 – 1956 (film)

Bretton Byrd (30 November 1904 – 27 September 1959) was a British composer and musician known for his work on film scores between 1932 and 1956. Born in Ramsgate, Kent, his real name was James Thomas Bird.

== Career ==
Byrd was largely self-taught as a singer and pianist, and made his living as a performer from the age of 16. This led to work as conductor and composer for travelling revues and pantomimes around the UK. He accompanied Hetty King, Harry Jolson (brother of Al) and other variety acts.

After an introduction to Louis Levy in 1930 he was employed by British Gaumont, then the largest British production company. He began writing scores for films such as It's Love Again (1936). Byrd worked for the company's musical department both as a composer and arranger. After leaving British Gaumont, he was employed by a variety of other production companies including Metro-Goldwyn-Mayer, Warner Bros., RKO Radio, and Twentieth Century.

In the 1950s Byrd also worked in television, as the musical director for Douglas Fairbanks' series of 160 television films, for 35 of which he also composed the music. He was also the musical director for the Monte Cristo and Charlie Chan series.

== Selected filmography ==
- Jack's the Boy (1932)
- Love on Wheels (1932)
- Sleeping Car (1933)
- Friday the Thirteenth (1933)
- Britannia of Billingsgate (1933)
- Jack Ahoy (1934)
- Jew Süss (1934)
- Road House (1934)
- Oh, Daddy! (1935)
- Boys Will Be Boys (1935)
- First a Girl (1935)
- It's Love Again (1936)
- Jack of All Trades (1936)
- Take My Tip (1937)
- Head over Heels (1937)
- Follow Your Star (1938)
- We're Going to Be Rich (1938)
- Keep Smiling (1938)
- Just like a Woman (1939)
- The Midas Touch (1940)
- Hoots Mon! (1940)
- The Good Old Days (1940)
- The Briggs Family (1940)
- That's the Ticket (1940)
- His Brother's Keeper (1940)
- Two for Danger (1940)
- George and Margaret (1940)
- The Saint's Vacation (1941)
- Turned Out Nice Again (1941)
- The Goose Steps Out (1942)
- Time Flies (1944)
- Bothered by a Beard (1946)
- Root of All Evil (1947)
- The White Unicorn (1947)
- Look Before You Love (1948)
- My Sister and I (1948)
- Police Dog (1955)
- Port of Escape (1956)
