= Take My Tip =

- Cicely Courtneidge and Jack Hulbert
- Directed by: Herbert Mason
- Written by: Francis de Croisset (play); Sidney Gilliat; Michael Hogan; Jack Hulbert
- Produced by: Michael Balcon
- Starring: Jack Hulbert; Cicely Courtneidge; Harold Huth; Frank Cellier
- Cinematography: Bernard Knowles
- Edited by: Charles Saunders
- Music by: Bretton Byrd
- Production company: Gaumont British
- Distributed by: General Film Distributors
- Release date: 7 May 1937 (London)
- Running time: 74 minutes
- Country: United Kingdom
- Language: English

Take My Tip is a 1937 British musical comedy film directed by Herbert Mason (who stage managed some musical revues in the past), produced by Michael Balcon and starring Jack Hulbert, Cicely Courtneidge, Harold Huth and Frank Cellier.

It was made at the Lime Grove Studios in Shepherd's Bush. The film's sets were designed by art director Ernö Metzner. Songs featured include "I Was Anything but Sentimental" and "I'm Like a Little Birdie out of My Cage".

== Premise ==
A pair of aristocrats adopt various disguises to unmask a confidence trickster.

== Cast ==
- Jack Hulbert as Lord George Pilkington
- Cicely Courtneidge as Lady Hattie Pilkington
- Harold Huth as Buchan
- Frank Cellier as Paradine
- Frank Pettingell as Willis
- Philip Buchel as Dancing guest
- Eliot Makeham as Digworthy
- H. F. Maltby as Patchett
- Paul Sheridan as Clerk in Hotel
- Robb Wilton as Foreman

== Critical reception ==
Britmovie called the film a "hilarious rapid-fire musical farce."

Halliwell's Film & Video Guide described the film as a "[reasonably] lively comedy musical adapted for the stars."

== Bibliography ==
- Low, Rachael. Filmmaking in 1930s Britain. George Allen & Unwin, 1985.
- Sutton, David R. A chorus of raspberries: British film comedy 1929-1939. University of Exeter Press, 2000.
- Walker, John. (ed). Halliwell's Film & Video Guide 1998. HarperCollins Entertainment, 1998. 13th edition
- Wood, Linda. British Films, 1927-1939. British Film Institute, 1986.
