= Royden Barrie =

British songwriter (1890–1948)

Rodney Bennett (1890–1948) was a British playwright, children's author, and lyricist, who also wrote under the name Royden Barrie. He was the father of the poet M. R. Peacocke and the composer Richard Rodney Bennett.

Bennett was educated at Reading University College, where he edited the college magazine Tamesis. He then became a teacher in London, while studying singing.

He left teaching to take up singing, speech training, and musical journalism. He wrote several books, including Lets Do a Play, about acting, and The London Dramatic Books, a series of plays for children.

As Royden Barrie he wrote lyrics for songs by Eric Coates, Hayden Wood, Roger Quilter, Martin Shaw, and others.

He died at home in Budleigh Salterton on 14 April 1948.
