= Things Are Looking Up (film) =

- Film poster
- Directed by: Albert de Courville
- Written by: Stafford Dickens; Daisy Fisher; Con West; Albert de Courville
- Produced by: Michael Balcon; Herbert Mason; Alexander Korda (uncredited)
- Starring: Cicely Courtneidge; Max Miller; William Gargan; Mary Lawson
- Cinematography: Charles Van Enger; Glen MacWilliams
- Edited by: R. E. Dearing
- Music by: Louis Levy
- Production company: Gaumont British
- Distributed by: Gaumont British Distributors
- Release date: 9 June 1935
- Running time: 80 minutes
- Country: United Kingdom
- Language: English

Things Are Looking Up is a 1935 British musical comedy film directed by Albert de Courville and starring Cicely Courtneidge, Max Miller and William Gargan. It was written by Con West and Stafford Dickens from a story by Daisy Fisher and de Courville. It was produced by Michael Balcon for Gaumont British.

Courtneidge plays a dual role as the sisters Bertha and Cicely Fytte. Bertha is a dour schoolteacher, while the bubbly Cicely runs a nearby circus. When Bertha elopes, Cicely takes her place at the school to prevent her from getting the sack. It was the film debut for Vivien Leigh.

== Plot ==
Cicely Fytte is a circus equestrienne and the twin sister of Bertha Fytte who disapproves of her. Bertha is a strict schoolteacher at a girls' boarding school and not well liked by the girls. One day Bertha elopes with a wrestler so Cicely temporarily takes her place as teacher for one day – to prevent her from losing her job. Cicely is livelier and not as disapproving as Bertha so the girls are initially surprised by Cicely's bubbly personality – unaware that she isn't Bertha. A series of comical events follow: up-beating singing in a music class (leading to the composition of the song "Things Are Looking Up"), winning a tennis match at Wimbledon (despite not having as much experience as Bertha and breaking a racket) and trying to teach geometry (despite not knowing the subject). In spite of her unorthodox methods, she becomes successful and by the time Bertha (having been shortlisted to succeed the retiring headmistress) returns, she becomes headmistress. As soon as Bertha comes back to the school, Cicely leaves with the music teacher, Van Gaard in his car and they sing their song from the music lesson Cicely covered – "Things Are Looking Up".

== Cast ==
- Cicely Courtneidge as Cicely Fytte / Bertha Fytte
- Max Miller as Joey
- William Gargan as Van Gaard
- Mary Lawson as Mary Fytte
- Mark Lester as Chairman
- Henrietta Watson as Miss McTavish
- Cicely Oates as Miss Crabbe
- Judy Kelly as Opal
- Dick Henderson as Mr. Money
- Dickie Henderson as Mr. Money's son (billed as Dick Henderson Jr.)
- Charles Mortimer as Harry
- Hay Plumb as tennis umpire
- Danny Green as Big Black Fox
- Suzanne Lenglen as Madame Bombardier
- Vivien Leigh as schoolgirl
- Alma Taylor as schoolmistress (uncredited)
- Wyn Weaver as Governor (uncredited)
- Ian Wilson as drummer in band (uncredited)

== Production ==
It was made at Islington Studios by British Gaumont, an affiliate of Gainsborough Pictures. The film's sets were designed by Alex Vetchinsky.

== Critical reception ==
Kine Weekly wrote: "Spirited comedy burlesque designed to give full scope to the amazing versatility of Cicely Courtneidge. The slight story is thoroughly amusing in a boisterous way and provides the star with an endless chain of riotous gags, gorgeously put over. The fun is fast and furious from the word 'go'."

Picturegoer wrote: "Fans of Cicely Courtneidge, at any rate, will have nothing to complain about so far as this spirited comedy burlesque is concerned. Indeed, it seems to have been specially designed to give full scope to the versatility of the star, and is on her individual brilliance that the picture must stand."

TV Guide called the film a "quite good comedy," and rated it two out of four stars.

David Quinlan described the film as a comedy dominated by Cicely Courtneidge.

Halliwell's Film & Video Guide described the film as a "[lively] star vehicle for an oddly matched team."

== Bibliography ==
- Cook, Pam. (1997). Gainsborough Pictures. Performing Arts
- Howard Reid, John. (2005). Hollywood's Miracles of Entertainment. Lulu.com
