= Stafford Dickens =

British actor, screenwriter and film director (1888–1967)

Charles Stafford Dickens (1888–1967) was a British actor, screenwriter and film director.

== Selected filmography ==
Screenwriter

- Command Performance (1931)
- The Midshipmaid (1932)
- Wild Boy (1934)
- Temptation (1934)
- Car of Dreams (1935)
- Things Are Looking Up (1935)
- Windbag the Sailor (1936)
- Everybody Dance (1936)
- The Live Wire (1937)
- Follow Your Star (1938)
- Dead Men Tell No Tales (1938)
- The Voice Within (1946)
- The Idol of Paris (1948)
- My Wife's Lodger (1952)

Director

- Please Teacher (1937)
- Skimpy in the Navy (1949)
