= John Hunter =

John Hunter may refer to:

== Politics ==
- John Hunter (British politician) (1724–1802), British Member of Parliament for Leominster
- John Hunter (Canadian politician) (1909–1993), Canadian Liberal MP for Parkdale, 1949–1957
- Sir John Hunter (consul-general) (died 1816), British consul-general in Spain
- John Hunter (Northern Ireland politician), Ulster unionist member of the Northern Ireland Forum
- John Hunter (Royal Navy officer) (1737–1821), Governor of New South Wales
- John Hunter (South Carolina politician) (c. 1750–1802), American politician
- John Hunter (Westchester County, New York) (1778–1852), New York politician
- John F. Hunter (1896–1957), U.S. Representative from Ohio
- John W. Hunter (1807–1900), US Congressman from New York
- Jon Blair Hunter (fl. 1990s–2000s), West Virginia politician
- John Dunn Hunter (1796–1827), leader of the Fredonian Rebellion
- John McEwan Hunter (1863–1940), member of the Queensland Legislative Assembly

== Sports ==
=== Soccer ===
- John Hunter (Third Lanark footballer) (died 1881), Scottish football player
- John Hunter (Australian footballer), Scottish-born Australian former footballer and coach
- Ian Hunter (Scottish footballer) (born John Hunter, fl. 1960s), Scottish footballer (Falkirk)
- John Hunter (Falkirk footballer) (fl. 1920s), Scottish footballer (Falkirk, Reading, Guildford)
- John Hunter (footballer, born 1878) (1878–1966), known as 'Sailor', Scottish football player and manager (Motherwell)
- Jock Hunter (1875–1950), Scottish footballer

=== Others ===
- John Hunter (American football), American football player
- John Hunter (golfer) (1871–1946), Scottish professional golfer
- John Hunter (rower) (born 1943), New Zealand rower
- John Hunter (rugby union) (1920–2006), Scotland international rugby union player
- Johnny Hunter (rugby league) (1925–1980), Australian rugby league footballer
- John Hunter (runner), winner of the 1980 distance medley relay at the NCAA Division I Indoor Track and Field Championships

== Authors and academics ==
- J. A. Hunter (John Alexander Hunter, 1887–1963), white hunter in Africa, later a writer
- John Hunter (scientist) (born 1955), projectile researcher
- John Hunter (screenwriter) (1911–1984), American award-winning screenwriter
- John E. Hunter (1939–2002), American psychologist and statistician
- John Hunter (classicist) (1746–1837), joint founder of the Royal Society of Edinburgh
- John McNeile Hunter (1901–1979), American physicist and chemist
- John Stuart Hunter (born 1923), American statistician and engineer

== Physicians ==
- John Hunter (surgeon) (1728–1793), Scottish surgeon and anatomist
- John Hunter (physician) (1754–1809), Scottish physician linked to Jamaica
- John Irvine Hunter (1898–1924), Australian anatomist
- John D. Hunter (1968–2012), American neurobiologist and creator of matplotlib

== Others ==
- John A. Hunter (judge) (1833–1887), chief justice of the Supreme Court of the Utah Territory
- John Kelso Hunter (1802–1873), Scottish portrait painter
- John Hart Hunter (1807–1872), college fraternity founder
- John Hunter (bishop) (1897–1965), former bishop of Kimberley and Kuruman
- John E. L. Hunter (1897–1971), World War I fighter ace
- Jackie Hunter (entertainer) (John Hunter, 1903–1951), Canadian entertainer
- John Hunter (performer), New Zealand female impersonator
- John Hunter (singer), American singer and musician
- Sir John Hunter (colonial administrator), British colonial administrator
- John Oswald Mair Hunter, Lord Hunter, Scottish judge
- John Hunter (British Indian Army officer) (1859–1926)
- Johnny Hunter (musician), British jazz drummer, composer and bandleader

== See also ==
- Jack Hunter (disambiguation)
