= John A. Hunter =

John A. Hunter may refer to:

- J. A. Hunter (John Alexander Hunter, 1887–1963), white hunter in Africa
- John A. Hunter (judge) (1833–1887), chief justice of the Supreme Court of the Utah Territory
- Sir John Hunter (colonial administrator) (John Adams Hunter, 1890–1962), British colonial administrator
- John Hunter (rower) (John Andrew Hunter, born 1943), New Zealand rower

== See also ==
- John Hunter (disambiguation)
