= Dick Barton: Special Agent =

1948 British film by Raymond Raikes

- Opening title
- Directed by: Alfred J. Goulding
- Written by: Alfred J. Goulding; Alan Stranks
- Based on: the BBC radio serial
- Produced by: Henry Halstead
- Starring: Don Stannard; George Ford
- Cinematography: Stanley Clinton
- Edited by: Eta Simpson
- Music by: John Bath
- Production company: Hammer Film Productions
- Distributed by: Exclusive Films
- Release date: 10 May 1948
- Running time: 71 minutes
- Country: United Kingdom
- Language: English

Dick Barton: Special Agent (released to television in the USA as Dick Barton, Detective) is a 1948 British second feature ('B') spy film directed by Alfred J. Goulding and starring Don Stannard. It was written by Goulding and Alan Stranks, adapted from the BBC radio serial Dick Barton – Special Agent. It was the first of three films that Hammer Film Productions made about the British agent, followed by Dick Barton Strikes Back (1949) Dick Barton at Bay (1950).

== Plot ==
Special Agent Dick Barton, along with his colleagues Snowey and Jock, are investigating smuggling when two failed attempts are made on his life. The criminals then kidnap Snowey and Jack, as well as Dick's girlfriend Jean. While attempting to rescue his friends, Barton is trapped himself in an underground room where he is chained to a wall. It turns out the criminals led by Dr. Caspar are involved in a neo-Nazi plot to contaminate Great Britain's water supply.

== Cast ==
- Don Stannard as Dick Barton
- George Ford as Snowey
- Jack Shaw as Jock
- Gillian Maude as Jean
- Beatrice Kane as Mrs Horrock
- Ivor Danvers as Snub
- Geoffrey Wincott as Dr. Caspar
- Arthur Bush as Schuler
- Alec Ross as Tony

== Critical reception ==
The Monthly Film Bulletin wrote: "Though somewhat lacking in intentional humour, the film is packed with every imaginable adventurous situation, both of the credible and the distinctly incredible kind, and if most adult audiences find it hard to take it seriously, it is sure of a riotous success with schoolboys. Don Stannard makes a manly and dashing hero as Dick, and it is largely due to his magnificent physique that some of the incidents in the film are less ludicrous than they might otherwise appear. In comparison, the rest of the cast seem a little tame and insignificant."

Kine Weekly wrote: "Jolly comedy crime melodrama, adapted from the immensely popular BBC feature. It depicts with disarming gusto how Dick Barton, daredevil private detective, rids England of a new crop of Nazis. Don Stannard, a comparative newcomer, is the ideal selection for the title role. ... Even more of a lark than a thriller, it's pretty certain to find favour with the industrial masses and youngsters."

Sky Cinema noted "schoolboy shenanigans from slick Dick and his (badly miscast) aides Jock and Snowy. More laugh-a-minute than thrill-a-minute, this was British 'B'-film making at its grimmest."

DVD Talk wrote "the picture has an Ed Wood-like ineptitude."
