= Dick Barton at Bay =

1950 British film by Godfrey Grayson

- Original trade ad in Kinematograph Weekly
- Directed by: Godfrey Grayson
- Written by: Ambrose Grayson (based on the BBC radio series)
- Produced by: Henry Halstead
- Starring: Don Stannard
- Cinematography: Stanley Clinton
- Edited by: Max Brenner
- Music by: Rupert Grayson; Frank Spencer
- Production company: Hammer Film Productions
- Distributed by: Exclusive Films
- Release date: 2 October 1950
- Running time: 68 minutes
- Country: United Kingdom
- Language: English

Dick Barton at Bay is a 1950 British second feature ('B') spy film directed by Godfrey Grayson and starring Don Stannard. It was written by Ambrose Grayson and was intended to be the second of three films that Hammer Film Productions made about the British agent Dick Barton, although it was the last one to be released, following Dick Barton: Special Agent (1948) and Dick Barton Strikes Back (1949). The film started production on March 4, 1948 (intended to be the 2nd film in a Dick Barton trilogy), but it was only trade shown on September 2, 1950, and theatrically released on October 2, 1950. The film's original working title was Dick Barton and the Ray of Death.

== Plot ==
Captain Richard 'Dick' Barton and his sidekick 'Snowey' White are quickly assigned to recover a kidnapped scientist and de-activate a death ray created by the evil foreign agent Volkoff, who wants to use it to bring down British planes.

== Cast ==
- Don Stannard as Dick Barton
- Tamara Desni as Anna
- George Ford as Snowey White
- Meinhart Maur as Serge Volkoff
- Joyce Linden as Mary Mitchell
- Percy Walsh as Professor Mitchell
- Campbell Singer as Sir George Cavendish
- John Arnatt as Jackson
- Richard George as Inspector Slade
- Beatrice Kane as Betsy Horrock
- Patrick Macnee as Phillips (Credited as Patrick McNee)
- George Crawford as Boris
- Paddy Ryan as Fingers
- Fred Owens as gangster (credited as Fred Owen)
- Yoshihide Yanai as Chang
- Ted Butterfield as Tommy
- Arthur Howard as extra
- Eliot Makeham as police sergeant
- Jim O'Brady as henchman
- Ross Parker as stall holder
- Ben Williams as Submarine Captain Korczanski

== Production ==
A fourth Dick Barton film was scheduled, to be called Dick Barton in Darkest Africa, but Don Stannard was killed in an untimely car crash driving back from the wrap party on July 9, 1949, and Hammer elected not to continue the series.

== Critical reception ==
Sky Cinema wrote: "In their rush to get Barton on to the screen, the makers, despite using the original radio serials as a basis, neglected to give the films the proper budget, resulting in Dick's adventures having an air of tatty, thick-ear melodrama which was never present for the millions of wireless devotees glued to their sets every night at 6.45pm."

In British Sound Films: The Studio Years 1928–1959 David Quinlan rated the film as "mediocre", writing: "Strictly for younger schoolboys."

TV Guide noted "a simple action-adventure film that moves at an entertaining pace."

Allmovie called it "a far better thriller than its predecessor".
