= Grace Garland (film editor) =

British film editor

- Other names: Grace Garland Janisz
- Occupation: Film editors
- Years active: 1941–1989

Grace Garland (sometimes credited as Grace Garland Janisz) was a British film editor active from the 1940s through the 1980s.

== Selected filmography ==
- Bonnie Prince Charlie (1948)
- Nightbeat (1947)
- Beware of Pity (1946)
- Don Chicago (1945)
- Strawberry Roan (1944)
- The Gay Intruders (1944)
- The Shipbuilders (1943) (associate editor)
- Let the People Sing (1942) (assistant editor)
- The Common Touch (1941) (assistant editor)
