= Elizabeth Baron =

Australian screenwriter (born 1910)

- Born: 1910; Melbourne, Australia
- Occupation: Screenwriter

Elizabeth Baron (born 1910, date of death unknown) was an Australian screenwriter who worked in the British film industry in the 1940s, collaborating with directors such as Maurice Elvey.

== Selected filmography ==
- Dick Barton Strikes Back (1949)
- Beware of Pity (1946)
- Strawberry Roan (1944)
- Medal for the General (1944)
- The Gay Intruders (1944)
- The Lamp Still Burns (1943)
- The Gentle Sex (1943)
- Mr Bunting at War (1942)
- Salute John Citizen (1942)
