= Jack Hunter =

Jack Hunter may refer to:

== People ==
- Jack Hunter (English footballer) (1852–1903), English footballer
- Jackie Hunter (1903–1951), Canadian entertainer
- Jack Hunter (Australian footballer) (1914–1990), Australian rules footballer
- Jack D. Hunter (1921–2009), writer
- Jack Hunter (radio host) (born 1974), libertarian radio host and columnist
- Jack Hunter (cricketer) (born 1995), New Zealand cricketer

== Television ==
- Jack Hunter (film series), a 2008 television film series parodying Indiana Jones
  - Jack Hunter, the series' protagonist, played by Ivan Sergei
- Jack Hunter (Boy Meets World), a character in the TV show Boy Meets World

== See also ==
- John Hunter (disambiguation)
