= Menace (1934 British film) =

- D. A. Clarke-Smith, Joan Maude and Victor Varconi in the film
- Directed by: Adrian Brunel
- Written by: Victor Varconi; A. R. Rawlinson; Heinrich Fraenkel
- Produced by: Norman Loudon
- Starring: Victor Varconi; Joan Maude; D. A. Clarke-Smith; Hubert Leslie
- Cinematography: George Stretton; Claude Friese-Greene
- Music by: Colin Wark
- Production company: Sound City
- Distributed by: Reunion Films
- Release date: December 1934
- Running time: 70 minutes
- Country: United Kingdom
- Language: English

Menace (also known as Sabotage; U.S. title: When London Sleeps) is a 1934 British crime film directed by Adrian Brunel and starring Victor Varconi, Joan Maude and D. A. Clarke-Smith. It was written by Varconi, A. R. Rawlinson and Heinrich Fraenkel, and was made as quota quickie at Shepperton Studios by the Sound City production company.

== Preservation status ==
The British Film Institute National Archive holds no stills or ephemera, and no film or video materials.

== Plot ==
Having suffered shell shock during the World War I, Stephen Ronsart, a distinguished engineer and explosives expert, develops a Jekyll and Hyde-like split personality. His darker alter ego manifests a sinister obsession, causing a series of catastrophic train crashes that baffle the police and bring the railway to a virtual standstill. In a cruel twist of fast, the authorities enlist Ronsart himself to thwart the saboteur's reign of terror, and he invents an invisible ray designed to protect the trains from danger. In the end, the tragic engineer meets his demise, finally bringing a close to the widespread chaos and destruction he has created.

== Cast ==
- Victor Varconi as Stephen Ronsart
- Joan Maude as Lady Conway
- D. A. Clarke-Smith as Sir Robert Conway
- Hubert Leslie as Mr. Jones
- Joan Matheson as Mrs. Jones
- J.A. O'Rourke as O'Leary
- Shayle Gardner as Commissioner
- Wilfred Noy as Dean

== Reception ==
Kine Weekly wrote: "Railroad melodrama with a Jekyll and Hyde theme, this picture has little to distinguish it from ordinary quota product. The few spectacularly and realistically staged train-smash sequences may excite the unsophisticated but emotionally the plot is out-moded. The cast list, too, is devoid of outstanding personalities. Just a thriller, a second feature for small-time industrial situations."

The Daily Film Renter wrote: "Unconvincing narrative, developed on old-fashioned lines, with occasionally stilted acting, but subject scores with series of realistic railway crashes and quota of suspense ... Victor Varconi plays Ronsart with a great deal of vigour, Joan Maude handling the feminine element. D. A. Clarke Smith is prominent as the harassed railway chief, asd J. O'Rourke is pleasing as an Irish valet."

Picture Show wrote: "Somewhat lurid melodrama in which a famous railway magnate has a dual personality – or perhaps, more accurately, brainstorms as the result of war injuries – and plans train wrecks. Victor Vareoni, the author of the story, gives a clever study of the man whose temporary insanity causes all the trouble."
