= Don Stannard =

British actor (1915–1949)

- Dick Barton publicity still
- Born: 1915; Westcliff-on-Sea, Essex, England, UK
- Died: 9 July 1949 (aged 33–34); Cookham Dean, Berkshire, England, UK
- Education: RADA
- Occupation: Actor

Don Stannard (10 September 1915 – 9 July 1949) was a British actor.

Born in Westcliff-on-Sea, Essex, Stannard was the son of a banker, A. Gordon Smythe Stannard, and Abigail Stannard. He attended Lindisfarne College and trained at RADA, graduating in 1935. He acted in repertory theater and had bit parts in English films, and inability to gain recognition nearly caused him to give up acting and join his father in banking.

He was a stand-in for Robert Donat before a screen test led to his being signed by Metro-Goldwyn-Mayer in 1937. The subject of the test in England was a young woman, and Stannard's face was seen only in flashes opposite her. Louis B. Mayer, who was in London on a talent search, saw the test and signed Stannard to a contract.

He is best remembered for playing the secret agent Dick Barton in three Hammer films: Dick Barton: Special Agent, Dick Barton Strikes Back and Dick Barton at Bay. A fourth Barton film was scheduled, Dick Barton in Africa, but Stannard was killed in a car crash driving back from the wrap party and Hammer elected not to continue the series.

Stannard was also an author, playwright, and poet.

== Filmography ==
Year	Title	Role	Notes
1938	Hold That Kiss	Captain in Moving Picture	Uncredited
1939	Bridal Suite	Best Man	Uncredited
1945	Don Chicago	Ken Cressing	
1945	Pink String and Sealing Wax	John Bevan	
1945	Caesar and Cleopatra	Roman Officer	Uncredited
1946	I'll Turn to You	Roger Meredith	
1947	Death in High Heels	Detective Charlesworth	
1948	Dick Barton: Special Agent	Dick Barton	
1949	The Temptress	Derek Clifford	
1949	Dick Barton Strikes Back	Dick Barton	
1950	Dick Barton at Bay	Dick Barton	(final film role)
