= John Emery (actor) =

American actor (1905–1964)

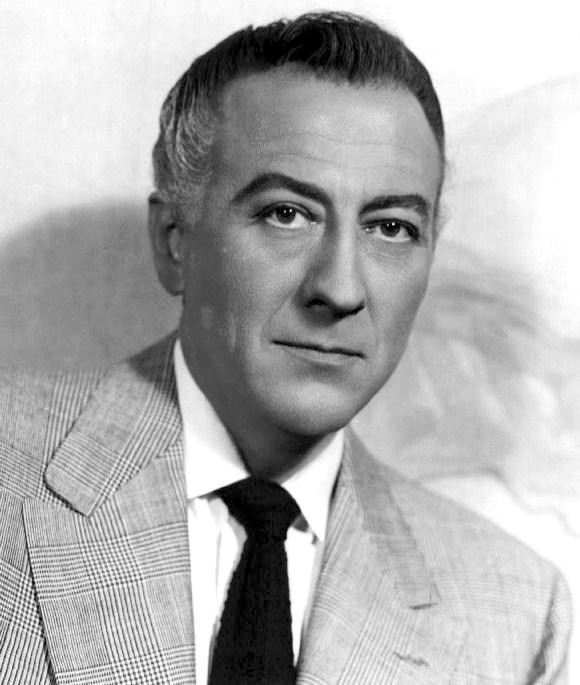
- Emery in 1958
- Born: May 20, 1905; New York City, U.S.
- Died: November 16, 1964 (aged 59); New York City, U.S.
- Resting place: Ferncliff Cemetery and Mausoleum
- Occupation: Actor
- Years active: 1937–1964
- Spouses: Patricia Calvert (m. 1926; div. 1929) Tallulah Bankhead (m. 1937; div. 1941) Tamara Geva (m. 1942; div. 1963)

John Emery (May 20, 1905 – November 16, 1964) was an American actor.

== Early years ==
Born in New York City, Emery was the son of stage actors Edward Emery (c. 1861 – 1938) and Isabel Waldron (1871–1950). He was educated at Long Island's La Salle Military Academy.

== Film ==
Through the late 1930s to the early 1960s Emery appeared in supporting roles in many Hollywood films, beginning with James Whale's The Road Back (1937) and ranging from Alfred Hitchcock's Spellbound to Rocketship X-M.

== Stage ==
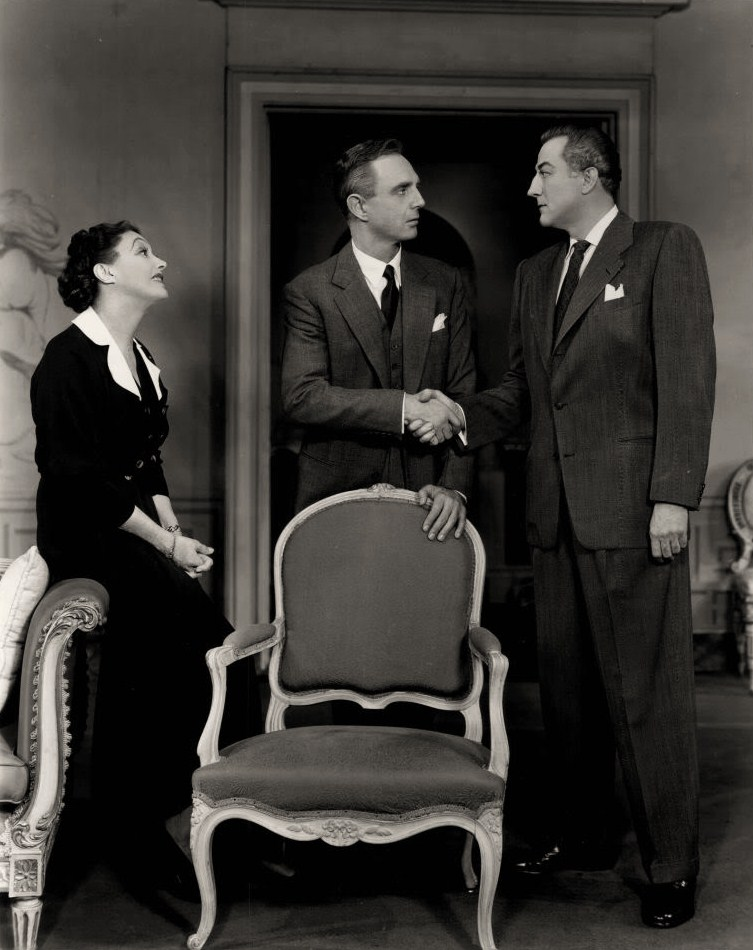
Katharine Cornell, Robert Flemyng and Emery in a revival of W. Somerset Maugham's The Constant Wife (1953)

Emery appeared on Broadway in John Brown (1934), Romeo and Juliet (1934-1935), The Barretts of Wimpole Street (1935), Flowers of the Forest (1935), Parnell (1935-1936), Alice Takat (1936), Sweet Aloes (1936), Hamlet (1936-1937), Antony and Cleopatra (1937), Save Me the Waltz (1938), The Unconquered (1940), Liliom (1940), Retreat to Pleasure (1940-1941), Angel Street (1941-1944), Peepshow (1944), The Relapse (1950), The Royal Family (1951), The Constant Wife (1951-1952), Anastasia (1954-1955), Hotel Paradiso (1957), and Rape of the Belt (1960).

Peepshow was the first production in which Emery and his third wife, Tamara Geva, appeared together.

== Television and radio ==
Emery was also known for his television work, appearing on programs like I Love Lucy and Have Gun Will Travel. In 1946 he starred in a radio program as detective Philo Vance.

== Personal life ==
Emery married Patricia Calvert in 1926, ending in divorce in 1929. He married Tallulah Bankhead on August 31, 1937, in Jasper, Alabama (her only marriage), divorcing on June 13, 1941, in Reno, Nevada. The two remained friendly after their marriage. In 1942, Emery married dancer Tamara Geva, divorcing in 1963. Emery had started a long-term relationship with actress Joan Bennett in 1961, who cared for him through his final illness and death in 1964.

Due to their resemblance, Emery often was rumoured to be the illegitimate child of John Barrymore. As a child, Emery roomed for a while with Barrymore and his first wife, Katherine Corri.

== Death ==
Emery died on November 16, 1964, in New York City, aged 59 from throat cancer.

== Selected filmography ==
- The Road Back (1937) - Captain Von Hagen
- Here Comes Mr. Jordan (1941) - Tony Abbott
- The Corsican Brothers (1941) - Tomasso
- Two Yanks in Trinidad (1942) - Chicago Hagen
- Ship Ahoy (1942) - Dr. Farno
- Eyes in the Night (1942) - Paul Gerente
- George Washington Slept Here (1942) - Clayton Evans
- Assignment in Brittany (1943) - Captain Deichgraber
- Mademoiselle Fifi (1944) - Jean Cornudet
- Blood on the Sun (1945) - Premier Giichi Tanaka
- The Spanish Main (1945) - Captain Mario Du Billar
- Spellbound (1945) - Dr. Fleurot
- The Voice of the Turtle (1947) - George Harrington
- Let's Live Again (1948) - Larry Blake
- The Woman in White (1948) - Sir Percival Glyde
- The Gay Intruders (1948) - John Newberry
- Joan of Arc (1948) - Jean, Duke d'Alençon, cousin of Charles VII
- Dakota Lil (1950) - Vincent
- Rocketship X-M (1950) - Dr. Karl Eckstrom
- Frenchie (1950) - Clyde Gorman
- Double Crossbones (1951) - Governor Elden
- Joe Palooka in Triple Cross (1951) - 'Professor'
- The Mad Magician (1954) - The Great Rinaldi
- A Lawless Street (1955) - Cody Clark
- Forever, Darling (1956) - Dr. Edward R. Winter
- The Girl Can't Help It (1956) - Wheeler
- Kronos (1957) - Dr. Hubbell Eliot
- Ten North Frederick (1958) - Paul Donaldson
- Youngblood Hawke (1964) - Georges Peydal (final film role)

== Selected television ==
Year	Title	Role	Notes
1958	Colgate Theatre	Ralph Carter	Season 1 Episode 1: "Adventures of a Model"
1959	Have Gun - Will Travel	Merle Corvin	Season 2 Episode 36: "The Fifth Man"
1961	The Tom Ewell Show	Jack Hunter	Season 1 Episode 22: "The Old Magic"
1961	Alfred Hitchcock Presents	Kerwin Drake	Season 6 Episode 34: "Servant Problem"
