= The Girl Habit =

1931 film

- Theatrical release poster
- Directed by: Edward F. Cline
- Screenplay by: Owen Davis; Clayton Hamilton; Gertrude Purcell; A.E. Thomas
- Starring: Charlie Ruggles; Tamara Geva; Margaret Dumont; Allen Jenkins; Donald Meek
- Cinematography: Larry Williams
- Edited by: Barney Rogan
- Music by: Johnny Green
- Production company: Paramount Pictures
- Distributed by: Paramount Pictures
- Release date: June 27, 1931
- Running time: 77 minutes
- Country: United States
- Language: English

The Girl Habit is a 1931 American comedy film directed by Edward F. Cline and written by Owen Davis, Clayton Hamilton, Gertrude Purcell, and A.E. Thomas. The pre-Code film stars Charlie Ruggles, Tamara Geva, Margaret Dumont, Allen Jenkins, and Donald Meek. The film was released on June 27, 1931, by Paramount Pictures.

== Plot ==
A mild Lothario tries to get arrested as protection from the gangster husband who has threatened him.

== Cast ==
- Charlie Ruggles as Charlie Floyd
- Tamara Geva as Sonja Maloney
- Sue Conroy as Lucy Ledyard
- Margaret Dumont as Blanche Ledyard
- Allen Jenkins as Tony Maloney
- Donald Meek as Jonesy
- Douglas Gilmore as Huntley Palmer
- Jerome Daley as Warden Henry
- Betty Garde as Hattie Henry

== Reception ==
Motion Picture Herald found the film "refreshing" with a "constant flow of laughter", specifically citing Charlie Ruggles as the main reason the picture delighted audiences. Screenland, however, was not as enthusiastic, saying the scenes were overlong.
