= John Mann (British actor) =

English actor

John Mann (1915–1981) was an English actor.

He is best remembered for playing the cockney Snowy White who assisted the hero in Dick Barton for the BBC Light Programme between 1946 and 1951.

He trained at RADA in the early 1930s and then played many smaller roles in the theatre both in London and touring until called up in WW2. He was posted to Stars in Battledress until demob in 1946.

He also had small parts in films such as It's not Cricket and Christopher Columbus. As work dried up in the early 1950s he continued with his love of acting by taking part in amateur dramatics and it was on the way home from rehearsals that he died in 1981.
