= Stefan Bednarczyk =

British cabaret performer

Stefan Bednarczyk is a British cabaret performer.

== Biography ==
Stefan Bednarczyk was born in 1960. He took his bachelor's degree in music at The Queen's College, Oxford. He worked as a writer for Granada Television. He then worked as a musical director for productions at London theatres including the National Theatre, the Almeida Theatre, the Barbican, the Hampstead Theatre, St James Theatre, the Jermyn Street Theatre, and the Open Air Theatre, Regent's Park. At the Warehouse Theatre, Croydon he composed and directed the music for many productions including Dick Barton – Special Agent. He has directed music at theatres in cities around the United Kingdom. He has performed cabaret in venues in London and in countries around the world. He has worked as an actor on stage and in film. He is the choirmaster and organist at St Patrick's Church, Soho Square. He is a guest musical director at the Royal Academy of Dramatic Art. In 2014, he appeared on BBC Radio London's Lo Good and Simon Lederman show. He serves as a singing tutor at the Royal Academy of Dramatic Art in its foundation course in acting and its short courses.

== Reception ==
Stephen Collins, reviewing Noël Coward's Christmas Spirits for British Theatre in 2014, wrote that Bednarczyk had the "truly difficult task" of playing Noël Coward, and serving as accompanist. Accepting that he had chosen "suggestion rather than imitation", Collins found that "although not as dextrous, charming or sparkling as Coward himself, Bednarczyk does summon up a real sense of his style, attitude and air", and was excellent both as Scrooge and in his recitations of Coward, with "a real rapport" with Coward's work, as in London Pride and Don't Let's Be Beastly to the Germans.

In 2024, in Musical Theatre Review, Jeremy Chapman described " the charmingly old-school" Bednarczyk's An Evening of Jake Thackray at The Pheasantry, London as "twice as good as you expected it to be". He described Bednarczyk as "actor, singer, composer, director, church organist, choirmaster, accompanist to the stars", and noted that the audience had not necessarily heard of either Thackray or the performer, but "laughed all the time anyway".
