= Let's Live Again =

1948 film by Herbert I. Leeds

- Theatrical release poster
- Directed by: Herbert I. Leeds
- Screenplay by: Rodney Carlisle; Robert Smiley
- Story by: John Vlahos; H.A. Wohl
- Produced by: Frank N. Seltzer
- Starring: John Emery; Hillary Brooke; Taylor Holmes; Diana Douglas; James Millican; Charles D. Brown
- Cinematography: Mack Stengler
- Edited by: Bert Jordan
- Music by: Raoul Kraushaar
- Production company: 20th Century Fox
- Distributed by: 20th Century Fox
- Release date: February 27, 1948
- Running time: 67 minutes
- Country: United States
- Language: English
- Budget: $133,000

Let's Live Again is a 1948 American comedy film directed by Herbert I. Leeds. It is written by Rodney Carlisle and Robert Smiley. The film stars John Emery, Hillary Brooke, Taylor Holmes, Diana Douglas, James Millican and Charles D. Brown. The film was released on February 27, 1948, by 20th Century Fox.

== Plot ==
Atomic scientist Larry Blake and his uncle Jim receive news that Larry's explorer brother George, who had left on an expedition to Tibet to investigate reports of reincarnations there, is believed to have been killed in a plane crash. While Larry is in a bar drowning his sorrows, a dog suddenly appears. Larry becomes convinced the dog is George reincarnated and has returned to annoy him.

== Cast ==
- John Emery as Larry Blake
- Hillary Brooke as Sandra Marlowe
- Taylor Holmes as Uncle Jim
- Diana Douglas as Terry
- James Millican as George Blake
- Charles D. Brown as Psychiatrist
- Percy Helton as Mr. President
- Jeff Corey as Bartender
- Earle Hodgins as Novelty salesman
- John Parrish as Doctor
- Dewey Robinson as Policeman
