= The Temptress (1949 film) =

- Opening titles
- Directed by: Oswald Mitchell
- Written by: Kathleen Butler; Alice Campbell (novel)
- Produced by: Gilbert Church
- Starring: Joan Maude; Arnold Bell; Don Stannard
- Cinematography: S.D. Onions
- Music by: W.L. Trytel
- Production company: Gilbert Church Productions
- Distributed by: Ambassador Film Productions
- Release date: April 1949
- Running time: 85 minutes
- Country: United Kingdom
- Language: English

The Temptress is a 1949 British second feature ('B') drama film directed by Oswald Mitchell and starring Joan Maude, Arnold Bell and Don Stannard. It was written by Kathleen Butler based on the 1928 novel Juggernaut by Alice Campbell, and was made at Bushey Studios, the final film to be directed by Mitchell before his death the same year.

== Plot ==
Brilliant physician Dr Leroy is in need of cash for his research in infantile paralysis, and to perfect a cure. One of his patients is Sir Charles Clifford, whose wife, Lady Clifford, is having an affair with gigolo Julian. She is also in need of money, and asks Leroy to murder Sir Charles, and they will divide his fortune between themselves. Leroy agrees to the plan. However, when Sir Charles dies it emerges that he has left his entire estate to his son Derek. Leroy then tries to kill Derek, but fails and commits suicide. Lady Clifford is arrested.

== Cast ==
- Joan Maude as Lady Clifford
- Arnold Bell as Dr. Leroy
- Don Stannard as Derek Clifford
- Shirley Quentin as nurse
- John Stuart as Sir Charles Clifford
- Ferdy Mayne as Julian
- Conrad Phillips as Captain Green

== Reception ==
Kine Weekly wrote: "Highly coloured, yet holding medico-melodrama ... The ethics of the play are a trifle wonky, but we are not reviewing it for The Lancet. Modern Lyceum, competently acted and directed, it is pretty certain to intrigue and grip popular provincial and industrial audiences. ... Arnold Bell delivers the dialogue smoothly and moves with dignity as Leroy, Joan Maude adopts a French accent with fair conviction as the treacherous Lady Clifford, and Don Stannard and Shirley Quentin are adequate as conventional lovers. ... The plot works out quite well, even if it may shake some people's faith in the medical profession, and, in spite of some careless talk, ends on an exciting note. Director Oswald Mitchell gets every ounce of drama from the salient situations and, at the same time, shrewdly cultivates feminine appeal."

Picturegoer wrote: "This highly coloured melodrama is quite intriguing ... The not very convincing plot is very competently developed. Arnold Bell puts up a good perfogmance as the doctor. As the treacherous Lady Clifford, Joan Maude adopts a French accent with a fair measure of success. John Stuart acts well as the unfortunate Sir Charles Clifford."

In British Sound Films: The Studio Years 1928–1959 David Quinlan rated the film as "mediocre", writing: "Gloomy thriller with unpleasant characters."
