= Elliott Sandford =

American judge (1840–1897)

Elliott Sandford (1840 – 1897) was chief justice of the Supreme Court of the Utah Territory from 1888 to 1889.

Born in Raynham, Massachusetts, Sandford received his undergraduate degree from Amherst College and his law degree from Columbia University. He practiced law primarily in New York City, until President Grover Cleveland appointed him as Chief Justice of the Utah Territorial Supreme Court in 1888 to succeed Charles S. Zane. As Chief Justice, Sandford was "severely criticized during this period for the leniency shown in both lack of prosecution and punishment of offenses under the anti-polygamy laws". Shortly after Benjamin Harrison was inaugurated to succeed Cleveland, Sandford drafted a letter of resignation, which he submitted two months later upon request from the administration. Sandford then returned to private practice in New York. He was succeeded on the court by the reappointment of Zane.

Political offices
Preceded by Charles S. Zane	Chief Justice of the Utah Territorial Supreme Court; 1888–1888	Succeeded by Charles S. Zane
