= Strawberry Roan (1945 film) =

- Promotional poster
- Directed by: Maurice Elvey
- Written by: Elizabeth Baron
- Based on: Strawberry Roan by A. G. Street
- Produced by: Louis H. Jackson
- Starring: William Hartnell; Carol Raye
- Cinematography: James Wilson
- Edited by: Grace Garland
- Music by: John D. Broadhouse; Mabel Buchanan
- Production company: British National Films
- Release date: January 1945
- Running time: 84 minutes
- Country: United Kingdom
- Language: English

Strawberry Roan is a 1945 British drama film directed by Maurice Elvey and starring William Hartnell and Carol Raye. It was written by Elizabeth Baron based on the 1932 novel of the same title by Wiltshire author A. G. Street.

== Plot ==
Farmer Chris Lowe meets and falls in love with Molly, a dancer. Despite being a city girl, she accepts his proposal of marriage and after the wedding goes to live on the farm. In an attempt to ease her into farm life, Chris buys her a strawberry roan calf to look after, but she shows no interest in it, preferring to concentrate on a life of shopping, parties and generally gadding about with Chris. Being much in love and enjoying her company, he goes along with it, but it causes him to give less and less of his attention to the farm business.

After one of his friends brings this home to him, he tells Molly that the farm is in financial difficulties and that things will have to change and she must accept that his first priority must be the business. She becomes upset and takes off on her horse, riding wildly until she suffers a fall. She manages to get back home but does not tell Chris about the fall. Later, she collapses and is taken to hospital where, despite an operation, she dies. Despite his friend offering to finance the farm so he can carry on, Chris decides to sell up his house and farm so that he can clear his debts, and then leave, but eventually his friends persuade him to stay on and take up the offer of a position as farm manager on what was his farm for the new owner.

== Cast ==
- William Hartnell (credited as Billy Hartnell) as Chris Lowe
- Carol Raye as Molly Lowe
- Walter Fitzgerald as Morley
- Sophie Stewart as Mrs. Morley
- Wylie Watson as Bill Gurd
- Petula Clark as Emily
- Joan Maude as Gladys Moon
- Norman Shelley as Dr. Lambert
- John Ruddock as Dibben
- Joan Young as Mrs. Dibben
- Ellis Irving as auctioneer
- Kynaston Reeves as dealer

== Reception ==
The Monthly Film Bulletin wrote: "Plot here is comparatively unimportant. This story succeeds or fails by the extent to which its pastoral significance is realised on the screen. It is an exposition of the message – acutely physical in origin, spiritual in ultimate – that what you take from the land you must put back. To this end director Elvey has a script which reiterates this text and presents beautiful rural vistas and intimate farmyard scenes (both photographed with sympathy and skill). But, despite an honest effort, he lacks the subtle sensitivity necessary to make these philosophical implications more than a superimposed adornment to an otherwise rather commonplace tale. It is a limitation of imaginative rather than of technical competence, and, for the rest, Elvey handles his story smoothly enough. Where the idyll gets nearest to success it is largely due to the solid work of Hartnell, who achieves an outstanding characterisation of the lovelorn farmer going down in an obstinate fight against the facts with which reason and experience and friends face him. Walter Fitzgerald and John Ruddock lend strength to the supporting cast."

Picture Show wrote: "Refreshing and agreeable."

Variety wrote: "This is a typical slow-moving, back-to-the-land film written by A. G. Street who's done other farm yarns: It looks like blah U.S. boxoffice. ... Stories like this one have little to bolster them excepting peaceful shots of rural scenery. Camera work in this is strong, but it takes more than this to make a picture."

Today's Cinema commented: "While the author's theme may not emerge with any great power or clarity...the charming rural backgrounds invest the picture with a quality of comparative originality".

The Motion Picture Herald reviewer wrote: "Praiseworthy in its aim, but just lacking in ultimate achievement...there's an uneasiness, a jumpiness about it all".
