= Dick Barton =

British radio, film and television series

Dick Barton – Special Agent is a radio thriller serial that was broadcast in the BBC Light Programme between 7 October 1946 and 30 March 1951. Produced and directed by Raymond Raikes, Neil Tuson, and Charles Lefaux, it was aired in 15-minute episodes at 6.45 (later 6.15) each weekday evening. From 11 January 1947 an additional "omnibus" edition repeated all of the week's programmes each Saturday morning between 11.00 and 12.00. In all, 711 episodes were produced and the serial achieved a peak audience of 20 million. Its end was marked by a leading article in The Times.

The serial followed the adventures of ex-commando Captain Richard Barton MC (Noel Johnson, later Duncan Carse and Gordon Davies) who, with his mates Jock Anderson (Alex McCrindle) and Snowy White (John Mann), solved all sorts of crimes, escaped from dangerous situations, and saved the nation from disaster time and time again.

The series was replaced from time to time by one about the adventures of an explorer. One episode was entitled "Plague on the Plateau".

Beginning in 1948, the Hammer film company made three Dick Barton films and, long after the radio series had been replaced by The Archers, Southern Television made a television version in 1979. Dick Barton has also been adapted into a tongue-in-cheek stage play and a spoof radio comedy. Each version has featured the originals' memorable signature tune, "Devil's Galop" by Charles Williams.

== Radio series ==
=== Stories ===
Story No.	Story name	Producer	Episode count	Episode numbers	Date
1	Dick Barton and the Secret Weapon	Neil Tuson	20	1-20	07/10/46 - 01/11/46
2	Dick Barton and the Paris Adventure	Neil Tuson	20	21-40	04/11/46 - 29/11/46
3	Dick Barton and the Cabatolin Diamonds	Neil Tuson	20	41-60	02/12/46 - 27/12/46
4	Dick Barton in South America	Neil Tuson	20	61-80	30/12/46 - 24/01/47
5	Dick Barton and the Smugglers	Neil Tuson	20	81-100	27/01/47 - 21/02/47
6	Dick Barton and the Smash and Grab Raiders	Neil Tuson	20	101-120	24/02/47 - 21/03/47
7	Dick Barton and the Tibetan Adventure	Raymond Raikes	20	121-140	24/03/47 - 18/04/47
8	Dick Barton and the Canadian Adventure	Raymond Raikes	18	141-158	19/04/47 - 09/05/47
9	Dick Barton and the Affair of the Black Panther	Raymond Raikes	19	159-177	10/05/47 - 31/05/47
10	Dick Barton and the Vulture	Neil Tuson	20	178-197	29/09/47 - 24/10/47
11	Dick Barton and the Production Report	Neil Tuson	20	198-217	27/10/47 - 21/11/47
12	Dick Barton and the Bonazio Gang	Neil Tuson	20	218-237	24/11/47 - 19/12/47
13	Dick Barton and the Li-Chang Adventure	Neil Tuson	23	238-260	22/12/47 - 23/01/48
14	Dick Barton and the Case of Conrad Ruda	David H. Godfrey	20	261-280	26/01/48 - 20/02/48
15	Dick Barton and the Jewel Thieves	Neil Tuson	20	281-300	23/02/48 - 19/03/48
16	Dick Barton and the Firefly Adventure	Neil Tuson	10	301-310	22/03/48 - 02/04/48
17	Dick Barton and the J.B. Case	Neil Tuson	20	311-330	20/09/48 - 15/10/48
18	Untitled Serial	Neil Tuson	20	331-350	18/10/48 - 12/11/48
19	Dick Barton and the Secret Formula	Neil Tuson	20	351-370	15/11/48 - 10/12/48
20	Dick Barton and the Voice	Neil Tuson	19	371-389	13/12/48 - 07/01/49
21	Dick Barton and Jordan's Folly	Neil Tuson & Frank Hauser	20	390-409	10/01/49 - 04/02/49
22	Untitled Serial	Neil Tuson & Frank Hauser	20	410-429	07/02/49 - 04/03/49
23	Dick Barton and the Betts Plan	Neil Tuson	15	430-444	07/03/49 - 25/03/49
24	Dick Barton and the Vallonian Adventure	David H. Godfrey	20	445-464	26/09/49 - 21/10/49
25	Dick Barton and the Colonel's Caveman	Charles LeFeaux	20	465-484	24/10/49 - 18/11/49
26	Dick Barton and the Black Rock	Charles LeFeaux	20	485-504	21/11/49 - 16/12/49
27	Dick Barton and the House of Windows	Archie Campbell	18	505-522	19/12/49 - 13/01/50
28	The Night of the Twenty-Seventh	Martyn C. Webster	1	Special	27/12/49
29	Untitled Serial	Cleland Finn	20	523-542	16/01/50 - 10/02/50
30	Untitled Serial	Charles LeFeaux	15	543-557	13/02/50 - 03/03/50
31	Dick Barton and the Big Fight Racket	David H. Godfrey	15	558-572	06/03/50 - 24/03/50
32	Dick Barton and the Lucky Gordan Affair	Charles LeFeaux	13	573-585	27/03/50 - 14/04/50
33	Dick Barton and the S.S. Golden Main Story	Charles LeFeaux	20	586-605	02/10/50 - 27/10/50
34	Untitled Serial	Charles LeFeaux & Archie Campbell	20	606-625	30/10/50 - 24/11/50
35	Dick Barton and the Bridge	David H. Godfrey & Ayton Whitiker	20	626-645	27/11/50 - 22/12/50
36	Untitled Serial	Archie Campbell	18	646-663	27/12/50 - 19/01/51
37	Untitled Serial	Charles LeFeaux	15	664-678	22/01/51 - 09/02/51
38	Dick Barton and the Green Triangle Gang	David H. Godfrey	20	679-698	12/02/51 - 09/03/51
39	Dick Barton and the Trail of the Rocket	Charles LeFeaux	13	699-711	12/03/51 - 30/03/51

=== Style ===
The series was devised by producer Norman Collins. The scripts were written by Edward J. Mason and Geoffrey Webb, and produced and directed by Raymond Raikes. The programme gave rise to a popular catchphrase of the late 1940s "With one bound, Dick was free!" which made light of the fact that no matter how dangerous the cliffhanging situation Dick found himself in every evening, he would always escape easily.

Early ideas for the character's name included "Bill Barton" and "Rex Drake". However, the production team finally settled on the more dynamic Dick Barton. After the series had been on the air for some time, the BBC (conscious that the biggest audience for the programme was schoolboys) wrote a strict code of what Dick and his chums could and couldn't do, one clause stating "Sex plays no part in his adventures."

=== Cast (British) ===
- Noel Johnson as Dick Barton (Story 1 - 23)
- Duncan Carse as Dick Barton (Story 24 - 32)
- Gordon Davies as Dick Barton (Story 33 - 39)
- John Mann as Snowy White
- Colin Douglas as Inspector Burke
- William Fox as Colonel Gardiner
- Alex McCrindle as Jock Anderson
- Margaret Robertson as Jean Hunter

=== Cast (Australian) ===
- Douglas Kelly as Dick Barton
- William Lloyd as Snowy White
- Patricia Kenedy as Jean Hunter
- Moira Carleton as Betsy Horrock

* With John Morgan, Robert Peach, Clifford Cowley and Richard Davies.

=== Cancellation ===
In 1951 The Archers was first broadcast at 11.45 am on the Light Programme. BBC management, led by drama head Val Gielgud, had never felt comfortable with the sensationalism of Dick Barton. The Archers, which they considered more 'suitable', took Dick Barton's place in the schedules from Easter 1951.

=== Revivals ===
In 1972 as part of the BBC's Golden Jubilee, the BBC broadcast a new, abridged, 10-episode version of the first Barton serial - "The Secret Weapon". The cast included many members of the original cast, including Noel Johnson, John Mann, William Fox, Alex McCrindle, and Margaret Robertson.

From October 1997 to May 1998, BBC Radio 4 broadcast a six-part sequel/pastiche called Richard Barton: General Practitioner!, in which Dick Barton's son Richard is a country doctor caring for his apparently senile father, who retreats into fantasies based on his past adventures, believing that there are devilish enemies lurking around him. The series was written by Edward Mason's son Lol Mason, and featured Moray Watson as old Dick Barton, Robert Bathurst as his son Richard, Matilda Ziegler as Richard's wife Sally, Julian Dutton as young Dick Barton and Iain Cuthbertson as Jock Anderson. The series was rebroadcast on BBC Radio 4 Extra in 2015 and again in 2019.

In 2009, BBC Audiobooks released Dick Barton and the Mystery of the Missing Formula (ISBN 978-1408410523), a reading of a novel based on the radio serials written by Mike Dorrell and read by Toby Stephens.

In June 2013, The BBC produced a new live recording at the Y Theatre in Leicester of the original 1951 story Dick Barton and the Trail of the Rocket, starring Tim Bentinck and Terry Molloy. It was released on CD by BBC Audio in July 2014, along with a number of bonus features.

== Films ==
Beginning in 1948, the Hammer film company made three Dick Barton films, which were intended to be the beginning of a long-running series. Don Stannard, the star, was killed in a car crash in 1949, and Hammer decided to discontinue the series after the production of only three films. Hammer shelved plans to film the next Dick Barton film, Dick Barton in Africa written by John Gilling.

- Dick Barton: Special Agent (1948)
- Dick Barton Strikes Back (1949)
- Dick Barton at Bay (1950)

== Television ==
In 1979, Southern Television, one of the smaller ITV Network Companies, made a series of Dick Barton - Special Agent which ran in an early evening slot on the ITV Network. Like the original, it ran in 15-minute segments and was again accompanied by the familiar theme tune, the titles playing against an animated dagger and target motif. The production was blighted by financial troubles, though, and some critics said it was a mistake to try to resurrect the character.

The cast of the show was Tony Vogel as Dick Barton, Anthony Heaton as Snowy White, James Cosmo as Jock Anderson and John Gatrell as Sir Richard Marley. The 32x15 minutes episodes were transmitted by most of the ITV network on Saturdays and Sundays between January and April 1979. Southern, however, screened the show across consecutive nights from Mondays through to Thursday in the radio series's original timeslot of 6.45 to 7.00pm.

- Adventure One written by Clive Exton, in ten parts. Demobbed after six years in the army, old friend Sir Richard Marley asks Barton to look into the disappearance of his daughter Virginia (Fiona Fullerton) and son Rex (Kevan Sheehan). They come up against master criminal, Melganik played by John G. Heller.
- Adventure Two written by Julian Bond, in eight parts. At a late night celebration at the "Blue Parrot", Barton and his colleagues rescue a young girl, Lucy Cameron (Debbie Farrington) from being attacked. She tells them that her father, George Cameron (Colin Rix) has been kidnapped by the evil Muller (Guy Deghy) who is after the deadly poison he has developed.
- Adventure Three written by Clive Exton, in six parts. Celebrating from the last adventure, Dick's Aunt Agatha (Stella Kemball) rings up and tells him that her house has vanished. A further phone call from Sir Richard Marley reveals that scientist, Harold Jenkins (Peter Godfrey) has perfected his ultimate weapon and Barton and comrades soon find themselves up against Melganik again.
- Adventure Four written by Julian Bond, in eight parts. Dandy Parkes (Terence Seward), a middle-aged playboy and Amanda Aston (Marsha Fitzalan), wife of a respected Whitehall official are threatened by the Drew Brothers (Ernie Drew by Bernard Kay).

The complete series was released on DVD in March 2009, and in 2010 re-runs of Dick Barton were shown on the British satellite television channel Film 24. By 2016 it had reappeared on Talking Pictures TV.

== Stage musical ==
A stage musical, Dick Barton Episode I, Special Agent, written by Phil Willmott, directed by Ted Craig. Musical direction was by Stefan Bednarczyk. It premièred at the Warehouse Theatre in December 1998 to great acclaim. It was revived in 1999 and productions then toured Britain between 1998 and 2001. Following its success, further "episodes" were written and performed at the Warehouse Theatre:

- December 1999 was Dick Barton Episode II, The Curse of the Pharaoh's Tomb by Phil Willmott. Musical direction was by Stefan Bednarczyk. This was commissioned by and premièred at the Warehouse Theatre.
- December 2001 was Dick Barton Episode III, The Tango of Terror by Phil Willmott. Musical direction by Stefan Bednarczyk. Commissioned by and premièred at the Warehouse Theatre. It later toured to Yvonne Arnaud Theatre, Guilford & Swan Theatre, Stratford-upon-Avon.
- December 2002 was Dick Barton Episode IV, The Flight of the Phoenix by Duncan Wisbey and Stefan Bednarcxyk, directed by Ted Craig. Commissioned by and premièred at the Warehouse Theatre.
- December 2003 was Dick Barton Episode V, The Excess of Evil by Duncan Wisbey and Stefan Bednarcyk, directed by Ted Craig. Commissioned by and premièred at the Warehouse Theatre.
- December 2006 was Young Dick Barton by Duncan Wisbey, lyrics by Stefan Bednarczyk and directed by Ted Craig. Commissioned by and premièred at the Warehouse Theatre.
- December 2008 was Young Dick Barton Episode II, The Devil Wears Tweed by Duncan Wisbey. Music and lyrics by Stefan Bednarczyk. Commissioned by and premièred at the Warehouse Theatre.
- December 2009 was Dick Barton, Quantum of Porridge by Duncan Wisbey. Music and lyrics by Stefan Bednarczyk. Commissioned by and premièred at the Warehouse Theatre.
- December 2010 was Dick Barton, A Fist Full of Barton by Kit Benjamin and Philip Ives, musical director was Stefan Bednarczyk. Commissioned by and premièred at the Warehouse Theatre.

== CD releases ==
The BBC's 1972 remake of the very first Dick Barton serial has been available to buy on BBC CD and tape for many years. For some time, this was the only Dick Barton radio material that was commercially available, having been recovered from a recording made by a member of the public, but this has now changed.

In February 2011, BBC Radio 4 and a number of national newspapers reported that 338 episodes of Dick Barton recorded in the late 1940s had been found in Australia's National Film and Sound Archive. These re-recordings, using the original BBC scripts and music cues, starred Douglas Kelly as Barton with Moira Carleton, Clifford Cowley, Richard Davies, William Lloyd and Patricia Kennedy. BBC Worldwide's audio arm have released a number of these on CD.

The Dick Barton radio series was later relaunched in the UK on BBC Radio 4 Extra (formerly BBC Radio 7) and further Dick Barton CDs have been announced by AudioGO (using the NFSA recordings).

The following Dick Barton dramas are now available to buy on CD (or as downloads) via BBC Audio:

1 STORY 1: 'Dick Barton and the Secret Weapon' (AKA 'Dick Barton: Special Agent) written by Edward J. Mason and originally broadcast 1946. The serial was re-recorded in November 1972 with much of the original cast. This is the 1972 version. (RELEASED: 1989) (RE-RELEASED: 2001 and 2009)

2 STORY 2: 'Dick Barton and the Paris Adventure' (which takes place right after "The Secret Weapon") written by Edward J. Mason. This recording was originally broadcast in Australia 14 March - 14 April 1949; original United Kingdom transmission dates are unknown at this time. (RELEASED: April 2011)

3 STORY 3: 'Dick Barton and the Cabatolin Diamonds' (which takes place right after "The Paris Adventure") written by Geoffrey Webb. This recording was originally broadcast in Australia 18 April - 19 May 1949; original United Kingdom transmission dates are unknown at this time. (RELEASED: April 2011)

4 STORY 6: 'Dick Barton and the Smash and Grab Raiders' written by Ronnie and Arthur Colley. This recording was originally broadcast in the United Kingdom 24 February - 12 March 1947 and in Australia August - September 1949. (RELEASED: 3 November 2011)

5 STORY 7: 'Dick Barton and the Tibetan Adventure' (which takes place right after "The Smash and Grab Raiders") written by Edward J. Mason. This recording was originally broadcast in the United Kingdom 24 March - 18 April 1947 and in Australia 19 September - 14 October 1949. (RELEASED: 3 November 2011)

6 STORY 9: 'Dick Barton and the Affair of the Black Panther' written by Geoffrey Webb. This recording was originally broadcast in the United Kingdom 10–31 May 1947 and in Australia 3 November - December 1949. (RELEASED: 5 January 2012)

7 STORY 10: 'Dick Barton and the Vulture' (which takes place right after "The Affair of the Black Panther") written by Edward J. Mason. This story was first broadcast in the United Kingdom 29 September 1947 – 24 October 1947. Australian broadcast dates are unknown. (RELEASED: 5 January 2012)

8 STORY 13: 'Dick Barton and the Li-Chang Adventure' written by Edward J. Mason. This story was first broadcast in the United Kingdom 22 December 1947 – 23 January 1948. Australian broadcast dates are unknown. (RELEASED: 5 APRIL 2012)

9 STORY 14: 'Dick Barton and the Case of Conrad Ruda' (which takes place right after "The Li-Chang Adventure") written by Basil Dawson. This story was first broadcast in the United Kingdom 26 January 1948 – 20 February 1948. Australian broadcast dates are unknown. (RELEASED: 5 APRIL 2012)

10 STORY 16: 'Dick Barton and the Firefly Adventure' written by Edward J. Mason & Produced by Morris West. This story was first broadcast in the United Kingdom sometime in 1950; actual transmission dates are unknown at this time. Australian broadcast dates are unknown. (RELEASED: 3 SEPTEMBER 2015)

Dick Barton - Special Agent: LIVE:

11 STORY 39: 'Dick Barton and the Trail of the Rocket' written by Bertie Chapman. (RELEASED: July 2014)

All of the above, including the BBC Radio documentary "Dick Barton: Still a Special Agent", have been released together for audio download as "Dick Barton: Special Agent - The Complete BBC Radio Collection" by Audible.
