= Barney Rogan =

American film editor

Barney Rogan, a.k.a. Bernard Rogan, was a film editor in the 1920–1940 era.

== Filmography ==
- 1940 A Miracle on Main Street
- 1933 Hotel Variety
- 1931 The Struggle
- 1931 Tarnished Lady
- 1931 The Girl Habit
- 1930 Queen High
- 1930 Follow the Leader
- 1929 The Cocoanuts
