= Salute John Citizen =

- Directed by: Maurice Elvey
- Written by: Elizabeth Baron (scenario); Clemence Dane (uncredited); Robert Greenwood (dialogue)
- Based on: the novels Mr. Bunting and Mr. Bunting at War by Robert Greenwood
- Produced by: Wallace Orton
- Starring: Edward Rigby; Stanley Holloway; George Robey; Mabel Constanduros; Jimmy Hanley
- Cinematography: James Wilson
- Edited by: Jack Harris
- Music by: Kennedy Russell
- Production company: British National Films
- Distributed by: Anglo-American Film Corporation (UK)
- Release date: 14 August 1942 (London)
- Running time: 96 minutes
- Country: United Kingdom
- Language: English

Salute John Citizen is a 1942 black and white British drama film directed by Maurice Elvey and starring Edward Rigby, Mabel Constanduros and Jimmy Hanley. It was written by Elizabeth Baron and Robert Greenwood based on the Mr. Bunting novels by Robert Greenwood. The Bunting family face up to the fortunes of war during the Second World War.

== Plot ==
The life of an ordinary family during the London Blitz. In the summer before that explosive September, elderly clerk Mr. Bunting loses his job at the department store where he's worked for over 40 years. George Bunting is the head of a happy home, with wife Mary, daughter Julie, and two sons, Chris and Ernest. When the Blitz hits London, we observe its effect on the family, and how they cope with the crisis. Mr. Bunting is rehired in his former job due to the shortage of manpower, though little else in his life is positive. Daughter Julie goes to work in a factory. The London blitz destroys everything in sight, and one of his sons, Chris, is killed. In the wake of this destruction, his other son, Ernest is converted from pacifism to the war effort.

== Cast ==
- Edward Rigby as Mr. Bunting
- Mabel Constanduros as Mrs. Bunting
- Jimmy Hanley as Ernest Bunting
- Eric Micklewood as Chris Bunting
- Peggy Cummins as Julie Bunting
- Dinah Sheridan as Evie
- Charles Deane as Bert Rollo
- Stanley Holloway as Oskey
- George Robey as Corder
- David Keir as Turner

== Reception ==
According to Kinematograph Weekly the film "gave its backers a good run for their money" at the British box office in September 1942.

The Monthly Film Bulletin wrote: "This film is so sincerely made and so well acted, especially by Edward Rigby as Mr. Bunting, that it is moving to a degree. The method of presentation, using a neighbour as the storyteller, may jar, but it was put to good use in covering war sequences. It should appeal with especial interest to the large part of the population of this country who have themselves enjoyed and suffered peace and war in similar circumstances to those which surrounded Mr. Bunting. The illusion of reality is disturbingly convincing. There is no doubt at all that it is all British."

TV Guide noted "a nice little film – a simple telling of a modest family's attempts to cope with ongoing conflict."

In his book Typical Men: The Representation of Masculinity in Popular British Cinema, Andrew Spicer concluded that the film's "popularity was limited by its obviously frugal budget, and uncharismatic central star."
