= Don Chicago =

1945 British film by Maclean Rogers

- Directed by: Maclean Rogers
- Screenplay by: Austin Melford
- Based on: Don Chicago by C. E. Bechhofer Roberts
- Produced by: Louis H. Jackson
- Starring: Jackie Hunter; Eddie Gray; Joyce Heron
- Cinematography: Gerald Gibbs
- Edited by: Grace Garland
- Music by: Percival Mackey
- Production company: British National Films
- Distributed by: Anglo-American Film Corporation (UK)
- Release date: 6 August 1945 (UK)
- Running time: 80 minutes
- Country: United Kingdom
- Language: English

Don Chicago is a 1945 British second feature ('B') crime comedy film directed by Maclean Rogers and starring Jackie Hunter, Joyce Heron and Claud Allister. The screenplay was by Austin Melford based on the 1944 novel of the same title by C. E. Bechhofer Roberts.

== Plot ==
Don Chicago, and aspiring but timid gangster, is forced to leave the United States after crossing the wrong people, and on arrival in Britain he is treated as a dangerous criminal. He steals the Crown Jewels from the Tower of London, and infiltrates the BBC to make various announcements.

== Cast ==
- Jackie Hunter as Don Chicago
- Eddie Gray as Police Constable Gray
- Joyce Heron as Kitty Mannering
- Claud Allister as Lord Piccadilly
- Amy Veness as Bowie Knife Bella
- Wylie Watson as Peabody
- Don Stannard as Ken Cressing
- Charles Farrell as Don Dooley
- Finlay Currie as Bugs Mulligan
- Cyril Smith as Flash Kelly
- Ellen Pollock as Lady Vanessa
- Moira Lister as telephone operator
- Wally Patch as sergeant
- Inga Andersen

== Reception ==
The Monthly Film Bulletin wrote: "This film has some amusing moments, but script and production as a whole lack the slickness and pace which will turn an improbable story into a first-class farce. Jackie Hunter bears the main burden of the acting in the title role and shows promise as a film comedian, but the rest of the cast are given few opportunities to provide him with effective support."

Kine Weekly wrote: "Exuberant gangster burlesque, with bright vaudeville intermissions ... The biggest laughs, and fortunately, these are very plentiful, come when Jackie Hunter and Monsewer Eddie Gray are permitted to improvise and introduce their well known radio, cabaret and music hall acts. In effect a two-man show."

In British Sound Films: The Studio Years 1928–1959 David Quinlan rated the film as "mediocre", writing: "Possibiities of comedy defeated by quality of the material."
