= Charles S. Zane =

American judge

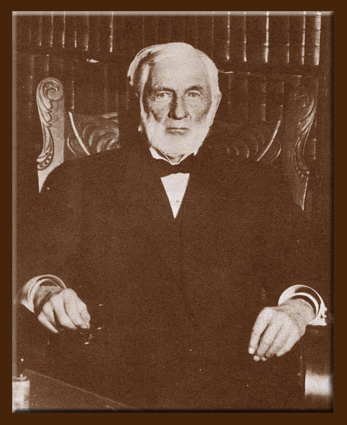

13th Chief Justice of the Utah Territory Supreme Court
- In office 1884–1888
- Nominated by: Shelby M. Cullom
- Appointed by: Chester A. Arthur
- Preceded by: John A. Hunter
- Succeeded by: Elliott Sandford

15th Chief Justice of the Utah Territory Supreme Court
- In office 1889–1894
- Appointed by: Benjamin Harrison
- Preceded by: Elliott Sandford
- Succeeded by: Samuel A. Merritt

1st Chief Justice of the Utah Supreme Court
- In office 1896–1899
- Preceded by: none
- Succeeded by: George W. Bartch

Personal details
- Born: Charles Shuster Zane; March 2, 1831 Cumberland County, New Jersey
- Died: March 29, 1915 (aged 84) Salt Lake City, Utah

Charles Shuster Zane (March 2, 1831 – March 29, 1915) was a legal associate of Abraham Lincoln, an anti-polygamy judge in the Territorial Supreme Court in Utah Territory, and the first chief justice of the Utah Supreme Court after statehood.

== Early life and education ==
Charles S. Zane was born in Cumberland County, New Jersey, United States. on March 2, 1831. He moved to Sangamon County, Illinois in the 1850s and worked on a farm before going to school at McKendree College in Lebanon, Illinois. After graduating, he taught school around the state.

== Illinois law career ==
Zane went to Springfield, Illinois in July 1856. He was admitted to practice law 1857. He was elected city attorney in 1858, 1860, and 1865. He applied to study law at Abraham Lincoln's firm, but was turned down. After Lincoln's election to President of the United States, however, Zane replaced him as William H. Herndon's law partner. Zane later partnered with Shelby M. Cullom, until elected Illinois' Fifth Circuit judge, a post he filled from 1875 to 1883.

== Utah Supreme Court ==
Republican President Chester A. Arthur appointed Zane chief justice of the Utah Territory Supreme Court in 1884. He had been nominated by Senator Cullom.

Zane arrived in August 1884, and was assigned to the Third Judicial District (Salt Lake City), as well as his Supreme Court post. Zane made his name as an opponent of polygamy with his sentencing of Rudger Clawson, who had been convicted of both polygamy and illegal cohabitation.

Zane convicted hundreds of people for illegal cohabitation or polygamy. To most Mormons, Zane seemed a fanatic bent on destroying thousands of families, along with the church itself. The Deseret News called Zane's actions part of a "judicial anti-Mormon crusade."

Prior Utah Supreme Court Chief Justices, including James B. McKean, commissioned in 1870, had tried to fight polygamy, but met with little success, since the elected officials and members of grand jury panels were Mormons and supporters of polygamy. Sen. George Edmunds of Vermont, a leading critic of polygamy, pushed a bill in 1882 that disenfranchised polygamists and called for an electoral commission to supervise Utah elections. The Edmunds Act, strengthened by the Edmunds–Tucker Act of 1887 which dissolved the corporation of the LDS church, became the legal tool Zane could use against polygamists.

Zane continued his prosecutions until July 1888, when the more lenient Elliott Sandford replaced him on the high court. In May 1889, Zane was returned to the bench by President Benjamin Harrison and resumed polygamy prosecutions. LDS President Wilford Woodruff's 1890 Manifesto renounced polygamy, and Zane said he regarded the manifesto "as an authoritative expression of the Church of Jesus Christ of Latter-Day Saints against the practice of polygamy." The cases continued, however.

When his term ended in 1893 he remained in Utah. He was one of the first three justices elected to the Utah State Supreme Court, serving from 1896 to 1899.

He died in the home of his daughter, Margaret Zane Cherdon, in Salt Lake City, on March 29, 1915.
