= Joan Maude =

British actress (1908–1998)

- photograph by Madame Yevonde, 1932
- Born: 16 January 1908; Rickmansworth, Hertfordshire, England, UK
- Died: 28 September 1998 (aged 90); Lewes, East Sussex, England, UK
- Occupation: actress
- Years active: 1920s-1950s

Joan Maude (16 January 1908 – 28 September 1998) was an English actress, active from the 1920s to the 1950s. She is probably best known for playing the Chief Recorder in the 1946 Powell and Pressburger film A Matter of Life and Death.

The daughter of actors Charles Maude and Nancy Price, Maude's great-grandmother on her father's side was the singer Jenny Lind, known as the "Swedish Nightingale". Maude was a cousin of the actor-manager Cyril Maude.

Maude married firstly Scottish Rugby International player and journalist Frank Waters (1909-1954), with whom she had a daughter. In 1956, she married Oliver Woods (1911-1972). She was the writer, producer, and production designer of the short film All Hallowe'en (1952).

Her mother, an author, and an actress, published a book Behind the Night-Light: The By-World of a Child of Three in 1912, recording 'faithfully' the beasts and animals Joan imagined as a 3-year-old.

== Filmography ==
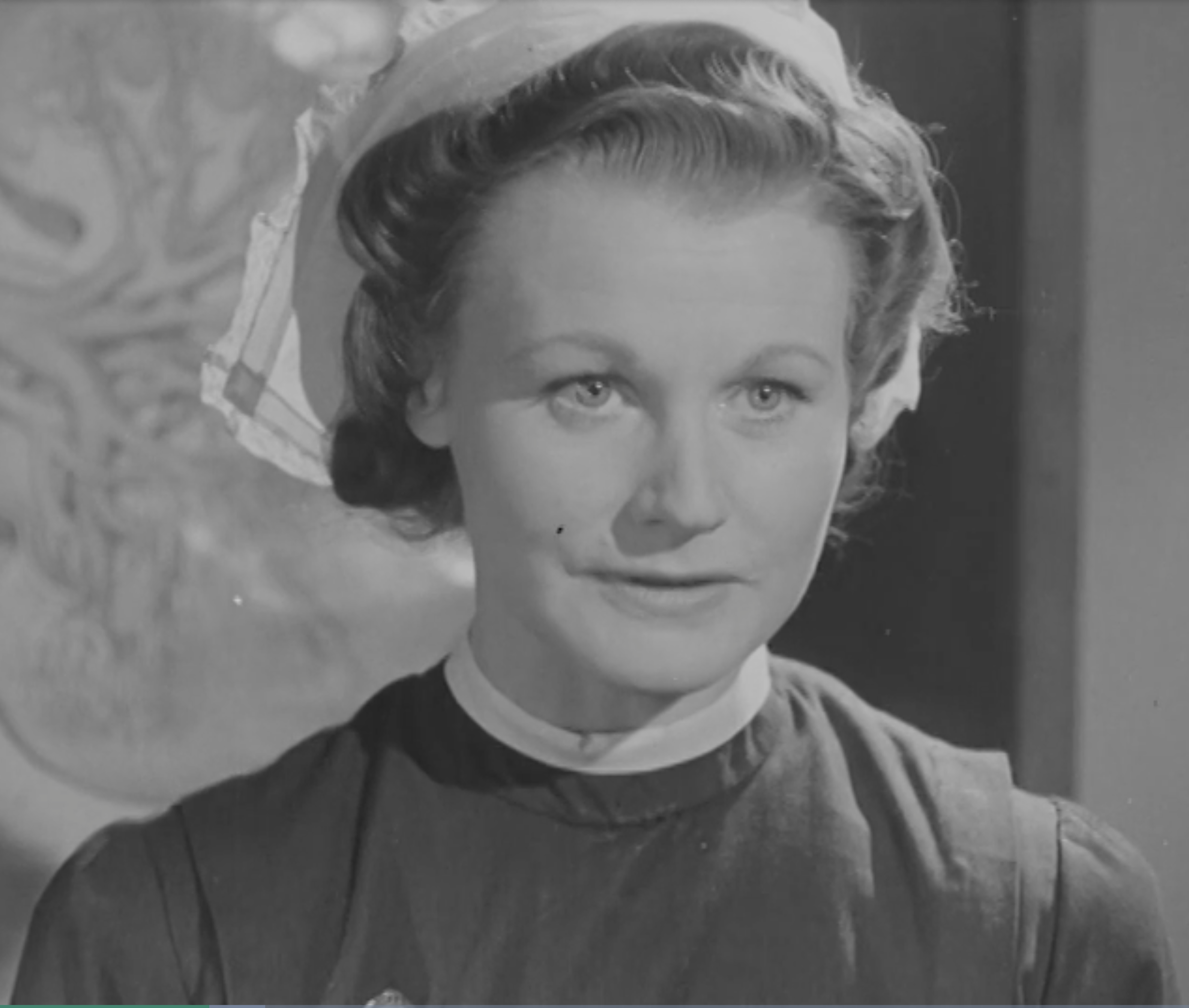
As Sister Tutor in Life in Her Hands (1951)

- This Freedom (1923) - Hilda
- Next Gentleman Please (1927) - Fortune-teller
- Chamber of Horrors (1929)
- One Family (1930) - The Mother
- Hobson's Choice (1931) - Alice Hobson
- In a Monastery Garden (1932) - Roma Romano
- The Wandering Jew (1933/I) - Gianella
- It's a King (1933) - Princess Yasma
- Menace (1934/II) - Lady Conway
- The Lash (1934) - Dora Bush
- The King of Paris (1934) - Lea Rossignol
- Jud Süß (1934) - Magdalen Sibylle
- Turn of the Tide (1935) - Amy Lunn
- The Lamp Still Burns (1943) - Sister Catley
- Strawberry Roan (1944) - Gladys Moon
- Great Day (1945) - Miss Allen
- The Rake's Progress (1945) - Alice
- They Knew Mr. Knight (1946) - Carrie Porritt
- Night Boat to Dublin (1946) - Sidney Vane
- A Matter of Life and Death (1946) - Chief Recorder
- Corridor of Mirrors (1948) - Caroline Hart
- The Temptress (1949) - Lady Clifford
- Life in Her Hands (1951) - Sister Tutor
- The Scarlet Pimpernel - Duchess of Northumberland in the episode The Imaginary Invalid (1956)
