= Tamara Geva =

Soviet-American actress and dancer (1906–1997)

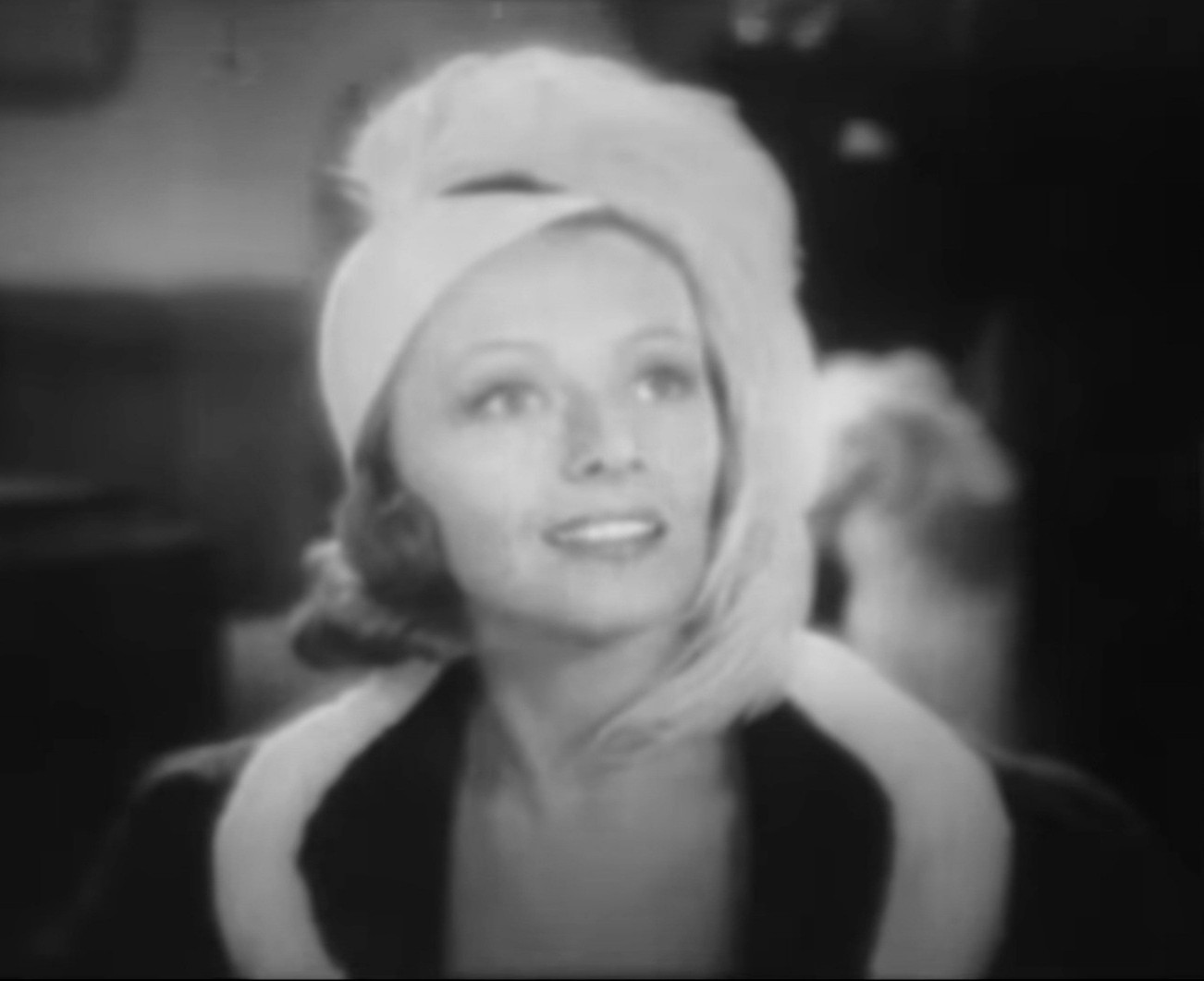
- Geva in Manhattan Merry-Go-Round (1937)
- Born: Tamara Zheverzheeva; 17 March 1906; St. Petersburg, Russian Empire
- Died: 9 December 1997 (aged 91); New York City, U.S.
- Citizenship: Russian; American
- Occupations: Actress; ballet dancer; choreographer
- Years active: 1924–1983
- Spouses: George Balanchine (m. 1921; div. 1926) Kapa Davidoff (divorced) John Emery (m. 1942; div. 1963)

Tamara Geva (Russian: Тамара Жева, born Tamara Levkievna Zheverzheeva, Russian: Тамара Левкиевна Жевержеева; 17 March 1906 – 9 December 1997) was a Soviet and later an American actress, ballet dancer, and choreographer. She was the daughter of art patron and collector Levkiy Gevergeyev and was the first wife of the well-known ballet dancer and choreographer George Balanchine.

Throughout her life, she danced with Diaghilev's Ballets Russes and with husband George Balanchine and performed in and choreographed many notable Broadway shows, as well as Hollywood movies.

== Family and early life ==
Tamara Geverzheeva was born in St. Petersburg, Russian Empire on March 17, 1906. Geva's mother Tamara Urtahl was an actress, while her father Levkiy Gevergeyev was a passionate collector and art enthusiast.

Levkiy Gevergeyev was known as a freethinker. He sponsored Russian avant garde artists and their projects through his enthusiasm for artistry. Geva described her mother, Tamara Urthal, as a beautiful but selfish woman. Her parents were unable to marry until their daughter was six years old. As a child, she lived in a huge, 19th-century house (Ivan Zheverzheev's house at Rubinstein Street, 18) which had an extensive art, book, and theater collection, as well as a miniature theater all organized by her father and his years of collecting such artifacts. Her father had agents all over who found art, writings, and artifacts from a variety of well-known artists to add to his massive collection. Geva has said that this collection was her father's most prized possession. After his death, his extensive theatre memorabilia collection was put into an exhibit at Saint Petersburg State Museum of Theater and Music.

Geva grew up in the midst of the Bolshevik Revolution, in which she experienced true hardships in her youth. Her father's fortune was taken away by the Bolsheviks, so sometimes they struggled to find food and lived on a verge of starvation.

== Training and early career ==
Geva fell in love with ballet when she was taken by her father to the Mariinsky Theatre and saw La Esmeralda danced by Mathilde Kschessinska. However open-minded, her parents forbade Geva to go to ballet school. Still, she was allowed to take private lessons.

At age 13, Geva began to attend evening dance classes at the St. Petersburg's Mariinsky Theatre School, when it began to accept older students shortly after the revolution. Her teachers were Evgenia Sokolova and Alexander & Ivan Chekrygin. Here, she met dancer and choreographer George Balanchine, who at the time was the teacher for the ballroom dance classes. Balanchine and she became close very soon, and he began choreographing pieces for them both. One of the first things they did was La Nuit to Anton Rubinstein's Romance in E-flat.

Geva and Balanchine began appearing together professionally in ballet concerts. From 1921, Balanchine managed his own company, the Young Ballet. Though stuffed with promising and talented dancers, the company struggled in Soviet Russia. Tamara married Balanchine in 1924, when she was 17 years old. According to the family legend, the parents agreed on this marriage when Balanchine played Wagner to Levkiy, who adored this composer.

== Emigration ==
Their tour turned out to be a disaster. All performances in Berlin were met coldly, The Young Ballet had to perform in small cities of the Rhine Province such as Wiesbaden, Bad Ems, and Moselle. Geva wrote later that in that time they had to dance ‘in small dark places, in summer theaters and private ballrooms, in beer gardens and before mental patients‘. They could barely afford paying for hotels and often had only tea for meal. In London, they had two weeks of very unsuccessful performances, when the audience met them with dead silence. With expiring visas, they weren't welcome in any other European country, as the last resort remained in France.

In 1924, the couple met Anton Dolin, one of Sergei Diaghilev's star dancers. Dolin suggested that they audition for Diaghilev's Ballets Russes. According to other sources, Diaghilev met them in Misia Sert's salon. The impresario hired all dancers of the Young Ballet and they joined the Ballets Russes. With the Ballets Russes, Geva performed in The Triumph of Neptune in 1926, where she wore a costume made of tiny mirrors that weighed 75 pounds. Geva remembered Diaghilev as having a superior air at all times and that he would often look down upon others, but he could also turn his charm on at any time he needed it. Diaghilev often stuck Geva in the corps de ballet, only sometimes she received little solos. By 1926, her marriage to Balanchine became shaky; while he enjoyed life in Monte Carlo under the wing of Diaghilev, she felt trapped and longed for more. She wanted to rise above ballet and try herself in cinema and theater. Finally, in 1926, she left Balanchine and accepted Nikita Balieff's offer to join his La Chauve-Souris. Despite the split, Geva and Balanchine remained friends and collaborated later in life.

=== USA ===
In 1927, Geva left Europe and made her way to America while touring with Chauve-Souris. She introduced Balanchine's choreography to New York City, where she danced three solos choreographed for her by him. She premiered these three pieces entitled Romanesque, Grotesque Espagnol with music by Albeniz, and Sarcasms with music by Prokofiev at the Cosmopolitan Theatre and was called "a Russian star". After this, Geva began performing with the Ziegfeld Follies.

Later, Geva transitioned towards Broadway, where she appeared in a number of notable musicals between 1925 and 1953, including Three's a Crowd (1930), Flying Colors (1932) and Whoopee! (1934). She cherished her time on Broadway as a performer, but she also got the chance to choreograph many numbers in these productions. She choreographed the "Talkative Toes" dance for Three's a Crowd and "Two Faced Woman" in Flying Colors.

In 1935, Geva performed with the American Ballet, Balanchine's ballet company in New York. She performed in their first performance, where she danced in Errante with music by Schubert. She later immersed herself in film and theater work while staying in America. In 1936, she was paired with actor Ray Bolger in On Your Toes by Rodgers and Hart. In On Your Toes, she danced in the dramatic "Slaughter on Tenth Avenue" sequence and a balletic parody choreographed by Balanchine and composed by Dick Rodgers. New York Times reviewer Brooks Atkinson described her performance as "magnificent", adding, "she can burlesque it with the authority of an artist on holiday".

In 1938, she played the main part in Sherwood's Idiot's Delight staged in London.

She went on to act in productions of the works of Euripides, George Bernard Shaw, and Jean-Paul Sartre. She acted in Euripides' The Trojan Women, in which she played Helen of Troy in New York City in 1941 and in the Los Angeles production of Sartre's No Exit in 1947. She was the lead choreographer for Ben Hecht's film Specter of the Rose (1946), based on the Nijinsky legend. In 1953, Geva played the character of Lina Szczepanowska, a sarcastic acrobat, in a New York revival of George Bernard Shaw's Misalliance. The cast included Roddy McDowall and Richard Kiley.

In 1959, Geva and Haila Stoddard created Come Play With Me, a musical comedy with a score penned by Dana Suesse, which had had a short off-Broadway run.

In 1972, she released an autobiographical book entitled Split Seconds.

Her last performance was onscreen in Frevel (1983).

== Personal life ==
Geva was the first of Balanchine's four wives, all of whom were dancers. After their split in 1926, she could not officially divorce because all documents remained in the USSR. Later in the USA, Geva married Kapa Davidoff (né Garabed Tavitian; 1897-1982) in August 1931, although they had a religious ceremony two years prior; the couple divorced in June 1936. Davidoff was an actor and fashion executive. In 1942, Geva married again, this time to American actor John Emery, that union ended in divorce in 1963. Geva never had children.

Tamara Geva died on 9 December 1997, at the age of 91, at her home in Manhattan, from natural causes.

== Filmography ==
Year	Title	Role	Notes
1925	Wood Love	Oberon	
1925	Cock of the Roost	Jutta, Rombergs Tochter	
1925	Die unberührte Frau	Jane, ihre Mutter	
1926	Gräfin Plättmamsell		
1929	Zwischen vierzehn und siebzehn - Sexualnot der Jugend	Parent	
1931	The Girl Habit	Sonja Maloney	
1934	Their Big Moment	Madame Lottie Marvo	
1937	Manhattan Merry-Go-Round	Madame 'Charlie' Charlizzini	
1942	Orchestra Wives	Mrs. Beck	
1943	Night Plane from Chungking	Countess Olga Karagin	
1946	Specter of the Rose		Choreographer
1948	The Gay Intruders	Maria Ivar	
1951	The Adventures of Ellery Queen		Episode: "The Ballet Murder"
1951	The Web		Episode: "Golden Secret"
1978	Cartas de amor de una monja	Monja	
1979	Diaghilev: A Portrait	Narrator	
1984	Frevel	Bardame	(Final film role)

== Broadway credits ==
Year	Title	Role
1927	Chauve-Souris	Performer
1928	Whoopee!	Yolandi
1930	Three's a Crowd	Performer
1932	Flying Colors	Performer
1933	A Divine Drudge	Lania
1934	The Red Cat	Mimi
1935	Alma Mater	Performer
1936	On Your Toes	Princess Zenobia, Strip Tease Girl
1941	The Trojan Woman	Helen
1944	Peepshow	Leonie Cobbe
1950	Pride's Crossing	Zilla
1953	Misalliance	Lina Szczepanowska

== Memoir ==
- Geva, Tamara. Split Seconds: A Remembrance. Limelight Editions, 1972. ISBN 0060115122

== Sources ==
- Taper, Bernard (1996). Balanchine: A Biography. University of California Press. ISBN 9780520206397.
- Genné, B. (2018). Dance Me a Song: Astaire, Balanchine, Kelly, and the American Film Musical. New York: Oxford University Press. ISBN 978-0-19-062417-0.
- Polisadova, O. N. (2013). Балетмейстеры ХХ века : индивидуальный взгляд на развитие хореографического искусства [Ballet-master of XXth century: An Individual approach to choreography] (PDF) (in Russian). Vladimir State University. ISBN 978-5-9984-0395-8.
- Morgan, Charles (10 April 1938). "London on 'Idiot's Delights'". The New York Times.
- Farber, Donald C. (2014). I Hated To Do It: Stories of a Life. RosettaBooks. ISBN 9780795344794.
