= Bonnie Prince Charlie (1948 film) =

1948 British biographical film

- DVD cover
- Directed by: Anthony Kimmins uncredited Alexander Korda; Leslie Arliss; Robert Stevenson
- Written by: Clemence Dane
- Produced by: Edward Black; Alexander Korda; Herbert Mason (uncredited)
- Starring: David Niven; Margaret Leighton; Judy Campbell; Jack Hawkins
- Cinematography: Robert Krasker
- Edited by: Grace Garland
- Music by: Ian Whyte
- Production company: London Films
- Distributed by: British Lion Films
- Release dates: 26 October 1948 (United Kingdom, London); 6 January 1952 (US)
- Running time: 140 minutes (original cut); 118 mins
- Country: United Kingdom
- Language: English
- Budget: £760,000
- Box office: £175,311 (UK) or £94,327

Bonnie Prince Charlie is a 1948 British historical film directed by Anthony Kimmins for London Films depicting the 1745 Jacobite Rebellion and the role of Bonnie Prince Charlie within it. Filmed in Technicolor, it stars David Niven, Jack Hawkins, and Margaret Leighton.

== Plot ==
In 1745, Flora MacDonald plays a Jacobite song on the piano and is scolded by her stepfather for its seditious nature. In Italy, James, the Old Pretender, wants to make another attempt at regaining the throne of Great Britain (Scotland and England) and Ireland for the House of Stuart from the Hanoverian King George II, but, thinking that he is now too old, he has decided to send his son, Charles Edward, the Young Pretender.

Charles arrives in Scotland by ship and meets Donald, a Scottish shepherd, whom he asks to send a message to the Scottish nobles, asking them to meet him at his ship. Meanwhile, King George II is warned about the impending invasion but is not worried. Charles tries to persuade the nobles to fight for him and most agree, except for Lord MacDonald, who is concerned about the absence of the French support which had been promised. The clans rally to Charles, including Lord George Murray, and proclaim their loyalty to James. The rebellion begins. Charles is accompanied by another shepherd, Blind Jimmie.

Charles and his men enter Edinburgh in triumph. Clementina Walkinshaw throws him a rose and they meet at a dance and begin a romance. General Cope arrives with government troops and Lord Murray does not want to tell Charles about it, thinking little of his military ability, but the prince finds out. Charles recommends they attack and the Jacobite forces rapidly defeat the Government forces at the Battle of Prestonpans.

Charles and his forces then proceed into England. King George II starts to panic and sends his son, the Duke of Cumberland, to fight him. At Derby, only 127 miles from London, Lord Murray and the army council recommend a retreat, as further support has failed to materialise. Charles opposes this but the retreat goes ahead. Charles is upset and seeks solace with Clementina, who encourages him to leave for France with her, but he elects to stay with his men.

The Duke of Cumberland defeats the Highlanders at the Battle of Culloden but is unable to find and capture Charles. Charles flees to the islands with Donald, and is hidden by Flora MacDonald. MacDonald helps him evade the government troops looking for him, including taking him with her to Skye disguised as a woman servant. MacDonald keeps up Charles' spirits, and he manages to reach the boat sent to take him back to Italy.

== Cast ==
- David Niven as Bonnie Prince Charlie
- Margaret Leighton as Flora MacDonald
- Morland Graham as Donald MacDonald
- John Laurie as Blind Jimmie
- Jack Hawkins as Lord George Murray
- Judy Campbell as Clementina Walkinshaw
- Ronald Adam as Macleod
- Charles Goldner as Captain Ferguson
- Elwyn Brook-Jones as Duke of Cumberland
- Finlay Currie as Marquis of Tullibardine
- Herbert Lomas as Kinloch Moidart
- Hector Ross as Glenalandale
- John Longden as Colonel O'Sullivan
- Franklin Dyall as Macdonald
- Guy Le Feuvre as Cameron of Lochiel
- Stuart Lindsell as MacDonald of Armadale
- James Hayter as Kingsburgh
- Martin Miller as King George II
- G. H. Mulcaster as The Duke of Newcastle
- Torin Thatcher as Colonel Kor
- Hugh Kelly as Lieutenant Ingleby
- Henry Oscar as The Old Pretender

== Production ==
=== Development ===
In April 1936 Leslie Howard announced he wanted to make a film about Bonnie Prince Charlie. Two years later he said he would make it with Alexander Korda after his films of Lawrence of Arabia and Lord Nelson. "I am so in love with the story of Charles Edward that I would not undertake it unless I had time to adequately prepare and complete it", said Howard. Plans to make the film were delayed by World War II, in which Howard was killed. After the war Alexander Korda announced a Bonnie Prince Charlie project. Michael Powell was originally named as the director. Then in April it was announced that Leslie Arliss would direct and Ted Black would be borrowed from MGM to produce. No star was cast in the lead; the only person cast at all was Kieron Moore who would play Charlie's Irish adjutant.

David Niven became a front runner to play the part. He was a friend of Howard's before the latter's death. David Niven's casting was formally announced in May. At the time, David Niven said that he was keen to make the film as it gave him the chance to return to England, and he did not enjoy being in Hollywood after the death of his first wife. He was so enthusiastic he did a screen test in costume to persuade Samuel Goldwyn, who had Niven under contract, to loan him out to Alexander Korda, who was producing the film. Later on, however, Niven alleged he had been forced by Goldwyn to take the role. It was one of the few roles Niven played in his career without his moustache. He says Goldwyn received $150,000 from Korda for his services, although Niven only got a fraction of that.

Norman Ginsbury and Elizabeth Montgomery wrote the original script.

=== Location shooting ===
Filming took place on location in Scotland and at Shepperton Studios in London. Second unit filming began in August 1946 near Fort William. Doubles for the main cast were used as David Niven was unavailable until the spring. The budget was reported then as being £500,000. Doubles and extra were filmed raising the standard at Glenfinnan. Soldiers in the British Army were hired as extras, but complained they were not paid.

In March 1947 it was announced Robert Stevenson would be directing. Niven did not arrive in London until July 1947.

Korda's original choice to play Flora MacDonald was Deborah Kerr, but she had accepted a Hollywood contract and was unavailable for filming. Stage actress Margaret Leighton was cast instead. C. Aubrey Smith was meant to be in a supporting role but filming took so long to start he ended up returning to Hollywood.

=== Shooting ===
Filming finally began in August 1947. By now the script was by Clemence Dane and was to be in two parts, The Story about the '45, and The Legend about Charlie fleeing from the British. Filming took over nine months. By October Stevenson had been replaced as director by Anthony Kimmins, the official reason being a contractual obligation owed by Stevenson. Kimmins was still on the film in December 1947.

Kimmins also quit the film and was replaced by Korda himself. In November 1947 Ted Black reportedly walked off the film. However he is credited as sole producer on the movie. Will Fyffe collapsed during filming and was taken hospital; his scenes had to be re-shot with Morland Graham playing his part at an estimated cost of $100,000. Fyffe later died.

Niven later recalled the film without affection:

Bonnie Prince Charlie was one of those huge, florid extravaganzas that reek of disaster from the start. There was never a completed screenplay, and never during the eight months we were shooting were the writers more than two days ahead of the actors. In confusion we suffered three changes of directors, with Korda himself desperately taking over, and at one point I cabled Goldwyn: "I have now worked every day for five months on this picture and nobody can tell me how story ends. Advise." He didn't. He didn't even bother to answer. I loved Alex Korda, a brilliant, generous creature, but with this film he was wallowing in confusion. I felt sorry for him, but sorrier for myself as the Bonnie Prince who would assuredly bear the blame for the impending debacle.

However, Niven did meet his second wife during filming.

Variety gave the budget as US$4 million. The exact figure was £760,000 which made it one of the most expensive British films of all time.

=== Post-production ===
According to Emeric Pressburger's biographer, Pressburger and Michael Powell were asked by Korda to look at the film as a favor "to try and salvage it. It is difficult to say if they actually rewrote or reshot anything. More likely, Korda just wanted to take advantage of Emeric’s well-known incisiveness in structure and story in the editing room, but after a fortnight’s work, Emeric gave up in disgust."

== Reception ==
The film had its world premiere in Edinburgh in October 1948.

Harold Wilson later recalled that he attended the premiere as president of the Board of Trade:

Alex Korda had just made Bonnie Prince Charlie: a ghastly film actually, and we went to his very lush flat and they were all swooning around him, all the ladies. 'Oh Alex, absolutely marvellous’, and so forth. Then he came to me and said ‘Well Mr President, did you like it?’ and I said ‘Personally, I enjoyed it’. I said ‘Look, it cost you £750,000 and you won’t make £150,000 at the box office’. Fairly brash remark. I was wrong too, it made £151,000 at the box office. And he said, ‘Well, you wait ’til you see my next film, it is filmed in the sewers of Vienna’, and I said, ‘Alex I can’t wait’. How wrong I was. It was The Third Man.

=== Critical ===
it was poorly received by London film critics, most criticising it as dull and suggesting that David Niven was miscast. However, Margaret Leighton received acclaim for her performance. Variety called it "long ponderous and often boring". Alex Korda took out paid advertisements defending the film and criticising the critics.

=== Box office ===
The film failed to recoup its cost at the box office. As of 30 June 1949 the film earned £155,570 in the UK of which £94,327 went to the producer. According to records the film had made a loss of £665,673.

Producer Edward Black died not long after the premiere.

=== US release ===
In 1948 20th Century Fox agreed to distribute in the US. However the US release was delayed, along with other Korda productions, out of fear of anti-British protests from American-Jewish groups opposed to British policy in Palestine. The film was finally released in the US in 1952.

The New York Times said "what a paucity of drama and of genuine excitement there is in the midst of this pretty lot of scenery and stilted pageantry!"

== Home media ==
The film was released on DVD on 14 March 2011.

== Proposed Film ==
In 2013 it was announced Ewan McGregor and Kate Hudson would star in Born To Be King, a movie written and directed by Peter Capaldi about the making of Bonnie Prince Charlie with McGregor as an extra who looks like Niven and Hudson as a Hollywood actress. As of 2025 the film has not been made.
