= Dick Barton Strikes Back =

1949 British film by Godfrey Grayson

- Directed by: Godfrey Grayson
- Written by: Elizabeth Baron and Ambrose Grayson, based on a story by Ambrose Grayson
- Produced by: Anthony Hinds; Mae Murray
- Starring: Don Stannard; Sebastian Cabot
- Cinematography: Cedric Williams
- Edited by: Ray Pitt
- Music by: Rupert Grayson; Frank Spencer
- Production company: Hammer Film Productions
- Distributed by: Exclusive Films
- Release dates: 18 July 1949 (United Kingdom); 4 May 1950 (United States)
- Running time: 73 minutes
- Country: United Kingdom
- Language: English

Dick Barton Strikes Back is a 1949 British second feature ('B') spy film directed by Godfrey Grayson and starring Don Stannard. It was written by Elizabeth Baron and Ambrose Grayson and was the third of three films that Hammer Film Productions made about agent Dick Barton, although it was the second one to be released. The film was trade shown on March 7, 1949, and on July 9th, Don Stannard was killed in a car accident, after which the film was released on July 18th, 1949. The second film in the series, Dick Barton at Bay, had actually been completed earlier in 1948, but perhaps because of Stannard's untimely death, it was only released (as the third film in the series) in 1950.

== Plot ==
Captain Richard 'Dick' Barton and his sidekick Snowey White, uncover a ring of international psychopathic spies with plans to dominate Great Britain, if not the world, using a terrifying weapon of mass destruction.

== Cast ==
- Don Stannard as Dick Barton
- Bruce Walker as Snowey White
- Sebastian Cabot as Fouracada
- James Raglan as Lord Armadale
- Jean Lodge as Tina
- Morris Sweden as Robert Creston
- John Harvey as Major Henderson
- Humphrey Kent as Colonel Gardener
- Sidney Vivian as Inspector Burke
- Tony Morelli as Nicholas
- George Crawford as Alex
- Larry Taylor as Nick (as Laurie Taylor)

== Production ==
The film's working title during production was Dick Barton and the Silent Plague.

== Critical reception ==
The Monthly Film Bulletin wrote: "A large cast, headed by Don Stannard as Barton, with Sebastian Cabot and James Raglan as the leading criminals, enter into the spirit of adventure with enthusiasm. Nerves would have to be strong to resist the fearful screaming of the mystery apparatus, though even an enthusiastic child might find some of the suspense almost beyond bearing."

Kine Weekly wrote: "A lot is left unexplained, but the zest with which the schoolboy hokum is put over, plus generous and colourful staging, amply atones for story shortcomings. Good fun, and an exhilitrating thriller, it will entertain most audiences and youngsters in particular."

In British Sound Films: The Studio Years 1928–1959 David Quinlan rated the film as "average", writing: "Enthusiastic juvenalia."

Mystery File wrote: "This is a little kid's idea of a Spy Movie, with transparent trickery, obvious "surprise" villains and character development just below the level of a CLUE game, but it was clearly also the precursor of the James Bond films, with the suave, hard-fighting hero flung in and out of the clutches of sinister villains and predatory females with equal aplomb. It's a time-waster, sure, but a fun thing, with death rays, a sinister carnival and a really gripping final set-to up and down a (rather unsettlingly phallic) tower."

The Spinning Image found "an excellent example of pure pulp cinema, Dick Barton Strikes Back is solidly entertaining and never flags, right up to the finish line."

TV Guide called it "the best of the three Dick Barton films".
