= Frank Spencer (composer) =

British film music composer

Frank Spencer (1911–1975) was a British film music composer.

== Selected filmography ==
- The Jack of Diamonds (1949)
- The Adventures of PC 49 (1949)
- Celia (1949)
- Dick Barton Strikes Back (1949)
- Room to Let (1950)
- Cloudburst (1951)
- To Have and to Hold (1951)
- Two on the Tiles (1951)
- The Dark Light (1951)
- A Case for PC 49 (1951)
- The Rossiter Case (1951)
- Death of an Angel (1952)
- The Last Page (1952)
- Whispering Smith Hits London (1952)
- Laxdale Hall (1953)
