= John Hunter (singer) =

American singer and musician

- Origin: Chicago, Illinois
- Genres: Pop, rock
- Occupations: Singer, Songwriter
- Instruments: Vocals, Keyboards
- Years active: 1970s - present
- Labels: Private I, Epic Records

John Hunter (born 1949) is an American singer and musician. He is best known for his 1984 single, "Tragedy", which peaked at No. 39 on the Billboard Hot 100 the following year.

== Career ==
Inspired by artists such as Bob Dylan, Lennon and McCartney, Joni Mitchell, and others, Hunter sought to become a "rock poet," creating music that "could really move you with... lyrics and melodies". He earned a degree in English Literature from Northwestern University.

Remaining in Chicago, Hunter soon became a founding member of 1970s band The Hounds, who recorded two albums on Columbia Records. Following a lack of commercial success with these albums, the group broke up at the end of the decade, with Hunter retreating into songwriting again. Although there were occasional Hounds reunions in the years that immediately followed, Hunter largely stayed out of the spotlight until deciding to pursue a solo career. In 1984, he released his debut solo album, Famous at Night, which featured instrumental backing from former Hounds bandmates Glen Rupp (guitar) and Joe Cuttone (bass), along with former Heartsfield drummer Artie Baldacci. The album spawned the single, "Tragedy", his only top-40 hit on the Billboard Hot 100. His 1986 follow-up album More Than Meets the Eye, despite featuring the upbeat, synth-punctuated leadoff single, "Why Does It Have to Rain?", was less successful.

Following his entertainment career, he spent the next 25 years in the biotech industry. He currently lives on his ranches in Temecula, California, with his family and his horses.

== Discography ==
=== Solo albums ===
- 1984: Famous at Night
- 1986: More Than Meets the Eye

=== Singles ===
- 1984: "Tragedy" (released December 1984; peaked at #39 on February 16, 1985)
- 1984: "Horses"
- 1985: "Valentine"
- 1986: "Why Does It Have to Rain?"
- 1986: "High Feelings"
