= Jock Hunter =

Scottish footballer

Personal information
- Full name: John Hunter
- Date of birth: 1875
- Place of birth: Paisley, Scotland
- Date of death: 1950 (aged 78–79)
- Position: Wing half

Senior career*
Years	Team	Apps	(Gls)
1894–1896	Troon Academicals		
1896	St Mirren	10	(1)
1896–1899	Preston North End	16	(0)
1899–1900	Portsmouth		
1901	Distillery		
Total		26	(1)
- * Club domestic league appearances and goals

John Hunter (1875 – 1950) was a Scottish footballer who played in the Football League for Preston North End.
