= Jackie Hunter (entertainer) =

Canadian actor, singer, musician (1903–1951)

Jackie Hunter (29 September 1903 – 21 November 1951), born John Hunter, was a Canadian actor, singer, musician and entertainer known for starring in the 1945 films Don Chicago, as the eponymous hero, and Give Me the Stars as Lyle Mitchell.

In 1943 Hunter appeared in the London West End Lyric Theatre production of the musical revue Flying Colours, co-starring with Binnie Hale and Douglas Byng. Between 1941 and 1948 he was a regular comedian and singer, or compere, on the BBC Home Service, General Forces Programme and the Light Programme, chiefly with Geraldo and his Orchestra and Geraldo's Open House. His other BBC shows included All the Fun of the Fair, Ensa's Over to You, and Starlight, Navy Mixture, Music-Hall, Variety Bandbox, Monday Night at Eight, Up and Doing, Round the Halls, Scrapbook For 1925, Dance Cabaret, Canadian Capers, Du Barry Was a Lady, and the music comedy programme Big Time with Arthur Askey and Florence Desmond, which was first aired on 15 February 1942 on the BBC Forces Programme. He also played drums while with Geraldo.

On 7 June 1946 Hunter was featured as an entertainer in the Variety Party element of the reopening of the BBC Television Service programme. On 1 July the same year he appeared, billed as 'the Canadian Comedian', in BBC TV programme Variety, which included the 14-year-old Petula Clark, broadcast from the Golders Green Hippodrome. He repeated his appearance on Variety twice in January the following year, and in December 1948, billed as 'The one-man BBC', starred twice in his own show Melody and Mirth. On 26 July 1948 he appeared in a variety bill at the London Casino which was reviewed by The Billboard: "Jackie Hunter got off to a slow start but reached a high pitch with an imaginary poker game. He closed his act with a turn at the drums which was a noisy affair but dull in spots."

Jackie Hunter died on 21 November 1951 at Hendon in London, England.
