= John A. Hunter (judge) =

American judge (1833–1887)

John A. Hunter (November 15, 1833 – June 22, 1887) was chief justice of the Supreme Court of the Utah Territory from 1879 to 1884.

Born in Manchester, Ohio, Hunter entered the University of Virginia in 1857, but withdrew the following Spring. He practiced law with his father beginning in 1860, later establishing his own practice with friends in St. Louis, Missouri. During the American Civil War, he served in the 13th Ohio Infantry Regiment, achieving the rank of captain, until he mustered out in 1861.

On July 2, 1879, Hunter was appointed chief justice of the Supreme Court of the Utah Territory, remaining in that office for five years.

Hunter died in Salt Lake City after a lingering illness of two years.

Political offices
Preceded by Michael Schaeffer	Chief Justice of the Utah Territorial Supreme Court; 1879–1884	Succeeded by Charles S. Zane
