= John Hunter (colonial administrator) =

British Honduran governor

Sir John Adams Hunter, KCMG (30 Oct. 1890 – 17 November 1962) was a British colonial administrator. He was Lieutenant-Governor of Malta from 1938 to 1940 and Governor of British Honduras from 1940 to 1947.

Prior to his role in Malta and Honduras, he is said to have held as a role in British India, most prominently as a District Collector in the Princely State of Hyderabad in the 1920s. There are records of him ordering the construction of the clock tower in the District of Karimnagar around 1928, which still stands in city center today.

== See also ==
- List of colonial governors and administrators of British Honduras
