= The Gay Intruders =

1948 film by Ray McCarey

- Directed by: Ray McCarey
- Produced by: Ray McCarey; Francis Swann
- Starring: John Emery; Tamara Geva; Leif Erickson; Roy Roberts
- Cinematography: Mack Stengler
- Edited by: Bert Jordan
- Music by: Raoul Kraushaar
- Production company: Frank Seltzer Productions
- Distributed by: 20th Century Fox
- Release date: September 2, 1948
- Running time: 68 minutes
- Country: United States
- Language: English

The Gay Intruders is a 1948 American comedy film directed by Ray McCarey and released by 20th Century Fox.

== Plot ==
John and Maria are successful onstage but have marriage problems offstage. Their talent manager convinces them to consult married psychiatrists Dr. Matson and Dr. Nash separately. As John and Maria's relationship begins to sweeten, the doctors' relationship begins to sour.

== Cast ==
- Tamara Geva as Maria Ivar
- John Emery as John Newberry
- Leif Erickson as Dr. Harold Matson
- Virginia Gregg as Dr. Susan Nash
- Roy Roberts as Charles McNulty
- Si Wills as Arthur
- Harry Lauter as the male secretary
- Marilyn Williams as the female secretary
- Sara Berner as Ethel
