= The Frozen Limits =

1939 film

- Opening titles
- Directed by: Marcel Varnel
- Written by: Marriott Edgar; Val Guest; J. O. C. Orton
- Produced by: Edward Black
- Starring: The Crazy Gang; Moore Marriott; Bernard Lee
- Cinematography: Arthur Crabtree
- Edited by: R. E. Dearing
- Music by: Louis Levy; Charles Williams
- Production company: Gainsborough Pictures
- Distributed by: General Film Distributors
- Release date: November 1939
- Running time: 84 minutes
- Country: United Kingdom
- Language: English

The Frozen Limits is a 1939 British comedy western film directed by Marcel Varnel and starring Jimmy Nervo, Bud Flanagan, Teddy Knox, Chesney Allen and Charlie Naughton (The Crazy Gang). It was written by Marriott Edgar, Val Guest and J. O. C. Orton. Produced by Gainsborough Pictures it was shot at Islington Studios in London. The film's sets were designed by the art director Alex Vetchinsky.

== Plot ==
Fairground entertainers The Six Wonder Boys are doing poor business, and read in the newspaper which wrapped their fish and chips that there is a gold rush in Alaska. Off they go, without realising the paper was 40 years old. On arrival they are shown hospitality by Tom Tiddler, an elderly, absent-minded gold prospector. For fun, the boys fake a new gold rush, and chaos ensues.

== Cast ==
- Jimmy Nervo as Cecil
- Bud Flanagan as Bud
- Teddy Knox as Teddy
- Chesney Allen as "Ches"
- Charlie Naughton as Charlie
- Jimmy Gold as Jimmy
- Moore Marriott as Tom Tiddler
- Eileen Bell as Jill
- Anthony Hulme as "Tex" O'Brien
- Bernard Lee as Bill McGrew
- Eric Clavering as "Foxy"

== Reception ==
=== Box office ===
According to Kine Weekly it did well at the British box office in January 1940.

=== Critical ===
The Monthly Film Bulletin wrote: "The story ... does not matter in this film, in which the Crazy Gang are at their crazy best. Ably seconded by Moore Marriott as an old prospector, they go from one ridiculous situation to another with the utmost aplomb while jokes crackle like fireworks on a frosty night. The settings are intentionally ludicrous, the photography adequate, while the direction allows the gang to get suitably out of hand."

Kine Weekly wrote: "The responsibility of putting the laughable stunts over is more or less left to the Crazy Gang, and their exuberant buffoonery hallmarks the welcome humour."
