= Gasbags =

- Opening title
- Directed by: Walter Forde; Marcel Varnel
- Written by: Marriott Edgar; Val Guest
- Produced by: Edward Black
- Starring: The Crazy Gang; Moore Mariott; Carl Jaffe
- Cinematography: Arthur Crabtree
- Edited by: R. E. Dearing
- Music by: Louis Levy
- Production company: Gainsborough Pictures
- Distributed by: General Film Distributors
- Release date: 1 February 1941
- Running time: 77 minutes
- Country: United Kingdom
- Language: English

Gasbags is a 1941 British comedy film directed by Walter Forde and Marcel Varnel and starring The Crazy Gang and Moore Marriott. It was written by Marriott Edgar and Val Guest. The film was a morale-booster in the early part of the Second World War.

== Plot ==
The Crazy Gang's mobile fish and chip shop is tethered to a barrage balloon which lifts the shop into the air and the gang is carried to Nazi Germany. They are captured but break out of prison, impersonate Adolf Hitler and return to England in a stolen secret weapon.

== Cast ==
- Bud Flanagan as Bud
- Chesney Allen as "Ches"
- Jimmy Nervo as Cecil
- Teddy Knox as "Knoxy"
- Charlie Naughton as Charlie
- Jimmy Gold as "Goldy"
- Moore Marriott as Jerry Jenkins
- Wally Patch as Sergeant-Major
- Peter Gawthorne as Commanding Officer
- Frederick Valk as Sturmfuehrer
- Eric Clavering as Scharffuehrer
- Anthony Eustrel as Gestapo Officer
- Carl Jaffe as Gestapo Chief
- Manning Whiley as Colonel
- Torin Thatcher as SS Man
- George Merritt as German General
- Irene Handl as Burgomaster's Wife
- Leonard Sharp as Chip Shop Customer
- Mavis Villiers as Woman
- Henry Longhurst as Woodcutter
- Theodore Zichy as 2nd-in-Command

== Production ==
It was shot at the Lime Grove Studios in London. The film's sets were designed by the art director Alex Vetchinsky. It was the fourth and final film starring the comedians at Gainsborough Pictures. Flanagan and Allen subsequently moved to British National where they made a further four films over the next few years.

== Critical reception ==
The Monthly Film Bulletin wrote: "An amusing and effective production with so much nonsense by "the Kings of Nonsense" that perhaps "a crazy film" would more aptly describe Gasbags. Moore Marriott gives a beautifully crazy performance as old Jerry and the rest of the cast should be congratulated on keeping its countenance."

TV Guide called it "An exhilarating comedy."

The Radio Times called it "the best film ever made by the Crazy Gang ... Director Marcel Varnel has just the right surreal touch to make it work and leave audiences laughing."

In British Sound Films: The Studio Years 1928–1959 David Quinlan rated the film as "good", writing: "Crazy is the word."

== Soundtrack ==
Bud Flanagan and Chesney Allen, "Yesterday's Dreams" (written by Michael Carr and Dorothy Day)
