= Edward Black (producer) =

British film producer (1900–1948)

- Born: Edward Black; 18 August 1900; Birmingham, UK
- Died: 30 November 1948 (aged 48); London, UK
- Occupation: Film producer
- Years active: 1935 – 1948
- Notable work: The Lady Vanishes

Edward Black (18 August 1900, Birmingham – 30 November 1948, London) was a British film producer, best known for being head of production at Gainsborough Studios in the late 1930s and early 1940s, during which time he oversaw production of the Gainsborough melodramas. He also produced such classic films as The Lady Vanishes (1938).

Black has been called "one of the unsung heroes of the British film industry" and "one of the greatest figures in British film history, the maker of stars like Margaret Lockwood, James Mason, John Mills and Stewart Granger. He was also one of the very few producers whose films, over a considerable period, made money." In 1946 Mason called Black "the one good production executive" that J. Arthur Rank had.

Frank Launder called Black "a great showman and yet he had a great feeling for scripts and spent more time on them than anyone I have ever known. His experimental films used to come off as successful as his others." A 1947 profile called him "one of the most important of the Back Room Boys in British films" who "probably found more stars than anyone else in British films."

Black specialized in making comedies, thrillers and low-budget musicals. He had considerable success producing comedy vehicles for stars such as Will Hay and Arthur Askey. He also made early films from Carol Reed and Alfred Hitchcock and was an early supporter of writer directors Sidney Gilliat and Frank Launder.

According to Robert Murphy, "Black concentrated on making films for British audiences. Like his brother George at the London Palladium, Ted had an almost superstitious faith in his ability to divine popular taste and was wary about involving himself with anything that might dilute it."

Alfred Roome, a film editor at Gainsborough, said: "We often wondered why Ted Black didn't mix with the elite of his profession. I don't think he ever went to a premiere, star parties and the like. One day he explained his apparent aloofness. He said he didn't want to get contaminated by people outside his band of entertainment. 'If I mix with the intellectual lot, it'll impair my judgement', he said."

Black helped promote new stars like Margaret Lockwood, Michael Redgrave and Phyllis Calvert. He also employed variety performers like Will Hay, Will Fyffe and The Crazy Gang, and the comedian Arthur Askey.

Black was very strong in promoting writers. Frank Launder said: "Ted believed in writers. To him the screenplay was the be-all and end- all. He enjoyed script conferences and went in for them wholesale, which made it pretty arduous going for the script editor as well as the writers and directors."

== Early life ==
Black was the third son of George Black, a property master at the Theatre Royal, Birmingham, who became a cinema owner. George Black became a manager of a touring waxworks show then travelling cinema; in 1905 he set up the Monkwearmouth Picture Hall in Sounderland - this was one of the first permanent cinemas in Britain. He bought two more before he died in 1910. His sons Ted, George and Alfred built up the cinema to a circuit of thirteen cinemas in the Tyneside area. In 1919 they sold them and set about establishing another circuit. In 1928 they told this to the General Theatre Corporation. When that was taken over by Gaumont-British, Ted became a cinema circuit manager.

In 1930 he went into production. (Black's brother George later ran the London Palladium and Alfred stayed a cinema manager. Michael Balcon wrote " All the Black family have a flair for showmanship and Ted found in films a natural outlet for his talents.".)

== Gaumont British ==
In 1930 Black became an assistant production manager at Shepherd's Bush and then studio manager at Islington. At Islington, he became an associate producer working closely with Michael Balcon.

In 1935 Black and Sidney Gilliat were associate producers on Tudor Rose starring Nova Pilmbeam. Black's earliest films included Where There's a Will (1936) a comedy starring Will Hay and co-written by Sidney Gilliat and Leslie Arliss, men who would all be crucial to Black's career. Black also made The Man Who Lived Again (1936) starring Boris Karloff, visiting from Hollywood, co-written by Gilliat and directed by Robert Stevenson.

=== Head of Studio ===
Gaumont-British had studios at Shepherd's Bush and Islington and owned companies such as Gainsborough. In December 1936, Michael Balcon left Gaumont-British for MGM and Ted Black took over his job as head of the studio along with Maurice Ostrer (Ostrer was officially head of the studio but the jobs of the two men overlapped). Gaumont British was in financial crisis around this time and in 1937 Shepherd's Bush studios and Gaumont-British Distributors were closed. However, the company continued as a production center thanks to a deal with C.M. Woolf and J. Arthur Rank's General Film Distributors. Black's films helped restore the studio to a firm financial footing.

Historian Geoffrey MacNab wrote "Black, from a circus background, was determinedly unpretentious, with a showman's touch and the desire to make films about people outside London high society." According to historian Patrick McGilligan, "Rather than pining after Hollywood names, Black placed his bets on English personalities. Rather than cobbling together star vehicles, he promoted a solid script as the basis of a well-made film... Unlike Balcon, Black delighted in script conferences." Another film historian, John Russell Taylor, wrote " Black believed in the importance of the script - Gainsborough was the only British company that had a regular scenario department along Hollywood lines — the importance of the director... and above all, the importance of the star."

Black's next film with Hay, Good Morning, Boys! (1937) was a large hit, directed by Marcel Varnel, who made several films for Black. The script was co-written by Val Guest who also worked regularly for the producer. Guest later called Black "a very helpful producer...You had an enormous feeling of being backed up whatever you did. If any problem arose Ted would solve it. In all the producers that I have had in my gnarled career, only two producers have given me the feeling I am completely backed up no matter what happened, one was Ted Black and the other was Michael Carreras. You felt absolutely safe no matter what."

Black followed this with another comedy, O-Kay for Sound (1937), the first movie from The Crazy Gang, a comedy group that had worked with Black's brother George, the impresario at the London Palladium.

Black alo made Said O'Reilly to McNab (1937) with Will Mahoney and Will Fyffe (directed by American William Beaudine, and Oh, Mr. Porter! (1937) with Hay. The story of Oh, Mr Porter was written by Frank Launder. A 1937 article said Black "has done a singularly good job of work on British pictures... He is one of the few British producers who believe that a film is thought of, born, and finished in a typewriter and that the actual production on the floor is secondary."

Kinematograph Weekly later wrote Black "was responsible in the 1930's for the unbroken succession of comedy hits from Islington, in which Jack Hulbert, Will Hay, Gordon Harker and Moore Marriott made their screen names."

=== Margaret Lockwood and Other Stars ===
Black produced the drama Doctor Syn (1937) starring George Arliss. In 1940, Arliss wrote about Black:

He is so entirely unlike a movie boss: he doesn't seem to interfere with anyone. It is only by degrees you find out that he has everything under his hand and that he really directs the movements of every department. He is very like a mere businessman, one who believes that it is of no use to lay in a stock of goods that can never produce any return; and that the making of canned pictures should be controlled with the Kune care as the preparation of any other earned goods intended for public consumption. Unless I am much mistaken, Edward Black is going to show us how pictures made in England can be made to pay.

The female lead of Doctor Syn was Margaret Lockwood, who impressed Black so much he signed her to a three-year contract. Black then set about building Lockwood into a star, saying "she has something with which every girl in the suburbs can identify herself." Black was determined to create a star system at Gaumont and Lockwood was key to these plans. He put her in other films such as Owd Bob (1938) with Fyffe directed by Robert Stevenson; Bank Holiday (1938) directed by Carol Reed; Hitchcock's The Lady Vanishes (1938) [discussed below]; and A Girl Must Live (1939) with Reed. Later on he would use Lockwood in Night Train to Munich (1940) with Reed from a script by Launder and Gilliat, The Girl in the News (1941), Dear Octopus (1943), The Man in Grey (1943) and Give Us the Moon (1944).

Black was keen to increase his stable of comedy stars and signed deals with comics such as Tom Walls, the Crazy Grang. He produced Strange Boarders (1938) with Walls, Convict 99 (1938) with Hay, Alf's Button Afloat (1938) with the Crazy Gang, The Man with 100 Faces (1938) with Walls, Hey! Hey! U.S.A! (1938) with Hay, and Old Bones of the River (1938) with Hay.

A 1938 article called Black "the man who makes the British film stars. A modest man, not very ambitious, content to spend £40,000 on a film where others would pass with £100,000."

=== Alfred Hitchcock ===
Alfred Hitchcock had two films left on a contract with Gaumont when Black became head of the studio. The first film Black made with Hitchcock was Young and Innocent (1937) starring Nova Pilbeam. According to Hitchcock's biographer, Patrick McGillian, "Black was an unabashed Hitchcock fan. He and his brother were both longtime acquaintances of the director; now Black made it his business to be helpful, clearing all obstacles from Hitchcock's path and stretching the budget wherever possible. He took over as Hitchcock's buffer with the Ostrers. The two films Hitchcock made with Black as his producer are among his most enjoyable."

The film was not hugely popular and Sidney Gilliat said that the Ostrers wanted to did not want to proceed with a second Hitchcock movie in order to save the studio money. However, Black pushed for a second film, The Lady Vanishes (1938). Black had bought the rights to the original novel, "The Wheel Spins", and developed the screenplay with Launder and Gilliatt as a project for director Roy William Neill. This project was delayed, so Black gave the project to Hitchcock. The producer also assigned two actors he had under contract to play the leads, Michael Redgrave and Margaret Lockwood. The film became a classic. It also launched the comedy team of Basil Radford and Nauhton Wayne who went on to star in several more movies as a duo.

=== 20th Century Fox and MGM Deal ===
In August 1938 Gaumont signed a deal with MGM for that studio to distribute films in the US, starting with The Lady Vanishes.

In late 1938, Gaumont signed a deal with 20th Century Fox to make 14 films at $5 million under the supervision of Ostrer and Black. Films would be made by Gaumont but distributed by Fox. Under the terms of this deal, some Gaumont stars would appear in films in Hollywood. The movies would be Where's the Fire? with Will Fyffe, Shipyard Sally with Gracie Fields; Sam and Sally with Fields and Fyffe; Rob Roy with Michael Redgrave, Margaret Lockwood and Fyffe; Gold Rush, London After Dark with Sydney Howard; Monday Night At Seven; Charley's Aunt starring Arthur Askey; The Blue Lagoon with Lockwood and Fyffe; Hangman's House with George Sanders; two Annabella pictures, including Sunshine Susie; The Girl in the News with Redgrave and Lockwood; and They Came By Night with Nova Pilbeam and Fyffe. Not all these films would be made (several were cancelled during the war) or were made later with different casts. Will Fyffe and Margaret Lockwood did make some films at Fox in Hollywood such as Rulers of the Sea and Susannah of the Mounties.

Black produced Where's the Fire, then Inspector Hornleigh on Holiday (1939) written by Launder and Gilliat, The Frozen Limits (1939) with the Crazy Gang, and They Came by Night (1940) with Fyffe and Phyllis Calvert, written by Launder and Gilliatt.

=== World War Two ===
James Mason later recalled that when World War Two broke out, Black "called everyone on to the set at Islington and told them that there was to be no more production at the studio because, in the event of an air-raid, the huge power chimney was likely to collapse and crush everybody." The studio was half way through filming Band Waggon with Arthur Askey. This was halted and the following week filming resumed at Lime Grove. Other comedies included Charley's (Big-Hearted) Aunt (1940) with Askey, Gasbags (1941) with the Crazy Gang, The Ghost Train (1941) with Askey, Hi Gang! (1941) with Ben Lyon and Bebe Daniels (based on their radio show), I Thank You (1941) with Askey and Back-Room Boy (1942) with Askey. Charley's Aunt was a key film in the career of Phyllis Calvert, who would be another Black discovery.

Black did not neglect dramas either such as For Freedom (1940) with Fyffe, The Girl in the News and Night Train to Munich with Lockwood, Neutral Port (1940) with Fyffee, and Once a Crook (1941) with Gordon Harker.

A prestigue production was The Remarkable Mr. Kipps (1941) directed by Carol Reed from script by Launder and Gilliat starring Michael Redgrave and Phyllis Calvert. War films included Inspector Hornleigh Goes to It (1941), Cottage to Let (1941) from director Anthony Asquith, and Uncensored (1942) from Asquith with Phyllis Calvert.

Another prestige film was The Young Mr. Pitt (1942) directed by Carol Reed from a Launder Gilliat script. It was one of the most popular movies at the British box office that year. Black would alternate these with comedies such as King Arthur Was a Gentleman (1942) with Askey, It's That Man Again (1943) with Tommy Handley (based on his radio show), and Miss London Ltd. (1943) with Askey. Miss London Ltd was the directorial debut of Val Guest.

In May 1941 Black formed his own company, Edward Black Productions.

Black also produced war films such as We Dive at Dawn (1943) from Anthony Asquith. This film helped make a star of John Mills, who Black put under option after seeing him stage.

In the words of one writer, Black "held the studio together during its most difficult period, backed Laundner and Gilliat in establishing a strong script department, retained the services of some of the best cameramen in the business, and put under contract a number of promising actors."

=== Gainsborough melodramas ===
Black produced the first Gainsborough melodrama, The Man in Grey (1943) directed by Leslie Arliss. The movie was a huge commercial success, making stars out of its four leads, Margaret Lockwood, James Mason, Stewart Granger and Phyllis Calvert. Black had worked with Lockwood and Clavert several times; he cast Mason after Eric Portman was unavailable, and selected Granger on the recommendation of Robert Donat. Calvert later claimed Arliss was "not at all" responsible for the eventual success of the film, attributing that more to Ted Black as "the one who would watch it, cut it, and know exactly what the audience would take. I don't say he wanted to do really good films, but he knew where the money was and he made all those escapist films during the war."

Black followed it up with Fanny By Gaslight (1944), with Calvert, Mason, Granger and Jean Kent, directed by Anthony Asquith. This was another huge commercial success and helped launch Kent as a star. Mason later recalled "I acted with uncalled-for hostility towards all the top brass of Gainsborough... Sparing only Ted Black, whose record I respected."

Black alternated the melodramas with light comedies like Dear Octopus (1943) with Lockwood and Michael Wilding and comedy vehicles like Askey's Bees in Paradise (1944), directed by Guest, and Tommy Handley's Time Flies (1944).

In May 1943 Black was appointed a director of Gainsborough Pictures Ltd.

Black produced the war movie Millions Like Us (1943) which was the directorial debut of Gilliat and Launder. Gilliat says "the Ostrers thought the whole project ludicrous" but it was successful and not only launched Gilliat and Launder as directors but made a star of Pat Roc.

Black produced Give Us the Moon (1944), a light comedy with Margaret Lockwood directed by Guest, which was not a commercial success. However, more films from Launder and Gilliat were: Two Thousand Women (1944) with Calvert and Pat Roc, and Waterloo Road (1944) with John Mills and Stewart Granger. Waterloo Road would be Black's final film at Gainsborough.

=== Leaving Gainsborough ===
Black's relationship with Maurice Ostrer was not always easy. Historian Arthur Wood later wrote about:

His unhappy relations... with the Ostrer Brothers, partly due to his own downrightness: he had the independence bred of independent means. He used to call Maurice Ostrer “The Brains Trust”; and would remark cheerfully, whenever Maurice was missing from the office, “You'll probably find him on the flat at Newmarket”. His admirers under-estimated the great personal contribution made by the Ostrers to Gainsborough's successes; and it was understandable that the Ostrers, in return, hardly gave him the credit which was his due. And perhaps there is another reason why Ted Black received little publicity and praise. He cared nothing for such things he only cared for making films.

Black also clashed with the Rank Organisation when they took over Gainsborough. In November 1943, just as Waterloo Road had begun filming, Black resigned to join Alexander Korda at MGM-London Films. (Maurice Ostrer would leave Gainsborough in 1946). His contract was worth a reported £15,000 a year.

The Ostrers would leave Rank in 1946, According to Alan Wood, the Ostrer brothers "piqued by common talk in the trade that the Gainsborough successes were mainly due to Ted Black, were determined to show what they could do on their own." They formed their own company and made Idol of Paris directed by Arliss which was a big flop which Wood said "badly revealed the absence of Ted Black's restraining common sense, and did less than justice to the Ostrers’ undoubted talent." Wood also said Black's successor "Sydney Box at Gainsborough never equalled Ted Black."

== Last films and death ==
A 1946 article claimed Black "has done more behind the scenes to put British stars and films on the map than any other personality." Black explained his theory of stardom in this article:

It is screen personality that counts. An indefinable something that comes over from the artist to audience and registers, that makes a star. The public are quick to spot this in their favourites and acclaim them after seeing them in a series of popular pictures. This continuity of appearance is important... Stars are usually the world's worst judges of the roles they should play because they are the last people to understand themselves.

In 1946 it was reported Black was preparing a version of The Pickwick Papers which appears not to have been made. He also was reported as helping prepare a film called In Queen's Service.

Other unmade projects originally announced for Black include a version of John Buchan's novel Greenmantle with Ralph Richardson, Arnold Bennett's Old Wives' Tale and an "underworld" story written by journalist Percy Hopkins directed by Brian Desmond Hurst.

Black was one of several producers under contract to British Lion, others including Leslie Arliss, Korda, Anthony Kimmins and Herbert Wilcox. Black made two films for Korda. The first, A Man About the House (1947), was directed by Leslie Arliss and introduced a new name Kieron Moore but was not particularly popular and lost money for Korda.

It was followed by an expensive epic Bonnie Prince Charlie (1948), which was a commercial catastrophe. Critic Campbell Dixon later wrote " I tried more than once to talk Ted Black out of Bonnie Prince Charlie, partly because Charles Edward, though doubtless an agreeable playboy and accomplished charmer, never did anything except drag a lot of brave men to death, and partly because the story inevitably ends in anti-climax—it's the wrong shape."

However the extent of Black's contribution to the film is uncertain as it involved several directors and in November 1947 it was reported he walked off the film.

Black died of lung cancer on 30 November 1948 at the age of 48, shortly after the premiere of Bonnnie Prince Charlie. When he died he was planning to make a film about the police force, To Watch and to Ward. According to Alan Wood "he worked and smoked himself to death".

In 1949 Frank Launder suggested the British film industry follow the policy of Ted Black "basing our programme upon a diversity of product, a properly planned economy, a start building system and a careful selection and preparation of story material, we might be able to produce a very consistent stream of product, which the public would welcome."

== Personal life ==
Black was survived by his wife, Frances, and two daughters, Pamela and Sheila. Sheila married war hero William Hall in 1950.

== Partial filmography ==
=== Leslie Arliss (director) ===
- The Man in Grey (1943)
- A Man About the House (1947)

=== Arthur Askey (star) ===
- Band Waggon (1940)
- Charley's (Big-Hearted) Aunt (1940)
- The Ghost Train (1941)
- I Thank You (1941)
- Back-Room Boy (1942)
- King Arthur Was a Gentleman (1942)
- Miss London Ltd. (1943)
- Bees in Paradise (1944)

=== Anthony Asquith (director) ===
- Uncensored (1942)
- We Dive at Dawn (1943)
- Fanny by Gaslight (1944)

=== The Crazy Gang (stars) ===
- O-Kay for Sound (1937)
- Alf's Button Afloat (1938) with Flanagan and Allan
- The Frozen Limits (1939)
- Gasbags (1941)

=== Will Fyffe (star) ===
- Said O'Reilly to McNab (1937) with Will Mahoney
- Owed Bob (1938) aka To the Victor with Margaret Lockwood
- They Came by Night (1940)
- For Freedom (1940)
- Neutral Port (1940)

=== Tommy Handley (star) ===
- It's That Man Again (1943)
- Time Flies (1944)

=== Gordon Harker/Alastair Sim (stars) ===
- Inspector Hornleigh (1938)
- Inspector Hornleigh on Holiday (1939)
- Inspector Hornleigh Goes To It (US: Mail Train, 1941)
- Cottage to Let (without Harker, 1941)
- Once a Crook (1941)

=== Will Hay (star) ===
- Boys Will Be Boys (1935)
- Where There's a Will (1936)
- Good Morning, Boys (1937)
- Oh, Mr Porter! (1937)
- Convict 99 (1938)
- Old Bones of the River (1938)
- Hey! Hey! USA (1938)
- Ask a Policeman (1939)
- Where's That Fire? (1940)

=== Alfred Hitchcock (director) ===
- Young and Innocent (1937)
- The Lady Vanishes (1938) with Lockwood

=== Alexander Korda (co-producer) ===
- Bonnie Prince Charlie (1948)

=== Launder and Gilliat (director/producers) ===
- Partners in Crime (1942)
- Millions Like Us (1943)
- 2,000 Women (1944)
- Waterloo Road (1944)

=== Carol Reed (director) ===
- Bank Holiday (1938) with Margaret Lockwood
- A Girl Must Live (1939) with Lockwood
- Night Train to Munich (1940) with Margaret Lockwod and Rex Harrison
- The Girl in the News (1941) with Margaret Lockwood
- Kipps (1941)
- A Letter from Home (1941)
- The Young Mr. Pitt (1942)

=== Robert Stevenson (director) ===
- Tudor Rose (1936)
- The Man Who Changed His Mind (1936)

=== Tom Walls (star) ===
- Strange Boarders (1938)
- Crackerjack (1938) aka Man with 1000 Faces

=== Shorts ===
- Rush Hour (1941)
- Mr. Proudfoot Shows a Light (1941)

=== Other ===
- Everybody Dance (1936)
- Doctor Syn (1937) with George Arliss and Margaret Lockwood
- Hi Gang! (1941)
- Dear Octopus (1944)
- Give Us the Moon (1944)

== Notes ==
- Murphy, Robert (1997). "Gainsborough's producers". In Pam Cook (ed.). Gainsborough Pictures. Cassell.
