= Max Bacon (actor) =

English comedian, actor and musician (1904–1969)

Max Bacon

Max David Bacon (1 March 1904, London, England – 3 December 1969, London, England) was a British actor, comedian and musician (drummer and occasional vocalist in Ambrose's band). Although he was British-born, his comedic style centred on his pseudo-European, Yiddish accent and in his straight-faced mispronunciation of words.

== Biography ==
Bacon's father came from a leather-working family to London from Katowice, then in Galicia in the Austro-Hungarian Empire. In London, his father worked as a basket-weaver.

Before becoming a character actor, Bacon was a drummer in Britain during the 1920s and 1930s. He was taught by the vocalist and drummer Harry Bentley. After a couple of years at the Florida Club with Ronnie Munro's band he began a long association with Ambrose's Orchestra, with whom he recorded as drummer and occasionally as Yiddish vocalist. In the late 1930s he had become well known enough to tour the halls in his own right and as part of a touring unit known as the Ambrose Octet with Evelyn Dall, among others.

He lived in his later years at The White House, a hotel near Great Portland Street, London, now known as the Melia White House, in Albany Street. He never married.

== Partial filmography ==
- Soft Lights and Sweet Music (1936) - Himself
- Calling All Stars (1937) - Himself
- Kicking the Moon Around (1938) - Gus
- King Arthur Was a Gentleman (1942) - Maxie
- Miss London Ltd. (1943) - Romero
- Bees in Paradise (1944) - Max Adler
- Give Us the Moon (1944) - Jacobus
- Cuckoo College (1949, TV Movie) - English Master
- The Gambler and the Lady (1952) - Maxie
- Take a Powder (1953) - Maxie
- The Diary of Anne Frank (London theatre production 1955)
- Together Again (1957, TV Series)
- Musical Playhouse (1959, TV Series) - Bookmaker
- William Tell (1959, TV Series) - Cobbler
- The Crowning Touch (1959) - Bemberger
- No Hiding Place (1959, TV Series) - Charlie Locke
- Educating Archie (1959, TV Series)
- The Entertainer (1960) - Charlie Klein
- The Rag Trade (1961, TV Series) - Mr. Conway
- Play It Cool (1962) - Lotus Proprietor
- Ghost Squad (1963, TV Series) - Sam
- Love Story (1963, TV Series) - Mr Rosen
- Z-Cars (1964, TV Series) - Nagle
- The Eyes of Annie Jones (1964) - Publican Hoskins
- Crooks in Cloisters (1964) - Bookmaker
- Gideon's Way (1964, TV Series) - Bookie Thompson
- Theatre 625 (1965-1966, TV Series) - Green / Herbert Fink
- The Sandwich Man (1966) - Chef
- Privilege (1967) - Julie Jordan
- The Whisperers (1967) - Mr. Fish
- The Wednesday Play (1967, TV Series) - Coldshead
- Chitty Chitty Bang Bang (1968) - Orchestra Leader
- The Nine Ages of Nakedness (1969) - Yossel (segment "The Egyptians")
- Detective (1969, TV Series) - Aaronson
- Along the Way (1972) - (final film role)
