= 'Monsewer' Eddie Gray =

English stage comedian (1898–1969)

In stage make-up as "Monsewer" Eddie

Edward Earl Gray (10 June 1898 – 15 September 1969), who performed as 'Monsewer' Eddie Gray, was an English stage comedian. He appeared in music halls as a solo act and also as a member of the Crazy Gang.

Gray was apprenticed to a juggler at the age of nine and became a technically proficient straight juggler. He gradually introduced a wry humour into his act, and was invited to appear with the comic double act Nervo and Knox in 1919. The three performers formed the original basis of the group of seven comedians who became famous under the collective name the Crazy Gang in the 1930s.

When the Crazy Gang re-formed after the Second World War, Gray did not rejoin them. He pursued a solo career until 1956 when he once more became a regular member of the group for their last three shows, ending in 1962. After the disbanding of the Crazy Gang, Gray continued to work. Among his later appearances was that in the London production of A Funny Thing Happened on the Way to the Forum in 1962.

== Life and career ==
=== Juggler ===
Gray was born in Pimlico, London, one of nine children of Edward Earl Gray, a shopkeeper, and his wife, Rebecca, née Daniels. Gray and his brother Danny were apprenticed to a juggling troupe when Gray was nine years old. His son, yet another Edward, was for many years the manager of the Coburg Hotel in Bayswater. As a juggler he toured Europe, the US, and Asia. At first he performed as a straight, and highly skilled, juggler, but he gradually introduced into his act the deadpan humour for which he became known.

As a friend of the comedian Jimmy Nervo since they were both child performers, Gray was invited to appear with Nervo and his stage partner Teddy Knox in 1919. He made further appearances with them in the 1920s, his laconic stage persona contrasting with their frantic anarchy.

During the 1920s Gray toured widely. He was a member of Harry Lauder's company touring Australia and South Africa. The Sydney Morning Herald praised his "amusing dexterity in the handling of clubs and hoops". In 1931 he married Marie Cecilia Loftus (d. 1994), a variety performer known professionally as Patti Loftus, one of the "Loftus Sisters".

=== The Crazy Gang ===
In November 1931 Gray appeared with Nervo and Knox and Naughton and Gold in a show called Crazy Week at the London Palladium. The historian David Goldie describes them as giving "an impression of spontaneous mayhem throughout the theatre, with performances spilling into the auditorium and constant 'interruption gags' in which the performers would intrude into other acts on the bill." The show was a success, and further Crazy Weeks and Crazy Months followed. Flanagan and Allen joined the team in 1932, and the following year all seven members of the group appeared in the Royal Variety Performance in a bill that included Burns and Allen, Wilson, Keppel and Betty, Evelyn Laye and Billy Bennett.

From 1937 the company was billed as the Crazy Gang. Their Palladium shows in the 1930s were All Alight at Oxford Circus (1936), O-Kay for Sound (1936), London Rhapsody (1937), These Foolish Things (1938), and The Little Dog Laughed (1939).

During this period Gray perfected his trademark "Cockney-French". The humorist Paul Jennings, who called him "the funniest man in the world", gave an instance of it: "Je got 'ere un packet de cards, cinquante deux in numero. I cuttee in deux, with vang-seess ici and vang-seess there-si". His stage costume included a pair of metal-rimmed glasses and a looped moustache below a large nose that grew increasingly red over the years.

All the acts in the Crazy Gang maintained their separate careers between their joint shows at the Palladium. Gray appeared in variety shows with performers including Elsie and Doris Waters, and in pantomime with such stars as Florrie Forde. Of his performance in Puss in Boots in 1936, The Manchester Guardian said, "Monsewer Eddie Gray, quite arbitrary and quite irresistible ... The Monsewer's nose blazes more than ever, and his linguistic virtuosity now includes two words of German."

During the Second World War the Crazy Gang went their separate ways. They re-formed in 1947, but without Chesney Allen, who had retired from regular performing because of poor health, and without Gray, who continued his solo career. He appeared in variety alongside such performers as Douglas Byng, Arthur Askey, and Jimmy Edwards. He briefly rejoined the Crazy Gang for the 1948 Royal Variety Performance in which they co-starred with Gracie Fields and Laurel and Hardy.

Gray returned to the Crazy Gang as a regular member in 1956. He was in the group's last three shows, These Foolish Kings (1956), Clown Jewels (1959) and Young in Heart, which, in Goldie's words, "ran for 826 twice-nightly performances from December 1960 until an emotional farewell on 19 May 1962".

=== Later years ===
In 1963 Gray played Senex in the first London production of Stephen Sondheim's A Funny Thing Happened on the Way to the Forum. Reviewing the show in The Observer, Bamber Gascoigne wrote that the piece had roles for five comics: Frankie Howerd, Kenneth Connor, Jon Pertwee, Robertson Hare and Gray. "All are good, but the highest laurels must go to Eddie Gray and Frankie Howerd for a wonderful quality of detachment. They both make a comic routine 10 times funnier by plodding through it as though it occupies only one-fifth of their attention."

Gray never retired. He made his last stage appearance in September 1969, in an impromptu guest appearance in Elsie and Doris Waters' show at the Royal Hippodrome Theatre. He died three days later, on 15 September 1969, at Shoreham-by-Sea, Sussex, at the age of 71.

== Partial filmography ==
- First a Girl (1935) - Goose Trainer
- Skylarks (1936) - Monsewer Eddie Gray
- Keep Smiling (1938) - Silvo
- Don Chicago (1945) - Police Constable Gray
- Life Is a Circus (1960) - Eddie
- The Fast Lady (1962) - 2nd Golfer
