= Life Is a Circus =

1960 British film by Val Guest

- Directed by: Val Guest
- Written by: Val Guest; Len Heath; John Warren
- Produced by: John Pellatt; E.M. Smedley-Aston
- Starring: Bud Flanagan; Teddy Knox; Jimmy Nervo; Jimmy Gold
- Cinematography: Arthur Graham
- Edited by: James B. Clark; Bill Lenny
- Music by: Philip Green
- Production company: Vale Film Productions
- Distributed by: British Lion Films
- Release date: 16 February 1960
- Running time: 84 minutes
- Country: United Kingdom
- Language: English

Life is a Circus is a 1960 British comedy film directed by Val Guest and starring Bud Flanagan, Teddy Knox, Jimmy Nervo, Jimmy Gold and Charlie Naughton of the Crazy Gang. The screenplay concerns a down-on-its-luck circus that uses an Aladdin's Magic Lamp to try to save their business.

The film is generally considered inferior to the Crazy Gang's previous screen appearances.

== Cast ==
- Bud Flanagan as Bud
- Teddy Knox as Sebastian
- Jimmy Nervo as Cecil
- Jimmy Gold as "Goldie"
- Charlie Naughton as Charlie
- Eddie Gray as Eddie
- Chesney Allen as "Ches"
- Shirley Eaton as Shirley Winter
- Michael Holliday as Carl Rickenbeck
- Lionel Jeffries as "Genie"
- Joseph Tomelty as Joe Winter
- Eric Pohlmann as Rickenbeck
- Harold Kasket as Hassan
- Edwin Richfield as Driver
- Peter Glaze as Hand #1
- Sam Kydd as Removal Man
- Geoffrey Denton as Policeman

== Production ==
Val Guest said British Lion and E.M. Smedley-Aston "called me up and said “We want to make another picture with The Crazy Gang, are you interested?” and I said “Yes.” Because he said that they’d mentioned me or something…so the whole idea was to write a picture for the Crazy Gang. There we were writing for the Crazy Gang again, and all the boys got together again; we made this circus film for which we put up a big tent in Windsor, near the castle and shot it. They were all exactly the same, they hadn’t changed." Guest felt the film "worked, but I think the humour became dated... however much you tried to update it a bit was difficult. It wasn’t a success. I mean I don’t think it lost money, but it certainly didn’t make anything."

Shirley Eaton, who was in the cast, had appeared in some Carry On films.

== Reception ==
The Monthly Film Bulletin wrote: "Script and settings here simply provide a flimsy framework for knockabout antics in which the Crazy Gang disarm criticism by their innocent and undisciplined enthusiasm. As writer-director, Val Guest seems to take control only for an elaborate and hilarious trapeze sequence and the rather tedious romantic interludes with the self-consciously charming Michael Holliday. The woodenness of the small team of extras, and the almost total absence of children, make the circus and funfair scenes strikingly unplausible."
