= Alf's Button Afloat =

1938 British film by Marcel Varnel

- Original British trade ad
- Directed by: Marcel Varnel
- Written by: Marriott Edgar; Val Guest; Ralph Smart
- Based on: W.A. Darlington's "famous farce" Alf's Button
- Produced by: Edward Black
- Starring: Bud Flanagan; Chesney Allen; Jimmy Nervo; Teddy Knox; Charlie Naughton; Jimmy Gold; Alastair Sim
- Cinematography: Arthur Crabtree
- Edited by: R. E. Dearing; Alfred Roome
- Music by: Charles Williams
- Production company: Gainsborough Pictures
- Distributed by: General Film Distributors; Gaumont British Picture Corporation (presented by)
- Release date: July 1938 (UK)
- Running time: 89 minutes
- Country: United Kingdom
- Language: English

Alf's Button Afloat is a 1938 British comedy film directed by Marcel Varnel and starring Bud Flanagan, Chesney Allen, Jimmy Nervo, Teddy Knox, Charlie Naughton, Jimmy Gold and Alastair Sim. It was written by Marriott Edgar, Val Guest and Ralph Smart based on the 1920 novel Alf's Button by W.A. Darlington.

== Plot ==
The Crazy Gang go to sea, where one of them discovers a button on his uniform is made from the metal of Aladdin's lamp.

== Cast ==
- Bud Flanagan as Alf Higgins
- Chesney Allen as "Ches"
- Jimmy Nervo as Cecil
- Teddy Knox as Teddy
- Charlie Naughton as Charlie
- Jimmy Gold as Jimmy
- Alastair Sim as Eustace
- Wally Patch as Sergeant Hawkins
- Peter Gawthorne as Captain Driscol
- Agnes Lauchlan as Lady Driscol
- Glennis Lorimer as Frankie Driscol
- James Carney as Lieutenant John Hardy
- Wilson Coleman as Surgeon
- J.H. Roberts as Aladdin
- Bruce Winston as Mustapha
- Richard Cooper as Lord Wimbledon

== Reception ==
=== Box office ===
Kine Weekly reported the film did well at the British box office in October 1938.

=== Critical ===
The Monthly Film Bulletin wrote: "The Gang enters into the spirit of the thing with immense gusto. Helped by clever patter and amusing (and only occasionally vulgar) wisecracks they put over a hilarious, and riotously funny performance. There are very few dull patches, though, for a film of this type, it is on the long side. ...The appeal will be to the many who enjoy the Music Hall type of entertainment, and they will pass an hour and a half in almost continuous laughter."

The Daily Film Renter wrote: "Uproarious comedy, with the 'Crazy Gang' as street buskers coming into possession of magic button, and doing the stuff which has made them England's topline comedy team. ... Combined comics work wonders with rip-roaring material, staged 'regardless.'"

Kine Weekly wrote: "This wild, spectacular comedy extravaganza is the Crazy Gang at its brightest and best. The fantastic story is ideal material for their exuberant pantomime and buffoonery, and they set about it with a will that wins endless laughs. If the show doesn't panic the masses, nothing will. It is the liveliest and fruitiest piece of slapstick to be manufactured this side of the Atlantic. Production qualities and camera work are outstanding. Excellent comedy booking, a box-office certainty for the crowd."

Picturegoer wrote: "The plot is well worked out and the comedy situations are excellently timed. Marcel Varnel, the director, deserves full praise for producing a slapstick comedy that leaves its American counterparts standing. The slight romantic element is well supplied by James Carney as a Naval officer and Glennis Lorimer as the Captain's daughter."

Picture Show wrote: "The Crazy Gang of the London Palladium have never been more crazily funny than they are in this film. ...Alastair Sim is a joy as the genii who does not always interpret their demands as they mean them, and who comes out with all kinds of Americanisms after developing a taste for gangster films. You must not miss this if you want a good laugh."
