= King Arthur Was a Gentleman =

- Theatrical release poster
- Directed by: Marcel Varnel
- Written by: Marriott Edgar (writer); Val Guest (writer)
- Produced by: Edward Black (producer)
- Starring: Arthur Askey; Evelyn Dall; Anne Shelton; Max Bacon; Jack Train; Peter Graves
- Cinematography: Arthur Crabtree
- Edited by: R. E. Dearing
- Music by: Bob Busby
- Production company: Gainsborough Pictures
- Distributed by: General Film Distributors
- Release date: 28 December 1942
- Running time: 99 minutes
- Country: United Kingdom
- Language: English

King Arthur Was a Gentleman is a 1942 British black-and-white comedy musical film directed by Marcel Varnel and starring Arthur Askey, Evelyn Dall, Anne Shelton, Max Bacon, Jack Train and Peter Graves. It was written by Marriott Edgar and Val Guest, and was produced by Edward Black and Maurice Ostrer for Gainsborough Pictures.

== Plot ==
In the Second World War, the undersized Arthur joins the army to prove himself to his girlfriend Susan, who is in the same unit as him. Here, his idealistic notions about King Arthur prompt his messmates to trick him into believing that a sword they have dug up is the fabled Excalibur. Armed with this talisman, Arthur strides forth to deal with the Wehrmacht.

== Cast ==
- Arthur Askey as Arthur King
- Max Bacon as Maxie
- Al Burnett as "Slim"
- Evelyn Dall as Susan Ashley
- Vera Frances as Vera
- Peter Graves as Lance
- Brefni O'Rorke as Colonel Duncannon
- Anne Shelton as Gwen Duncannon
- Ronald Shiner as Sergeant
- Jack Train as Jack
- Victor Feldman as young drummer with Maxie
- Freddie Crump as himself, drumming

== Soundtrack ==
- Arthur Askey – "You Know What King Arthur Said"
- Arthur Askey – "Honey On My Mind"
- Anne Shelton – "Why Can't It Happen To Me?"
- Evelyn Dall – "You'll Love The Army"
- Evelyn Dall – "Got A Bee In My Bonnet"
- Evelyn Dall – "Actions Speak Louder Than Words"

== Reception ==
The Monthly Film Bulletin wrote: "Arthur Askey's admirers will appreciate King Arthur was a Gentleman to the full, for, apart from a few impersonations by Jack Train, and some outbursts of amusing backchat from Max Bacon, he carries the comic side of the film single-handed for the whole of its 99 minutes. That part of the film which describes Arthur's trials in camp is undoubtedly the funniest, since with the change of scene 'out East' the plot wanders and the end comes somewhat as an anti-climax. Evelyn Dall as Arthur's girlfriend is notable chiefly for her crooning ability, and both she and Anne Shelton take advantage of the opportunities which Manning Sherwin's excellent musical score gives them."

In British Sound Films: The Studio Years 1928–1959 David Quinlan rated the film as "average", writing: "Some funnyy scens and good songs, but overlong and missing opportunities to indulge in fantasy."

Leslie Halliwell said: "Not-too-successful attempt to turn a music hall comedian into a figure of Chaplinesque pathos."

The Radio Times Guide to Films gave the film 2/5 stars, writing: "This is as likeable as any flag-waving comedy, with Arthur Askey as the cheery Tommy who is convinced he has found King Arthur's sword Excalibur and is invincible. This could have done with fewer songs and more gags."
