= Hi Gang! (film) =

1941 British film by Marcel Varnel

- Theatrical release poster
- Directed by: Marcel Varnel
- Written by: Bebe Daniels (radio series); Ben Lyon (radio series); Marriott Edgar; Val Guest; J. O. C. Orton; Howard Irving Young
- Produced by: Edward Black
- Starring: Bebe Daniels; Ben Lyon; Vic Oliver; Moore Marriott
- Cinematography: Jack E. Cox
- Edited by: R. E. Dearing
- Music by: Louis Levy
- Production company: Gainsborough Pictures
- Distributed by: General Film Distributors
- Release date: 27 December 1941
- Running time: 100 minutes
- Country: United Kingdom
- Language: English

Hi Gang! is a 1941 British comedy film directed by Marcel Varnel and starring Bebe Daniels, Ben Lyon and Vic Oliver. It was written by Marriott Edgar, Val Guest, J. O. C. Orton and Howard Irving Young, based on the popular BBC radio series Hi Gang! written by Daniels, Lyon and Dick Pepper.

== Plot ==
Two married reporters in New York City working for rival radio networks engage in cut-throat competition, assisted by an incompetent with big ideas. A publicity stunt by the couple to adopt a British evacuee boy live on air goes wrong and they end up adopting Albert, a rowdy pub landlord's son and his cantankerous Uncle Jerry. They all travel to England in the mistaken belief that Albert is the son of Lord Amersham.

== Cast ==
- Bebe Daniels as The Liberty Girl
- Ben Lyon as The Liberty Girl's other half
- Vic Oliver as The Nuisance with the Ideas
- Moore Marriott as Uncle Jerry
- Graham Moffatt as Albert Tomlin
- Felix Aylmer as Lord Amersham
- Percy Parsons as Hergensheimer
- Diana Beaumont as Hergensheimer's secretary
- Jacques Brown as Botticelli
- Mavis Villiers as Botticelli's secretary
- Maurice Rhodes as Ben "Little Ben"
- Richard George as policeman
- Georgina Mackinnon as Mrs. Endicott
- MacDonald Parke as attorney
- Esmé Percy as Lord Chamberlain
- Ben Williams as Elmer

== Production ==
The film was made by Gainsborough Pictures at Lime Grove Studios, London. The film's art direction was by Walter W. Murton.

== PlotCritical reception ==
The Monthly Film Bulletin wrote: "Those who like the radio feature Hi Gang will enjoy this film version, though it is not until near the end that the actual broadcast programme is introduced. The story is, of course, farcical and the dialogue is full of wisecracks – some old, some new. All members of the cast play their allotted parts with zest and under competent direction the fun is kept going."

Kine Weekly wrote: "Generously mounted comedy extravaganza with song, built around the B.B.C.'s record-breaking series of weekly variety broadcasts of the same name. ... The irresponsible yet topical tale does not take the nearest route to its inevitable big Forces show ending, but the talented and popular stars nevertheless display sufficient resource to offset occasional flat-spots. With all its stupendous footage, the film is, in the main, an enjoyable rag."

In British Sound Films: The Studio Years 1928–1959 David Quinlan rated the film as "good", writing: "Brightish lark."

Leslie Halliwell said: "Icky farce based faintly on a wartime radio variety series, notable only for preserving the three stars involved."
