= Wild Boy (film) =

- Opening titles
- Directed by: Albert de Courville
- Written by: J.E.S. Bradford; Albert de Courville; Stafford Dickens
- Produced by: Michael Balcon
- Starring: Sonnie Hale; Bud Flanagan; Chesney Allen
- Cinematography: Philip Tannura
- Edited by: R. E. Dearing
- Music by: Louis Levy
- Production company: Gainsborough Pictures
- Distributed by: Gaumont British Distributors
- Release date: May 1934
- Running time: 85 minutes
- Country: United Kingdom
- Language: English

Wild Boy is a 1934 British comedy sports film directed by Albert de Courville and starring Sonnie Hale, Bud Flanagan and Chesney Allen. It was written by J.E.S. Bradford, de Courville and Stafford Dickens.

== Premise ==
This film is a caper story set in the world of greyhound racing. Crooked dog trainer Frank Redfern tries to prevent Billy Grosvenor's dog, "Wild Boy", from running in the Greyhound Derby. But Billy outwits him.

== Cast ==
- Sonnie Hale as Billy Grosvenor
- Gwyneth Lloyd as Marjorie Warren
- Bud Flanagan as Dick Smith
- Chesney Allen as auctioneer and bookmaker
- Lyn Harding as Frank Redfern
- Leonora Corbett as Gladys Scrivener
- Ronald Squire as Rollo
- Fred Kitchen as Joe Plumer
- Arthur Sinclair as P. Murphy
- Cyril Smith as kennel boy
- Mick the Miller as Wild Boy

== Production ==
The film was produced by Gainsborough Pictures at Lime Grove Studios, with sets designed by Alfred Junge.

== Reception ==
Kine Weekly wrote: "The team work is excellent, the pace is adequate, while the climax is as exciting as it is satisifactory. Altogether a sound job of work, very good popular entertamment, a film which has a ready made public in the vast legions of greyhound enthusiasts."

The Daily Film Renter wrote: "Realistic dog track atmosphere, with stirring race sequences and absorbing peeps behind the scenes. Straightforward story dominated by famous greyhound given exceptional opportunities to display athletic prowess and intelligence. Powerful development, sublime comedy from Flanagan and Allen, and gripping 'Derby' climax. First-class popular entertainment, with irresistible appeal to great majority of halls and multitude of greyhound fans."

Picturegoer wrote: "There is little to distinguish it from the usual run of horse-racing pictures, except that dogs are substituted for horses; the villainy and love interest remain quite conventional. However, Albert de Courville has made quite a good job of it in an ingenuous manner which disarms serious criticism. It can be classed as quite good fun, and the dog-racing incidents, at any rate, are interesting and exciting."

Picture Show wrote: "The well-known greyhound star gives an amazingly good performance, and proves his remarkable intelligence together with his great speed. Flanagan and Allen supply the comedy from new angles – bookmakers and auctioneers."
