= Miss London Ltd. =

- Directed by: Val Guest
- Written by: Marriott Edgar; Val Guest
- Produced by: Edward Black
- Cinematography: Basil Emmott
- Edited by: R. E. Dearing
- Music by: Bob Busby
- Production company: Lime Grove Studios (credited as Gaumont British)
- Distributed by: Gainsborough Pictures
- Release date: 14 June 1943
- Running time: 99 minutes
- Country: United Kingdom
- Language: English

Miss London Ltd. is a 1943 British black-and-white comedy musical directed by Val Guest and starring Arthur Askey and Evelyn Dall. It was written by Guest and Marriott Edgar and produced by Edward Black for Gainsborough Pictures. It was Guest's directorial debut.

== Plot ==
Miss London Ltd. (full film)

Arthur Boden runs "Miss London", the escort agency he inherited from his mother. Soon he is joined by his new American partner, Terry Arden, who has inherited half of the agency from her parents. The first thing she accomplishes is to clean up the office. To renew the files of escort ladies Boden and Terry go searching. Boden is assigned to a railway station where he finds clerk Gail Martin to hire. The opening sequence of the film features Martin singing "The 8.50 Choo Choo For Waterloo Choo" at Waterloo station.

The film features a surreal self-parodying sequence in which Boden, in order to gain entrance to a hotel, pretends to be the famous Arthur Askey, using some of his catchphrases. Other spoofs include Askey and Dall in a routine as Fred Astaire and Ginger Rogers and, with Jack Train, as the three Marx Brothers.

== Cast ==
- Arthur Askey as Arthur Boden
- Evelyn Dall as Terry Arden
- Anne Shelton as Gail Martin
- Richard Hearne as Commodore Joshua Wellington
- Max Bacon as Romero
- Jack Train as Joe Nelson
- Peter Graves as Captain Michael "Rory" O'More
- Jean Kent as tmThe Encyclopedia Girl
- Ronald Shiner as Sailor Meredith
- Iris Lang
- Virginia Keiley
- Una Shepherd
- Sheila Bligh
- Noni Brooke
- Patricia Owens as Miss London
- Hilda Campbell Russell as Cabaret Singer

== Production ==
Guest wrote the script which was going to be directed by Marcel Verney. Guest used the reviews for his 1942 short The Nose Has It to get the job directing the film and Ted Black agreed. Guest wrote a part for Jean Kent especially and says Arthur Crabtree was very helpful telling him about camera angles. Guest says the film was "a big success."

== Reception ==
The Monthly Film Bulletin wrote: "There are a number of appalling longeurs (mainly in the crooning sequences) during which the film loses speed, but in other parts whers Askey is allowed his head there are some very amusing moments, and his acting is now considerably better than in his recent films. Jack Train, as Askey's stooge, Max Bacon as a coy and romantically-minded head waiter, and Richard Hearne as a jitterbugging commodore, add to the general comedy atmosphere. The girls, headed by crooners Evelyn Dall and Anne Shelton, have the hard glamour and comely bodies wanted by "escort girls" and the general situations lend themselves to some smut, and occasionally a little wit in the dialogue."

In British Sound Films: The Studio Years 1928–1959 David Quinlan rated the film as "average", writing: "Good songs (lyrics by director Val Guest) and some amusing moments; a bit long."

Leslie Halliwell said: "Flagwaving light entertainment with popular performers of the time."

== Soundtrack ==
All songs by Val Guest and Manning Sherwin.

- Evelyn Dall and Anne Shelton – "A Fine How Do You Do"
- Evelyn Dall – "Keep Cool Calm and Collected"
- Arthur Askey – "The Moth"
- Arthur Askey – "I'm Only Me"
- Anne Shelton – "You Too Can Have a Lovely Romance"
- Anne Shelton – "The 8.50 Choo Choo"
- Anne Shelton – "If You Could Only Cook"
- "My Father Was a Yes Man"
