= Bank Holiday (film) =

1938 British film by Carol Reed

- Directed by: Carol Reed
- Written by: Rodney Ackland; Roger Burford
- Based on: story by Hans Wilhelm; Rodney Ackland
- Produced by: Edward Black
- Starring: John Lodge; Margaret Lockwood; Hugh Williams
- Cinematography: Arthur Crabtree
- Edited by: R. E. Dearing
- Music by: Louis Levy
- Production company: Gainsborough Pictures
- Distributed by: Gaumont British Distributors; General Film Distributors
- Release date: 27 January 1938
- Running time: 86 minutes 81 minutes (censored)
- Country: United Kingdom
- Language: English

Bank Holiday (also known as Three on a Weekend) is a 1938 British drama film directed by Carol Reed and starring John Lodge, Margaret Lockwood, Hugh Williams and Kathleen Harrison. The film was popular and helped establish Carol Reed's reputation.

== Plot ==
On a 1930s bank holiday weekend, a number of people rush for trains to head to the seaside. They include: an unmarried couple, nurse Catherine Lawrence and her boyfriend Geoffrey. Catherine is distracted by thoughts of Stephen Howard, widower of a patient who died in childbirth; May and Arthur and their working-class family; two female friends, Doreen and Milly, looking for romance and Doreen to win a beauty contest.

== Cast ==
- John Lodge as Stephen Howard
- Margaret Lockwood as Catherine Lawrence
- Hugh Williams as Geoffrey
- Rene Ray as Doreen Richards
- Merle Tottenham as Milly
- Linden Travers as Ann Howard
- Wally Patch as Arthur
- Kathleen Harrison as May
- Garry Marsh as 'Follies' manager
- Jeanne Stuart as Miss Mayfair
- Wilfrid Lawson as Police sergeant
- Felix Aylmer as surgeon
- Leonard Sharp as Jack, the petrol pump attendant
- Michael Rennie as Welsh Guardsman (uncredited)

== Production ==
It was the third collaboration between Reed and Lockwood. Actor Michael Rennie appeared (uncredited) as a Welsh Guardsman in the film.

== Reception ==
The Monthly Film Bulletin wrote: "The comedy of the Cockney family, and of "Miss Balham" the would-be beauty queen and her confidante, is rather hackneyed also the playing of the cockney characters is inclined to be theatrical, except in the case of Wally Patch, who gives a delightfully naturalistic performance. The dramatic element is extremely well-served by John Lodge, who is really moving as the young husband, and by Margaret Lockwood. An unforgettable piece of character acting is provided by Wilfred Lawson as a police sergeant who has to interrogate Margaret Lockwood when the car in which she has begged a lift to London is stopped by the police. There are many minor improbabilities in the plot, and the use of strong tragedy as a kind of subplot is perhaps open to question; but the excellent acting and brilliant direction, coupled with the fact that the plot deals with the realities of English life, give it a vividness that makes it definitely a film to see."

The Sunday Express called it "'one of the ablest pieces of picture-making to come out of a British studio."

Lockwood was voted third best actress of 1938 by the readers of Film Weekly.
