= O-Kay for Sound =

- Opening titles
- Directed by: Marcel Varnel
- Written by: Bert Lee (play); R. P. Weston (play); Marriott Edgar; Val Guest
- Produced by: Edward Black
- Starring: The Crazy Gang; Fred Duprez; Graham Moffatt; Enid Stamp Taylor
- Cinematography: Jack E. Cox
- Edited by: R. E. Dearing
- Music by: Louis Levy
- Production company: Gainsborough Pictures
- Distributed by: Gaumont British Distributors
- Release date: 22 April 1937
- Running time: 86 minutes
- Country: United Kingdom
- Language: English

O-Kay for Sound is a 1937 British comedy film directed by Marcel Varnel and starring the Crazy Gang troupe of comedians. It was written by Marriott Edgar and Val Guest based on the stage show by Bert Lee and R. P. Weston. It was made at Islington Studios by Gainsborough Pictures, with sets designed by the art director Alex Vetchinsky. The film was re-issued in 1942.

== Plot ==
After falling on hard times the members of the Crazy Gang are busking on the streets of London. After are hired as extras on a film set, on arriving at the studios are mistaken for a group of potential investors and given free run of the studios, causing chaos.

== Main cast ==
- Jimmy Nervo as Cecil
- Teddy Knox as Teddy
- Bud Flanagan as Bud
- Chesney Allen as "Ches"
- Charlie Naughton as Charlie
- Jimmy Gold as Jimmy
- Fred Duprez as Hyman Goldberger
- Enid Stamp-Taylor as Jill Smith, secretary
- Meinhart Maur as Guggenheimer
- Graham Moffatt as Albert, the page boy
- Patricia Bowman as dancer
- Peter Dawson as singer
- Jan Gotch as all-in wrestler
- H. F. Maltby as John Rigby
- Louis Pergantes as all-in wrestler
- The Sherman Fisher Girls as dancers
- Louis Levy as conductor

== Reception ==
The Monthly Film Bulletin wrote: "The comedy is sometimes broad but always funny; the film moves at a rattling pace ... There is enough plot to hold the film together and to weld into a unity the many and various scenes: ballet (first serious, then comic), plantation songs, burlesque Indian frontier melodrama and custard-pie. Throughout the 'Crazy Gang' display their powers of entertainment, with cleverly introduced interludes by other music-hall experts, such as Lucienne and Ashour, the Robinis, the Radio Three and the J. Sherman Fisher Girls."

Kine Weekly wrote: "The famous Crazy Gang are all here, and they fool with unflagging energy. The show could have been a little more compact, but taken all round it is bright and breezy. It is a good comedy bet for London, and it is to be hoped that the stars have the same pull in the provinces. It is worth a chance. ... The film is on the long side, but bright situations and gags turn up with sufficient frequency to keep the entertainment on a cheery level."
