= The Ghost Train (1941 film) =

1941 British film by Walter Forde

- Detail Spanish theatrical poster
- Directed by: Walter Forde
- Written by: Marriott Edgar (dialogue); Val Guest (dialogue); J. O. C. Orton (writer)
- Based on: play The Ghost Train by Arnold Ridley
- Produced by: Edward Black
- Starring: Arthur Askey; Richard Murdoch
- Cinematography: Jack E. Cox
- Edited by: R. E. Dearing
- Music by: Walter Goehr
- Production company: Gainsborough Pictures
- Distributed by: General Film Distributors
- Release date: 3 May 1941 (UK)
- Running time: 85 minutes
- Country: United Kingdom
- Language: English

The Ghost Train is a 1941 British thriller mystery film directed by Walter Forde and starring Arthur Askey and Richard Murdoch. It is based on the 1923 play The Ghost Train by Arnold Ridley.

The film is set in Cornwall. Several passengers leave a train, and find no other train available at the train station. They are stranded there during a rainy night, and learn that the station is supposedly haunted by a ghost train.

The full film

== Plot ==
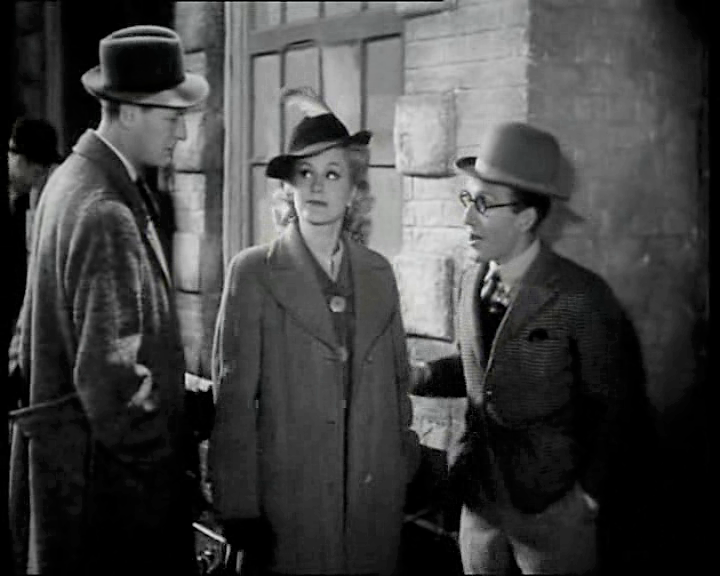
Arthur Askey (right) with Richard Murdoch (left) and Carole Lynne (centre)

Tommy Gander, a music hall comedian, pulls the communication cord on a GWR express train, bringing it to a stop so he can retrieve his hat. Returning to the train, he escapes an angry conductor by ducking into a compartment occupied by attractive blonde Jackie Winthrop, with whom Gander flirts. Another passenger, Teddy, has his eye on Jackie as well, but her companion Richard Winthrop ejects both of them from the compartment.

When the train stops at Fal Vale Junction, Cornwall, these four get off to change trains, as do Herbert and his fiancée Edna, spinster Miss Bourne, and the tippling Dr Sterling. However, the stationmaster, Saul Hodgkin tells them the last Truro-bound train has gone, and that they cannot remain at the station, as he is locking up for the night. The passengers insist on staying, as it is raining heavily and the nearest village is 4 mi (6.4 km) away.

Hodgkin warns them the station is haunted. A branch line once crossed the river on a swing bridge close to the station. One night 43 years ago, then stationmaster Ted Holmes had a fatal heart attack while attempting to close the bridge, causing a train to plunge into the river. Ever since, a phantom train has been heard periodically on the abandoned track. It is said to kill anyone who looks upon it.

With that, he reluctantly leaves them. As the passengers make themselves as comfortable as they can, they hear footsteps outside. Richard opens the door, and Hodgkin collapses into the room. Dr Sterling pronounces him dead. Later, a terrified young woman in black appears. She, Julia, pleads for help, saying that someone is pursuing her. A car spins off the road and crashes into a tree. The driver is unhurt, but his car is damaged. Back in the waiting room, he introduces himself as John Price and explains that he is searching for his sister Julia, who he says has delusions. Julia protests that he is lying. Price further explains that she thought she had seen the ghost train, and became obsessed with it ever since. The passengers tell him that Hodgkin has died. When Price insists on seeing the body, they discover it has mysteriously vanished.

Price leaves to arrange transportation. Then an approaching train is heard. Unable to open the doors to the platform as it thunders past, Julia smashes a window to look at it, then screams and faints. They hear singing from the nearby railway tunnel mouth. Julia claims that Ben Isaacs, the sole survivor of the accident, is coming back. Teddy shoots at the "ghost", causing it to flee back into the tunnel, leaving behind a bloodstained cloth.

Teddy shows the others the cloth and orders the others, at gunpoint, to stay put until the police arrive, but Richard punches him, knocking him out. The passengers carry him to the bus Price has obtained. When Teddy comes to, he is furious with Richard, as now there will be no one to intercept the train on its return journey. When Gander remarks that he had returned the bridge to the open position, Dr. Sterling suddenly orders the bus driver to stop, while his confederate, Price, produces his own gun. Sterling orders the driver to turn back so they can warn the train.

Meanwhile, guns are being loaded aboard the "ghost train"; a very much alive Hodgkin flags the train off and climbs aboard. Teddy explains that the train is really being used by Nazi fifth columnists to secretly transport arms. While Price heads down the embankment with Julia and the driver to try to stop the train, Teddy knocks Sterling out and gains control of the situation. The train plunges into the river.

== Cast ==
- Arthur Askey as Tommy Gander
- Richard Murdoch as Teddy Deakin
- Kathleen Harrison as Miss Bourne
- Peter Murray-Hill as R.G. Winthrop
- Carole Lynne as Jackie Winthrop
- Morland Graham as Dr. Sterling
- Betty Jardine as Edna
- Stuart Latham as Herbert
- Herbert Lomas as Saul Hodgkin
- Raymond Huntley as John Price
- Linden Travers as Julia Price
- D. J. Williams as Ben Isaacs
- George Merritt as Inspector
- Sidney Monckton as Train Guard
- Wallace Bosco as Ted Holmes
- William Thomas Jones as Chauffeur

== Production ==
The first sound film version was released in 1931 with Jack Hulbert. The Askey version was announced in August 1939. The script had to be rewritten to accommodate Askey; the actions of Hulbert's part were divided between the comic star and Richard Murdoch.

Filming did not proceed immediately; in January 1941 reports said Carol Reed would direct and Edward Black would produce. Eventually the job of directing went to Walter Forde who had made the earlier sound version.

Filming began in February 1941. It was an early role for Carole Lynn who had been discovered dancing on the West End. Shooting took place at the Lime Grove Studios in Shepherd's Bush, with sets designed by the art director Alex Vetchinsky. Some location shots were also taken around Teignmouth and Dawlish Warren in Devon.

== Critical reception ==
The Monthly Film Bulletin wrote: "The film is a remake, with up-to-date dialogue, of Arnold Ridley's famous play, and is extremely well directed and produced. The photography is most effective, and of course, since Arthur Askey plays the part of Tommy Gander, comedian, the fun is fast and furious in spite of the increasing tension as the plot develops. There are three other most admirable performances in this film, to wit, Kathleen Harrison spinster visiting evacuees, Morland Graham as Dr. Sterling and Herbert Lomas as the stationmaster."

Sight & Sound called it "funnier and more ghostly than the original".

British film critic Leslie Halliwell said: "Adequate remake with the lead split into two characters, which doesn't work quite as well."

The Radio Times Guide to Films gave the film 3/5 stars, writing: "Arthur Askey and Richard Murdoch, the stars of the hit radio show Band Waggon, were reunited for this flag-waving remake of the classic play by Arnold Ridley about a haunted country station. Try as director Walter Forde might to inject some atmosphere, there's a predictability about both the proceedings and the comedy. Askey was never at his best on screen and his energetic overacting has dated badly."

TV Guide noted the film was "good for a few laughs and a couple of chilling surprises."

== Soundtrack ==
Arthur Askey – "The Seaside Band" (Kenneth Blain) – (UK DECCA F 9944 10" 78 rpm shellac PICTURE LABELS)
