= Gasbag =

Gasbag may refer to:

- Balloon, a bag filled with gas
- Hot air balloon for manned flight uses a fabric gas bag or "lifting envelope".
- Gas bladder, contributes to the ability of a fish to control its buoyancy

== See also ==
- Gasbags, 1941 British comedy film
