= Together Again (TV series) =

1957 British TV variety series

Together Again was a British television comedy/music variety series which aired for six episodes in 1957. It starred Bud Flanagan and Chesney Allen. The half-hour series was produced by Jack Hylton for Associated-Rediffusion. The series survives intact but has yet to appear on home video.
