= Wise Guys (1937 film) =

1937 British film by Harry Langdon

- Jimmy Gold and Charlie Naughton in the film
- Directed by: Harry Langdon
- Written by: Alison Booth; David Evans
- Produced by: Ivor McLaren
- Starring: Audrene Brier; Charlie Naughton; Jimmy Gold
- Cinematography: Stanley Grant
- Production company: Wembley Studios
- Release date: 1937
- Country: United Kingdom
- Language: English

Wise Guys is a 1937 British comedy film directed by Harry Langdon and starring Audrene Brier, Charlie Naughton and Jimmy Gold. It was written by Alison Booth and David Evans and was made as a quota quickie.

The British Film Institute National Archive holds a collection of stills but no film or video materials.

== Plot ==
In Edinburgh, elderly and wealthy Phineas McNaughton wants to bequeath his fortunes to his surviving relatives, and places a newspaper advertisement to trace them all. His hard-up nephews Charlie and Jimmy see it, and to raise funds to go to Edinburgh they visit the racecourse, and win enough to travel. American gangster Eddie and his moll Flo also see the advertisement, and Flo decides to pose as Phineas's niece, leading to inevitable complications.

== Cast ==
- Audrene Brier as Flo
- Charlie Naughton as Charlie
- Jimmy Gold as Jimmy
- Robert Nainby as Phineas McNaughton
- Walter Roy as Drake
- Sydney Keith as Eddie
- David Kier as a lawyer

== Reception ==
The Monthly Film Bulletin wrote: "The direction is good, and some of the backgrounds are excellent ... The acting is good, Naughton and Gold giving their usual expressive performances and being well supported by the rest of the cast."

The Daily Film Renter wrote: "Singularly unfunny 'comedy' ... Put over in terms of outmoded gags and mediocre slapstick, action affords co-stars threadbare material, while production values are crude. Very poor stuff. Naughton and Gold, celebrated music-hall comics, are made to participate in a series of olden-day gags and crude slapstick stunts. ... Production values are of an undistinguished order."

Kine Weekly wrote: "Cheap haphazard knockabout comedy, amounting to lithe more than a tedious parade of hackneyed slapstick gags. Naughton and Gold, popular stars of the music hall, do their best to make something of the threadbare plot, but retire heavily defeated. The support is of no account, nor are the direction and presentation. Quota booking for the uncritical."

Picture Show wrote: "This film is obviously built round the cheery personalities of Naughton and Gold. There is little story, but the couple extract plenty of laughs from the slapstick comedy situations in the film."

Picturegoer wrote: "Very indifferent slapstick comedy, which has little rhyme or reason and is generally extremely hackneyed in idea. Neither Naughton nor Gold is able to get the better of the poor material with which they are supplied."
