= Eric Clavering =

British-Canadian actor (1901–1989)

- in 49th Parallel (1941)
- Born: 15 March 1901; London, England
- Died: 10 June 1989 (aged 88); Toronto, Ontario, Canada
- Other name: Eric George Simon
- Occupation: Actor
- Years active: 1934–1981 (film)
- Spouse: Marion Gillon (5 December 1941 - ?) ( her death)
- Children: 4

Eric Clavering (15 March 1901 – 10 June 1989) was a British-born actor who spent much of his career in Canada. He played supporting roles in a number of British films during the Second World War. He later moved to Canada, and had a recurring role on the Canadian television series The Forest Rangers. He is buried at Beechwood Cemetery in Vaughan, Ontario.

== Selected filmography ==
- Undercover Men (1934) - Madigan
- Thoroughbred (1936)
- Mr. Satan (1938) - Wilson
- Where's That Fire? (1939) - Hank Sullivan
- The Frozen Limits (1939) - Foxy
- Neutral Port (1940) - (uncredited)
- Sailors Three (1940) - Bartender
- Gasbags (1941) - Scharffuehrer
- The Patient Vanishes (1941) - Al Meason
- The Saint's Vacation (1941) - Reporter at door (uncredited)
- Facing the Music (1941)
- Tower of Terror (1941) - Riemers (uncredited)
- 49th Parallel (1941) - Art
- The Saint Meets the Tiger (1941) - Frankie
- South American George (1941) - Mr. Durrant
- The Missing Million (1942) - Parker
- The Day Will Dawn (1942) - American Sailor at Bia Tonne in Oslo (uncredited)
- Front Line Kids (1942) - Carl
- Suspected Person (1942) - Roxy Dolan
- Much Too Shy (1942) - Robert Latimer
- The Saint Meets the Tiger (1943)
- Bush Pilot (1947)
- The Incredible Journey (1963) - Bert Oakes
- Isabel (1968) - Postmaster
- Smith! (1969) - Alexander (uncredited)
- To Kill a Clown (1972) - Stanley
- The Hard Part Begins (1973) - Ralph
- Sunday in the Country (1974) - Station Master
- Lions for Breakfast (1975) - Passer-by (uncredited)
- Sudden Fury (1975) - Station Attendant
- Welcome to Blood City (1977) - 1st Old Man
- Improper Channels (1981) - Wino
- Threshold (1981) - Old Man in Recovery (final film role)

== Bibliography ==
- Hodgson, Michael. Patricia Roc. Author House, 2013.
