= Bees in Paradise =

1944 British film by Val Guest

- British trade ad
- Directed by: Val Guest
- Written by: Marriott Edgar; Val Guest
- Produced by: Edward Black
- Starring: Arthur Askey; Anne Shelton; Peter Graves
- Cinematography: Phil Grindrod
- Edited by: R. E. Dearing
- Music by: Louis Levy
- Production company: Gainsborough Pictures
- Distributed by: General Film Distributors
- Release date: 20 March 1944
- Running time: 72 minutes
- Country: United Kingdom
- Language: English

Bees in Paradise is a 1944 British musical comedy film directed by Val Guest and starring Arthur Askey, Anne Shelton and Peter Graves. It was produced by Edward Black at Gainsborough Pictures. Co-written by Guest and comic Marriott Edgar, this is a lesser known Askey vehicle.

== Plot ==
The Queen of Paradise Island, an uncharted isle somewhere in the Atlantic Ocean (northwest of Freetown, Sierra Leone), is not happy. The town crier of the all-female hive-like colony (around two thousand strong) has just reported that there have only been two births within the last eighteen months and both of them were boys. As the Queen points out to Jani, her Minister of Propaganda: the only thing worse than boys is men. She demands more marriages, even going as far to think about passing conscription into law. However, Jani points out that the drones (which is how the inhabitants of this island refer to men) are not willing to marry because after a two-month honeymoon the bridegrooms are executed.

An Allied bomber plane gets into trouble. The four aircrew bail out and parachute down on Paradise Island. They are quickly captured by the native woman and Rouna, the colony's leading journalist, sets her eye on the diminutive Arthur Tucker, the mechanic.

Brought before the queen, the airmen try to ingratiate themselves. The queen explains that they are free to move around the island and if rescued they will be permitted to leave. However, she encourages them to stay and marry within the colony. She hints at the death sentence, but the airmen fail to pick up on the implication.

Escorted around the town by guards, Arthur confesses he might be in love with redheaded Jani. However, he has been betrothed to Rouana, who desperately flirts with him. He avoids her and continues to chase Jani, but to no avail. She is more interested in Peter, the pilot, who in turn has fallen in love with her. She tries to prevent his falling for her, as she knows it will result in his death.

Arthur and his friend Max sneak into the holy Temple of the Hive, where the island's law is written, and there they learn of the two-month honeymoon and subsequent death sentence. They also learn that the law states a betrothal occurs whenever a woman and a man share wine.

At the town's baths, Jani discovers that many of the islanders are disenchanted with how the men have been allocated. Jani tries to reassure everyone that no one is officially betrothed yet. Various ideas are thrown around, including communism. Jani decides to be noble and offers a solution (even if it means losing her chance of romance with Peter). The cup final of the island's rugby league takes place tomorrow; the winning team will draw lots and the lucky four who win will get the men.

The scheduled rugby match gets under way the next day, with Arthur refereeing. Arthur is knocked out during play and when he wakes in Rouana's home she tricks him into drinking wine with her. Panicked, Arthur flees.

With Peter and Jani's help, Arthur disguises himself as a maid in Jani's household. Arthur tries to convince Jani that he loves her, but she ignores him, and he is pounced on by Rouana again. Arthur makes a rooftop escape, but ends up falling through the roof of the queen's bedchamber. Arthur tries to explain to her that the island's laws are ridiculous, but the queen refuses to listen; however, she does not give him away when the palace guard rush in.

The next day, Rouana requests in court that the death sentence be waived for her and Arthur, as there is a precedent. Twenty years ago, one woman fell so in love with a man that the law was overturned. However, when Arthur is put on the witness stand, he admits he does not love Rouana. This results in his being condemned to death (by being forced to leap off the highest cliff).

By the morning of the execution, Ronnie, the aircrew's radio operator, has managed to repair the plane's radio. Rescue is on its way. Arthur is rescued by Ronnie and Max in drag, and they all escape to the beach, where Jani has arranged for a boat to be waiting for them.

== Cast ==
- Arthur Askey as Arthur Tucker
- Anne Shelton as Rouana
- Peter Graves as Peter Lovell
- Max Bacon as Max Adler
- Ronald Shiner as Ronald Wild
- Jean Kent as Jani
- Antoinette Cellier as The Queen
- Joy Shelton as Almura
- Beatrice Varley as Moagga

== Soundtrack ==
All songs written by Val Guest and Manning Sherwin.

- Anne Shelton – "Keep a Sunbeam in Your Pocket".
- The Four in Harmony – "Women are the Greatest Ones".
- Jean Kent – "I'm a Wolf on My Mother's Side".
- Arthur Askey and Anne Shelton – "It Can Happen Anywhere".
- Jean Kent and Arthur Askey – "Are You Naturally Romantic?".
- Arthur Askey and Max Bacon – "Keep a Sunbeam in Your Pocket (Reprise)".
- The Four in Harmony, Anne Shelton, Jean Kent, and Peter Graves – "Don't Ever Leave Me".
- Anne Shelton and Joy Shelton – "The Age of Discretion".
- Arthur Askey and Anne Shelton – "Going Hither and Dither with You".

== Production ==
Ostensibly set on a tropical island, the movie was filmed on location in Torquay. Askey records in his autobiography that whilst filming the crew was strafed by the Luftwaffe and he was slightly injured as a result.

Val Guest made his directorial debut with Miss London Ltd starring Askey with Jean Kent in a support part. This was Guest's second film; he was reunited with Askey and promoted Kent to leading lady.

== Critical reception ==
The Monthly Film Bulletin wrote: "The film is weak in construction and dialogue and the finale comes quite inconclusively and without tying up a number of loose ends. The continual jest of the male-hunting female soon palls and Paradise Island quickly belies its name. Arthur Askey has to carry too much of the fun with insufficient material to work on and is not too well supported by the cast. Costumes, script and acting condd all be improved with advantage."

David Parkinson wrote in the Radio Times, "there's a sauciness to the dialogue and lyrics that makes it rather risqué for its time."

Leslie Halliwell said: "Saucy farce, too talkative to be very interesting even in the dark days of war."

TV Guide called the film "a silly notion gone crazy ... Not only that, but we get music, too, which is about as frothy as the premise."
