= My Lucky Star (1933 film) =

- Directed by: Louis Blattner; John Harlow
- Written by: Louis Blattner; John Harlow; Reginald Purdell; Peter Traill
- Produced by: Louis Blattner
- Starring: Florence Desmond; Oscar Asche; Harry Tate
- Cinematography: Geoffrey Faithfull
- Edited by: Ted Richards
- Music by: Louis Blattner
- Production company: Masquerader
- Distributed by: Woolf and Freedman
- Release date: June 1933
- Running time: 63 minutes
- Country: United Kingdom
- Language: English

My Lucky Star is a 1933 British comedy film directed by Louis Blattner and John Harlow and starring Florence Desmond, Oscar Asche and Harry Tate. It was made at Elstree Studios as a quota quickie. A young woman working in a shop poses as a film star.

== Cast ==
- Florence Desmond as Mlle. de Capo
- Oscar Asche as President of Film Company
- Charlie Naughton as House Painter
- Jimmy Gold as House Painter
- Harry Tate as Film Director Monty
- Harold Huth as Hero
- Carol Coombe as Lucette
- Reginald Purdell as Artist
- Herman Darewski as Conductor
- George Baker as Foreman Painter
- Henry B. Longhurst as Dudley Collins
- Alfred Atkins as Studio Commissionaire
- Ernest Jay as Press Agent
- Della Rega as Mlle. de Capo's Dresser

== Bibliography ==
- Chibnall, Steve. Quota Quickies: The Birth of the British 'B' Film. British Film Institute, 2007.
- Low, Rachael. Filmmaking in 1930s Britain. George Allen & Unwin, 1985.
- Wood, Linda. British Films, 1927-1939. British Film Institute, 1986.
