= Public Nuisance No. 1 =

1936 film

- Theatrical release poster
- Directed by: Marcel Varnel
- Written by: Franz Arnold; Roger Burford; Robert Edmunds; Val Guest
- Produced by: Hermann Fellner; Max Schach
- Starring: Frances Day; Arthur Riscoe; Muriel Aked
- Cinematography: Claude Friese-Greene
- Edited by: Edward B. Jarvis
- Music by: Benjamin Frankel
- Production company: Cecil Films
- Distributed by: General Film Distributors
- Release date: 25 February 1936
- Running time: 78 minutes
- Country: United Kingdom
- Language: English

Public Nuisance No. 1 (also known as Public Nuisance No. 1 A Musical Extravaganza) is a 1936 British musical comedy film directed by Marcel Varnel and starring Frances Day, Arthur Riscoe and Muriel Aked. It was written by Franz Arnold, Roger Burford, Robert Edmunds and Val Guest and made at Beaconsfield Studios. The screenplay concerns a young man who goes to work as a waiter at his uncle's hotel in Nice.

== Plot ==
Arthur Rawlings is a wealthy young chap about town who meets and falls for shop assistant Frances Travers. When his uncle decides Arthur should work for a living, he gets him a job as a waiter at a hotel he owns on the Riviera, but turns out to be useless. Arthur arranges for Frances to join him, by fixing her winning of a charity sweepstake. Oblivious to his identity, Frances helps him by tricking the guests to leave a nearby big hotel, and filling Arthur's uncle's hotel instead, leading to comic adventures. Finally, the uncle arrives and blesses the marriage of Frances and Arthur.

== Cast ==
- Frances Day as Frances Travers
- Arthur Riscoe as Arthur Rawlings
- Muriel Aked as Mis Trumps
- Claude Dampier as Feather
- Peter Haddon as Richard Trelawny
- Sebastian Smith as Mr. Snelling
- Robert Nainby as Arthur Rawlings Senior
- Syd Crossley as policeman
- Anthony Holles as head waiter
- Wally Patch as hotel doorman (uncredited)

== Reception ==
The Monthly Film Bulletin wrote: "There is no plot; the film consists of a series of situations and gags interspersed with songs. Arthur Riscoe and Frances Day work hard, but with unsatisfactory material. Some of the interior camera work is clever."

Kine Weekly wrote: "The story does not matter much, but situations are neatly devised, smartly dialogued, and the technical qualities generally are good. ... Arthur Riscoe is in great form as Arthur. He works indefatigably to put over the comedy, and sings two or three song numbers very effectively. Frances Day is also well cast and scores a big hit for her vocal number, 'Me and My Dog'."
