= No Monkey Business =

- Opening titles
- Directed by: Marcel Varnel
- Written by: Joe May; Károly Nóti; Roger Burford; Val Guest
- Produced by: Julius Haimann; C. M. Woolf
- Starring: Gene Gerrard; June Clyde; Renée Houston; Richard Hearne
- Cinematography: Claude Friese-Greene
- Edited by: Edward B. Jarvis
- Music by: Hans May; Benjamin Frankel
- Production company: Radius Productions
- Distributed by: General Film Distributors
- Release date: 12 November 1935
- Running time: 78 minutes
- Country: United Kingdom
- Language: English

No Monkey Business is a 1935 British comedy film directed by Marcel Varnel and starring Gene Gerrard, June Clyde and Renée Houston. It was written by Joe May, Károly Nóti (as Karl Noti), Roger Burford and Val Guest.

== Plot ==
After a music hall performer has his performing partner, an ape, confiscated by his financial creditors he persuades his assistant to dress up and impersonate the animal so that he can continue his act. However a series of embarrassments arise when they are invited to stay at a country house by a young woman who wishes to demonstrate to her father her theory that apes are as intelligent as people.

== Cast ==
- Gene Gerrard as Jim Carroll
- June Clyde as Clare Barrington
- Renée Houston as Jessie
- Richard Hearne as Charlie
- Peter Haddon as Arthur
- Claude Dampier as Roberts
- Hugh Wakefield as Professor Barrington
- Fred Duprez as theatre manager
- Clifford Heatherley as bailiff
- O. B. Clarence as Professor
- Robert Nainby as Professor
- Reuben Castang as ape trainer
- Alexander Field as greengrocer
- Hal Gordon as circus proprietor
- Wally Patch as stage hand
- Charles Paton as lodging house keeper

== Production ==
The film was made by the independent company Radius Productions at the British and Dominion Studios at Elstree.

== Reception ==
The Monthly Film Bulletin wrote: "A cheerful and amusing film, a trifle padded in places and rushing to a sudden conclusion, but rich in comic situations of which the actors take full advantage. ... This type of film especially depends on experienced acting to make the most of its material and here the cast is uniformly good."

Kine Weekly wrote: "Farcical comedy extravaganza, a farrago of conventional but popular nonsense which turns at a smooth pace on the never failing pivot of animal impersonation. The tone of the humour, which is closely allied to the music hall, is, of course, definitely old fashioned, but there is enough new life injected into it by the strong and talented cast for it to get over once again with the masses."
