= Cottage to Let =

1941 British film by Anthony Asquith

- Theatrical release poster
- Directed by: Anthony Asquith
- Written by: J. O. C. Orton; Anatole de Grunwald
- Based on: play Cottage to Let by Geoffrey Kerr
- Produced by: Edward Black
- Starring: Leslie Banks; Alastair Sim; John Mills; George Cole
- Cinematography: Jack E. Cox
- Edited by: R. E. Dearing
- Music by: Charles Williams
- Production company: Gainsborough Pictures
- Distributed by: General Film Distributors (UK)
- Release date: 6 September 1941 (UK)
- Running time: 90 minutes
- Country: United Kingdom
- Language: English

Cottage to Let (also known as Bombsight Stolen) is a 1941 British spy thriller film directed by Anthony Asquith starring Leslie Banks, Alastair Sim and John Mills. It was written by J. O. C. Orton and Anatole de Grunwald based on the play of the same title by Geoffrey Kerr. Filmed during the Second World War and set in Scotland during the war, its plot concerns Nazi spies trying to kidnap an inventor.

The film includes the first film appearance of George Cole, as a cocky young evacuee.

== Plot ==
John Barrington, a talented but eccentric inventor, is working at his Scottish country home on a new bombsight for the RAF. His scatter-brained wife takes in child evacuees from London to be accommodated in a nearby cottage they own. But since Charles Dimble has been let the cottage by an estate agency, Mrs Barrington decides they can only take one evacuee, a cocky teenager named Ronald. An injured pilot parachutes into a nearby loch. He is rescued and brought to the house. As a result, the cottage becomes part-hospital, with the Barringtons' daughter, Helen, acting as nurse. The pilot identifies himself as Flight Lieutenant Perry, based at a nearby airfield. When he is given a telephone to contact headquarters, however, he makes the call alone, with the phone wire disconnected.

At the War Office, there is discussion of Barrington, with concern that someone is spying on his top secret work. They suspect his assistant, Alan Trently, who was educated in Germany and still corresponds with people in Switzerland. The War Office decides to investigate. Later, at the Barrington estate, Ronald breaks a house rule by wandering into the laboratory. He overcomes Barrington's initial hostility with his practical know-how and the two become friends. In the meantime, Trently becomes jealous when Helen starts spending time with Perry. However, Helen resists Perry's advances and eventually lets Trently know that she prefers him.

One evening, Barrington is kidnapped by German agents. However, the resourceful Ronald stows away in their car's boot. Both he and the captive Barrington are deposited at an isolated, off-road water mill. After Ronald sneaks into the mill, he spies Perry arriving in a second car. Ronald is shocked when Perry is revealed to be a German intelligence agent, plotting to fly Barrington to Berlin by seaplane. It emerges that Dimble is actually a British counter-intelligence officer, sent by the War Office. He infiltrates Perry's spy ring, and learns where Barrington is being held. All but one of the spies are captured and Ronald and Barrington are freed. Perry initially escapes but is eventually tracked down and killed in a shoot-out with Dimble.

== Cast ==
- Leslie Banks as John Barrington
- Alastair Sim as Charles Dimble
- John Mills as Flight Lieutenant Perry
- Jeanne de Casalis as Mrs Barrington
- Carla Lehmann as Helen Barrington
- George Cole as Ronald
- Michael Wilding as Alan Trently
- Frank Cellier as Ernest Forest
- Muriel Aked as Miss Fernery
- Wally Patch as Evans
- Muriel George as Mrs Trimm
- Hay Petrie as Dr Truscott
- Catherine Lacey as Mrs Stokes
- Annie Esmond as lady wrapping parcels for the bazaar (uncredited)
- Peter Gawthorne as senior RAF officer (uncredited)
- Arthur Hambling as Scotland Yard Inspector (uncredited)
- Roddy Hughes as German agent (uncredited)
- Brefni O'Rorke as Scottish Police Inspector (uncredited)
- Charles Rolfe as German agent (uncredited)
- Ben Williams as Scottish fisherman (uncredited)

== Production ==
The film was shot at the Lime Grove Studios in London, with sets designed by the art director Alex Vetchinsky.

== Reception ==
The Monthly Film Bulletin wrote: "The film is bound to be immensely popular; it is topical and interest is maintained throughout, nor is the humour in which it abounds allowed to delay the action. Jeanne de Casalis is a complete joy as foolish Mrs. Barington, but she never obtrudes on the serious side. The weight of the film falls on Leslie Banks as the scientist, Alastair Sim as Dimble, surprisingly convincing when serious to those who always think of him as funny, and John Mills as the pilot. The only minor blemish was that the Scottish atmosphere was never realistic."

Kine Weekly wrote: "Espionage comedy-melodrama, freely adapted from the recent West End stage success ... Much of the action revolves around the Scottish estate of an inventor, and the many opportunities for amusing social by-play are not missed. Jeanne de Casalis takes care of the light relief in her own inimitable manner as the inventor's fluttering wife. Leslie Banks, Alastair Sim, John Mills and Michael Wilding are wisely entrusted with the versatile stern aspects of the theme. George Cole, a really clever juvenile, has a foot in both camps. His brilliant natural gifts of character drawing effectively preserve the balance of power."

Variety wrote: "Anthony Asquith has directed neatly. John Mills had a tough assignment in the double-identity role of Nazi agent ... Actor turns in a thoughtful performance, emotionally standout in the closing sequences where he's hunted down. Romance is in the hands of Carla Lehman, and she does excellently with very little as daughter-nurse of Leslie Banks, a temperamental inventor of plane gadgets. The Nazis figure to lift plans of Banks' new bombsight, but stumble against Alistair Sim, as British undercover man, plus the sly Holmes-like reasoning of a Cockney kid evacuee. This youngster, George Cole, manages to steal all the scenes he has; he's likable toughy who should bear watching. Sim's cagey playing is a smooth mixture of chill and cheer."
