= Time Flies (1944 film) =

- Opening title
- Directed by: Walter Forde
- Screenplay by: J.O.C. Orton; Ted Kavanagh; Howard Irving Young
- Produced by: Edward Black
- Starring: Tommy Handley; Evelyn Dall; George Moon
- Cinematography: Basil Emmott
- Edited by: R. E. Dearing
- Music by: Bretton Byrd
- Production company: Gainsborough Pictures
- Distributed by: General Film Distributors (UK)
- Release date: 8 May 1944 (UK)
- Running time: 88 minutes
- Country: United Kingdom
- Language: English

Time Flies is a 1944 British comedy film directed by Walter Forde and starring Tommy Handley, Evelyn Dall, Felix Aylmer and Moore Marriott. The screenplay was by J.O.C. Orton, Ted Kavanagh and Howard Irving Young.

The story concerns music hall performers Bill and Susie Barton, inventor Stewart McAndrew and con-man Tommy Handley who all travel back to Elizabethan times using a time machine.

== Plot ==
Entertainers Bill and Susie Barton are on tour when Bill's old friend Tommy shows up soliciting funds for a new scheme, Time Ferry Services Limited. Bill has given Tommy $10,000 to help Professor Stewart McAndrew develop the Time Ball, a primitive time machine. Enraged, Susie goes to the lavish apartment where Tommy and the Professor are staying to demand the money back. However, the group discovers that Tommy is actually a valet and has been pretending to be wealthy by borrowing his employer's apartment and clothes. His boss calls the police and the group hides in the Time Ball. Tommy closes the hatch, accidentally activating the invention, and they are sent back in time to Elizabethan London where Tommy befriends Sir Walter Raleigh and Queen Elizabeth I. He starts a new swindle by claiming to "own" America and selling off pieces of land to members of the court.

The Professor is arrested and jailed in the Tower of London for being a Scottish spy, trapping the group in the past. Meanwhile, Susie meets William Shakespeare and feeds him some of his own lines, which he eagerly writes down. Susie and Bill meet Captain John Smith and Pocahontas in a tavern and steal their identities so they can gain an audience with the queen and ask her to pardon the Professor. However, they are unmasked and sentenced to be executed along with the Professor and Tommy. The queen's soldiers try to burn them alive in the Time Ball, but the professor fixes it and they return to the modern day. However, they show up several weeks too early and gradually fade away due to a temporal paradox.

== Cast ==
- Tommy Handley as Tommy Handley
- Evelyn Dall as Susie Barton
- George Moon as Bill Barton
- Felix Aylmer as Professor Stewart McAndrew
- Moore Marriott as Soothsayer
- Graham Moffatt as Nephew
- John Salew as William Shakespeare
- Leslie Bradley as Captain Walter Raleigh
- Olga Lindo as Queen Elizabeth I
- Roy Emerton as Captain John Smith
- Iris Lang as Princess Pocahontas
- Stéphane Grappelli as Troubadour

== Production ==
It was one of the last films made by Ted Black at Gainsborough. A costume-production, the film made extensive use of the Gainsborough wardrobe.

== Critical reception ==
The Monthly Film Bulletin wrote: "The idea of the story is undoubtedly clever, but its execution is poor. Tommy Handley can never be reckoned a great screen comedian and Evelyn Dall acts far worse than she can croon. Felix Aylmer as the professor is given no scope, and apart from a brief appearance of Moore Marriott in the pillory, Olga Lindo as Queen Elizabeth and one or two pieces of trick photography, the film contains nothing worth a second thought. Once or twice the dialogue is witty and once or twice situations are well exploited, but for the rest the film contains nothing to appeal to any adult mind."

Kine Weekly wrote: "Lavishly staged, but somewhat laboured musical burlesque." Sky Cinema gave the film two out of five stars, stating: "Despite the subject and the cast, the treatment lacks vivacity." TV Guide wrote "A well-tuned script takes full advantages of the possibilities for comedy, but radio star Handley is a bit of a disappointment, looking sourly out of place on the screen." The Radio Times rated it three out of five stars, concluding: "Some of the jokes have travelled less well and it falls flat in places, but it's a thoroughly entertaining romp". In British Sound Films: The Studio Years 1928–1959 David Quinlan rated the film as "average", writing: "Not bad, but good idea should have been more brightly treated."
