= Robert Nainby =

Irish actor (1869–1948)

- Born: 1869
- Died: 1948 (aged 78–79)
- Occupation: Actor

Robert Nainby (1869–1948) was an Irish male actor.

== Filmography ==
Year	Title	Role	Notes
1934	Colonel Blood	Desborough	
1934	Little Friend	Uncle Ned	
1934	Jew Süss		Uncredited
1934	My Old Dutch	Grandpa	
1934	Radio Parade of 1935	Colonel Featherstone Haugh-Haugh	
1935	Dandy Dick	Bale	
1935	Royal Cavalcade	Drinker	
1935	The Student's Romance	Hermann Streudelmeier, Karl's Uncle	
1935	Death on the Set	Lord Umbridge	
1935	No Monkey Business	Professor	
1935	Butter and Egg Man		
1936	When Knights Were Bold	Whittle, the 'boy'	
1936	Public Nuisance No. 1	Arthur Rawlings Senior	
1936	Two's Company	Assistant J.P.	
1936	Chick	Mr. Beane	
1936	Southern Roses	Representative of the Right Centre Party	Uncredited
1936	Land Without Music	Minister for War	
1936	All In	Eustace Slott	
1937	The Lilac Domino	Dr. Biro	
1937	Wise Guys	Phineas McNaughton	
1937	Keep Fit	Judge At The Gym	Uncredited
1937	There Was a Young Man	Vicar	
1937	Under Secret Orders	French General	
1938	Strange Boarders		Uncredited
1938	We're Going to Be Rich	Judge	
1938	Crackerjack		Uncredited, (final film role)
