= Marriott Edgar =

British comedian and poet (1880–1951)

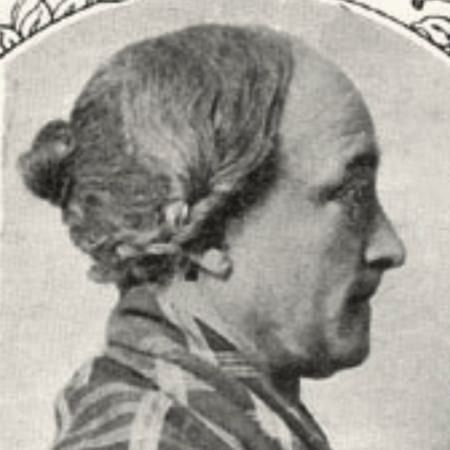
Marriott Edgar in pantomime dame costume

Marriott Edgar (5 October 1880 – 5 May 1951), born George Marriott Edgar in Kirkcudbright, Scotland, was a British poet, scriptwriter and comedian, best known for writing many of the monologues performed by Stanley Holloway, particularly the Albert series. In total he wrote sixteen monologues for Holloway, whilst Holloway himself wrote only five.

== Family background ==
Edgar's great grandfather was James Henry Marriott. His parents were Jane (also known as Jenny; née Taylor), born in London in 1856, and Richard Horatio Marriott Edgar (1847–1894), only son of Alice Marriott (1824–1900), proprietress of the Marriott family theatre troupe. Richard was born in Manchester (then Lancashire), near Christmas 1847 as Richard Horatio Marriott; both his two sisters, Adeline Marriott (b. 1853) and Grace Marriott (b. 1858) were also born in Lancashire, all three out of wedlock. Later all three took the surname of their mother's husband, Robert Edgar, whom she married in 1856.

Richard and Jane married in March 1875, with Richard being unaware that he had fathered an illegitimate namesake son, Richard Horatio Edgar Wallace, with widowed actress Mrs Mary Jane "Polly" Richards, after a brief sexual encounter. Polly, having invented an obligation in London to hide her pregnancy, gave birth in secret on 1 April 1875, almost a month after Richard and Jenny married. This son became the famous journalist, novelist, playwright and screenplay writer, Edgar Wallace.

Richard and Jenny Taylor's children were Alice Marriott Edgar (b. 1876, London), twins Richard and Jennifer Marriott Edgar (b. 1878, London), after whose births the family moved to Scotland, where George was born on 5 October 1880, then returning to London, where Joseph Marriott Edgar was born in 1884 and Adeline Alice Edgar in 1886.

== Early career ==
George Marriott Edgar was a performer, poet and writer. He began his career as a scene-painter, but from 1907 until his death, he was known to the public as a comedian who played pantomime dames. During the First World War he served with the Royal Sussex Regiment and the Mechanical Transport, and afterwards he toured Australia, New Zealand and South Africa with his dame act. In 1929, he joined the cast of The Co-Optimists and worked with Stanley Holloway.

At the start of the 1930s they went to Hollywood, where Edgar – who had dropped his first name for the professional appellation Marriott Edgar – met his half-brother Edgar Wallace.

== Monologues ==
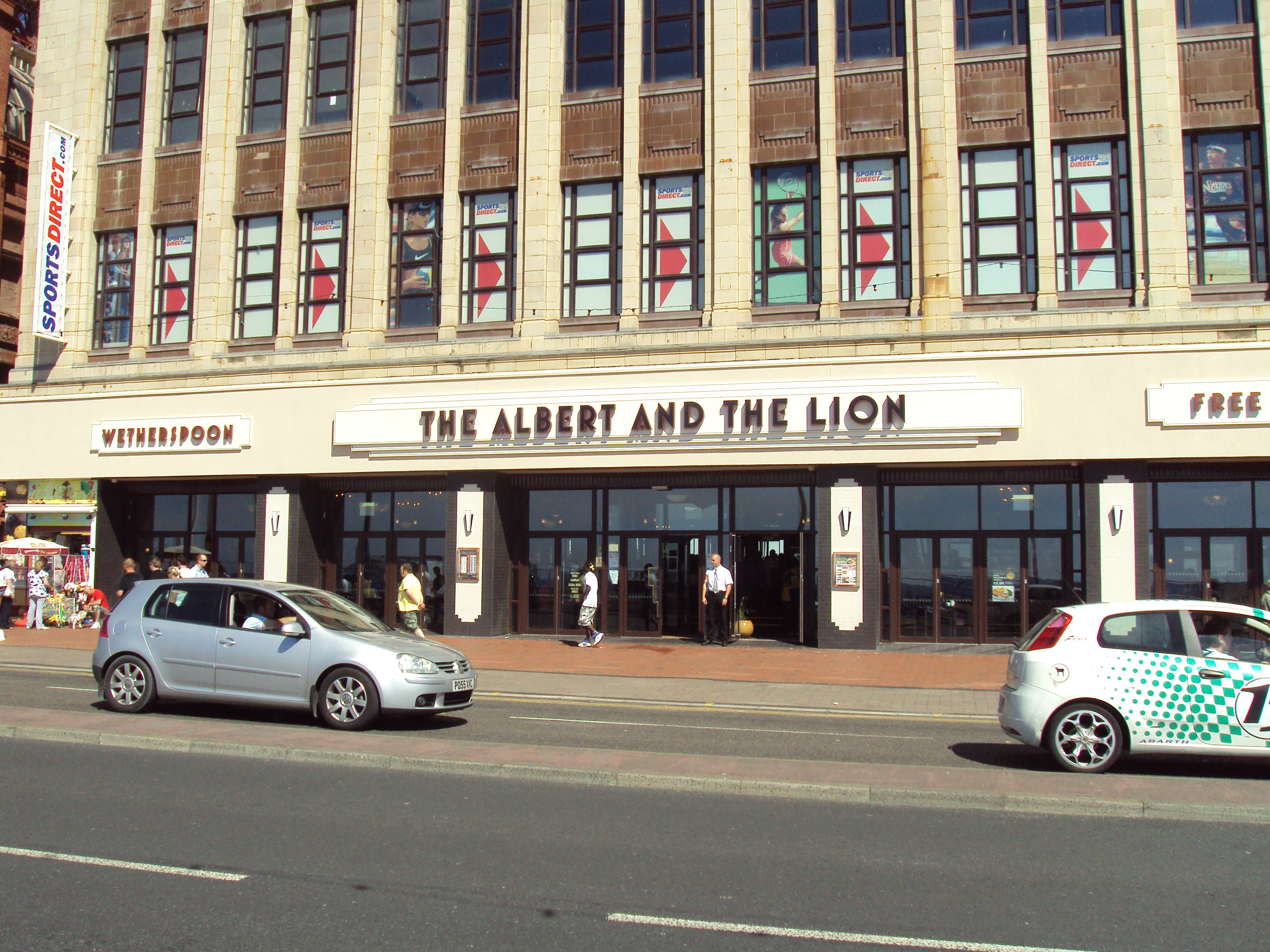
'The Albert and the Lion', a pub on Blackpool Promenade, near the Tower

Holloway was already enjoying some success with the monologue format, with such classics as Sam, Pick Oop Tha' Musket. Edgar asked him if he had heard a story about a couple who had taken their son to the zoo, only to see the lad eaten by a lion. Holloway had indeed heard the story, and shortly afterwards Edgar supplied him with a script. The Lion and Albert became one of Holloway's most popular pieces, one of many he recorded beginning in 1930. The lion of the poem is named "Wallace", which was the name of the first African lion to be bred in Britain, living from 1812 until 1838, and his name became a popular one for lions. The taxidermied remains of Wallace are on display at the Saffron Walden Museum in Essex. Edgar gave the poem the title The Lion and Albert, but some later performances and re-publications used the form Albert and the Lion. A pub on Blackpool Promenade also uses the latter form.

The monologues were designed to be spoken rhythmically with piano accompaniment, which in many cases was also composed by Edgar. The texts were published by Francis, Day & Hunter Ltd. during the 1930s in three collections. All were illustrated by John Hassall, many of whose lively images also became classics. Edgar's compositions were

- Albert 'Arold and Others – performed by Stanley Holloway and Marriott Edgar
  - The Lion and Albert: Albert swallowed by a lion at Blackpool Zoo
  - Runcorn Ferry (Tuppence per Person per Trip), set in Runcorn
  - Three Ha'pence a Foot, featuring an argument with Noah
  - The Battle of Hastings, an account of the Battle of Hastings
  - Marksman Sam, featuring Stanley Holloway's creation Sam Small
  - Albert and the 'Eadsman, set in the Tower of London
  - The Return of Albert (Albert Comes Back), sequel to The Lion and Albert
  - Goalkeeper Joe, set in Wigan
  - Gunner Joe, at the Battle of Trafalgar
  - The Jubilee Sov'rin, the awkward loss of a sovereign commemorating Queen Victoria's Diamond Jubilee
  - The Magna Charter, the signing of Magna Carta
  - Little Aggie, an elephant
- Albert and Balbus and Samuel Small – written and performed by Marriott Edgar
  - The 'Ole in the Ark, a necessary repair to Noah's Ark
  - Sam's Racehorse, an unfortunate purchase
  - George and the Dragon, an unhelpful pub landlady
  - The Recumbent Posture, a linguistic misunderstanding
  - The Channel Swimmer, an attempt on the English Channel
  - Asparagus, a cautionary tale
  - Uppards, a Lancashire version of Longfellow's famous poem Excelsior
  - Joe Ramsbottom, a farmer and the squire
  - Burghers of Calais, retelling the story of the Burghers of Calais
  - Balbus (The Great Wall of China), a fantasy based on the Latin textbook example: "Balbus built a wall"
  - Jonah and the Grampus, the story of Jonah
- Normans and Saxons and Such – some Ancient History
  - Canute the Great 1017–1035, about Cnut the Great
  - William Rufus 1087–1100, about William II of England
  - Queen Matilda 1100–1135, about Empress Matilda
  - The Fair Rosamond 1154–1189, about Rosamund Clifford
  - Richard Cœur-de-Lion 1189–1199, about Richard I of England
  - Henry the Seventh 1485–1509, about Henry VII of England

The Lion and Albert and The Return of Albert have been translated into German under the titles Der Löwe und Albert and Albert kommt wieder, na klar! respectively. The Lion and Albert has been performed as a two-part song of eighteen verses to an Irish folk tune by Kathy Hampson's Free Elastic Band.

In 1991, BBC Radio 4 broadcast a series of eight programmes entitled Marriott's Monologues, with a different monologist in each programme performing Marriott's monologues with piano accompaniment and discussing the monologues. The monologists included Dame Thora Hird, Betty Driver, Les Dawson, Roy Hudd, Kenneth Waller, Peter Goodwright, Bernie Clifton and Roy Castle.

== Film scriptwriting ==
Edgar worked for Gainsborough Pictures between 1936 and 1944, as a scriptwriter for a number of British films (mostly comedies) such as:

- Here's George (1932)
- Rolling Home (1935)
- Windbag the Sailor (1936)
- Oh, Mr Porter! (1937)
- O-Kay for Sound (1937)
- Good Morning, Boys (1937)
- Said O'Reilly to McNab (1937)
- Convict 99 (1938)
- Alf's Button Afloat (1938)
- Old Bones of the River (1938)
- Ask a Policeman (1939)
- The Frozen Limits (1939)
- Charley's (Big-Hearted) Aunt (1940)
- Band Waggon (1940)
- Where's That Fire? (1940)
- The Ghost Train (1941)
- Gasbags (1941)
- Hi Gang! (1941)
- I Thank You (1941)
- Back-Room Boy (1942)
- King Arthur Was a Gentleman (1942)
- Miss London Ltd. (1943)
- Bees in Paradise (1944)

== Lyricist ==
- 1919 'Come Out' for J. C. Williamson appearance as dame in Australian panto 'Sleeping Beauty'

== Marriage and family ==
Edgar married Mildred Williams in Brentford in 1904. They had a son, Hindle (1905–1985), who was an actor.

Edgar died in Battle, East Sussex, on 5 May 1951. He was 70 years old.
