= Mavis Villiers =

Australian actress (1909–1976)

- Press photo 1966
- Born: Mavis Clare Cooney; 10 December 1909; Neutral Bay, Sydney, New South Wales, Australia
- Died: 23 February 1976 (aged 66); Paddington, London, England
- Years active: 1921–1975
- Spouse: Donald Everett Miller (m. 1945; died 1946)

Mavis Villiers (born Mavis Clare Cooney; 10 December 1909 – 23 February 1976) was an Australian-born British actress of stage, film and television. Her parents were John Cooney and Clara Smythe. Her brother, Cecil Cooney, was a camera operator and cinematographer. Her stage name, Villiers, was taken from her maternal grandfather.

== Life and career ==
Mavis emigrated to the United States with her family in 1921, aged 11. The family settled in Hollywood, where her father became a technician at a film company. Both Mavis and her brother Cecil began their careers in the silent era. Much of her activity as a child actress in Hollywood is lost or uncredited; her first accredited film role was as 'the Girl' in a 1927 short comedy, The Bum's Rush, featuring expat Australian star Snub Pollard. Following her parents' divorce, Mavis and her mother Clara migrated to London in 1933. Her brother Cecil followed at some stage; her father remained in California where he died at Ventura in 1960.

Her stage roles included that of Mrs Van Mier in the 1962 London production of Noël Coward's Sail Away at the Savoy Theatre. She was also in the cast of the 1957 West End production of Damn Yankees at the London Coliseum; this production featured Australian actor Bill Kerr as Mr. Applegate. Her sole appearance on the American Broadway stage, was in the role of Aunt Lizzy Sweeney, in the first Broadway production of Brian Friel's Philadelphia Here I Come! at the Helen Hayes Theatre in 1966; she also played the same role in the 1975 film version of that play, her last role before her death.

She had appeared in films from 1927 to 1975. Some of her more prominent film roles were in:The Bum's Rush (1927), Saloon Bar (1940), South American George (1941)One Exciting Night (1944), Suddenly, Last Summer (1959), Victim (1961), and Philadelphia, Here I Come! (1975).

Her television appearances between 1938 and 1972, include roles in various productions, series and episodes. They include the BBC's Sunday Night Theatre, Douglas Fairbanks, Jr., Presents, Educated Evans, The Vise, The Twilight Zone, The Saint, From a Bird's Eye View and Night Gallery.

== Personal life ==
Mavis met her future husband, Captain Donald E. Miller, at the American Eagle Club in Charing Cross Road, London, in 1941. She was working at American Eagle Club at the time. Miller was a Pilot Officer in the American Eagle Squadrons attached to the Royal Air Force. He was subsequently shot down over Germany and taken prisoner for two years until released on VE Day in 1945. The couple were married in London on 16 June 1945 and planned to settle in the United States after Mavis had completed a contractual obligation to appear in a French film, Le Battalion du ciel (1946) (1946).

Before they could be reunited, Donald, now working for Pan-American Airways in San Francisco, died from injuries sustained in a car accident on 4 April 1946, nine months after their marriage. The union was childless; she did not remarry.

Mavis Villiers died from pneumonia at her Paddington flat in 1976, aged 66.

== Selected filmography ==
- Little Lord Fauntleroy (1921) - Little Girl (uncredited)
- Tess of the Storm Country (1922) - Girl in Church (uncredited)
- Old Age Handicap (1928)
- A Lady's Morals (1930) - Selma
- King of the Castle (1936) - Billie
- Double Alibi (1937) - Miss Grant
- It's Never Too Late to Mend (1937) - Betty
- The Nursemaid Who Disappeared (1939)
- An Englishman's Home (1940) - Dolly
- Saloon Bar (1940) - Joan
- Sailors Don't Care (1940) - Blondie
- Gasbags (1941) - American Girl (uncredited)
- South American George (1941) - Mts. Durrant
- Hi Gang! (1941) - Botticelli's Secretary
- Went the Day Well? (1942) - Violet (uncredited)
- One Exciting Night (1944) - Mabel
- Corridor of Mirrors (1948) - Babs
- I Was a Male War Bride (1949) - Dependents' Hotel Reception Clerk (uncredited)
- Pool of London (1951) - Drinking Club Blonde (uncredited)
- Cheer the Brave (1951)
- I Believe in You (1952) - Prostitute (uncredited)
- Time Is My Enemy (1954) - Gladys
- The Mouse That Roared (1959) - Telephone Operator (uncredited)
- Suddenly, Last Summer (1959) - Miss Foxhill
- A Touch of Larceny (1959) - Adele Parrish
- Victim (1960) - Madge
- The Roman Spring of Mrs. Stone (1961) - Mrs. Coogan
- The Boys (1962) - Celia Barker
- The Haunting (1963) - Landlady (uncredited)
- Promise Her Anything (1966) - Rusty's Mother
- Straight On till Morning (1972) - Indian Princess
- Baxter! (1973) - Woman in Aircraft
- No Sex Please, We're British (1973) - American Lady
- Philadelphia, Here I Come! (1975) - Liz Sweeney (final film role)
