= Skylarks =

- Contemporary advertisement
- Directed by: Thornton Freeland
- Written by: Russell G. Medcraft
- Produced by: John W. Gossage
- Starring: Jimmy Nervo; Teddy Knox; Nancy Burne
- Music by: Percival Mackey
- Production company: Reunion Films
- Distributed by: British Lion
- Release date: December 1936
- Running time: 74 minutes
- Country: United Kingdom
- Language: English

Skylarks is a 1936 British comedy film directed by Thornton Freeland and starring Jimmy Nervo, Teddy Knox and Nancy Burne. It was written by Russell G. Medcroft.

== Preservation status ==
It is a partially lost film, with only a short soundless fragment surviving.

== Plot ==
Jimmy Doakes and Teddy Cook join the "Caledonian Air Force". Reporting for flying training, each mistakenly believes the other to be the qualified instructor. They soon discover that neither of them knows what to do and, afraid to land, inadvertently set the record for the longest time in the air.

== Cast ==
- Jimmy Nervo as Jimmy Doakes
- Teddy Knox as Teddy Cook
- Nancy Burne as Marion Hicks
- Queenie Leonard as Maggie Hicks
- Eddie Gray
- Mervyn Blake
- Amy Veness

== Reception ==
Kine Weekly wrote: "Artless aerial comedy extravaganza, featuring two popular music-hall favourites in Nervo and Knox. The sccond half is infinitely better than the first, for the culminating flying stunts are really funny, whereas the setting of the stage for crazy, spectacular fooling is weak, but on balance the film just comes out on the right side. It is a reliable laughter-maker for the not too sophisticated masses, with the quota ticket and star values as useful booking adjuncts. ... Nancy Burne and Queenie Leonard are fair as Marion and Maggie respectively, but the supporting cast is definitely third-rate."

The Daily Film Renter wrote: "Comedy with Nervo and Knox as air force "rookies," who accidentally take up 'plane and break world's endurance flight record, for simple reason they cannot come down! Closing reels pack plenty of serio-comic thrill, atoning for somewhat protracted opening sequences and slender calibre of plot. Co-stars put over familiar antics, extracting fair quota of fun from proceedings. Realistic crashes and airdrome locations. Passable support for the masses."
