= Highland Fling (film) =

1936 British film by Manning Haynes

- Naughton and Gold in the film
- Directed by: Manning Haynes
- Written by: Alan D'Egville; Ralph Stock
- Produced by: John Findlay
- Starring: Charlie Naughton; Jimmy Gold; Frederick Bradshaw; Evelyn Foster
- Cinematography: Stanley Grant
- Production company: Fox Film Company
- Distributed by: Fox Film Company
- Release date: June 1936
- Running time: 68 minutes
- Country: United Kingdom
- Language: English

Highland Fling is a 1936 British comedy film directed by Manning Haynes and starring Charlie Naughton, Jimmy Gold and Frederick Bradshaw. It was written by Alan D'Egville and Ralph Stock, and was made as a quota quickie by the British subsidiary of 20th Century Fox at Wembley Studios. Two incompetent detectives search for a missing document at the Highland Games.

== Plot ==
Incompetent private investigators Smith and Smythe travel to a Scottish castle to track down a missing will. Without the will, an innocent young woman stands to lose her inheritance to her uncle, who benefits under an earlier will. Meanwhile, a crooked clairvoyant tries to claim the estate for himself. After chaotic misadventures, Smith and Smythe manage to expose the fraudster at the eleventh hour and successfully recover the will.

== Cast ==
- Charlie Naughton as Smith
- Jimmy Gold as Smythe
- Frederick Bradshaw as Tony
- Evelyn Foster as Jean
- Gibson Gowland as Delphos
- Naomi Plaskitt as Katherine
- Peter Popp as clockmender
- Bill Shine as Lizards

== Reception ==
The Monthly Film Bulletin wrote: "Taken as fooling, the film is successfully amusing. The plot is sufficient to enable Naughton and Gold to reach the castle and once there the fun begins. Some episodes are music-hall turns transferred to the screen, and much of the dialogue is reminiscent of music-hall patter. Naughton and Gold have a good supporting cast."

Kine Weekly wrote: "Crazy comedy burlesque, in which a string ot popular music-hall sketches are worked into a laughter-provoking entity by the boisterous fooling of Naughton and Gold. The type of humour exhibited is not, of course, designed for exacting audiences, but for those who can still find merri-ment in the knockabout, and there are many, the film represents a miniature riot."

Picture Show wrote: "Amusing, without being riotous."
