= Marcel Varnel =

French film director (1892–1947)

- Born: Marcel Hyacinthe le Bozec; 16 October 1892; Paris, France
- Died: 13 July 1947 (aged 54); Rake, West Sussex, England
- Occupation: Film director

Marcel Varnel (16 October 1892 – 13 July 1947) was a French film director, notable for his career in the United States and England as a director of plays and films.

== Biography ==
He was born Marcel Hyacinthe le Bozec in Paris, France.

Varnel started his working life on the Paris stage, soon becoming a director of musical comedies. In 1925, he moved to New York City, working as director in several Broadway operettas, musicals and dramas for the Shubert family. This was followed by a move to Hollywood, where he directed three low budget thrillers.

In 1934, he moved to England and it was as a director of British comedies – initially working at British International Pictures, Elstree, then moving in 1936 to Gainsborough Pictures – where he produced his best films. Among the performers he worked with were Will Hay, The Crazy Gang, Arthur Askey and George Formby.

He died on 13 July 1947 in a car crash near Rake, West Sussex.

== Films ==
- The Silent Witness (1932) (U.S.A.) – Director
- Chandu the Magician (1932) (U.S.A.) – Director
- Infernal Machine (1933) (U.S.A.) – Director
- Freedom Of The Seas (1934) – Director
- Girls Will Be Boys (1934) – Director
- I Give My Heart (1935) – Director
- Dance Band (1935) – Director
- Royal Cavalcade also known as Regal Cavalcade in the U.S.A. (1935) – Director
- No Monkey Business (1936) – Director
- Public Nuisance No. 1 (1936) – Director
- All In (1936) – Director
- Okay For Sound (1936) – Director
- Good Morning, Boys (1937) – Director
- Oh, Mr Porter! (1937) – Director
- Convict 99 (1938) – Director
- Hey! Hey! USA! (1938) – Director
- The Loves of Madame Dubarry (1938) – Director
- Old Bones of the River (1938) – Director
- Alf's Button Afloat (1938) – Director
- Ask a Policeman (1939) – Director
- Where's That Fire? (1939) – Director
- The Frozen Limits (1939) – Director
- Band Waggon (1940) – Director
- Let George Do It! (1940) – Director
- Gasbags (1940) – Director
- The Ghost of St Michaels (1941) – Director
- Turned Out Nice Again (1941) – Director
- Hi, Gang! (1941) – Director
- South American George (1941) – Director and Producer
- I Thank You (1941) – Director
- Neutral Port (1941) – Director
- King Arthur Was a Gentleman (1942) – Director
- Much Too Shy (1942) – Director
- Get Cracking (1943) – Director
- Bell Bottom George (1943) – Director
- He Snoops to Conquer (1944) – Director and Producer
- I Didn't Do It (1945) – Director and Producer
- George in Civvy Street (1946) – Director and Producer
- This Man Is Mine (1946) – Director and Producer
