= Evelyn Dall =

American actress (1918–2010)

- Born: Evelyn Mildred Fuss; 8 January 1918; The Bronx, New York City, U.S.
- Died: 10 March 2010 (aged 92); Phoenix, Arizona, U.S.
- Occupations: Actress; Singer

Evelyn Dall (born Evelyn Mildred Fuss; January 8, 1918 – March 10, 2010) was an American singer and actress.

== Career ==
Born in The Bronx, New York City, as Evelyn Mildred Fuss, she took her stage name from the surname of two grandchildren of President Franklin D Roosevelt. Dall began her career in short films and in supporting roles on Broadway. In 1935, she was invited to become the female vocalist for Bert Ambrose and his Orchestra, in the UK, where she remained until 1946. She was known there as Britain's "Original Blonde Bombshell".

In 1946, she returned to the United States where she married and raised a daughter and son. Widowed in 1974, Dall moved to Jupiter, Florida, in 1980, then to Arizona in 2002.

== Musical films ==
- 1936 Soft Lights and Sweet Music
- 1937 Calling All Stars
- 1937 Sing as You Swing
- 1938 Kicking the Moon Around
- 1941 He Found a Star
- 1942 King Arthur Was a Gentleman
- 1943 Miss London Ltd.
- 1944 Time Flies

== Theater musicals ==
- 1935 Parade (Broadway)
- 1940 Present Arms (London)
- 1944 Something for the Boys (London)
- 1945 Follow the Girls (London) production

== Death ==
Dall died on March 10, 2010, in Phoenix, Arizona, after an extended illness, aged 92.
