= Crazy Gang (comedy group) =

British comedy troupe

The Crazy Gang (l. to r.) Charlie Naughton, Teddy Knox, Bud Flanagan, Jimmy Nervo, Jimmy Gold and Chesney Allen

The Crazy Gang were a group of British entertainers, formed in the early 1930s. In the mature form the group's six men were Bud Flanagan, Chesney Allen, Jimmy Nervo, Teddy Knox, Charlie Naughton and Jimmy Gold. The group achieved considerable domestic popularity and were a favourite of the royal family, especially King George VI.

== Formation ==
Although George Black is often credited with the formation of the Crazy Gang, the start was more complicated. In 1931, three double acts (Nervo and Knox, Naughton and Gold and Billy Caryll and Hilda Mundy) were tentatively booked at the London Palladium. This caused Black to consider cancelling one of the couples. Nervo and Knox had a technique of entering other acts, and Black was persuaded to overcome the difficulty by letting this happen. The show, which was called Crazy Week opened on 30 November 1931. Other Crazy Weeks followed with Flanagan and Allen added. The name Crazy Gang was introduced in a show called The Big Crazy Gang at the London Palladium and on tour in 1933.

== Composition ==
The members of the Crazy Gang were: Bud Flanagan, Chesney Allen, Jimmy Nervo, Teddy Knox, Charlie Naughton and Jimmy Gold and sometimes 'Monsewer' Eddie Gray. Essentially the gang comprised three double acts; Flanagan and Allen, Naughton and Gold, and Nervo and Knox (with some input from Gray). They had all had entertainment success before the Crazy Gang but not of the same magnitude. It was natural for them to get together as they shared a similar style of comedy and worked on the same bills at theatres.

== Career ==
The gang appeared first in their own stage show Crazy Week at the London Palladium, which later became their adopted home. In 1938 they appeared at the Palladium in the hit revue These Foolish Things alongside the Sherman Fisher Girls.

After being signed by Gainsborough Pictures, they then made several films under Ted Black. The first was O-Kay for Sound (1937), and the best remembered was their war-time film Gasbags (1940). They kept people entertained during the war years with their irreverent comedy style, and Flanagan and Allen's songs also contributed to their success. All their films were directed by Marcel Varnel, the Frenchman who also directed films starring Will Hay, George Formby and others. Moore Marriott, who was a frequent co-star of Will Hay, often turned up in their films. Eddie Gray, their associate and equally crazy comic, appeared in the later Life Is a Circus only.

In Life Is a Circus (1958), starring Shirley Eaton, Flanagan and Allen again performed their biggest hit, "Underneath the Arches". Chesney Allen withdrew from live performances in later years due to ill health, though he outlived all the others. The Gang made a television series, The Gang Show, in 1956. The Gang was understudied by Peter Glaze.

Among the other acts who worked with The Crazy Gang was the tall and rotund American percussionist Teddy Brown. His speciality was to perform on the xylophone. He also served as the butt of practical jokes by the Gang; at one performance Flanagan and Allen took to the stage each encased in one leg of Brown's trousers while Brown frantically called from the wings trying to get them back. His relationship to the main members was similar to that of Eddie Gray. Another star who worked with the gang was the actor Stanley Holloway, who often stood in for Bud Flanagan when he took time off for contractual reasons.

The group were asked to do many Royal Command Performances – their last was in 1961 – and they also did private performances for the royal family. Perhaps the best remembered of their gags is when an attractive girl in a grass skirt is followed across stage by Bud Flanagan wheeling a lawnmower.

== Stage shows ==
- Life begins at Oxford Circus – a revue at the London Palladium (1935)
- Round About Regent Street – a revue at the London Palladium (1935)
- All Alight at Oxford Circus – a revue at the London Palladium (1935)
- Okay for Sound – at the London Palladium (1936)
- London Rhapsody – at the London Palladium (1937)
- These Foolish Things – at the London Palladium (1938)
- The Little Dog Laughed – at the London Palladium (1939)
- Together Again – at the Victoria Palace (1947)
- Knights of Madness – at the Victoria Palace (1950)
- Ring out the Bells – at the Victoria Palace (1952)
- Jokers Wild – at the Victoria Palace (1954)
- These Foolish Kings – at the Victoria Palace (1956)
- Clown Jewels – at the Victoria Palace (1959)
- Young in Heart – at the Victoria Palace (1960)

Note:

- Chesney Allen did not regularly perform with the Gang after 1945, with the exception of Royal Variety Performances, and Eddie Gray rejoined the group in 1956.

== Films ==
- O-Kay for Sound (1937)
- Alf's Button Afloat (1938)
- The Frozen Limits (1939)
- Gasbags (1941)
- Life Is a Circus (filmed 1958, released 1960)

== In popular culture ==
The 1957 film Hell Drivers features a poster for The Crazy Gang in the cafe scenes.

== Legacy ==
The story and music of the Crazy Gang were featured in the 1981 musical Underneath the Arches, written by Brian Glanville, Patrick Garland and Roy Hudd, first performed at the Chichester Festival Theatre and later at the West End's Prince of Wales Theatre.
