= Naughton and Gold =

Comedy double act, consisting of Charlie Naughton and Jimmy Gold

Naughton and Gold were a comedy double act, consisting of Charlie Naughton and Jimmy Gold.

They started in the British Music Halls in 1908, and were still together as part of The Crazy Gang in 1962, becoming the longest period of two British comedians being in the same act. Both had Scottish accents and their act was fast but rather basic comedy.

Charlie Naughton, who was the bald one, was the butt of most of the physical comedy of the Crazy Gang.
