= Nervo and Knox =

English double-act comedians (active c.1905–1962)

Jimmy Nervo
- Born: James Henry Holloway; 2 January 1897; Dalston, London, England
- Died: 5 December 1975 (aged 78); London
- Occupation: Comedian
- Years active: c.1905–1962

Teddy Knox
- Born: Albert Edward Cromwell Knox; 12 July 1896; Gateshead, County Durham, England
- Died: 1 December 1974 (aged 78); Salcombe, Devon
- Occupation: Comedian
- Years active: c.1905–1962

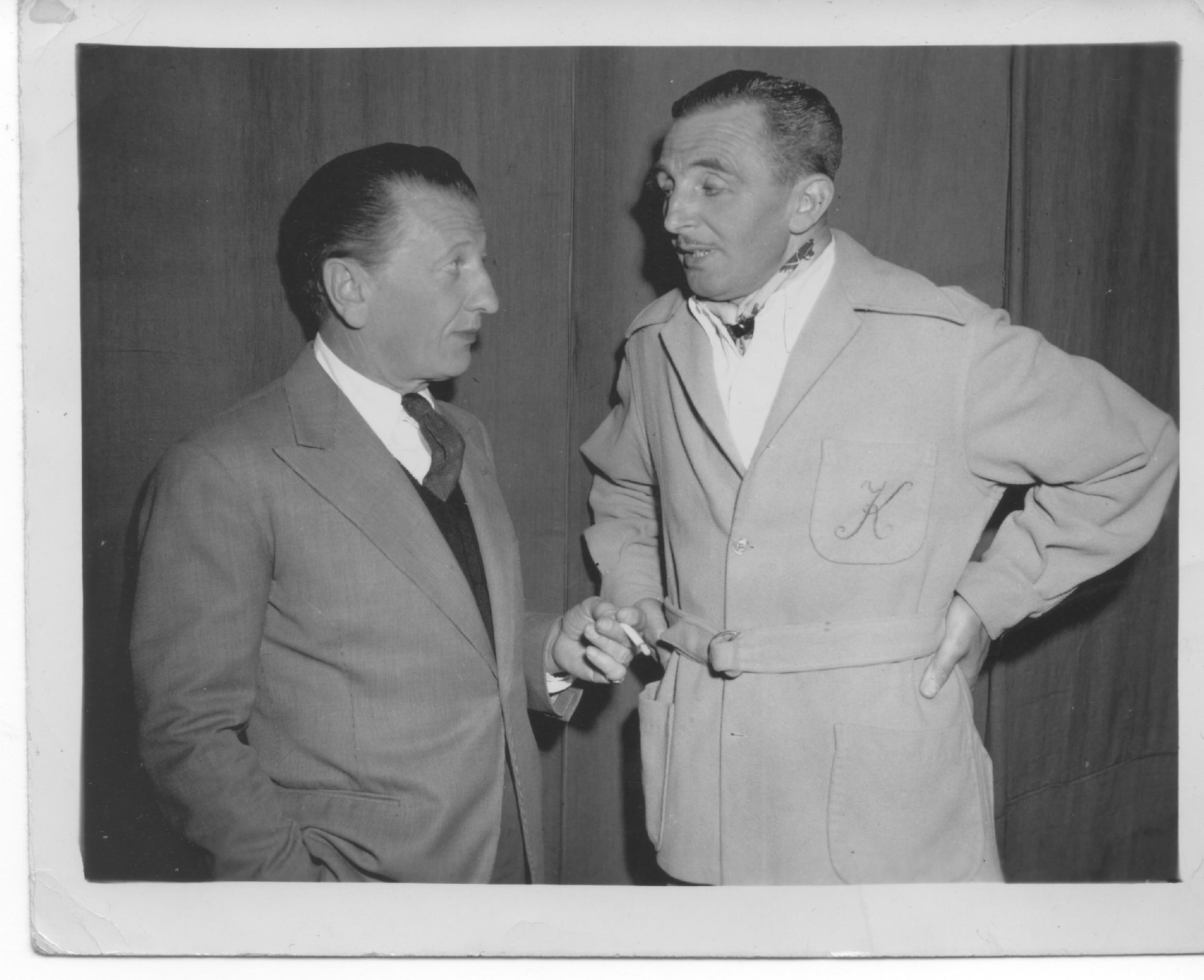
Nervo and Knox

Jimmy Nervo (born James Henry Holloway; 2 January 1897 – 5 December 1975) and Teddy Knox (born Albert Edward Cromwell Knox; 12 July 1896 – 1 December 1974) were English comedians who formed a double act and were part of the original Crazy Gang comedy group.

== Early lives ==
Teddy Knox was born in Gateshead in 1896. According to some sources he started as a juggler, billed as "Chinko the Boy Juggler" (a name devised in tribute to Paul Cinquevalli), though other sources indicate that the name referred to his older brother, Thomas Cromwell Knox (1880–1943). Another brother, William Cromwell Knox (1888–1982) was also a juggler. The brothers worked together as "The Cromwells". Teddy Knox then served in the military in the First World War.

Jimmy Holloway was born in Dalston, London, in 1897. His father, Captain George Holloway (1868–1952), and other family members, were circus owners, as the Holloway Brothers. As a child, Jimmy started performing with his family as an acrobat and high wire performer, and was nicknamed Nervo after a cartoon character. He joined Fred Karno's travelling troupe, and became a solo act performing acrobatic dances.

== Nervo and Knox ==
Nervo and Knox formed a double act together in 1919. They performed as acrobats and knockabout comedians in revues for Albert de Courville, and in 1923 presented "Fantastic Frolics" on an all-British bill at the Palace Theatre on Broadway in New York. Later, they performed in the Ziegfeld Follies.

After returning to England, they toured with their own revue, Young Bloods of Variety, in which several variety acts got caught up in each others' business. They were seen in Nottingham by Val Parnell, who decided to use a similar format in his 1931 shows at the London Palladium. Initially, Nervo and Knox performed alongside Naughton and Gold, and Caryll and Mundy. In turn, this led to the formation of the "Crazy Gang", with Caryll and Mundy replaced by Flanagan and Allen.

The duo performed as female impersonators, and Knox was renowned for being able to speak expressive gibberish at length. They also developed wrestling in slow motion as an integral part of their act. Although Flanagan and Allen are in hindsight the best-remembered of the Crazy Gang members, it was Nervo and Knox who "always had the number one dressing room".

The Crazy Gang appeared at the London Palladium regularly between 1932 and 1940, and at the Victoria Palace between 1947 and 1962. Nervo and Knox also continued to perform in revues and pantomimes.

== Personal lives and deaths ==
Teddy Knox married Clarice Dulley in 1934, and remarried after her death in 1966. He died at home in Salcombe, Devon, in 1974 at the age of 78. Jimmy "Nervo" Holloway married Minnie Schimmler in 1939; she had performed as Minna Scott with the D'Oyly Carte Opera Company. He died in London in 1975, also aged 78.

== Selected filmography ==
- Nervo and Knox (1926) short film made in the sound-on-film process Phonofilm, released December 1926
- Alf's Button (1930)
- Skylarks (1936)
- It's in the Bag (1936)
- O-Kay for Sound (1937)
- Alf's Button Afloat (1938)
- Life Is a Circus (1960)
