= Charlie Naughton =

Scottish comedian (1886–1976)

- Born: Charles John Naughton; 21 April 1886; Glasgow, Scotland
- Died: 11 February 1976 (aged 89); London, England
- Occupations: Actor, comedian
- Known for: The Crazy Gang

Charles John Naughton (21 April 1886 – 11 February 1976) was a Scottish comedian.

Naughton was born in Glasgow. He was a member of The Crazy Gang, and part of a double act, Naughton and Gold with fellow Glaswegian Jimmy Gold. In 1955, he starred in the first Guinness television commercial, playing the zoo-keeper with a German seal. He died in London.

In 1953 he was sued by chorus girl, Ima Cecily Hanson after she claimed he deliberately tripped her for a joke, while she was leaving the stage during a show, which resulted in her being rendered unconscious.

His daughter, Alice Elizabeth Naughton married a Canadian, Richard Harvey Stapleford. Their daughter, Naughton's granddaughter, Sally-Anne Stapleford is a five-time British champion and two time Olympian in figure skating in the ladies event and won the silver medal at the 1965 European Figure Skating Championships.

== Selected filmography ==
- My Lucky Star (1933)
- Highland Fling (1936)
- Wise Guys (1937)
- O-Kay for Sound (1937)
- Alf's Button Afloat (1938)
