= Jimmy Gold =

Scottish comedian (1886–1967)

Jimmy McGonigal (21 April 1886 – 7 October 1967), known professionally as Jimmy Gold, was a Scottish comedian and part of the music hall act of Naughton and Gold. Later they became part of the Crazy Gang.

Gold was born in Glasgow. His parents were John McGonigal, a painter and decorator, and Elizabeth (whose maiden name was Gold). He had either four or five brothers and three sisters. Harry was the oldest and Jimmy was second oldest. Others included Danny, Johnny and Peter (the youngest). The sisters were Elizabeth, Agnes and another one who died when just a few years old. He is remembered as a happy, good natured man.

Jimmy went into the family trade of painting and decorating till he joined up with Naughton. They were tap dancers to start with but the comedy gradually took over.

As part of the Crazy Gang, he, and they, held the record for the number of appearances at the Royal Variety Show in front of the Queen. The Crazy Gang were favourites of the young Princess Margaret.

Once, when playing the Palladium, he noticed his bottle of whisky had less in it than it had when he went out on stage. He blamed his younger brother Peter McGonigal for drinking it. Peter denied it. Jimmy asked him if he saw anyone else backstage whilst he was on stage. Peter described a man he had seen backstage during the performance. The description fitted His Royal Highness, Edward the Duke of Windsor, who was in attendance.

Another time, when the Crazy Gang were travelling by road and when there were rumours that Jimmy was going to be dropped by them, he told the rest of them "I don't care. I've got 40 grand in the bank". A little while later in the conversation he said "I don't care. I've got 30 grand in the bank". At which one of the other members of the Crazy Gang stopped the car. "What are you doing?" said Jimmy. "I'm going back", said the driver. "Somewhere between here and the last petrol station you lost 10 grand and I'm going back to look for it".

He died in London, aged 81.

== Filmography ==
- My Lucky Star (1933)
- Highland Fling (1936)
- Wise Guys (1937)
- O-Kay for Sound (1937)
- Alf's Button Afloat (1938)
- Life Is a Circus (1960)
