= Chesney Allen =

English entertainer (1894–1982)

- Chesney Allen in 1938.
- Born: William Ernest Chesney Allen; 5 April 1894; Battersea, London
- Died: 13 November 1982 (aged 88); Easebourne, West Sussex
- Occupations: Entertainer; music hall performer; comedian; actor
- Years active: 1912-1982
- Spouse: Aleta Cosette Turner (m. 1926)

William Ernest Chesney Allen (5 April 1894 – 13 November 1982) was a popular English entertainer of the Second World War period. He is best remembered for his comedy and music double act with Bud Flanagan as duo Flanagan and Allen.

== Life and career ==
Allen was born in Battersea, London, in 1894, married Aleta Cosette Turner in Leeds in 1926 and died in Easebourne, West Sussex, in 1982. Aleta died in a nursing home in Midhurst on 12 August 1986.

He began his career in straight acting, making his debut in stock at the Wimbledon Theatre, London, in 1912. Serving in Flanders in the First World War, he made friends with Bud Flanagan, but they did not work together until 1926, touring with a Florrie Forde show called "Here's to You". As music hall comedians they would often feature a mixture of comedy and music in their act and this led to a successful recording career and roles in film and television. Flanagan and Allen were also members of the Crazy Gang and worked together in that team for many years.

Flanagan and Allen's songs featured the same, usually gentle humour for which the duo were known in their live performances, and during the war reflected the experiences of ordinary people during wartime. Songs like "We're Going to Hang Out the Washing on the Siegfried Line" mocked the German defences (Siegfried Line), while others like "Miss You" sang of missing one's sweetheart during enforced absences. Other songs such as their best-known "Underneath the Arches" (which Flanagan co-wrote with Reg Connelly) had universal themes such as friendship, which, again, helped people relate to the subject matter. The music was usually melodic, following a binary verse–verse–chorus structure, with a small dance band or orchestra providing the backing. The vocals were distinctive because, while Flanagan was at least a competent singer and sang the melody lines, Allen used an almost spoken delivery to provide the harmonies.

Flanagan and Allen stopped performing together with Chesney Allen's announcement of his retirement on health grounds (particularly arthritis) at the end of 1945, following the penultimate season of the Crazy Gang's show at the Victoria Palace Theatre in London (his place for the final season was taken by 'Monsewer' Eddie Gray), although he continued working in theatrical management and returned to make occasional guest appearances. His last recording was for the album of the stage show Underneath the Arches in 1982.

Chesney Hawkes is named after Chesney Allen, and a slight (permissible) dent in the slate of a snooker table is known as a "chesney" or "Chesney Allen".

== Selected filmography ==
- Wild Boy (1934)
- O-Kay for Sound (1937)
- Alf's Button Afloat (1938)
- We'll Smile Again (1942)
- Theatre Royal (1943)
- Dreaming (1944)
- Here Comes the Sun (1946)
- Dunkirk (1958)
- Life Is a Circus (1960)
