= Bud Flanagan =

British music hall entertainer (1896–1968)

Bud Flanagan OBE
- Flanagan in a BBC publicity photograph from 1943
- Born: Chaim Reuben Weintrop; 14 October 1896; Whitechapel, London, England
- Died: 20 October 1968 (aged 72); Kingston, London, England
- Resting place: Golders Green Crematorium, London, England
- Other names: Robert Winthrop
- Occupations: Music hall entertainer, comedian, television and film actor
- Known for: Music hall comedy double act
- Spouse: Ann Quinn (m. 1925)
- Children: 1

Bud Flanagan (born Chaim Reuben Weintrop, 14 October 1896 – 20 October 1968) was a British music hall and vaudeville entertainer and comedian, and later a television and film actor. He was best known as being one half of the comedy and music act Flanagan and Allen with his partner Chesney Allen. Flanagan was famous as a wartime entertainer and his achievements were recognised when he was appointed an Officer of the Order of the British Empire (OBE) in 1959.

== Family background ==
Flanagan was born in Whitechapel, in the East End of London. His parents, Wolf Weintrop (1856–1932) and Yetta (Kitty) Weintrop (1856–1935) were Polish Jews who were married in the city of Radom, Poland, and fled to Łódź on their wedding day to avoid a pogrom. Wolf and Yetta Weintrop intended to escape to the "New World" from Eastern Europe – they paid for a ticket to New York, but a dishonest ticket agent gave them a ticket to London.

In London, Wolf learned to be a shoe and bootmaker, earning extra money singing as a part-time cantor (Hazzan) and by singing in pubs on Saturday nights. Wolf and Yetta Weintrop had ten children, all born in London. At the time of the 1881 UK Census, Wolf "Wienkopf" and family lived in Brick Lane, and by the 1891 UK Census, the family had moved on to 12 Hanbury Street, Spitalfields.

== Early life ==
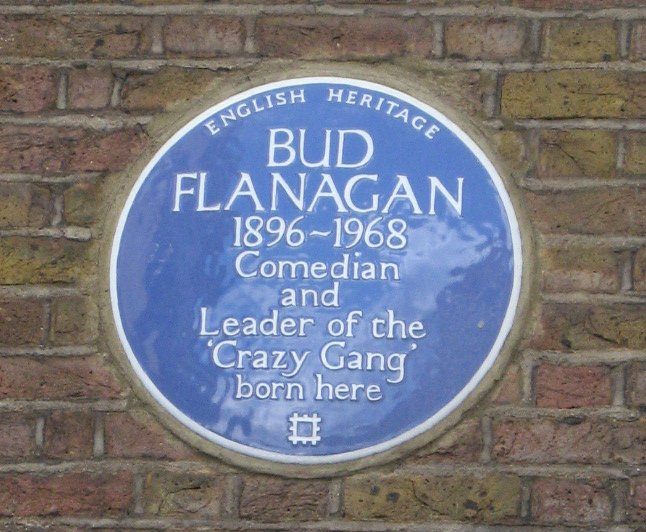
Blue plaque on 12, Hanbury Street where Flanagan was born in 1896

At the time of the 1901 census, the Weintrop family were still at Hanbury Street, with Reuben aged four living with six of his siblings and his parents over a fish and chip shop. They later owned a barber shop and tobacconist in Whitechapel. Weintrop attended school in Petticoat Lane, and by the age of 10 was working as call boy at the Cambridge Music Hall. In 1908, he made his début in a talent contest at the London Music Hall in Shoreditch, performing conjuring tricks as Fargo, the Boy Wizard.

Weintrop was born with a sense of adventure and was keen to see the world. In 1910, aged 14, he decided to leave home and walked all the way to Southampton where he claimed to be an electrician aged 17 to get a job aboard ship. He sailed with the SS Majestic to New York, and jumped ship when it arrived in the US. Reuben got various jobs selling newspapers, delivering telegrams for Western Union, and harvested wheat in Fargo, North Dakota. He joined a vaudeville show that toured across the US, whilst in October 1914, he sailed with a show to perform in New Zealand and Australia. He travelled to perform on stage in South Africa, where he met his brother Alec (Alexander), who was living there at the time.

Once back in San Francisco, Reuben decided to return to the United Kingdom to enlist to fight for Britain in the First World War. He returned to Britain in 1915 and enlisted as "Robert" Weintrop; he joined the Royal Field Artillery, and was sent with his unit to fight in France. In the Army, he worked as a driver and entertained the troops with his singing and impersonations. Here he met the anti-Semitic Sergeant-Major Flanagan, on whom Reuben later had his revenge when he adopted the name "Flanagan" as his stage name. In 1919 he formed a comedy double act, Flanagan and Roy, and they had a "black and white" act. Newspaper reports indicate that Flanagan had gone solo by 1924 and was gaining an increasing audience.

== Showbusiness career ==
Bud Flanagan is best remembered as part of a double act with Chesney Allen, billed as Flanagan and Allen. They had first met on active service in Flanders, but did not work together until 1926, touring with a Florrie Forde show called "Here's to You". They established a reputation and were booked by Val Parnell at the Holborn Empire. As music hall comedians they would often feature a mixture of comedy and music in their act and this led to a successful recording career as a duo and roles in film and television. Flanagan and Allen were both also members of The Crazy Gang, appearing in the first show at the London Palladium in 1931, and continued to work with the group, concurrently with their double-act career.

Flanagan and Allen's songs featured the same, usually gentle humour for which the duo were known in their live performances, and during World War II reflected the experiences of ordinary people during wartime. Songs like "We're Going to Hang out the Washing on the Siegfried Line" mocked the German defences (the Siegfried Line), while others like "Miss You" sang of missing one's sweetheart during enforced absences. Other songs such as their most famous "Underneath the Arches" (which Flanagan co-wrote with Reg Connelly) had universal themes such as friendship, which, again, helped people relate to the subject matter. The music was usually melodic, following a binary verse, verse chorus structure, with a small dance band or orchestra providing the backing. The vocals were distinctive because, while Flanagan was at least a competent singer and sang the melody lines, Allen used an almost spoken delivery to provide the harmonies.

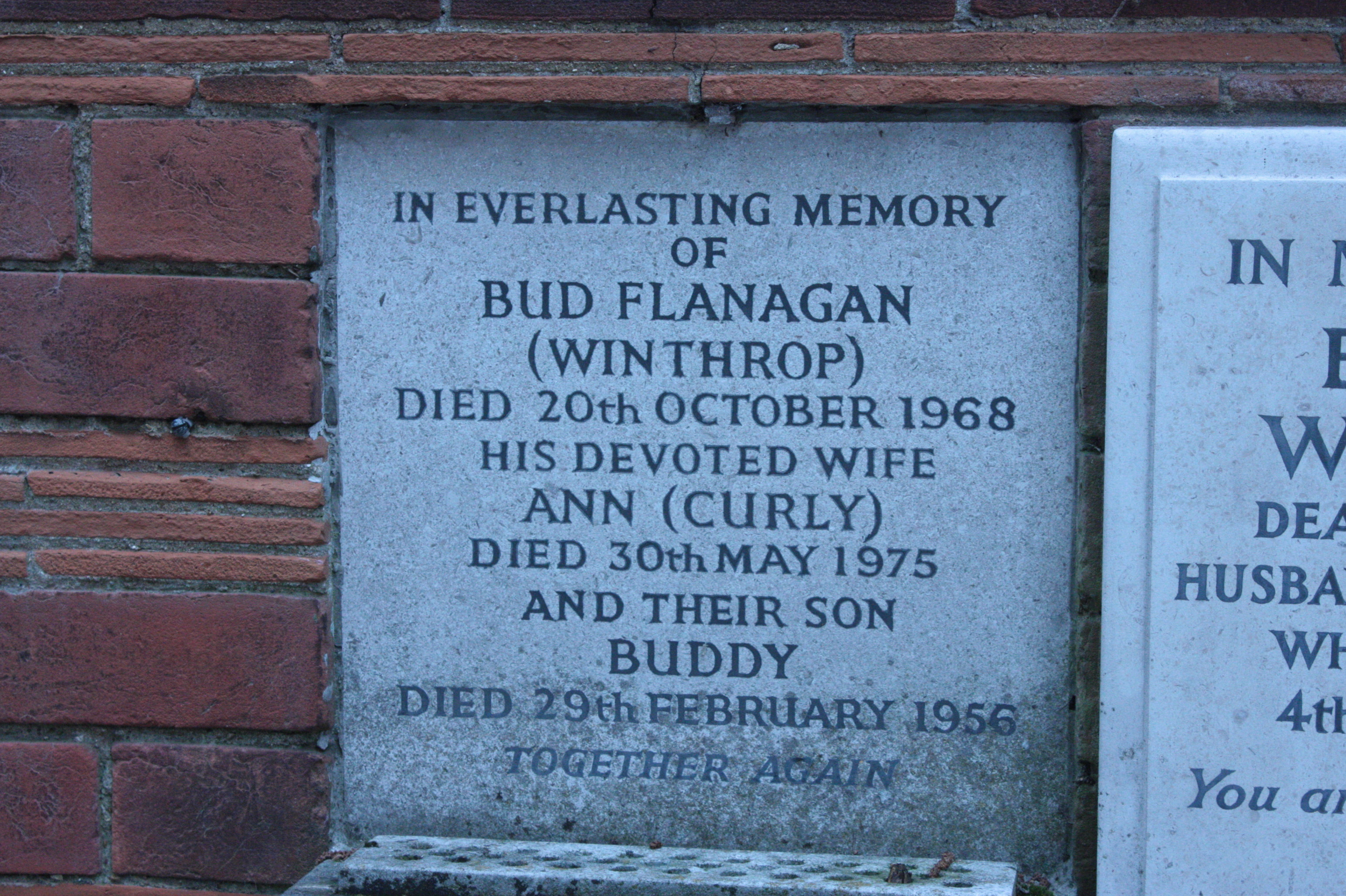
Memorial to Bud Flanagan, Golders Green Crematorium

Allen semi-retired in 1945 and Flanagan increasingly became a solo performer, although the two of them still appeared together on occasion, including for the 1957 TV series Together Again. In 1959, Flanagan was awarded the OBE, and received the award from the Duke of Edinburgh at Buckingham Palace. By the 1960s, and with his career on the wane, Flanagan used his wealth to invest in betting shops. Flanagan was a member of the entertainment charitable fraternity, the Grand Order of Water Rats.

Flanagan's last recording was Jimmy Perry and Derek Taverner's theme for the British sitcom Dad's Army, "Who Do You Think You Are Kidding, Mr Hitler?", recorded by Pye on 27 February 1968, shortly before his death on 20 October 1968, and for which he was paid 100 guineas (£105). The song was an affectionate pastiche of the sort of songs Flanagan had sung during the war.

In tribute, Flanagan's fellow comedian Charlie Chester said, "No artist born was more loved by his brothers. No man gave more in human happiness".

== Personal life ==
He met his wife Anne (known as "Curly"), daughter of Irish comedian Johnny Quinn ("The Singing Clown"), who was a dancer in "Mrs. Stacey's Young Ladies". They married in Chester-le-Street in 1924 and their son Buddy was born in 1926. He went on to become an actor and a night club entertainer. Buddy died of leukaemia in Los Angeles in 1956.

Flanagan died on 20 October 1968. After his death, the estate of Bud Flanagan started a charity to promote cancer research. A primary aim of the Bud Flanagan Leukaemia Fund is to support the Leukaemia/Myeloma Unit at the Royal Marsden Hospital in Sutton, Surrey.

== Sources ==
- Flanagan, Bud (1961) My Crazy Life (Autobiography), F Muller, London
- Chambers, Colin (2002). The Continuum Companion to Twentieth Century Theatre. London: Continuum. ISBN 0-8264-4959-X.
