= R. E. Dearing =

English film editor

- Born: Robert Dearing; 1893; Combs, Suffolk, England, UK
- Died: February 1968 (aged 74–75); Hillingdon, Middlesex, England, UK
- Occupation: Film editor

Robert Dearing, usually credited as R. E. Dearing (1893 — February 1968), was an English film editor. Known affectionately as "Pop" Dearing, he worked on many comedies for Gainsborough Pictures, including many featuring Will Hay, and some of director Carol Reed's early films.

== Partial filmography ==
- Hindle Wakes (1931)
- The Happy Ending (1931)
- No Lady (1931)
- The Man from Toronto (1933)
- Soldiers of the King (1933)
- Wild Boy (1934)
- Things Are Looking Up (1935)
- Windbag the Sailor (1936)
- The Man Who Changed His Mind (1936)
- Everybody Dance (1936)
- Oh, Mr Porter! (1937)
- Doctor Syn (1937)
- O-Kay for Sound (1937)
- Convict 99 (1938)
- Hey! Hey! USA (1938)
- Old Bones of the River (1938)
- The Lady Vanishes (1938)
- Ask a Policeman (1939)
- Shipyard Sally (1939)
- Night Train to Munich (1940)
- Where's That Fire? (1940)
- They Came by Night (1940)
- Cottage to Let (1941)
- Kipps (1941)
- The Young Mr. Pitt (1942)
- Uncensored (1942)
- Millions Like Us (1943)
- We Dive at Dawn (1943)
- The Man in Grey (1943)
- Fanny by Gaslight (1944)
- Time Flies (1944)
- Bees in Paradise (1944)
