= Back-Room Boy =

1942 British film by Herbert Mason

- Opening titles
- Directed by: Herbert Mason
- Screenplay by: Marriott Edgar; Val Guest; J.O.C. Orton
- Story by: J.O.C. Orton
- Produced by: Edward Black
- Starring: Arthur Askey; Moore Marriott; Graham Moffatt
- Cinematography: Jack E. Cox
- Edited by: R. E. Dearing
- Music by: Hans May
- Production company: Gainsborough Pictures
- Distributed by: General Film Distributors
- Release dates: 17 April 1942 (United Kingdom); 10 February 1947 (Sweden)
- Running time: 82 minutes
- Country: United Kingdom
- Languages: English; German

Back-Room Boy is a 1942 British comedy mystery film directed by Herbert Mason and starring Arthur Askey, Googie Withers, Graham Moffatt and Moore Marriott. It was written by J.O.C. Orton, Marriott Edgar and Val Guest, produced by Edward Black for Gainsborough Pictures and distributed by General Film Distributors. It marked the film debut of Vera Frances.

A man from the Met Office is sent to a lighthouse on a remote Scottish island to monitor the weather, where he hopes to escape from women, but soon finds the island overrun by them.

== Plot ==
Meteorologist Arthur Pilbeam's fiancée Betty breaks their engagement because he does not spend enough time with her due to having to attend at the BBC every hour, on the hour, for his vital job of creating the BBC pips. He is so upset, he uses the pips to play "Shave and a Haircut". When he is reprimanded, he tries to resign, but this is refused, but when he says he wants to avoid all women, he is posted to a remote Scottish lighthouse to make weather reports. Before taking a boat from the mainland, he is warned by the locals that he will go mad from the isolation and the curse of a mermaid within a month, as his predecessors have. He still goes to the island, but as soon as he lands he is disturbed as most of his baggage disappears.

Pilbeam realises he is not as isolated as he thought and meets Jane, a young girl who stowed away on the boat that brought him to the island, and then Bobbie, a model and the sole survivor of a torpedoed ship. His radio disappears and Bobbie sees a man tied up in a cupboard, but he also seems to disappear when she shows Pilbeam. Another boatload of women plus some crewmen, arrive from Bobbie's ship. This makes it very crowded in the lighthouse, until people start to mysteriously disappear during the night, leaving an anxious Pilbeam trying to discover what has happened to everyone.

It turns out that Nazi agents have been secretly sweeping the nearby waters of mines and have taken everyone else prisoner. They leave Pilbeam free and force him to send away a rescue party without arousing suspicion. But between Pilbeam, Jane's uncle (from the neighbouring island) and the women, they manage to turn the tables on their captors. They tie the Germans up and set out on the German boat. On the way back to the mainland, however, they come across an enemy warship in the fog. The Germans mistake them for their own spies and order them to guide them through the minefield. Their small boat is able to avoid the mines but the ship strikes a mine and sinks.

Pilbeam returns to London a hero, to find Betty has been given his old job on the pips. Having apparently rebuffed him, she plays "Shave and a Haircut" and he rushes off to see her.

== Cast ==
- Arthur Askey as Arthur Pilbeam
- Moore Marriott as Jerry (Jeremiah Percy Cecil Frobisher)
- Graham Moffatt as Albert
- Googie Withers as Bobbie
- Vera Frances as Jane
- Joyce Howard as Betty
- John Salew as Steve Mason
- George Merritt as uncle
- Aubrey Mallalieu (uncredited) as West
- D. J. Williams (uncredited) as McIntyre

== Production ==
Arthur Askey replaced Will Hay when Hay moved from Gainsborough to Ealing Studios before the Second World War. Filming took place at Gaunt-British Studios, Lime Grove Studios and Shepherd's Bush, London, England. The films sets were designed by the art director Walter Murton.

== Release ==
Back-Room Boy was released to cinemas in the United Kingdom on 17 April 1942.

== Reception ==
The Monthly Film Bulletin wrote: "This irresponsible story was evidently only written to serve as a vehicle for Arthur Askey and he gives all that is expected of him in the shape of wisecracks, madcap chases and so on. Moore Marriott and Graham Moffatt have smallish parts as sailors but they, too, run true to type. Vera Frances, a new child star, is given her chance in this film and makes good use of it; on one or two occasions indeed she steals the limelight from Askey himself."

Kine Weekly wrote: "The opening B.B.C. sequences are good satire, but the humour hangs fire a little during the lighthouse preliminaries. Luckily, Vera Frances makes an effective foil for the star and prevents a serious hiatus."

Critic Robert Murphy described the film as "the funniest if the least original of the Askey comedies".

Leslie Halliwell wrote "Fairly spirited star comedy of interest as a shameless rip-off of The Ghost Train and Oh Mr Porter! whose plotlines are milked but not improved"

David Parkinson in The Radio Times wrote, "The main problem is the film's insistence on hammering home every gag, with Askey particularly at fault. ... There are compensations, however, notably the by-play between Moffatt and Marriott, and the performance of Googie Withers."

== Home media ==
Back-Room Boy was released on DVD on 19 February 2007. The film was also released in the Arthur Askey Collection box set on DVD in 2007 in the United Kingdom, followed by another edition in 2012.

== Bibliography ==
- Mayer, Geoff (2003). Guide to British Cinema. Greenwood Publishing Group.
- Murphy, Robert (1989). Realism and Tinsel: Cinema and Society in Britain, 1939-1949. Routledge.
- Walker, John, ed. (2004). Halliwell's Film Video & DVD Guide (19th ed.). HarperCollins Entertainment.
