= Good Morning, Boys =

Good Morning, Boys!
- Opening titles
- Directed by: Marcel Varnel
- Written by: Val Guest; Leslie Arliss; Marriott Edgar
- Produced by: Edward Black
- Starring: Will Hay; Graham Moffatt
- Cinematography: Arthur Crabtree
- Edited by: R.E. Dearing; Alfred Roome
- Music by: Louis Levy; Jack Beaver
- Production company: Gainsborough Pictures
- Distributed by: Gaumont British Distributors
- Release date: January 1937
- Running time: 79 minutes
- Country: United Kingdom
- Language: English

Good Morning, Boys! (Note: Also known as Where There's a Will, the name of another Hay film from the previous year.) is a 1937 British comedy film directed by Marcel Varnel and featuring Will Hay, Graham Moffatt, Martita Hunt, Lilli Palmer and Peter Gawthorne. It was written by Val Guest, Leslie Arliss and Marriott Edgar, and was made at the Gainsborough Studios in Islington.

== Plot ==
Dr Twist is the roguish headmaster of a dubious boarding school for boys. Twist bets on the horses with his pupils and teaches them little. Colonel Willoughby-Gore attempts to sack the incompetent Twist but is foiled when he and his boys, after fraudulently gaining resounding success in a French examination, are invited to Paris by the French ministry of education.

In Paris they become involved with a gang of criminals, including escaped convict Arty Jones, father of one of the boys, and Yvette, a night club singer, who are attempting to steal the Mona Lisa from the Louvre and replace it with a duplicate.

== Cast ==
- Will Hay as Dr. Benjamin Twist
- Martita Hunt as Lady Bagshott
- Peter Gawthorne as Colonel Willoughby-Gore
- Graham Moffatt as Albert Brown
- Fewlass Llewellyn as The Dean
- Mark Daly as Arty Jones
- Peter Godfrey as Cliquot
- C. Denier Warren as Minister of Education
- Lilli Palmer as Yvette
- Charles Hawtrey as Septimus (uncredited)
- Will Hay Jnr, Basil Mcgrail, Clive Dunn as schoolboys (uncredited)
- The Seven = CherifianTroupe
- Ben Hali/Ali => Mohamed Boussetta and brothers

== Background ==
This was the first film in which Hay collaborated with director Varnel, as well as other key members of his future cinema team, Guest and Edgar as writers, and among technicians Crabtree and Vetchinsky. Varnel imbued the film with "a style now rich, full-blooded, confident".

The comedy involves "savage mocking of our public school system" as well making fun of the British sense of honour and "playing the game". The scenario is developed from Hay's music hall turn 'The Fourth Form at St Michael's' into a "fast, hard-hitting and visual screenplay. Although the audience should dislike Twist because of his behaviour, he gains the sympathy by "his determination to survive in a hostile, efficient world... in his perpetual rearguard action against the forces of authority.

The film marked the first appearance of both Peter Gawthorne and Charles Hawtrey in a Will Hay film, both of whom would go onto act as straight men to Hay in his future films.

== Critical reception ==
The Monthly Film Bulletin wrote: "The pace is swiit, and there is abundance of riotous and hilarious adventures and incidents. The direction on slapstick lines is slick and effective. The dialogue is bright, and the gags good of their kind. Much depends on Will Hay, who is at his best in his own unique fashion. The supporting cast has not a great deal to do, but does it energetically. The settings are varied and lavish. The camera work is noticeably good and effective."

The Daily Film Renter wrote: "Needless to say, the star dominates the action, peering quizzically over his glasses in approved style, while Graham Moffatt as a fat scholar has the next best opportunities. Lilli Palmer infuses a great deal of feminine charm into the somewhat slender role of the French vamp, putting over a saucy song number in the course of the picture; it is quite certain that Hay's following will find this effort greatly to their tastes, as well as all popular patrons."

Picturegoer wrote: "It does not perhaps weigh up to the star's previous efforts such as Where There's a Will and Windbag the Sailor, but it is very good stuff of its kind and illustrates that the star is one of the best screen comedians we have in this country. Marcel Vanel's direction is good and allows for the world's worst schoolmaster to put over the kind of humour that has made him famous on stage and the radio."

Variety wrote: "Good vehicle for the scholastic Vaudeville comedian, Will Hay, with many ludicrous situations, witty dialog and sufficient background in the way of plot. Good chance of registering locally, but the other side of the Atlantic, not appreciating the severe discipline of boys' colleges here, may pot appreciate the burlesque."

BFI Screenonline wrote that Varnel created a memorable set-piece with "Hay's class of schoolboys running amok in a Paris nightclub".
