= Peter Gawthorne =

Irish film actor (1884–1962)

- Born: 1 September 1884; Queen's County, Ireland, UK
- Died: 17 March 1962 (aged 77); London, England
- Years active: 1906–1956

Peter Gawthorne (1 September 1884 – 17 March 1962) was an Anglo-Irish actor, probably best known for his roles in the films of Will Hay and other popular British comedians of the 1930s and 1940s. Gawthorne was one of Britain's most called-upon supporting actors during this period.

== Early life and career ==
He was born in 1884 in Queen's County (now County Laois) in Ireland, but spent most of his career in England. After two years at the Academy of Dramatic Art, Gawthorne began a career on the London stage, eventually running up over twenty years experience there. His debut was in 1906, a walk-on part at His Majesty's Theatre, London. He was featured in the role of Albany Pope, receiving good notices, in the hit musical The Boy in 1917. He also studied singing.

He then toured Australia, South Africa and America, making his film debut in Hollywood before returning to Britain, where he worked for a number of film companies but predominately Gainsborough Studios.

He worked extensively in cinema often playing military officers and stern, authority figures, many of whom frequently clashed with the bumbling idiots played by Will Hay and other well-known comedians such as George Formby, The Crazy Gang, the Aldwych farceurs, Jack Hulbert, Cicely Courtneidge, Old Mother Riley, Tommy Trinder, Arthur Askey and Richard Murdoch.

His appearances were prolific and not just confined to comedies, taking in such films as The Iron Duke (1934), Goodbye, Mr. Chips (1939), "Pimpernel" Smith (1941), Love on the Dole (1941), and The Young Mr. Pitt (1942).

== Financial problems ==
In January 1924 bankruptcy proceedings in England revealed that Gawthorne had liabilities of approximately £10,000 (including £2,000 owed to his wife), most of which resulted from losses related to production of the Island King. Following the closing of that play he had performed in Katinka, earning £30 per week, with part of that amount going to his solicitors to apply to his debts. A trustee was appointed to handle Gawthorne's estate.

== Filmography ==
=== Film ===
- Behind That Curtain (1929) as British Police Inspector
- His Glorious Night (1929) as General Ettingen
- One Hysterical Night (1929) as Mr. Bixby
- Sunnyside Up (1929) as Lake the Butler
- Temple Tower (1930) as Matthews
- Those Three French Girls (1930) as Parker
- The Man Who Came Back (1931) as Griggs
- Charlie Chan Carries On (1931) as Inspector Duff
- I Like Your Nerve (1931) as Roberts - Lattimer's Butler
- COD (1932) as Detective
- His Lordship (1932) as Ferguson, the Butler
- Jack's the Boy (1932) as Mr. Brown
- The Lodger (1932) as Lord Southcliff
- The Flag Lieutenant (1932) as Maj. Thesiger
- Perfect Understanding (1933) as Butler
- The Blarney Stone (1933) as Unknown role
- Prince of Arcadia (1933) as Equerry
- Leave It to Smith (1933) as Rolls
- The House of Trent (1933) as Lord Fairdown
- Grand Prix (1934) as John McIntyre
- Two Hearts in Waltz Time (1934) as Mr. Joseph
- Mr Stringfellow Says No (1934) as Prime Minister
- Something Always Happens (1934) as Mr. Hatch
- Girls, Please! (1934) as Van Hoffenheim
- Money Mad (1934) as Sir John Leyland
- The Camels Are Coming (1934) as Colonel Fairley
- My Old Dutch (1934) as Mr. Paraday
- The Iron Duke (1934) as Duke of Richmond
- Dirty Work (1934) as Inspector Barlow
- Murder at Monte Carlo (1935) as Duprez
- Who's Your Father (1935) as Capt. Medway
- The Divine Spark (1935) as Felice Romani
- Man of the Moment (1935) as Staff Colonel
- Boys Will Be Boys (1935) as Minor Role
- The Crouching Beast (1935) as Kadir Pasha
- Stormy Weather (1935) as Police Inspector
- Me and Marlborough (1935) as Mr. Barton
- Crime Unlimited (1935) as Newall
- No Limit (1935) as Mr. Higgins
- Wolf's Clothing (1936) as Sir Hector
- Pot Luck (1936) as Chief Constable
- A Woman Alone (1936) as President of Court Martial
- The Amazing Quest of Ernest Bliss (1936) as Sir James Alroyd
- The Man Behind the Mask (1936) as Lord Slade
- East Meets West (1936) as Stanton
- Everybody Dance (1936) as Sir Rowland Morton
- Windbag the Sailor (1936) as Minor Role
- Good Morning, Boys (1937) as Col. Willougby-Gore
- Return of a Stranger (1937) as Sir Herbert Tompkin
- Father Steps Out (1937) as Mr. Fitzwilliam
- Brief Ecstasy (1937) as Chairman of Steel Company
- Gangway (1937) as Assistant Commissioner Sir Brian Moore
- Jericho (1937) as Court Martial President
- Under a Cloud (1937) as Sir Edmond Jessyl
- Smash and Grab (1937) as Insurance Company Chairman
- The Last Adventurers (1937) as Fergus Arkell
- The Ticket of Leave Man (1937) as Joshua Gibson
- Easy Riches (1938) as Stacey Lang
- Scruffy (1938) as Chairman
- Convict 99 (1938) as Sir Cyril
- Alf's Button Afloat (1938) as Capt. Driscol R.N.
- Hey! Hey! USA (1938) as Ship's Captain
- Dead Men are Dangerous (1939) as Conray
- Inspector Hornleigh (1939) as Chancellor of the Exchequer
- Sword of Honour (1939) as Lord Carhampton
- Home from Home (1939) as Governor
- Ask a Policeman (1939) as Chief Constable
- Goodbye, Mr. Chips (1939) as Army General
- Secret Journey (1939) as Gen. von Reimer
- Flying Fifty-Five (1939) as Jonas Urquhart
- Riding High (1939) as Sir Joseph Wilmot
- What Would You Do, Chums? (1939) as Sir Douglas Gordon KC
- Where's That Fire? (1939) as Fire Chief
- Traitor Spy (1939) as Sir John
- They Came by Night (1940) as Commissionaire
- Laugh It Off (1940) as General
- Band Waggon (1940) as Claude Pilkington
- Crook's Tour (1940) as Minor Role
- Three Silent Men (1940) as General Bullingdon
- Two for Danger (1940) as Assistant Commissioner
- Gasbags (1941) as Commanding Officer
- Love on the Dole (1941) as Police Supt
- Inspector Hornleigh Goes To It (1941) as Colonel
- Old Mother Riley's Ghosts (1941) as Mr. Cartwright
- "Pimpernel" Smith (1941) as Sidimir Koslowski
- Cottage to Let (1941) as Senior RAF Officer
- I Thank You (1941) as Doctor Pope
- They Flew Alone (1942) as RAF Officer
- Let the People Sing (1942) as Maj. Shiptonthorpe
- The First of the Few (1942) as Board Member
- The Young Mr. Pitt (1942) as Admiral
- Much Too Shy (1942) as Plaintiff's Counsel
- Women Aren't Angels (1943) as H.G. Colonel
- We'll Meet Again (1943) as Theatre Manager
- Bell-Bottom George (1944) as Adm. Sir William Coltham
- The Hundred Pound Window (1944) as Van Rayden
- Murder in Reverse (1945) as One of Crossley's Guests
- This Man Is Mine (1946) as Businessman
- Nothing Venture (1948) as Scotland Yard Official
- The Case of Charles Peace (1949) as Mr. Justice Lopes
- Kind Hearts and Coronets (1949) as First Lord Delivering Verdict
- High Jinks in Society (1949) as Jenkins
- Soho Conspiracy (1950) as Father Shaney
- The Elusive Pimpernel (1950) as Chauvelin's Butler
- Death Is a Number (1951) as James Gregson
- Salute the Toff (1952) as Mortimer Harvey
- Paul Temple Returns (1952) as Sir Graham Forbes
- Knights of the Round Table (1953) as Bishop
- Five Days (1954) as Bowman
- Tale of Three Women (1954) as Sir Frederick (segment "Thief of London' story)

=== TV series ===
- Adventure Theater (1956, TV Series) - Sir Frederick (final appearance)
