= Ask a Policeman =

1939 British comedy film by Marcel Varnel

- Poster
- Directed by: Marcel Varnel
- Written by: Marriott Edgar; Sidney Gilliat (story); Val Guest; J. O. C. Orton
- Produced by: Edward Black
- Starring: Will Hay; Graham Moffatt; Moore Marriott; Glennis Lorimer; Peter Gawthorne; Charles Oliver; Herbert Lomas
- Cinematography: Derick Williams
- Edited by: R. E. Dearing
- Music by: Louis Levy
- Production company: Gainsborough Pictures
- Distributed by: Metro-Goldwyn-Mayer
- Release date: 28 August 1939
- Running time: 83 minutes
- Country: United Kingdom
- Language: English
- Budget: £58,173

Ask a Policeman is a 1939 British comedy film directed by Marcel Varnel and starring Will Hay, Moore Marriott and Graham Moffatt. It was written by Marriott Edgar, Sidney Gilliat, Val Guest and J. O. C. Orton.

The plot sees Will Hay playing a policeman at the Turnbotham Round police force. The title comes from the popular music hall song "Ask a P'liceman".

== Plot ==
Sergeant Dudfoot is talking about his life as a policeman at Turnbotham Round (pronounced Turn Bottom Round) during a radio broadcast. His staff Albert and Harbottle enter after they have been poaching and Harbottle ruins the broadcast.

The next day, Dudfoot receives a letter from the Chief Constable. The letter states that an investigation will shortly take place to see if the police force in Turnbotham Round is necessary at all since no arrests have been made in the ten years that Dudfoot has been a policeman. In order to keep their jobs, they decide to try and make an arrest. Dudfoot decides to set a speed trap and stops passing cars down a country lane just outside the village. After stopping and later releasing a man who has neither a licence nor insurance, Dudfoot, Harbottle and Albert stop, question and knock out another driver who is actually the Chief Constable. They drive the unconscious Chief Constable back to the police station and lock him in the cell. Dudfoot then drives the Chief Constable's car into Harbottle's shop window to create the impression that the Chief Constable had just had an accident. However, when the Chief Constable comes round, he fails to be fooled by the 'accident', but the Squire intervenes and claims to have witnessed the accident, which saves Dudfoot, Harbottle and Albert from a lot of trouble.

The Chief leaves after Harbottle makes up a story about a Headless Horseman when questioned about his old looks. Dudfoot states that they need to arrest a criminal soon or else their police station will be closed down and Harbottle takes him to the library to look for books on crime. On their way the coastguard stops them and tells them his brother a lighthouse keeper wants a light hung up on top of the police station as his grandmother is very ill and he agreed to the idea that if he could see the light on the Police Station tower he'd know his grandmother was still alive. (Harbottle misunderstands this, thinking that the grandmother is alone in the lighthouse, causing him to sob uncontrollably whenever the matter is mentioned.) Unknown to the policemen, this is connected to the smugglers.

Later Albert suggests that they should capture some smugglers by placing a keg of brandy on the beach and getting a witness to see what happens. Dudfoot comes back into the station with a fisherman, who is carrying a keg of brandy and Albert and Harbottle say they haven't taken their keg down to the beach yet, therefore resulting in two kegs of liquor.

Albert's girlfriend Emily screams and passes out as she claims to have seen a Headless Horseman. Later Albert spots the Headless Horseman too and after an encounter with him in the Squire's garage, they are scared off by the Horseman, though Harbottle finds a small package which he tucks away.

Back at the police station, the Chief Constable phones them about the smuggling and instructs them to find the navigational light the smugglers are using. In spite of the light episode with the coastguard, the three policemen brush off the idea that the coastguard is involved with smuggling. A warning note to keep their noses out of things that are not of their concern is wrapped around a stone thrown in through the police station window.

A ticking sound is heard from the package that Harbottle earlier picked up and they find pocket watches inside. Harbottle then recites a rhyme, which tells the legend of the Headless Horseman, although he doesn't know the last line, but his father does. So the trio decide to pay him a visit. Harbottle's father reveals the line thus also revealing the place, the Devil's Cave where the smuggling is taking place.

The trio investigate the cave, follow a tunnel and discover many barrels of liquor and other things that seemed to belong to Harbottle. They eventually discover that they are in their own cellar. They decide to call the Chief Constable, but are confronted by the Squire who reveals that he is the leader of the smugglers. After a fight in the dark, the smugglers lock the trio in their own cell and escape, deciding to give chase in their car, but since the other police agents think they are smugglers as well, their car is also wanted.

After a chase on a bike, a lorry and a London bus, the police agents finally capture the smugglers at Brooklands. The Chief Constable asks the Squire if he has seen him before, but the Squire denies this. Dudfoot then reveals the story of the accident at Harbottle's shop, and the Chief Constable orders that the trio be arrested. Dudfoot punches the Chief Constable and the trio run as fast as they can along the race track away from the other pursuing policemen.

== Cast ==
- Will Hay as Sergeant Samuel Dudfoot
- Graham Moffatt as Albert Brown
- Moore Marriott as Jerry Harbottle / Harbottle Senior
- Glennis Lorimer as Emily Martin
- Peter Gawthorne as Chief Constable
- Charles Oliver as the squire
- Herbert Lomas as The Coastguard
- Dave O'Toole as Dudfoot's witness
- Noel Dainton as revenue officer
- Cyril Chamberlain as radio announcer (uncredited)
- Brian Worth as broadcasting engineer
- Patrick Aherne as first motorist
- Desmond Llewelyn as "Headless Horsemen" (uncredited)

== Production ==
The film was produced by Gainsborough Pictures, distributed by Metro-Goldwyn-Mayer and released on 28 August, 1939.

Sidney Gilliat felt there were too many comedy routines in the film.

== Reception ==
The Monthly Film Bulletin wrote: "Here is a sound farcical situation, and the director turns it to good purpose. The film ends particularly well with a chase in the best style: the three policemen, pursuing the smugglers in a stolen bus, find their way on to Brooklands and drive round the course while a race is in progress in the opposite direction. The fun is mostly visual and there is little scope for that rather astringent humour of Will Hay's that is the making of his best work."

Kine Weekly wrote: "The picture takes a little time to warm up – the early gags could have been a little more original – but once it gets going it guys officialdom with spectacular and good humoured spontaneity. The audacity of the smugglers and the incredible dumbness of Dudfoot, Albert and Harbottle are the crux of the story as well as the keynote of its ridiculous yet shrewdly cultivated fooling, while the culmination is one of the most thrilling and laughable chases seen on the screen."

The film has a score of 89% on Rotten Tomatoes and 7.5 out of 10 from IMDb.

== Remakes ==
In 1982, comedy duo Cannon and Ball filmed a loose remake of Ask A Policeman, titled The Boys in Blue, which was directed by Val Guest, one of the screenwriters of Ask A Policeman. Though not a remake, 2007's Hot Fuzz borrowed the plot device of policemen uncovering organised crime in a sleepy area of rural England. The makers of the Indian film Naalu Policeum Nalla Irundha Oorum (2015) have acknowledged Ask a Policeman as an influence on it.

== Bibliography ==
- Luxford, Albert J. & Owen, Gareth. Albert J. Luxford, the gimmick man: memoir of a special effects maestro. McFarland & Company, 2002.
