= Charley's (Big-Hearted) Aunt =

1940 British film by Walter Forde

- Directed by: Walter Forde
- Written by: Brandon Thomas (original play); J.O.C. Orton (screenplay); Marriott Edgar (screenplay); Ralph Smart (screenplay)
- Produced by: Edward Black
- Starring: See below
- Cinematography: Arthur Crabtree
- Edited by: R.E. Dearing
- Music by: Louis Levy
- Production company: Gainsborough Pictures
- Distributed by: General Film Distributors (UK)
- Release date: 31 August 1940
- Running time: 75 minutes
- Country: UK
- Language: English

Charley's (Big-Hearted) Aunt is a 1940 British comedy film directed by Walter Forde, starring Arthur Askey and Richard Murdoch. The screenplay was by J.O.C. Orton, Marriott Edgar and Ralph Smart, adapted from the 1892 Victorian farce Charley's Aunt by Brandon Thomas. Arthur Askey's professional nickname was "Big-Hearted Arthur", which was added to the title to distinguish it from Jack Benny's version Charley's Aunt (1941), for its (limited) American release.

== Plot ==
Oxford students Arthur, Stinker, and Albert are in danger of being "sent down" (expelled) for bad behaviour. Learning that the Dean of Bowgate College is an amateur Egyptologist, Arthur – who had just played the lead in a stage version of Charley's Aunt – poses as Albert's wealthy Aunt Lucy, who might finance an archeological expedition if the Dean is lenient on her nephew and his friends. Unfortunately, the real Aunt Lucy picks this day to pay a visit to Oxford herself, with calamitous consequences.

== Differences from play ==
Aside from the Oxford setting and the premise of a male student impersonating his wealthy aunt, the film bears little resemblance to the original play. In one brief sequence, the play Charley's Aunt is shown being performed by the Oxford students.

== Cast ==
- Arthur Askey as Arthur Linden-Jones
- Richard Murdoch as "Stinker" Burton
- Graham Moffatt as Albert Brown
- Moore Marriott as Jerry
- J. H. Roberts as Dean of Bowgate
- Felix Aylmer as The Proctor
- Wally Patch as The Buller
- Leonard Sharp as Buller's assistant
- Phyllis Calvert as Betty Forsythe
- Jeanne de Casalis as Aunt Lucy
- Elliott Mason as Dame Luckton

== Production ==
It was one of several comedies Askey made for Gainsborough.

== Critical reception ==
According to Kinematograph Weekly the film did well at the British box office in September 1940.

The Monthly Film Bulletin wrote: "The film is built up so that the team of Arthur Askey, Richard (Stinker) Murdoch and Graham the fat boy, can run true to type. The plot is thin but the fun is fast and hilarious."

Kine Weekly wrote: "Riotous farcical comedy freely adapted from Brandon Thomas's all-time stage and screen success. The film, a rousing, exuberant rag, touches on every form of humour from slapstick to satire, and amplifies its great fun by clothing it in incongruous academic attire."

The Radio Times Guide to Films gave the film 2/5 stars, writing: "This is lacklustre, with English comedian Arthur Askey taking an only adequate stab at the role."

In British Sound Films: The Studio Years 1928–1959 David Quinlan rated the film as "good", writing: "Plot is thin, but laughs come thick and fast."

TV Guide wrote that "Brandon Thomas's oft-filmed farce (at least seven times since 1925) has frequently been better, but Askey gives it a good shot."

Sky Movies wrote that it is "tailored to the talents of the two stars, on the strength of their great success in the hit radio series Band Waggon. Those stalwarts of the British comedy film, 1935–45, plump Graham Moffatt and doddery Moore Marriott, are on hand to add to the fun, and the heroine is Phyllis Calvert, who was appearing in her second film."
