= Tom Marshall (artist) =

British model maker and image editor

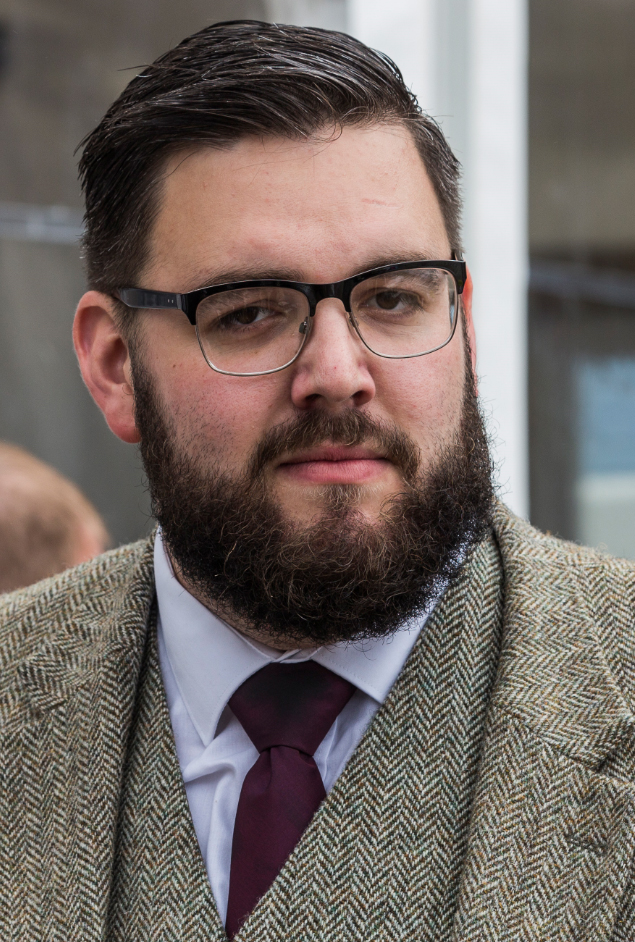
- Marshall in 2017
- Born: 25 February 1988 (age 38); Leicester, England
- Education: University of Lincoln
- Years active: 2014–present
- Website: www.photogra-fix.com

Tom Marshall (born 25 February 1988) is a British model maker, voice actor, director and image editor known for his colourisations of historical black and white photographs, often working under the name PhotograFix. He is a scale model maker with his model company Buggleskelly Station.

== Early life ==
Marshall was born in Leicester, England and grew up in Rutland and Melton Mowbray, Leicestershire. He studied Media Production at Brooksby Melton College and the University of Lincoln.

== Photo colourising career ==
Marshall's creative process involves adding colour to black and white photographs using Photoshop. For images where the colours aren't known or for historical photographs he relies on research for accuracy and his best judgement.

In a 2016 BBC interview, Marshall explained his motive behind photo colourisation. People "sadly don't take a lot of interest in a black and white photo, whereas if they see something that's turned into colour from 100 years ago, it generates a lot more interest"."

In 2016 the Irish Independent commissioned Marshall to colourise a series of photos from their archive taken during the Easter Rising. These were published in April 2017. Marshall's most notable projects have been those to mark centenaries of significant battles of the First World War including the Battle of the Somme and Battle of Passchendaele.

Marshall's work was published in Michael D. Carroll's 2017 book Retrographic: History's Most Exciting Images Transformed into Living Colour.

The Daily Telegraph published Marshall's photo of suffragettes Annie Kenney and Christabel Pankhurst on their front page on 6 February 2018 to illustrate 100 years since women won the right to vote. In April 2018, Marshall released a set of photos to mark 100 years since the formation of the Royal Air Force.

To mark the centenary of the end of World War I, in 2018 Marshall released a series of 100 colourised photos.

In January 2020 The Daily Telegraph published Marshall's colourised versions of John Thomson's 1877 photo series Street Life Victorian London. To mark the 75th anniversary of the liberation of Auschwitz, and Holocaust Memorial Day, Marshall colourised a series of photos of Holocaust victims taken throughout 1945. For the 75th anniversary of VE Day Marshall was commissioned by the Daily Express to colourise a selection of photos showing celebrations in London and New York.

In June 2020 Marshall released a series of photos showing the history of Black British people in Britain, including colourised photos of Walter Tull, Paul Stephenson and members of the Windrush generation.

To mark Black History Month in the United Kingdom, in October 2020 Marshall colourised a series of photos depicting Slavery in the United States during the mid nineteenth century.

As of July 2021, Marshall has a portfolio of hundreds of colourised photographs. In a 2020 BBC interview he stated "My favourite part has to be the reaction I get from people seeing the finished result, especially if it's a personal family photo that somebody may have had in black and white for decades. Some people have said they had cried upon opening their emails to see the faces of people from the past come to life."

For Remembrance Day 2021, Marshall released photo series depicting animals who served in the world wars. These included Simon the cat and Rip the dog who were both awarded the Dicken Medal for bravery.

In 2024, to mark the 150th anniversary of Winston Churchill's birth, the National Trust commissioned Marshall to colourise a series of photos of Churchill's birthday cakes. The photos were exhibited at Churchill's former home, Chartwell in Kent.

== Model making ==
Marshall is a model maker and railway modeller and founded the model company Buggleskelly Station. In September 2020 Marshall's model of 'Buggleskelly Station' from the Will Hay film 'Oh, Mr Porter!' appeared in Model Rail magazine. In 2023, Buggleskelly Station released scale railway models depicting the BBC sitcom Dad's Army.

== Voice acting ==
Marshall was the UK narrator for the 2022 Thomas and Friends episode as part of Project Tiger Moth, The Good Old Days.

== The Will Hay Appreciation Society ==
Marshall has a long standing interest in the British comic actor Will Hay and founded the Will Hay Appreciation Society in 2009. In 2016 Marshall directed the short documentary Will Hay and the Stars about Hay's astronomy. In 2018 he directed the short film Graham Moffatt: Britain's Favourite Fat Boy about the life of comic actor Graham Moffatt.

On 14th September 2024, the Will Hay Appreciation Society unveiled a memorial plaque to the comic actor Moore Marriott at his final home in Bognor Regis. The plaque was unveiled by Bob Golding and the event was presented by Tom Marshall.

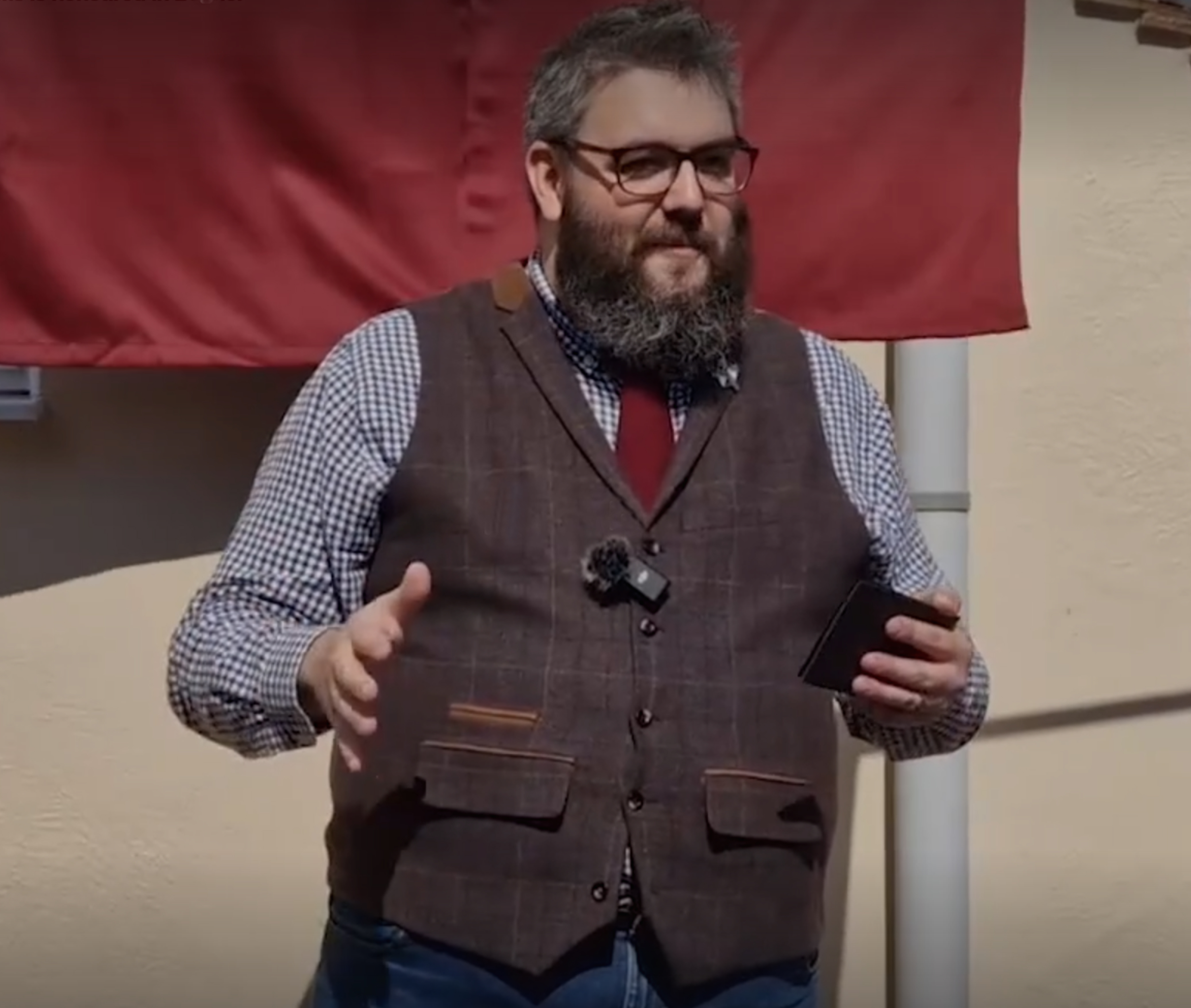
Marshall at a memorial event for the comic actor Moore Marriott in September 2024.
