= Button's Mill =

Button's Mill was the name of a number of windmills in the United Kingdom.

- Button's Mill, Diss, Norfolk
- Button's Mill, Thelnetham, Suffolk
