= Terling Windmill =

Windmill in Terling, Essex, England

Terling Mill
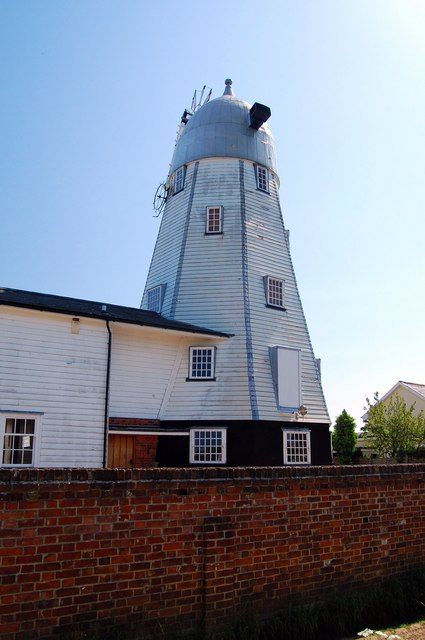

Origin
- Mill name: Terling Mill
- Grid reference: TL 764 150
- Coordinates: 51.806°N 0.559°E
- Operator(s): Private
- Year built: c1818

Information
- Purpose: Originally a bark mill, later a Corn mill
- Type: Smock mill
- Storeys: Four-storey smock
- Base storeys: Single-storey base
- Smock sides: Eight-sided smock
- No. of sails: Four sails
- Type of sails: Double Patent sails
- Windshaft: Cast iron
- Winding: Fantail
- Fantail blades: Eight blades
- No. of pairs of millstones: Two pairs

Terling Windmill is a grade II listed Smock mill at Terling, Essex, England, which has been converted to residential use.

== History ==
Terling Windmill was built here in c.1818. It is said to have been originally built at Cressing c1770, but this has neither been proved nor disproved. Originally it was a bark mill, but was advertised for sale in 1818 as “new built” and “may be converted to corn grinding at an inconsiderable expense” The mill may have been built here by Chappell, a millwright from Witham.

The mill was painted white until 1929 when the smock was tarred. In 1935, the mill was damaged in a gale and lost its fantail. A new pair of sails from Button's Mill, Diss, Norfolk was fitted in the 1930s. They were brought from Diss by rail and then horse and cart. The mill was working by wind until 1949, and afterwards by external power. On 30 August 1950, the miller was trapped in the machinery and killed, despite the best efforts of the fire brigade to rescue him. Thus the working life of the mill ended. The mill was house converted in 1970, with the major machinery being retained, and its external appearance restored.

== Description ==
Terling Windmill is a four-storey smock mill on a single-storey brick base. A stage was not used. The mill had four double Patent sails and the domed cap was winded by a fantail. When the mill was working, it had a tarred smock with a white cap. After conversion, the mill was painted white, with the cap clad in aluminium sheets.

=== Mill ===
Terling Windmill has an octagonal single-storey brick base. The walls of which are 28 inches (711 mm) thick at ground level. The base is 21 feet 6 inches (6.55 m) across the flats and 9 feet 6 inches (2.90 m) high. The brickwork at the top of the base is about 17 inches (432 mm) thick.

The smock shows signs of having been dismantled and transported in sections at some point, with the cant posts being newer than the framing. The tower is 35 feet 4 inches (10.77 m) to the curb, and the domed cap rises 10 feet 10 inches (3.30 m) above the curb to the underside of the finial, giving the mill an overall height of about 56 feet (17.07 m).

=== Sails and windshaft ===
Terling Windmill has a cast-iron windshaft and four double Patent sails. The last working pair of sails came from Button's Mill, Diss, Norfolk, having originally been on the post mill at Mount Pleasant, Framlingham, Suffolk. They had a span of 66 feet (20.12 m) and were 9 feet (2.74 m) wide. The sails now on the mill have a span of 74 feet (22.56 m).

=== Machinery ===
The wooden Brake Wheel is of clasp arm construction, 10 feet 8 inches (3.25 m) diameter, with 96 cogs. This drives an iron Wallower of 5 feet 4 inches (1.63 m) with 47 cogs. At the lower end of the 25 feet (7.62 m) long wooden Upright Shaft is the clasp arm Great Spur Wheel, which has 108 cogs, and drove three pairs of millstones. The two pairs of French Burr stones being driven by Stone Nuts with 26 cogs, whilst the Peak stones were driven by a Stone Nut with 25 cogs.

=== Fantail ===
Terling Windmill was winded by an eight-bladed fantail, driving an iron worm on the curb.

== Millers ==
- Wood 1818
- Frederick Rust 1859
- Charles Joseph Doe 1882 – 1902
- Martin Bonner 1902 – 1912
- Herbert Bonner 1914 – 1950

References for above:-

== Culture and media ==
Terling Windmill featured in the 1937 film Oh, Mr. Porter! starring Will Hay.
