= Where's That Fire? =

1940 film by Marcel Varnel

- Opening titles
- Directed by: Marcel Varnel
- Written by: Marriott Edgar; Val Guest; J. O. C. Orton
- Produced by: Edward Black
- Starring: Will Hay; Graham Moffatt; Moore Marriott; Charles Hawtrey
- Cinematography: Arthur Crabtree
- Edited by: R. E. Dearing
- Production company: Twentieth Century Productions Ltd
- Distributed by: Twentieth Century Fox
- Release date: 6 January 1940
- Running time: 82 minutes
- Country: United Kingdom
- Language: English

Where's That Fire? is a 1940 British comedy film, produced by Twentieth Century Fox, directed by Marcel Varnel and starring Will Hay, Moore Marriott and Graham Moffatt. It was written by Marriott Edgar, Val Guest and J. O. C. Orton. It was the last film Will Hay made with his most famous comic foils, Moore Marriott and Graham Moffatt.

== Plot ==
Incompetent Fire Captain Viking fails to find a large fire, gets lost in the process and ends up on a newspaper headline as 'The engine that never made it'. Finally upon arriving at the location of the fire (discovering it's been put out) he hears that his local town hall is on fire.

After failing to appear before the town hall burns down, Fire Captain Viking is told to put out a fire successfully or else he and his men face the sack. Viking and his crew, Albert and Harbottle, proceed to London to gain more experience of an efficient fire station, with Albert and Harbottle "knocking-off" several items.

Shortly after embarking on a series of dangerous exploits to improve the efficiency of his fire department including automated turn out equipment and destroying public property with a fireman's pole, Captain Viking accidentally creates a new form of firefighting foam that he wishes to demonstrate in London, the London fire department begins to assess the formula for the foam and intends to get in touch with them shortly after.

Meanwhile a group of criminals having seen Vikings fire engine in the newspaper wish to hire it for what Viking and his crew believe to be a film, Viking initially refuses but promises they can borrow the engine after his foam has been demonstrated in London, (Also after the criminals offer a £30 bribe to him and his crew). The criminals intent then being revealed to be the theft of the Crown jewels from the Tower of London as Vikings engine is almost identical to the Tower fire engine.

Harbottle becomes impatient waiting for his money and decides to start a large fire at a Petrol Station to allow the foam to be demonstrated and for the news to reach London, with Albert reminding them if they fail to put out this fire they will be sacked. After failing to turn out for nearly half-an-hour thanks to Vikings automated turn out equipment they arrive at the fire, after a series of problems with hoses they start spraying the blaze only to discover that their hose is hooked up to a petrol pump, the result being the entire petrol station burning to the ground.

Now facing the sack Viking and his crew enjoy a brief reprieve when the Mayors house catches fire, however upon returning to their fire station they discover their engine and horse are both missing, the engine having been stolen by the criminals and their horse simply following it.

Realizing they will now be sacked they hear that their horse has been found in the London borough of Wapping, whilst packing Viking finds a letter from the London fire brigade wishing him and his crew to demonstrate their firefighting foam in London the next day. Viking and his crew now proceed to London to recover their engine full of foam.

The eventually trace their engine to the Tower of London where the criminals are setting a fake fire to distract the Guards and gain access to the jewel tower. When Viking finds his engine and believes this to be an actual fire he sprays the entire area with his firefighting foam, stopping the criminals in the process. Shortly after this the London fire brigade and Police turn up to deal with the fire and criminals, the criminals complaining that they would have pulled off the heist had it not been for the foam, the fire brigade chief wishes to know who is responsible when Viking, Albert and Harbottle appear wearing the Crown Jewels.

== Cast ==
- Will Hay as Captain Viking
- Moore Marriott as Jeremiah Harbottle
- Graham Moffatt as Albert
- Peter Gawthorne as Fire Chief
- Eric Clavering as Hank Sullivan
- Hugh McDermott as Jim Baker
- Charles Hawtrey as Woodley
- Dave O'Toole as postman

== Production ==
The location of the fire station (external shots only) is the former Angel and Crown pub overlooking the village pond, by the junction of Milespit Hill and High St, Mill Hill, London NW7. The pub was demolished in 2015.

== Reception ==
The Monthly Film Bulletin wrote: "The film provides a lot of knockabout fun and bickering, the funniest scenes being the manceuvring of a long pole across a street with its inevitable destruction of car windows, etc., and the final scene of the fight in about four feet of thick foam. The pace of the film is quite well held but there is nothing outstanding or very original in it."

The Daily Film Renter wrote: "Rollicking comedy starring Will Hay as chief of ragtime village fire brigade, with Moffatt and Marriott in familiar stooge roles. ... Pithy dialogue, big-scale production, and lashings of crazy fun help to put this well into recommended class as capital entertainment for popular halls, while stellar name represents big draw."

Picture Show wrote: "Will Hay at his best, and the same may be said of his two tried and trusted assistants, Moore Marriott and Graham Moffatt. ... The whole film is slapstick and no attempt is made to introduce a serious or romantic note. But it is slapstick of the best, and is one long laugh."

== Preservation status ==
Although Where's That Fire? has never been officially released on home video, the British Film Institute has several prints, including a 35mm duplicating positive, in their possession since 1939. The film is copyrighted until 2076, the 2006 death of co-writer Val Guest plus 70 years. However the film is available on YouTube.

In April 2019, a 35 mm print of the film was screened by Warwick Student Cinema in collaboration with the Will Hay Appreciation Society.

== See also ==
- List of firefighting films
