= Dave O'Toole =

British actor (1871–1951)

Dave O'Toole (1871–1951) was a British male actor who appeared in seven films from 1924 to 1942. He is best known for his appearance as The Postman in the 1937 Will Hay comedy film Oh, Mr Porter! He also made an uncredited appearance in the 1939 film Ask a Policeman as well as Where's That Fire?, both starring Hay.

== Selected filmography ==
- The Gold Cure (1925)
