= Playmates (Around the Town) =

1922 film

Playmates within cinema of the United Kingdom, is a 1922 silent comic film clip of the (then) young comedian Will Hay dressed as a school boy, and playing with a girl and some mechanical children's toys, from his theatrical revue 'Listening In'.

== Synopsis ==
Introducing some clever mechanical toys, M'lita Dolores dressed as a young girl, stands on steps in front of a door - enter Will Hay dressed as a schoolboy. They show each other a number of toy animals that walk and jump. They quarrel and he boylike wants the best, takes away a toy which she snatches back. They squabble but make up, and leave with an arm around each other.

Allegedly very scratchy but watchable, the clip is stored with the National Film and Television Archive.

== Cast ==
- Will Hay
- M'lita Dolores

== Notes and references ==
1. 'Listening In' was a variety show produced August 1922 by Julius Darewski at the Apollo Theatre, London. See 'Good Morning Boys' (Ray Seaton and Roy Martin, London, 1978 pp. 37–8).
