= Old Bones of the River =

- Contemporary advertisement
- Directed by: Marcel Varnel
- Written by: Marriott Edgar; Val Guest; J. O. C. Orton
- Starring: Will Hay; Graham Moffatt; Moore Marriott
- Cinematography: Arthur Crabtree
- Edited by: R. E. Dearing; Alfred Roome
- Distributed by: General Film Distributors
- Release date: December 1938
- Running time: 90 minutes
- Country: United Kingdom
- Language: English

Old Bones of the River is a 1938 British comedy film directed by Marcel Varnel and starring Will Hay, Moore Marriott and Graham Moffatt. It was written by Marriott Edgar, Val Guest and J. O. C. Orton based on characters created by Edgar Wallace.

The film is a spoof of the 1935 film Sanders of the River.

== Plot ==
Professor Benjamin Tibbetts, a representative of the Teaching & Welfare Institution for the Reformation of Pagans (otherwise known as T.W.I.R.P for short), is dedicated to spreading education amongst the natives of colonial Africa.

Professor Tibbetts is the uncle of Lt. Tibbetts, known as "Bones", so the Professor is referred to as "Old Bones".

As he arrives (still trying to learn the native language via recordings), Professor Tibbetts is tricked into sneaking a gin still into the country by Prince M'Bapi, half-brother of Bosambo, chief of the Ochori tribe. The steamer that brings him takes Commissioner Sanders on leave, with Captain Hamilton taking over his duties.

Later, Tibbetts makes his way to Kombooli High, where his students wear Eton collars alongside their native garb. Tibbetts dons a mortarboard but wears safari shorts under his gown owing to the heat.

When Hamilton falls ill with a dose of malaria, Tibbetts is forced to take over his duties, which include collecting the taxes. Travelling upriver by canoe, he finds Sanders' paddlesteamer the Zaire, operated by Harbottle and Albert.

M'Bapi leads a revolt against Bosambo, and the threesome rescue a baby from death by sacrifice.

== Cast ==
- Will Hay as Professor Benjamin Tibbetts
- Moore Marriott as Jerry Harbottle
- Graham Moffatt as Albert
- Lucius Blake as Sergeant Abiboo
- Robert Adams as Bosambo
- Jack London as M'Bapi
- Wyndham Goldie as Commissioner Sanders
- Jack Livesey as Captain Hamilton

== Production ==
The film was one of several Hay made for producer Ted Black at Gainsborough.

== Reception ==
The Monthly Film Bulletin wrote: "This is a roaring farce which gets steadily more and more funny as it proceeds. Will Hay, whether he is taking a native school, washing a small black baby, or merely sprinkling tintacks in front of the invading bare-footed warriors, is his own inimitable self; Moore Marriott is sufficiently senile as the aged captain of a decrepit river steamer, and Robert Adams makes of the loyal Bosambo quite an impressive figure. Occasionally the 'River' looks suspiciously like the Thames, but that is only a minor blemish in this light-hearted comedy."

The Daily Film Renter wrote: "Will Hay has typical role of pompous muddler, interpolating famous schoolroom patter, extracting full quota of laughs from scenes ... Graham Moffatt and Moore Marriott again appear as familiar stooges, African settings are most convincing, and dialogue has sparkle. Rousing fun for the populars and Hay fans."

Picturegoer wrote: "Settings are very good and the picture as a whole is another success for the astronomer comedian."

Picture Show wrote: "The work of Moore Marriott and Graham Moffatt with Will Hay in this film once again, points to the fact that the trio provides far better comedy than the solo star. Edgar Wallace's well-known stories form the 'bones' of this comedy, the flesh and blood giving new life to them. ... The comedy moves briskly, with a host of hilarious situations."
