= Wheeltapper =

Railway safety worker

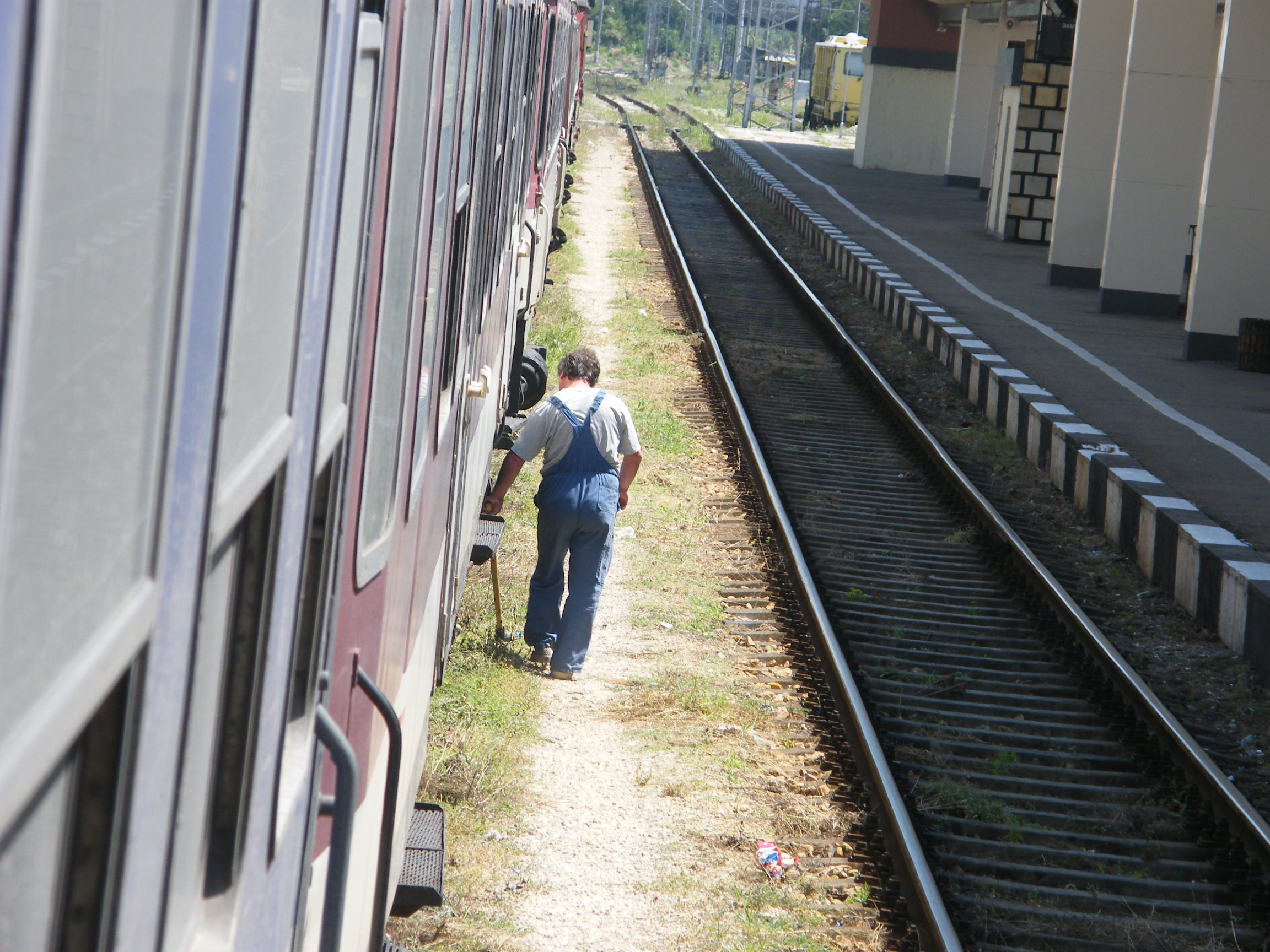
A wheeltapper at work on the Bulgarian railway in 2009.

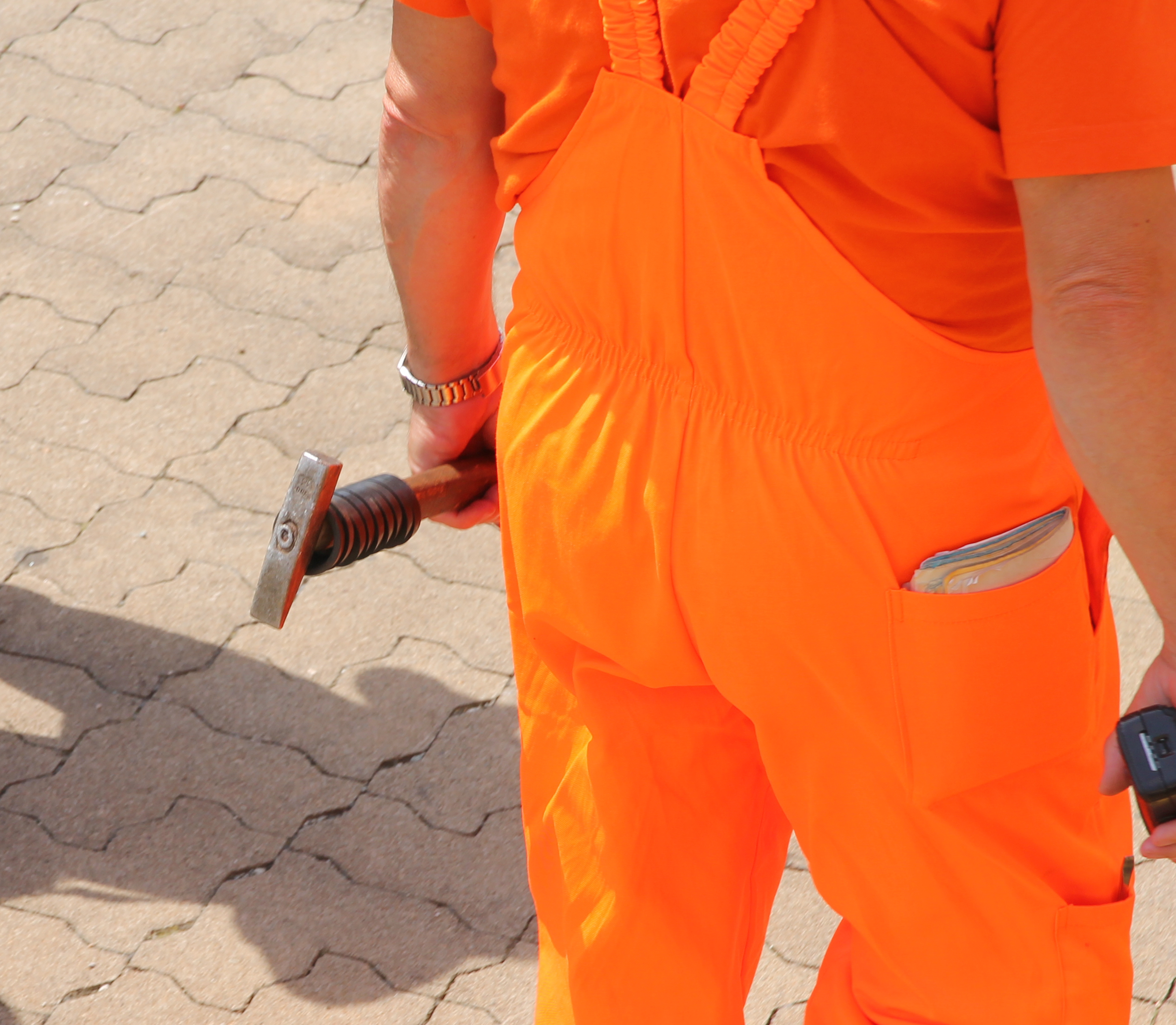
A wheeltapper's hammer with the rings.

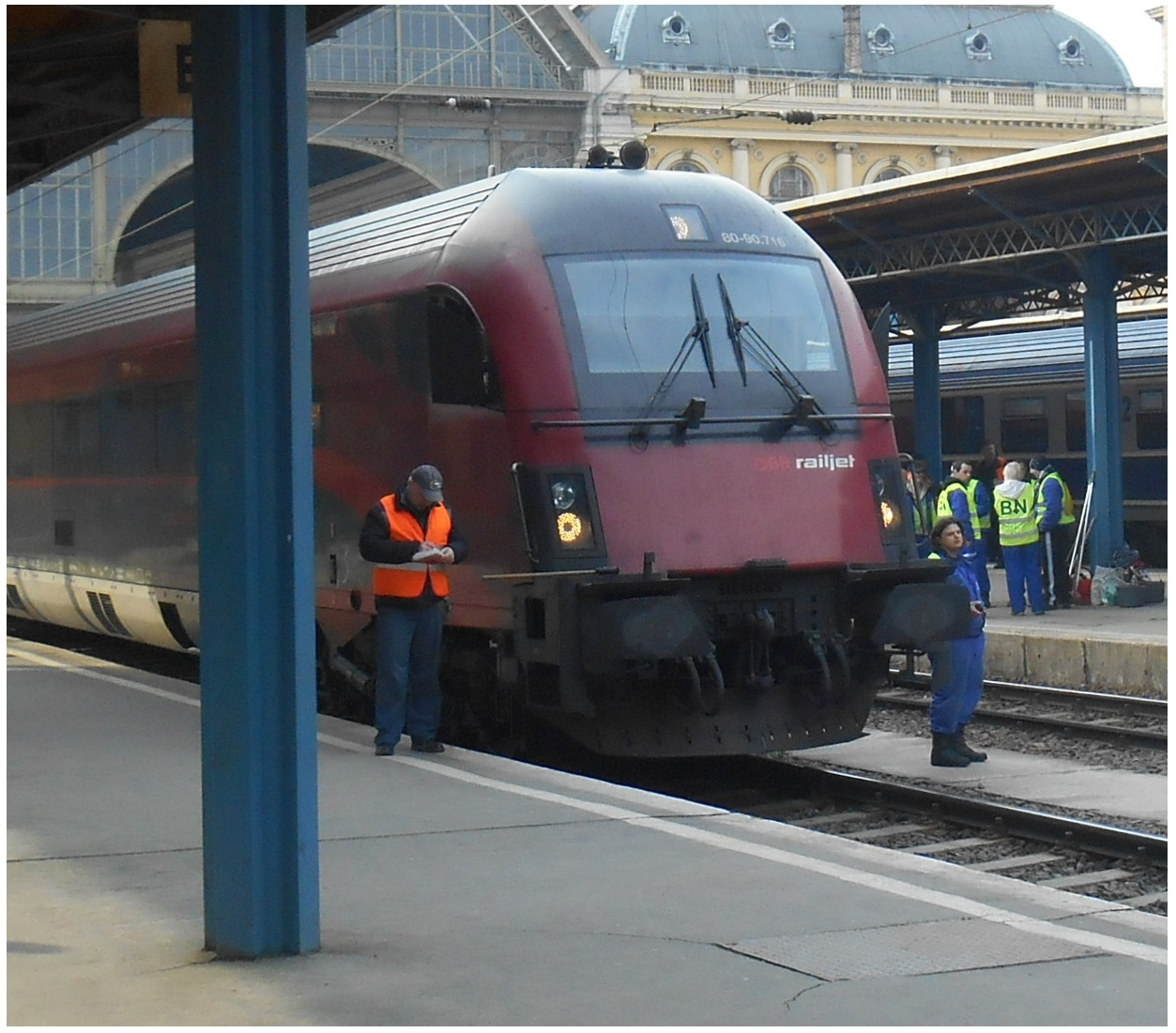
A wheeltapper signing off after checking the wheels of a train at Budapest-Keleti railway station in 2014. He has placed his long hammer on the train's buffers.

A wheeltapper is a railway worker employed to check the structural integrity of train wheels and that axle boxes are not overheating.

Typically employed at large urban railway stations and in goods yards, they tap wheels with a long-handled hammer and listen to the sound made to determine the integrity of the wheel; cracked wheels, like cracked bells, do not sound the same as their intact counterparts (they do not "ring true").

Wheeltappers also check that the axle boxes are not too hot by using the back of their hand.

Although wheeltappers still operate in some eastern European countries, in countries with modern planned maintenance procedures and line-side defect detectors, such as hot box detectors, wheeltappers are redundant. The job is mostly associated with the steam age. Wheeltappers were vital to the smooth running of the railways as a cracked wheel or overheated axle bearing would lead to delays and the loss of revenue. These were particularly common in the 19th century, when axle bearings were lubricated by grease. At this time, metallurgy was a more haphazard science and thus it was impossible to test steel wheels for cracks: the role of the wheeltapper was of crucial importance.

== Anecdote ==
There is an anecdote of a wheeltapper who had worked diligently for years wheeltapping without ever questioning or understanding the purpose. This originated with Rudyard Kipling in Delhi, and is referenced in his work Captains Courageous of 1897, although it had spread to the United States by 1932. Another version of the tale is told in the 1937 Will Hay British comedy film Oh, Mr Porter! A German version of the story was told by the German humourist Sigismund von Radecki.

In Tolstoy's Anna Karenina, a railway worker is accidentally killed. He is probably a wheeltapper, and the man's gruesome death anticipates Anna's eventual suicide.

== See also ==
- Oh, Mr Porter!, a 1937 film in which Will Hay plays a wheeltapper at the start of the story
- The Wheeltappers and Shunters Social Club, a 1970s British television programme for which the set was a Working Men's Club
