= Cheer Boys Cheer =

1939 British film by Walter Forde

- Directed by: Walter Forde
- Written by: Roger MacDougall; Allan MacKinnon
- Story by: Donald Bull; Ian Dalrymple
- Produced by: Michael Balcon
- Starring: Nova Pilbeam; Edmund Gwenn; Jimmy O'Dea; Graham Moffatt; Moore Marriott; Peter Coke
- Cinematography: Ronald Neame
- Edited by: Ray Pitt
- Music by: Van Phillips; Alfred Ralston
- Production company: Ealing Studios
- Distributed by: Associated British Film Distributors
- Release date: August 1939
- Running time: 84 minutes
- Country: United Kingdom
- Language: English

Cheer Boys Cheer is a 1939 British comedy film directed by Walter Forde and starring Nova Pilbeam, Edmund Gwenn, Jimmy O'Dea, Graham Moffatt, Moore Marriott and Peter Coke.

== Plot ==
Edward Ironside, the head of Ironside Brewery Ltd, informs his board of directors of his intention to expand the company's reach by taking over almost one hundred pubs under the control of another London-based brewery, Greenleaf. Ironside have adopted a modern, industrial approach to brewing and their newest board member, Naseby takes a disdainful view of Ironside's ambitions, suggesting that the company are sacrificing taste and quality for increase production.

Ironside's attitude is sharply contrasted by the Greenleaf brewery, which maintains a casual, friendly relationship with employees and has been run by the family for almost 150 years. Ironside has purchased as many shares in Greenleaf as possible but the owner, Tom Greenleaf, retains a majority share. Edmund Ironside visits Tom Greenleaf at the Cross Keys Inn, with his son, Ironside's Director of Publicity, John, instructing him that "the Greenleaf brewery has got to go".

Following a misunderstanding that Ironside desires to purchase Greenleaf's prized Toby Jug collection, rather than his brewery, Tom consults his headstrong daughter Margaret who demands he refuse the offer, despite Tom previously admitting to one of his employees, Matt Boyle that the company were having some financial difficulties. Incensed, Ironside threatens Greenleaf that they have one week to accept his offer.

John Ironside arranges to have dinner with Margaret Greenleaf at the Cross Keys Inn though hides his true identity as a member of the Ironside team. Masquerading as an advertising executive, he tricks his way into the Greenleaf company where he plots to sabotage the brewery. As John spends time in the jovial atmosphere at Greenleaf, he finds the ways of working and light-hearted attitudes appealing and calls his father to announce he will be remaining at Greenleaf as their advertising manager, where profits are already beginning to increase. He and Margaret take an unsuccessful drive in a motorcar where he asks Margaret to marry him, to which she enthusiastically agrees.

Unbeknown to them, Matt also harbours feelings for Margaret and asks her father, Tom, if he can use the upcoming 150th anniversary celebrations to propose to her. Following a theatrical show and passionate recital of 'Old Obadiah' Matt presents Tom with an oversized Toby Jug. Tom then announces to the crowd that his daughter Margaret is to be married to Matt. Horrified at the misunderstanding, Margaret tells her father that she is betrothed to John, as Matt celebrates outside. Edmund Ironside then arrives, informing Tom that his son, John Ironside, has been working at Greenleaf under his instructions, deliberately sabotaging their operation. John is dismayed and refuses to ever return to his father's brewery. Ironside tells Greenleaf that "you can't hold out against Ironsides" and sends a group of thugs to the Coach and Horses, a Greenleaf pub. A bar fight ensures, with Greenleaf employees and staff facing off against the heavies.

Tom becomes distressed at the damage to both his premises and employees and debates conceding to Ironside, to which he is encouraged to continue to fight. John tries to explain to Margaret, persuading the Greenleafs that he can fight his father as he knows his underhand tricks. Meanwhile Matt, who is still drunk from the previous night's antics, enters an Ironside board meeting and ends up giving his ten Greenleaf shares to Ironside, finally giving Ironside the a majority stake. He telephones Tom, gloating that he will be closing down the Greenleaf houses.

John devises a plan to beat Ironsides by tainting their beer with a specially-brewed mixture which makes drinkers cry uncontrollably. This leads to a sensation, with Ironside facing closure as the board of directors sob into their beer mugs. John offers his father a chance to remain in business by agreeing to sell Greenleaf ales in all of their pubs, to which Ironside reluctantly agrees. When Tom hears of the plot, he refuses to sign the agreements as he does not approve of John's underhand methods and feels he can't take advantage of Ironside's misfortune. Tom finally agrees when John and Margaret tell him of their wedding, resulting in the happy union of Greenleaf and Ironside.

== Cast ==
- Nova Pilbeam as Margaret Greenleaf
- Edmund Gwenn as Edward Ironside
- Jimmy O'Dea as Matt Boyle
- Moore Marriott as Geordie
- Graham Moffatt as Albert Baldwin
- C. V. France as Tom Greenleaf
- Peter Coke as John Ironside
- Alexander Knox as Saunders
- Ivor Barnard as Naseby
- Walter Forde as pianist at wedding
- James Knight as Ironside's chauffeur
- Hay Plumb as Greenleaf employee
- Charles Rolfe as Ironside thug
- Harry Terry as brewery worker
- Jean Webster-Brough as Maggie

== Production ==
The film was made by Ealing Studios, almost a year after Michael Balcon had taken over from Basil Dean as head of production. Filming began in late March 1939, after director Walter Forde spent a week travelling hundreds of miles visiting breweries throughout England, conducting research and scouting locations. Ultimately, the largest stage at Ealing Studios was used, with a fully functional brewery and yard constructed. Production completed two days ahead of schedule in early May 1939.

Nova Pilbeam was best known as a child actress and had last been seen by audiences in Alfred Hitchcock's Young and Innocent (1937). She had recently married Pen Tennyson, a promising young film director who had recently completed his first film for Ealing, There Ain't No Justice (1939)

The film was produced in the months leading up to World War Two with the arrogant, uncompromising attitude of Nazi Germany conveyed with Ironside's dictatorial owner, who is seen reading Mein Kampf in one scene. In contrast, Greenleaf is a clear allegory for pre-war Great Britain, with pastoral imagery conjured by the brewery's location and name and a democratic attitude to managing workers. It was the last Ealing film to be released before the outbreak of war.

== Reception ==
The film has come to be seen as a precursor of the later "Ealing Comedies, sharing a similar theme of big versus small, traditional versus modern with the later films which began with Hue and Cry (1947).

Kine Weekly said: "Any absence of piquancy and originality in theme is ... offset by exuberant team-work and generous production values. By the time the picture ends it has to its credit a clean well-balanced light entertainment of wide appeal".

Monthly Film Bulletin wrote: "Farcical comedy. ... The best performance is given by Jimmy O'Dea as the Irish brewer at Greenleaf's, who turns prohibitionist whenever he becomes drunk."

In British Sound Films David Quinlan called the film "a pleasing slice of life, if not especially funny."

The Radio Times Guide to Films gave the film 3/5 stars, writing: "A pleasing British comedy."

== Bibliography ==
- Perry, George. Forever Ealing: A Celebration of the Great British Film Studio. Pavilion, 1981.
