= Convict 99 =

1938 British film by Marcel Varnel

- Directed by: Marcel Varnel
- Written by: Cyril Campion; Jack Davis Jr; Marriott Edgar; Val Guest; Ralph Smart
- Produced by: Edward Black
- Starring: Will Hay; Graham Moffatt; Moore Marriott; Googie Withers
- Cinematography: Arthur Crabtree
- Edited by: R. E. Dearing
- Distributed by: Gainsborough Pictures
- Release date: 26 September 1938
- Running time: 91 minutes
- Country: United Kingdom
- Language: English

Convict 99 is a 1938 British comedy film directed by Marcel Varnel and starring Will Hay, Moore Marriott, Graham Moffatt and Googie Withers. It was written by Cyril Campion, Jack Davis Jr, Marriott Edgar, Val Guest and Ralph Smart. It was one of several comedies Hay made for producer Edward Black.

== Plot ==
Incompetent Dr Benjamin Twist is dismissed from his job as headmaster at St. Michael's School (the school returns in The Ghost of St. Michael's (1941)), and applies for a job in another school.

Going for interview, he is called into another office where they are expecting John Benjamin, a strict prison governor recently arrived from Australia who is applying for the vacancy at Blackdown Prison in Devon. On the way to what Twist believes is the school, he becomes drunk, and on arrival is mistaken for Max Slessor, a prisoner who had escaped during a jailbreak.

Designated Convict 99 and in for seven years for forgery, Twist is soon discovered to be the new Prison Governor, and once put in his (dubiously) rightful place embarks on a programme to make the prison a more friendly place for the prisoners, funding it from the proceeds of a football pools win and stock market investments.

Things take a turn for the worse, when the recaptured Slessor escapes again with a signed cheque. Altering the figures, he draws the entire prison funds from the bank. Twist and some of the convicts head in a prison van to Limehouse, in east London, to catch Slessor, recover the lost funds and then successfully break into the bank in the middle of the night to return the money.

== Cast ==
- Will Hay as Dr. Benjamin Twist
- Moore Marriott as Jerry "The Mole"
- Graham Moffatt as Albert
- Googie Withers as Lottie "The Baroness"
- Peter Gawthorne as Sir Cyril
- Basil Radford as Deputy Governor
- Dennis Wyndham as Head Warder
- Wilfred Walter as Max Slessor
- Alf Goddard as Sykes
- Basil McGrail as Bates
- Kathleen Harrison as Mable
- Roddy McDowall as Jimmy
- Teddy Brown as Charlie "Slim Charlie"
- Bertha Belmore as tiara lady
- George Merritt as patrolman
- Roy Emerton as John Benjamin
- Leonard Sharp as convict
- Garry Marsh as Johnson

== Reception ==
=== Box office ===
Kinematograph Weekly reported the film did well at the British box office in September 1938.

=== Critical ===
The Monthly Film Bulletin wrote: "The farcical situations are carried to such wild extremes that they mostly defeat their own ends. There are, however, some good ideas and some effective comic 'business'. The fault of the film as a whole is that it is not slick enough. The director builds up to his climaxes and then prolongs the scenes into anti-climaxes. ... The dialogue is much too longwinded."

The Daily Film Renter wrote: "Will Hay in top form, with magnificent support from Moore Marriott and Graham Moffatt. Sure-fire popular laugh entertainment, with 100 per cent box-office pull and a riot for star following. This latest Will Hay fun fiesta broadly lampoons the current trend in prison reform, as well as supplying the comedian with abundant opportunities for characteristic humour in a setting not usually associated with hilarity."

Allen Eyles wrote for BFI Screenonline: "Some of the routines were hardly fresh ... but it is the way in which the conventions of the prison drama are adapted to the comic personas of Will Hay and Moore Marriott that makes an outstanding comedy, while the pattern of mistaken identity and reversals of fortune render it a pungent satire."
