= Vera Frances =

British actress (1930–2026)

- Born: Vera Frances Still; 29 September 1930; Dagenham, Essex, England
- Died: 7 January 2026 (aged 95)
- Occupation: Actress
- Years active: 1942–1948 (In acting)
- Spouse: Dennis William Ward (m. 1953; died 2000)

Vera Frances Ward (née Still, 29 September 1930 – 7 January 2026) was a British actress who worked with Arthur Askey, Tommy Handley, George Formby, Dinah Sheridan, John Mills and Alastair Sim, amongst others.

== Life and career ==
Frances was born in Dagenham, Essex, England on 29 September 1930. Her father was a props and special effects man for Gainsborough Pictures at Lime Grove Studios in Shepherd's Bush. She made her first film appearance in Back-Room Boy as the Cockney girl Jane. She then went on to make another six films.

In her late teens, Frances left film to follow her ambition to be a dance teacher. This proved to be very successful and resulted in a dance school. After marrying Dennis William Ward in 1953, Frances moved the school to March, Cambridgeshire. Dennis died in Cambridge in 2000, at the age of 73. In a February 2008 interview, Frances stated that she stopped making films because there were limited opportunities available for her when transitioning from a child actress.

Frances died on 7 January 2026, at the age of 95.

== Filmography ==
Year	Title	Role	Notes
1942	Back-Room Boy	Jane	First role
1942	Partners in Crime	Girl	Uncredited
1942	King Arthur Was a Gentleman	Vera	
1943	It's That Man Again	Daisy	
1943	Get Cracking	Irene	Uncredited
1945	Waterloo Road	Vera Colter	
1948	Good-Time Girl	Edie	Final role
