= The Gold Cure (1925 film) =

1925 film

- Directed by: W. P. Kellino
- Written by: Sara Jeanette Duncan (story); Lydia Hayward
- Starring: Queenie Thomas; Gladys Hamer; Jameson Thomas; Eric Bransby Williams
- Cinematography: Jack E. Cox
- Production company: Stoll Pictures
- Distributed by: Stoll Pictures
- Release date: October 1925
- Running time: 5,700 feet
- Country: United Kingdom
- Languages: Silent; English intertitles

The Gold Cure is a 1925 British silent comedy film directed by W. P. Kellino and starring Queenie Thomas, Gladys Hamer and Jameson Thomas. It was made by Stoll Pictures at Cricklewood Studios.

== Cast ==
- Queenie Thomas as Betty Van Allen
- Gladys Hamer as Bella Box
- Jameson Thomas as Lansing Carter
- Eric Bransby Williams as Lord Dinacre
- Albert E. Raynor as Mr. Van Allen
- Moore Marriott as Janbois
- Judd Green as Mr. Box
- Leal Douglas as Lady Dunacre
- Johnny Butt as Albert Horsey
- Jefferson Gore as Dennis O'Shamus
- Nell Emerald as Nora Flanegan
- Dave O'Toole as Mick Mulvaney

== Bibliography ==
- Low, Rachael. History of the British Film, 1918–1929. George Allen & Unwin, 1971.
