= Moore Marriott =

English character actor (1885–1949)

- Born: George Thomas Moore Marriott; 14 September 1885; Yiewsley, Middlesex, England
- Died: 11 December 1949 (aged 64); Bognor Regis, Sussex, England
- Occupation: Character actor
- Years active: 1912–1949

George Thomas Moore Marriott (14 September 1885 – 11 December 1949) was an English character actor best remembered for the series of films he made with Will Hay. His first appearance with Hay was in the film Dandy Dick (1935), becoming a significant supporting performer in Hay's films from 1936 to 1940, during which time he played an elderly character called "Jeremiah Harbottle". Marriot had first played the Harbottle character in the 1920s, when the character was created by Hay for his "The Fourth Form at St. Michael's" stage and radio sketches (which were subsequently released on Columbia Records).

== Career ==
Marriott was born at Alpha Place, Yiewsley, Middlesex, on 14 September 1885, the son of George Matthew Marriott (1859–1940), who was then a commercial traveller, and his wife, Edith Rousby, née Coleman (1864–1946). His parents were actors, and his father became a theatrical manager. Moore Marriott made his stage debut at the age of five. He had originally intended to train as an architect, but instead he became an actor in films. Rather like Wilfrid Brambell and Clive Dunn later, he became typecast as playing old men when he was still relatively young. He had a special set of artificial teeth which he would put in to play his 'old man' characters. He had no teeth in real life and took four different sets of false teeth with him to achieve variety in his characters.

Although he made 131 film appearances from 1912, today he is best known as old "Harbottle" in a number of comedy films he made with Will Hay and Graham Moffatt, including Oh, Mr Porter! (1937), Ask a Policeman (1939), and as Jerry the Mole in Convict 99 (1938). It was during the filming of Hay's film Dandy Dick (1935) - where Marriott played an uncredited stableboy - that he first suggested that Hay should be a straight man to his old-man Harbottle character, a dynamic which was introduced the following year in Hay's 1936 film Windbag the Sailor along with Graham Moffatt.

Following the dissolution of the partnership with Will Hay, he continued to play his Harbottle-type character alongside Graham Moffatt in two films with the comedian Arthur Askey - namely I Thank You (1941) and Back-Room Boy (1942) - with a solo appearance as Jerry alongside the Crazy Gang in the 1941 movie Gasbags. His other film appearances included Millions Like Us (1943) and Green for Danger (1946).

== Death ==
In his later years, Marriott kept a grocer's store in Bognor Regis, and it is where he died on 11 December 1949; only eight months after the death of his comedy partner Will Hay. Cause of death was cardiac syncope, acute pulmonary oedema and chronic myocardiac degeneration caused by earlier pneumonia. He outlived his mother and his father by merely three years and nine years respectively. He was cremated at Golders Green Crematorium, where his ashes were also interred.

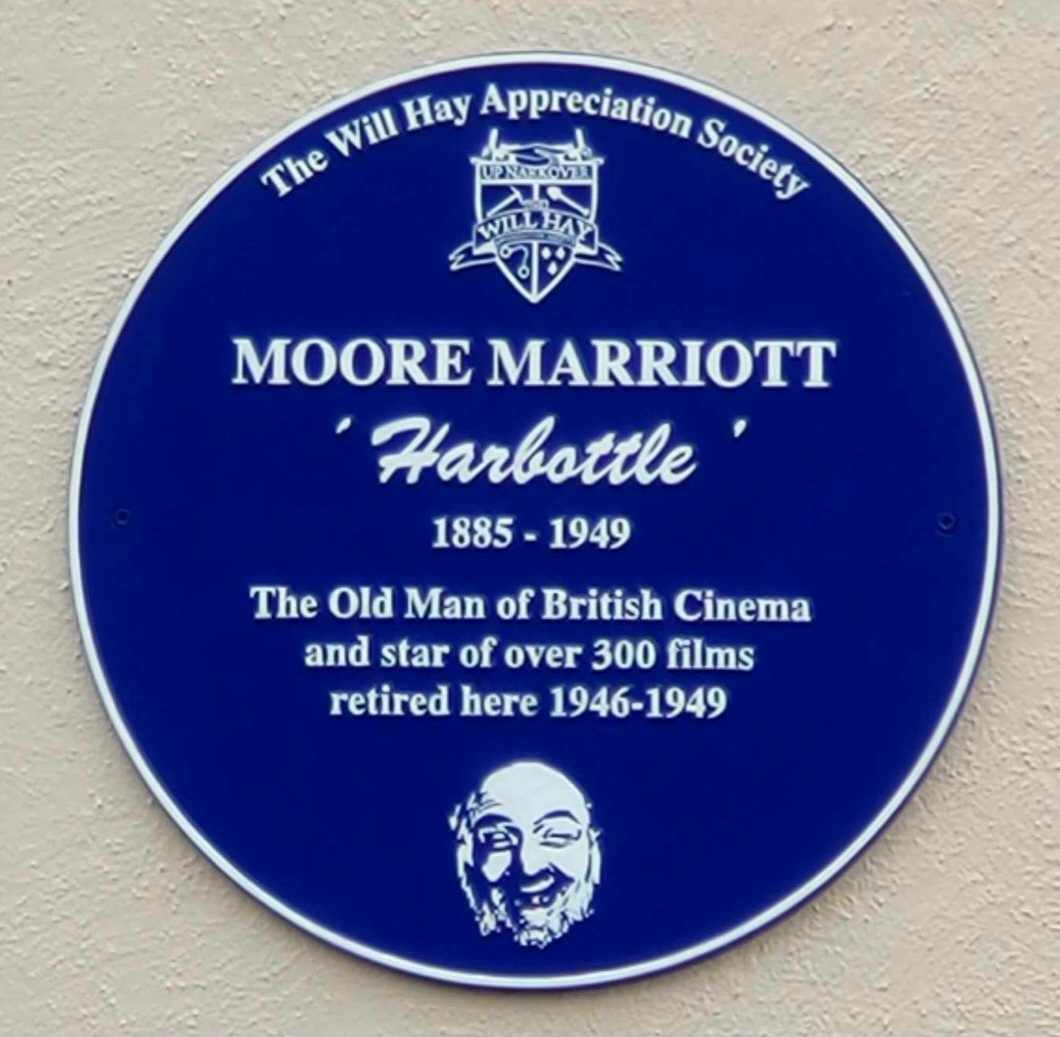
The Will Hay Appreciation Society's plaque honouring comic actor Moore Marriott at his home in Bognor Regis.

== Legacy ==
The Will Hay Appreciation Society was founded in 2009 by British artist Tom Marshall, and aims to preserve the legacy of Will Hay, Moore Marriott and Graham Moffatt and to bring their work to a new generation of fans. As of October 2023, the organisation had over 8000 members. The society unveiled a memorial bench to Will Hay, Moore Marriott and Graham Moffatt in October 2018, in Cliddesden, Hampshire the filming location for Oh, Mr. Porter!. The bench was unveiled by Pete Waterman.

On 14 September 2024, the 139th anniversary of Marriott's birth, the Will Hay Appreciation Society unveiled a memorial plaque to Moore Marriott on his final home in Bognor Regis. The plaque was unveiled by comic actor Bob Golding and the event was presented by society founder Tom Marshall.

== Selected filmography ==
- A Maid of the Alps (1912, Short)
- By the Shortest of Heads (1915, Short) - Capt. Fields
- Grim Justice (1916) - Grandfather Transom
- The Grip of Iron (1920) - Smiler
- Mary Latimer, Nun (1920) - Dickey Stubbs
- The Winding Road (1920) - Jed Sterrett
- Three Men in a Van (1921) - Mudley
- The Head of the Family (1922) - Mate
- The Monkey's Paw (1923) - John White
- Lawyer Quince (1924, Short) - Quince
- Dixon's Return (1924, Short) - Bob Dixon
- The Conspirators (1924) - Morris / Sydney Barnes
- The Mating of Marcus (1924) - Reverend Cheffins
- Ordeal by Golf (1924, Short) - Reverend Heeza Jones
- Not for Sale (1924) - Solicitor
- Afraid of Love (1925) - Father
- Confessions (1925) - Hardy
- King of the Castle (1925) - Peter Coffin
- The Gold Cure (1925) - Janbois
- Every Mother's Son (1926) - Nobby
- The Qualified Adventurer (1926) - Bosun
- London Love (1926) - Aaron Levinsky
- Passion Island (1927) - Beppo
- Second to None (1927) - Bill Hyde
- The Silver Lining (1927) - Gypsy
- Carry On (1927) - Mick Trevorn
- Huntingtower (1927) - Speidel
- Victory (1928) - Seth Lee
- Toni (1928) - Meyer
- Sweeney Todd (1928) - Sweeney Todd
- Widecombe Fair (1928) - Uncle Tom Cobleigh
- Kitty (1929) - Workman (uncredited)
- Mr. Smith Wakes Up (1929, Short) - Mr. Smith
- The Lady from the Sea (1929) - Old Roberts
- The Flying Scotsman (1929) - Bob White
- Kissing Cup's Race (1930) - Joe Tricker
- Aroma of the South Seas (1931, Short) - The King
- The Speckled Band (1931) - Member of Jury (uncredited)
- The Lyons Mail (1931) - Choppard
- Dance Pretty Lady (1931) - Mr. Raeburn
- Up for the Cup (1931) - James Hardcastle
- The Crooked Lady (1932) - Crabby
- The Water Gipsies (1932) - Mr. Pewtar
- Nine till Six (1932) - Doorman
- Mr. Bill the Conqueror (1932) - Tom Turtle
- The Sign of Four (1932) - Mordecai Smith (uncredited)
- Heroes of the Mine (1932) - Gaffer
- The Wonderful Story (1932) - Zacky Richards
- Little Waitress (1932) - Baron Halfsburg
- The Crime at Blossoms (1933) - Driver
- Money for Speed (1933) - Shorty
- A Moorland Tragedy (1933, Short) - The Old Man
- Dora (1933, Short) - Thomas Henry Jones
- The House of Trent (1933) - Ferrier
- Lucky Blaze (1933) - Sir James Benson
- Love's Old Sweet Song (1933) - Old Tom
- Hawleys of High Street (1933) - Mr. Busworth
- A Political Party (1934) - Jim Turner
- Faces (1934) - Robert Pelham
- Girls, Please! (1934) - Oldest Inhabitant
- Nell Gwyn (1934) - Robin
- The Scoop (1934) - Jim Stewart
- The Feathered Serpent (1934) - Harry Hugg
- Dandy Dick (1935) - Stableboy (uncredited)
- Drake of England (1935) - Bright
- The Man Without a Face (1935) - Tinker John
- Turn of the Tide (1935) - Tindal Fosdyck
- Gay Old Dog (1935) - George Bliss
- It's a Bet (1935) - Farmer (uncredited)
- When Knights Were Bold (1936) - The Tramp
- Strange Cargo (1936) - Captain Burch
- Wednesday's Luck (1936) - Nobby
- The Amazing Quest of Ernest Bliss (1936) - Edwards (uncredited)
- As You Like It (1936) - Denis (uncredited)
- Luck of the Turf (1936) - Mr. Jackson
- Talk of the Devil (1936) - Dart Thrower (uncredited)
- Accused (1936) - Dubec
- Windbag the Sailor (1936) - Jeremiah Harbottle
- Feather Your Nest (1937) - Mr. Jenkins
- Fifty-Shilling Boxer (1937) - Tim Regan
- The Fatal Hour (1937) - Dixon
- Night Ride (1937) - Miner (scenes deleted)
- Victoria the Great (1937) - Train Driver
- Oh, Mr Porter! (1937) - Jeremiah Harbottle
- Intimate Relations (1937) - Toomley
- Owd Bob (1938) - Samuel
- Held for Ransom (1938) - Hathaway
- Convict 99 (1938) - Jerry, The Mole
- Old Bones of the River (1938) - Jerry Harbottle
- A Girl Must Live (1939) - Bretherton Hythe
- Ask a Policeman (1939) - Harbottle
- Cheer Boys Cheer (1939) - Geordie
- Where's That Fire? (1939) - Jeremiah Harbottle
- The Frozen Limits (1939) - Tom Tiddler
- Band Waggon (1940) - Jasper
- Charley's (Big-Hearted) Aunt (1940) - Jerry
- Gasbags (1941) - Jerry Jenkins
- I Thank You (1941) - 'Pop' Bennett
- Hi Gang! (1941) - Uncle Jerry
- Back-Room Boy (1942) - Jerry (Jeremiah Percy Cecil Frobisher)
- Millions Like Us (1943) - Jim Crowson
- Time Flies (1944) - A Soothsayer
- It Happened One Sunday (1944) - Hospital Porter
- Don't Take It to Heart (1944) - Granfer
- A Place of One's Own (1945) - George
- I'll Be Your Sweetheart (1945) - George Le Brunn
- The Agitator (1945) - Ben Duckett
- Green for Danger (1946) - The Patients: Joseph Higgins
- The Root of All Evil (1947) - William Scholes
- Green Fingers (1947) - Pickles
- The Hills of Donegal (1947) - Old Jake
- The History of Mr. Polly (1949) - Uncle Pentstemon
- High Jinks in Society (1949) - Grandpa (final film role)
