= Graham Moffatt =

British comedy actor (1919–1965)

- Born: Graham Victor Harold Moffatt; 6 December 1919; Hammersmith, London, England
- Died: 2 July 1965 (aged 45); Bath, Somerset, England
- Occupations: Comedy actor and publican
- Spouse: Joyce Muriel Hazeldine (m. 1948)
- Children: Richard, Chris, Jayne

Graham Victor Harold Moffatt (6 December 1919 – 2 July 1965) was an English comedic character actor. He is best known for a number of black and white films where he appeared with Will Hay and Moore Marriott as 'Albert': a plump cheekily insolent street-savvy youth.

== Early life ==
Moffatt was born on 6 December 1919 in Hammersmith, West London, the son of Frederick Victor Moffatt (1896–1977) and Daisy Eleonora née Whiteside (1895–1969), both of whom outlived him. He had two sisters, Peggy (1922-2006), and Rita Doreen Moffatt (1936–1991). He was born exactly 31 years after Will Hay, with whom Moffatt would perform with in a string of successful cinema films in the 1930s. He wanted to act from an early age. He first worked as a call boy at Shepherd's Bush Studios, and often saw actor Tom Walls going in and out of the sound stages. Walls took a liking to Moffatt, and chose him for a bit part in the 1934 film A Cup of Kindness. He then gave up his job as a call boy, and went on to appear in five more films in minor, mostly uncredited roles before getting his big break in Will Hay's films.

== Cinema career ==
His first film with Will Hay was Where There's a Will (1936) in which he plays an office boy. In his next film with Hay, Windbag the Sailor (1936), he is joined by Moore Marriott and his character has become 'Albert'. He is known by this name in all his later films with Hay and Marriott: Oh, Mr Porter! (1937), Old Bones of the River (1938), Convict 99 (1938), Ask a Policeman (1939) and Where's That Fire? (1940). Still as Albert, he appeared again with Moore Marriott in a series of films starring Arthur Askey: Charley's (Big-Hearted) Aunt (1940), I Thank You (1941), and Back Room Boy (1942). His later films include Powell and Pressburger's A Canterbury Tale and I Know Where I'm Going!.

== Post-acting life ==
In the mid-1940s he semi-retired from show business to become a publican with his wife, Joyce Muriel Hazeldine, whom he married in June 1948 and remained married to for 17 years until his death in July 1965. Together, they ran the Swan Inn at Braybrooke (near Market Harborough), followed by the Englishcombe Inn at Bath. Whilst landlord of the Swan Inn, Moffatt became good friends with local musician and actor Jim Dale who would often drink at the pub.

In March 1952 he was admitted to hospital in Kettering after two weeks of hiccuping. He still made sporadic cinema film appearances in minor parts, the last being in the 1963 film 80,000 Suspects, directed by Val Guest, who was a writer of many of the films that Moffatt starred in with Will Hay and Moore Marriott.

== Personal life and death ==
Moffatt married Joyce Muriel Hazeldine in 1948. He died on 2 July 1965 in Bath, Somerset from heart failure at the early age of 45. His ashes were scattered in the English Channel at the village of Beer in Devon. He is survived by his three children Richard, Jayne and Chris.

== Tributes ==
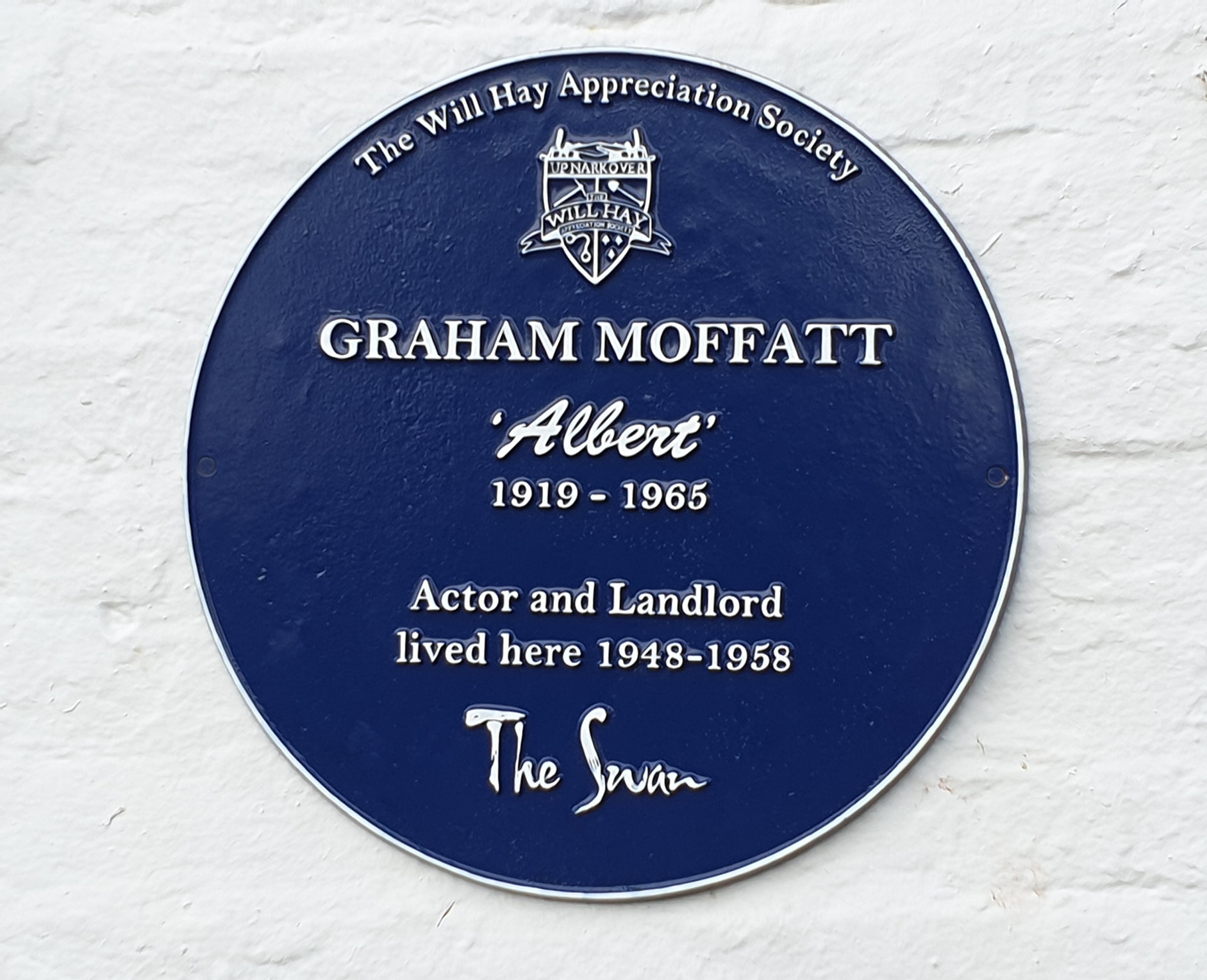
The Will Hay Appreciation Society's plaque commemorating Graham Moffatt, best known as 'Albert'.

The Will Hay Appreciation Society was founded in 2009 by British artist Tom Marshall, and aims to preserve the legacy of Will Hay, Moore Marriott and Graham Moffatt and to bring their work to a new generation of fans. As of June 2019, the organisation has over 4200 members. The Will Hay Appreciation Society unveiled a memorial bench to Will Hay, Moore Marriott and Graham Moffatt in October 2018, in Cliddesden, Hampshire the filming location for Oh, Mr. Porter!. The bench was unveiled by Pete Waterman.

Moffatt's life story was made into a short film by The Will Hay Appreciation Society which features interviews from his three children, Richard, Chris and Jayne. The film is called Graham Moffatt: Britain's Favourite Fat Boy.

On 18 August 2019 The Will Hay Appreciation Society unveiled a plaque commemorating Graham Moffatt at one of the pubs he was landlord at, the Swan Inn, Braybrooke. The unveiling was attended by his children, members of the society and local villagers.

== Filmography ==
- A Cup of Kindness (1934) - Choirboy (uncredited)
- The Clairvoyant (1935) - Page Boy (uncredited)
- Stormy Weather (1935) - Office Boy (uncredited)
- All In (1936)
- It's Love Again (1936) - Callboy (uncredited)
- Where There's a Will (1936) - Willie, The Office Boy
- Windbag the Sailor (1936) - Albert Brown
- Good Morning, Boys (1937) - Albert Brown
- O-Kay for Sound (1937) - Albert, the page boy
- Gangway (1937) - Joe
- Doctor Syn (1937) - Jerry Jerk
- Oh, Mr Porter! (1937) - Albert
- Owd Bob (1938) - Tammas
- Convict 99 (1938) - Albert Brown
- Old Bones of the River (1938) - Albert Brown
- Ask a Policeman (1939) - Constable Albert Brown
- Cheer Boys Cheer (1939) - Albert
- Where's That Fire? (1940) - Albert Brown
- Charley's (Big-Hearted) Aunt (1940) - Albert Brown
- I Thank You (1941) - Albert
- Hi Gang! (1941) - Albert Tomlin
- Back-Room Boy (1942) - Albert
- The True Story of King Alfred (1943)
- Dear Octopus (1943) - Fred the Chauffeur
- Time Flies (1944) - His Nephew
- A Canterbury Tale (1944) - Sergt. 'Stuffy'
- Welcome, Mr. Washington (1944) - Albert Brown
- I Know Where I'm Going! (1945) - R.A.F. Sergeant
- Lost in the Wash (1946)
- Ghostesses (1946)
- All's Fair (1946)
- Cottage Pie (1946)
- A Smashing Job (1946)
- Stamp Ramp (1946)
- The Voyage of Peter Joe (1946) - Albert Brown
- Stage Frights (1947)
- Robbers Return (1947)
- Woman Hater (1948) - Fat Boy
- Cuckoo College (1949, TV film) - Pupil
- Three Bags Full (1949)
- The Second Mate (1950) - Paddy
- The Dragon of Pendragon Castle (1950) - Paddy
- Mother Riley Meets the Vampire (1952) - The Yokel
- Inn for Trouble (1960) - Jumbo Gudge
- 80,000 Suspects (1963) - Fat Man in Vaccination Line (uncredited) (final film role)
- Graham Moffatt: Britain's Favourite Fat Boy (2018 documentary) - Himself
