= Leave It to Smith =

1933 film

- Directed by: Tom Walls
- Written by: J. O. C. Orton
- Based on: Never Come Back by Frederick Lonsdale
- Produced by: Michael Balcon
- Starring: Tom Walls; Carol Goodner; Anne Grey
- Cinematography: Leslie Rowson
- Music by: Louis Levy
- Production company: Gaumont British Picture Corporation
- Distributed by: Woolf and Freedman
- Release date: 13 September 1933
- Running time: 74 minutes
- Country: United Kingdom
- Language: English

Leave It to Smith is a 1933 British comedy film directed by and starring Tom Walls. It also featured Carol Goodner, Anne Grey, Peter Gawthorne and Basil Radford. It is also known as Just Smith.

The film was based on a play by Frederick Lonsdale and produced by Michael Balcon. It was made at the Lime Grove Studios with sets by the German art director Alfred Junge.

== Cast ==
- Tom Walls as Smith
- Carol Goodner as Mary Linkley
- Anne Grey as Lady Moynton
- Allan Aynesworth as Lord Trench
- Eva Moore as Lady Trench
- Reginald Gardiner as Lord Redwood
- Veronica Rose as Lady Redwood
- Hartley Power as John Mortimer
- Basil Radford as Sir John Moynton
- Peter Gawthorne as Rolls
- Leslie Perrins as Duke of Bristol

== Bibliography ==
- Low, Rachael. Filmmaking in 1930s Britain. George Allen & Unwin, 1985.
- Wood, Linda. British Films, 1927-1939. British Film Institute, 1986.
