= Where There's a Will (1936 film) =

1936 British film by William Beaudine

- Trade advertisement
- Directed by: William Beaudine
- Written by: Robert Edmunds; Will Hay; William Beaudine; Leslie Arliss and Sidney Gilliat (story)
- Produced by: Michael Balcon
- Starring: Will Hay; H. F. Maltby; Graham Moffatt; Norma Varden
- Cinematography: Charles Van Enger
- Edited by: Terence Fisher
- Music by: Bretton Byrd
- Distributed by: Gainsborough Pictures
- Release date: 10 August 1936
- Running time: 80 minutes
- Country: United Kingdom
- Language: English

Where There's a Will is a 1936 British comedy film directed by William Beaudine and starring Will Hay, Graham Moffatt and Norma Varden. It was written by Robert Edmunds, Hay and Beaudine from a story by Leslie Arliss and Sidney Gilliat.

The film marked the first appearance of Graham Moffatt in a Will Hay film.

== Plot ==
Benjamin Stubbins is a penniless, bungling solicitor who arrives at his office to find his insolent office boy with his feet up on the desk, reading a wild west magazine, that Hay confiscates so that he can read it later.

Stubbins later takes a job from a group of Americans who claim they want him to track down some ancestors of theirs in Scotland. In reality, however, they want to use his office so they can rob a safe in the room immediately below his office. Stubbins takes the job (which is designed to keep him out of the office).

In the end Stubbins realises his mistake and at a Christmas Eve fancy dress party he informs a group of carol singing policeman about the Americans’ nefarious activities.

== Cast ==
- Will Hay as Benjamin Stubbins
- Graham Moffatt as Willie the office boy
- Norma Varden as Lady Margaret Wimpleton
- Hartley Power as Duke Wilson
- Gina Malo as Goldie Kelly
- H. F. Maltby as Sir Roger Wimpleton
- Peggy Simpson as Barbara Stubbins
- Gibb McLaughlin as Martin
- Eddie Houghton as 'Slug'
- Hal Waters as 'Nick'
- John Turnbull as Detective Collins
- Sybil Brooke as the landlady
- Davina Craig as 'Lucie'
- Mickey Brantford as 'Jimmy'
- Henry Adnes as the pawnbroker
- Frederick Piper as fingerprint expert

== Production ==
It was an early film from producer Ted Black who would make many of Hay's classic films.

== Reception ==
The Monthly Film Bulletin wrote: "The story is obviously not meant to be taken seriously. It is, in its development, curiously naive in parts, but has some new and effective comic gags and twists. It is put over swiftly and amusingly. There is abundance of action and the dialogue is crisp. It is a good vehicle for the star's particular brand of humour and characterisation. Will Hay works untiringly, with excellent results. He is most effectively supported by a thoroughly competent cast. Director, actors, and technicians have done a good piece of work which reflects credit on all concerned."

Kine Weekly wrote: "Riotous slapstick farcical comedy built with shrewd showmanship to exploit the inimitable humour of the English screen's prime minister of mirth, the one and only Will Hay. The plot, written with unblushing condescension to the gallery, is crazy enough to ply the star with a swift succession of really bright situations, and he, unobtrusively supported by a versatile and numerically strong cast, puts them over with laughter-provoking infallibility."

The Daily Film Renter wrote: "Will Hay this time lays aside his mortar-board and cane for the wig and gown of briefless barristerdom, a metamorphosis that does not, however, affect the homely human humour that is his principal stock in trade. Through all his current vicissitudes he remains very much the bewildered headmaster of the music halls, facing fantastic adventures over a pair of pince-nez, although he is the butt for a band of American gangsters instead of the unruly pupils who customarily make his life unbearable in the cause of cntertainment."

Picture Show wrote: "A really first-class supporting cast, expert direction which keeps the film moving at an agreeable speed, amusing dialogue and situations all help to make this a good British comedy."
