= Button's Mill, Diss =

Windmill in Diss, Norfolk, England

Diss Windmill
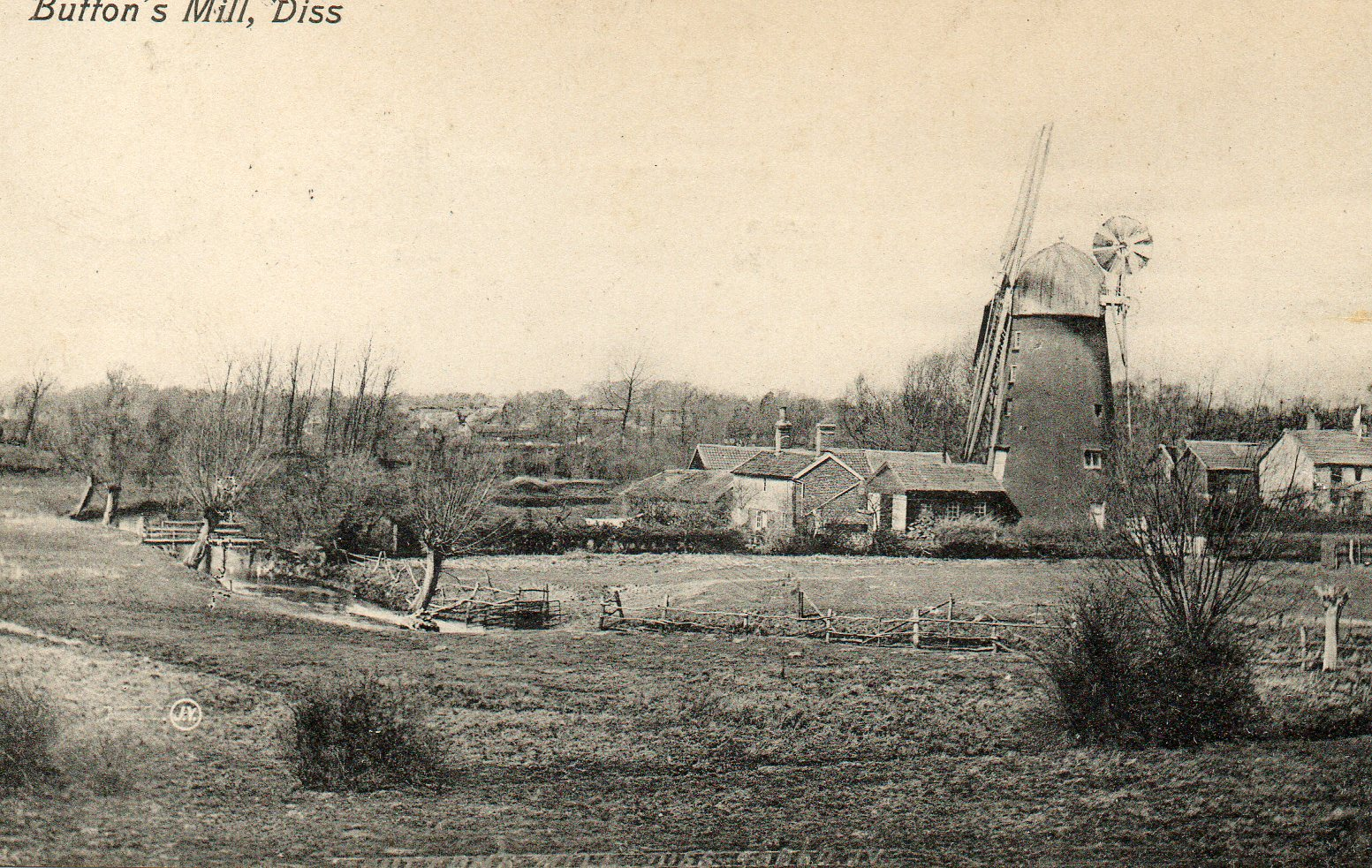
- Button's Mill, c1911
- Interactive map of Diss Windmill

Origin
- Mill name: Jays Mill; Button's Mill; Victoria Road Mill
- Mill location: TM123792
- Coordinates: 52.36995°N 1.1180352°E
- Operator: Private
- Year built: c1817

Information
- Purpose: Corn
- Type: Tower mill
- Storeys: Six storeys
- No. of sails: Four sails
- Type of sails: Double Patent sails
- Windshaft: Cast iron
- Winding: Fantail
- Fantail blades: Eight blades
- Auxiliary power: Steam engine, later replaced by an oil engine
- No. of pairs of millstones: Three pairs (1853); Four pairs (1880)
- Size of millstones: Two pairs 5 feet (1.52 m) diameter, one pair 4 feet (1.22 m) diameter (1853); Four pairs 4 feet (1.22 m) diameter (1880).

Jay's Mill, Button's Mill or Victoria Road Mill is a tower mill at Diss, Norfolk, England which has been truncated and converted to residential accommodation.

== History ==
Button's Mill was built c1817 on what was then Diss Common for Thomas Jay who had purchased the land that the mill was built on in that year. Jay also owned a post mill at Stuston Road. The mill was built with eight sails, but these were blown off on 28 November 1836. Jay's post mill at Stuston Road had been blown down in a gale four days earlier. The tower mill was repaired by millwright Henry Rush, but now only sported four sails; a replacement post mill was also built.

Thomas Jay died on 3 April 1847 and the mill was run by his widow Sarah. It was offered for sale by auction on 5 September 1853 at the King's Head Hotel, Diss but remained unsold. It was again offered for sale October in 1856 and purchased by Michael Hawes. He was succeeded by William Hawes who retired in 1880. The mill was sold by auction at the Kings Head Hotel and bought by John Button. Button had worked various post mills around Diss and been in business for 24 years at that time. A steam engine had been installed as auxiliary power by this date. In 1892, roller milling equipment was added. The steam engine was later replaced by an oil engine.

A sail was lost in 1928, by which time the mill was being worked by John B Button. The mill worked on a single pair of sails until 1929 when the fantail was damaged. The remaining pair of sails, which had previously been on Mount Pleasant Mill, Framlingham, Suffolk, were sold c1936 and found further use at Terling Mill, Essex. They were transported to Terling by rail and completed their journey by horse and cart. The cap was removed and the mill truncated by one storey. It was then used as part of a saw mill. In 1968, the mill was purchased and converted to residential accommodation.

== Description ==
Button's Mill was a six-storey tower mill with a domed cap which was winded by a fantail. It was built with eight sails but rebuilt with four double Patent sails in 1837. The sails had a span of 66 feet (20.12 m) and were 9 feet (2.74 m) wide. They were carried on a cast-iron windshaft. The wooden brake wheel was 11 feet 6 inches (3.51 m) diameter, with iron segment teeth. The four pairs of French Burr millstones were driven overdrift.

== Millers ==
- Thomas Jay 1817-1847
- Sarah Jay 1847-56
- William Michael Hawes 1856-80
- John Button 1880-83
- John & William Edward Button 1883-1922
- John B Button -1929

Reference for above:-
