= M'lita Dolores =

M'lita Dolores was born Mary Poole in Mollart Street, Hanley (Stoke-on-Trent) in 1890, and was an accomplished roller skater, trick cyclist, speciality dancer, and comedian. She had a varied career in Variety as a noted character actress, child impersonator, and later made her name in broadcasting. Her big break came when she won a talent contest at the Imperial concert hall, Glass Street (later used as a skating rink), and went on to become a household name in between two world wars.

== Career ==
It was as M'lita Dolores that she became one of the brightest music hall stars of the West End in the 1920s before ending her career in Malta as a radio personality in the 1950s and 1960s.

== Notes and references ==
1. M'Lita's star shone bright - Article from: The Sentinel (Stoke-on-Trent UK) Article date: April 19, 2008.
