= Oh, Mr Porter! =

- (left to right) Graham Moffatt as Albert, Moore Marriott as Harbottle, and Will Hay as William Porter
- Directed by: Marcel Varnel
- Written by: J. O. C. Orton; Marriott Edgar; Val Guest
- Based on: story by Frank Launder; Arnold Ridley (play)
- Produced by: Edward Black
- Starring: Will Hay; Graham Moffatt; Moore Marriott
- Cinematography: Arthur Crabtree
- Edited by: R. E. Dearing; Alfred Roome
- Music by: Louis Levy; Jack Beaver
- Distributed by: Gainsborough Pictures
- Release date: 5 October 1937
- Running time: 85 minutes
- Country: United Kingdom
- Language: English

Oh, Mr Porter! is a 1937 British comedy film starring Will Hay with Moore Marriott and Graham Moffatt and directed by Marcel Varnel. While not Hay's commercially most successful (although it grossed £500,000 at the box office – equal to about £34,000,000 at 2020 value), it is his best-known film to modern audiences. It is widely acclaimed as the best of Hay's work, and a classic of its genre. The film had its first public showing in November 1937 and went on general release on 3 January 1938. The plot of Oh, Mr Porter was loosely based on the Arnold Ridley play The Ghost Train. The title was taken from Oh! Mr Porter, a music hall song.

== Plot ==
After he messes up his job as wheeltapper, inept railway worker William Porter is, through family connections, given the job of station master at a remote and ramshackle Northern Irish railway station on the border with the then Irish Free State.

Porter's co-workers are the elderly deputy station master, Harbottle, and the insolent young porter, Albert, who make a living by stealing goods in transit and swapping railway tickets for food. They regale Porter with tales of the deaths and disappearances of previous station masters – each apparently the victim of the ghost of One-Eyed Joe the Miller.

On his first morning Porter is awoken by a cow sticking its head through the window of the old railway carriage in which he is sleeping. The cow has been stolen in transit and is being milked by Harbottle, and the team's breakfast consists of bacon made from a litter of piglets which they are supposed to be looking after for a local farmer.

Station master Porter tries to renovate the station by painting it, and decides to organise an excursion for the locals. A fight breaks out in the pub as the locals argue about where the excursion should go. Porter escapes to the landlord's rooms, where he meets a one-eyed man who introduces himself as Joe. Joe offers to buy all of the tickets for an away game that the village football team are playing the following day.

Porter has actually unknowingly agreed to transport a group of criminal gun runners to the Irish Free State. Although Porter questions some of the odd packages being loaded onto the train, he accepts Joe's claim that these are goalposts for the game.

The train disappears as the smugglers divert it down a disused branch line near the border. After Porter loses his job due to the misunderstanding he decides to track down the errant engine.

The trio find the missing train in a derelict railway tunnel, underneath a supposedly haunted windmill. They are captured by the gun runners, and escape by climbing up the windmill and then climbing down the sails. They couple the criminals' carriages to their own engine, Gladstone, and carry them away from the border at full speed, keeping up steam by burning everything from Harbottle's underwear to the level crossing gates they smash through. Albert climbs on top of the carriage and hits anyone who sticks their head out with a large shovel.

Porter writes a note and places it in Harbottle's 'medicine' bottle. He throws it through the window of the station master's office when they pass a large station, alerting the authorities. The entire railway goes into action, closing lines and re-routing trains until Gladstone can crash into a siding where the gun runners are arrested by waiting police.

Afterwards, there is a celebration in which Harbottle points out that Gladstone is ninety years old, and Porter claims it is good for another ninety, at which point the engine explodes. Porter, Harbottle and Albert lower their hats in respect.

== Cast ==
- Will Hay as William Porter
- Moore Marriott as Jeremiah Harbottle
- Graham Moffatt as Albert Brown
- Percy Walsh as Superintendent
- Dave O'Toole as Postman
- Sebastian Smith as Mr. Trimbletow
- Agnes Lauchlan as Mrs. Trimbletow
- Dennis Wyndham as Grogan / "One-Eyed Joe"
- Frederick Piper as Ledbetter
- Frederick Lloyd as Minister
- Frank Atkinson as Irishman In Bar
- Betty Jardine as Secretary

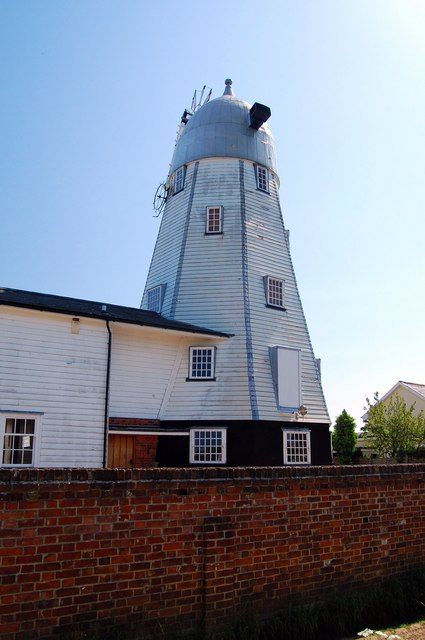
Terling Windmill where the windmill scene was filmed

== Production ==
The movie was one of several comedies Hay made at Gainsborough under Ted Black.

Despite the majority of the film being set in Northern Ireland, none of the filming took place there; the railway station at Buggleskelly was the disused Cliddesden railway station on the Basingstoke and Alton Light Railway, which had closed to goods in 1936. Oh, Mr Porter! was filmed at Cliddesden between May and July 1937. All the interior shots were made at Gainsborough Studios, Shepherds Bush, during the August. The windmill in which Porter and his colleagues are trapped is located at Terling, Essex, and "Gladstone", the ancient steam locomotive, was portrayed by No. 2 Northiam 2-4-0T built by Hawthorn Leslie in 1899 and loaned by the Kent and East Sussex Railway to the film. The engine was returned to the company after completion of the film and remained in service until 1941, when it was scrapped.

The title sequence uses scenes shot at a variety of locations on the Waterloo to Southampton railway line and also between Maze Hill and Greenwich in south-east London. The scene in which Porter travels to Buggleskelly by bus, while being warned of a terrible danger by locals, parodies that of the Tod Browning film, Dracula (1931).

The Southern Railway of Northern Ireland that Porter works for is fictitious. In reality, from the route chosen on the map, the line would have belonged to the Great Northern Railway (Ireland), with Buggleskelly being close to the real town of Lisnaskea. In addition, the Irish border on the map portrayed in the film is inaccurate, placing the border too far east, and roughly along the eastern coast of Lough Erne rather than the border of County Fermanagh.

== Reception ==
Kinematograph Weekly reported the film as a "winner" at the British box office in January 1938.

The film has been very well received over time.

The British Film Institute included the film in its 360 Classic Feature Films list; Variety magazine described the movie as "amusing, if over-long", noting that there was "[n]o love interest to mar the comedy"; and the cult website TV Cream listed it at number 41 in its list of cinema's Top 100 Films.

The film critic Barry Norman included it among his 100 best films of all time, and fellow critic Derek Malcolm also included the film in his Century of Films, describing it as "perfectly representing a certain type of bumbling British humour", despite being directed by a Parisian director.

The director Marcel Varnel considered the film as among his best work, and it was described in 2006, by The Times in its obituary for writer Val Guest, as "a comic masterpiece of the British cinema". Jimmy Perry, in his autobiography, wrote that the trio of Captain Mainwaring, Corporal Jones and Private Pike in Dad's Army was inspired by watching Oh, Mr Porter!

== Legacy ==
The Will Hay Appreciation Society unveiled a memorial bench to Will Hay, Moore Marriott and Graham Moffatt in October 2018, in Cliddesden, Hampshire, the filming location for Buggleskelly. The bench was unveiled by Pete Waterman.

== Reviews ==
=== Modern reviews ===
- "Archive of Channel 4 Review (UK)". Archived from the original on 29 August 2005.
- Spinning Image Review
- Bootleg Files Review
- "Oh, Mr Porter! (1937)". BFI Screenonline. Archived from the original on 7 September 2009.

=== Contemporary reviews ===
- Variety Magazine Review, 1937
- "BFI Monthly Film Bulletin Review". BFI Screenonline. October 1937. Archived from the original on 7 September 2009.

== Parody ==
The film was parodied in the Harry Enfield spoof documentary Norbert Smith - a Life, as Oh, Mr Bank Robber! starring "Will Silly".
