= Windbag the Sailor =

1937 film by William Beaudine

- Opening titles
- Directed by: William Beaudine
- Written by: Stafford Dickens; George Edgar; Marriott Edgar; Will Hay
- Produced by: Michael Balcon
- Starring: Will Hay; Moore Marriott; Graham Moffatt
- Cinematography: Jack E. Cox
- Edited by: R. E. Dearing; Terence Fisher
- Music by: Charles Williams
- Distributed by: Gainsborough Pictures
- Release date: December 1936
- Running time: 87 minutes
- Country: United Kingdom
- Language: English

Windbag the Sailor is a 1936 British comedy film directed by William Beaudine and starring Will Hay, Moore Marriott and Graham Moffatt. It was written by Stafford Dickens, George Edgar, Marriott Edgar and Hay.

The film marked the first appearance of Hay with Moffatt and Marriott acting as his straight men.

== Plot ==
Ben Cutlet is a retired barge captain who entertains his bar room audience with tales of his alleged days at sea, although his maritime experience extends no further than navigating a coal barge. His tall tales catch him out when he is conned into commanding the unseaworthy Rob Roy to the West Indies by a gang of criminals who mean to scuttle the ship for the insurance money. Cutlet gets the upper hand however when he and his companions fall in with West Indian natives who mistake their radio set for a god.

== Cast ==
- Will Hay as Captain Ben Cutlet
- Moore Marriott as Jerry Harbottle
- Graham Moffatt as Albert Brown
- Norma Varden as Olivia Potter-Porter
- Kenneth Warrington as Yates
- Dennis Wyndham as Jim Maryatt
- Amy Veness as Emma Harbottle
- Leonard Sharp as crew member

== Reception ==
Writing for The Spectator in 1937, Graham Greene gave the film a good review, recommending it to "those under sixteen". Greene praised Beaudine for his "admirabl[e] direct[ion]", and noted that Hay "has never had a better part than that of Captain Ben Cutlett".

The Monthly Film Bulletin wrote: "The story though not strong and rather slowly developed is an excellent vehicle – and a new one – for Will Hay's particular kind of humour and fooling and he is in good form. The rest of the cast feed and support the star to good effect. The technical qualities are well up to standard."

Kine Weekly wrote: "The story is hardly strong enough to permit of fast or furious humour, but there are more than enough bright and spectacular gags to coax laughter from the masses. The star is in good form, so are the supporting players, and the atmosphere is refreshingly 'seaworthy'."

The Daily Film Renter wrote: "Put over with lashings of broad humour, action roams authentic high seas ... Amusing dialogue, deft skit on Mutiny on the Bounty, and funster's amateur navigation involving destruction of pier, supply added hilarity. Reliable popular entertainment, particularly for Will Hay fans."
