= J. O. C. Orton =

British screenwriter (1889–1962)

- Born: 30 August 1889 St. John's Wood, London, England
- Died: May 1962 (age 72) London, England
- Occupation: Screenwriter
- Language: English

Captain John Overton Cone Orton MC (30 August 1889 – May 1962) was a British screenwriter.

== Early life and military service ==
Orton was born in St. John's Wood, London in 1889 and lived in Larchmont, New York, USA for a brief period of his childhood. In 1909 he joined the Norfolk Regiment of the British Army. In 1918 Orton was awarded with the Military Cross, and was included in the 1919 Birthday Honours when he was awarded the Air Force Cross.

== Film career ==
He was a head of the story department for Gaumont-British and was known for writing comedy scripts for such stars as Will Hay, Jack Hulbert and Arthur Askey. He also wrote various dramas and directed five movies. His final credit was as co-writer of fellow Gaumont alum Alfred Hitchcock's short war propaganda film Bon Voyage.

Val Guest called him "a charming, rather boring, fellow – there was nothing wrong with him, he wasn’t a very creative person unless he’d sold a story and came to work on the thing, but we never sat on a story with Joc and wrote...He was an ideas man, but not a very good one. They would sometimes say to Joc Orton, how he got his credits was, they’d say while we were working on something, Ted would call him or Frank “See if you can get something on the bus service, someone running a pirate bus” and Joc would go away and write a treatment, and the treatment when it came down to us, if it was one for us, … we would read it and say, “Yes its an idea, but that’s fucking awful and that needs more, and Ted would say “Kick it around.”, and we would take the script from there. And do the rewrites. Joc mostly did treatments of ideas they flung at him."

== Select credits ==
- Windjammer (1930)
- Creeping Shadows (1931)
- After the Ball (1932)
- Leave It to Smith (1933)
- Soldiers of the King (1933)
- Brown on Resolution (1935)
- Bulldog Jack (1935)
- Turn of the Tide (1935)
- The Flying Doctor (1936) - also editor
- Jack of All Trades (1936)
- Everything Is Thunder (1936)
- Non-Stop New York (1937)
- Oh, Mr Porter! (1937)
- Mr. Satan (1938)
- It's in the Blood (1938)
- Many Tanks Mr. Atkins (1938)
- Inspector Hornleigh Goes To It (1941)
- Cottage to Let (1941)
- Hi Gang! (1941)
- For Those in Peril (1944)
- Bon Voyage (1944)
