= Will Hay =

English comedian, actor, and film director (1888–1949)

Will Hay FRAS
- Hay in The Ghost of St. Michael's (1941)
- Born: William Thomson Hay; 6 December 1888; Stockton-on-Tees, County Durham, England
- Died: 18 April 1949 (aged 60); Chelsea, London, England
- Occupations: Comedian, actor, film director, amateur astronomer
- Years active: 1909–1945
- Spouse: Gladys Perkins (m. 1907; sep. 1935)
- Partner: Randi Kopstad
- Children: 3

William Thomson Hay FRAS (6 December 1888 – 18 April 1949) was an English comedian best known for playing authority figures with comic failings in several films, most notably as a schoolmaster. His film Oh, Mr Porter! (1937), made by Gainsborough Pictures, is often cited as the supreme British-produced film-comedy, and in 1938 he was the third highest-grossing star in the UK. Many comedians have acknowledged him as a major influence. Hay was also a keen amateur astronomer.

== Early life ==
Hay was born at 23 Durham Street in Stockton-on-Tees, County Durham, one of the five children (two sons and three daughters) of William Robert Hay (1859–1920) and his wife, Elizabeth (1859–1910) (née Ebden). The family moved to Lowestoft in Suffolk when he was less than a year old. By his late teens, Hay had become fluent in Italian, French and German and secured employment as an interpreter.

== Career ==
=== Early career ===
Will Hay decided to become an actor at the age of 21 after watching W. C. Fields perform a juggling act in Manchester. His first professional job came with a contract at a theatre in Belper, and in 1910 he first performed his schoolmaster character, which he based on a colleague of his sister (a teaching mistress). Initially played in drag as a schoolmistress, the character was later transferred to a headmaster. In the early years of the twentieth century, he experienced some moderate success as a stand-up comedian and an after-dinner speaker, and in 1914 he began working with the impresario Fred Karno—who had previously helped Stan Laurel and Charlie Chaplin achieve success—remaining with him for four years.

The schoolmaster sketch developed into a routine known as "The Fourth Form at St. Michael's", which Hay toured internationally throughout the 1920s, appearing in the United States, Canada, Australia and South Africa—where in 1928 he taught himself to count to five in Afrikaans. His wife Gladys often played a schoolboy or the character Harbottle in his sketches. The Harbottle character—a dim-witted, nearly deaf old man who is still in school because of his backwardness—was one of the most appreciated in Hay's act. The character was later portrayed in Hay's films by Moore Marriott. In a 1976 interview, Val Guest, who was a screenwriter for many of Hay's films, recalled transposing Harbottle from school into other everyday situations. Hay famously performed the schoolmaster routine at the 1925 Royal Command Performance before King George V and Queen Mary.

Following his 1925 Royal Command Performance, Hay embarked on his tour of the United States. After making some adjustments to his material to suit American audiences, the tour was highly successful. Returning to England, his popularity continued to grow, and he became a favourite of Edward, Prince of Wales, who frequently invited Hay to entertain at private gatherings at Windsor Castle. In 1931, Hay was elected "King Rat" of the Grand Order of Water Rats, an exclusive and highly prestigious showbusiness charity organisation, which cemented his high status and respect among his entertainment peers. In 1933, a year before making his feature-length debut, Hay starred in a short Pathé comedy film titled Know Your Apples.

In early March 1934 Hay published a short article in Film Weekly called "How I Make You Laugh", arguing that we laugh at comic mishap because we briefly identify with the misfortune of the performer, fear the mishap is about to strike us, and then feel relief when it does not. He was about to put that theory into practice on screen. It would prove to be a fitting statement of intent, as later that month his first sound film, Those Were the Days, had its trade show—an industry advance screening for cinema owners. It had a Royal Gala Premiere at the Prince Edward Theatre on 7 June and was warmly received; The Empire News remarked that Hay "creates celluloid laughs so easily that one wonders why he has been neglected by our film chiefs so long". The film reached general release in October 1934.

From 1934 to 1943, Hay was a prolific film star in Britain and ranked as the third highest-grossing star at the British box office in 1938, behind George Formby and Gracie Fields. He is widely regarded as one of the most prolific and influential British comedians of all time.

Hay worked with Gainsborough Pictures from 1935 to 1940, during which time he developed a partnership with Graham Moffatt, playing an insolent overweight schoolboy, and Moore Marriott as a toothless old man. Hay's 1937 film, with Moffatt and Marriott, Oh, Mr Porter! was described by The Times as "a comic masterpiece of the British cinema", while the writer Jimmy Perry cited the film as an influence on key character development for Dad's Army.

Hay often portrayed incompetent authority figures who attempt to conceal their incompetence but whose true traits are gradually exposed. As well as being incompetent, his characters are often immoral; for example, a clergyman involved in horse betting in Dandy Dick, a fraudster who lies about his career as a distinguished sea captain in Windbag the Sailor, and a prison warden, Dr Benjamin Twist, in Convict 99, who obtains his job under false pretences. He is often compared to W. C. Fields, who typically portrayed characters similar to those of Hay, being misanthropic, self-centered scoundrels who nevertheless remain sympathetic.

=== Elstree Studios ===
Hay had become interested in film making while touring in the United States in the 1920s, although, at the time he doubted he had a future in this field. Having returned to Britain, Hay started work at Elstree Studios in 1934 where he made three films, Those Were the Days, Radio Parade of 1935 and Dandy Dick.

=== Gainsborough Pictures ===
Hay's work at Gainsborough was his most successful, and established his reputation as a great comic actor. During this period he became one of the most prolific film stars in Britain. On three occasions, British film exhibitors voted him among the top ten box office stars in an annual poll run by the Motion Picture Herald. He was ranked 8th in 1936, 4th in 1937 and 3rd in 1938. He particularly thrived under the studio management of Ted Black.

His first film for the studio was Boys Will Be Boys, with the screenplay written by Hay himself. The movie's satire on the public school system was loosely based on the Narkover vein of humour in the work of Daily Express columnist, Beachcomber. Hay's film was widely seen as subversive towards authority, and it was granted an 'A' (adult) certificate by the British Board of Film Classification. Boys Will Be Boys is widely regarded as Hay's break-out film. Writing for The Spectator, Graham Greene described the film as "very amusing", and Hay's portrayal of Dr Smart as "competent", though Greene thought Claude Dampier's portrayal of Second Master Finch (Hay's adversary) was the film's "finest performance". Many years later, the Radio Times Guide to Films gave Boys Will Be Boys three stars out of five, observing that the film contains "the blend of bluster and dishonesty that makes his films irresistible".

During his time with Gainsborough Hay worked with Marcel Varnel, Val Guest, Charles Hawtrey, and Marriott Edgar, as well as Moore Marriott and Graham Moffatt, who were Hay's straight men in a number of his films. Moffatt played Albert, the overweight, insolent schoolboy reminiscent of Billy Bunter, while Marriott was the toothless old Harbottle. The trio appeared in six films together between 1936 and 1940, Windbag the Sailor, Oh, Mr Porter!, Convict 99, Old Bones of the River, Ask a Policeman and Where's That Fire?

Hay's 1937 film alongside Moffatt and Marriott, Oh, Mr Porter! is often considered as one of the greatest British comedy films of all time. The British Film Institute included the film in its 360 Classic Feature Films list; Variety magazine described the movie as "amusing, if over-long", noting that there was "no love interest to mar the comedy"; and the cult website TV Cream listed it at number 41 in its list of cinema's Top 100 Films. The director Marcel Varnel considered the film as among his best work, and it was described in 2006, by The Times in its obituary for writer Val Guest, as "a comic masterpiece of the British cinema". Jimmy Perry, in his autobiography, wrote that the comedy trio of Captain Mainwaring, Corporal Jones and Private Pike in Dad's Army was inspired by watching Oh, Mr Porter.

Both Moffatt and Marriott were absent from Hay's 1938 film, Hey! Hey! USA with American comedy actor Edgar Kennedy being cast as Hay's sidekick instead; the film was a (somewhat unsuccessful) attempt to break into the American market. In his Gainsborough films, Hay wore a wig, which made it appear as if he was balding.

Hay decided to break up the partnership with Moffatt and Marriott after their 1940 film Where's That Fire? due to his concern that their act was becoming repetitive. He was known to dislike working with the pair, describing their partnership as "a three legged stool". He had also expressed concern that Moore Marriott, who portrayed Harbottle, received a bigger reaction from audiences than he did. He had been seeking to break up their partnership in previous years, and it was only due to his film Hey! Hey! USA being somewhat unsuccessful that the writers and producers successfully talked him into bringing Moffatt and Marriott back.

=== Ealing Studios ===
Hay left Gainsborough and began working with Ealing Studios in 1940, in an attempt to break up his partnership with Moffatt and Marriott. Claude Hulbert and Charles Hawtrey were Hay's sidekicks in his first film for Ealing, The Ghost of St. Michael's (1941). Both would return to act with Hay in subsequent films - Hawtrey in The Goose Steps Out (1942) and Hulbert in Hay's final film, My Learned Friend (1943). John Mills, who had appeared in Hay's first film, Those Were the Days returned to act as his sidekick in The Black Sheep of Whitehall. The Goose Steps Out (1942) for Ealing was an effective piece of anti-Nazi slapstick. In the film, Hay acts as a British spy posing as a Nazi agent and teaches Nazi students about British customs. When lecturing them on this topic, he tells the students that the V sign (often used in Britain as an insult) is a mark of respect, and instructs the class to make a synchronised V sign to a portrait of Adolf Hitler. This scene is often considered one of the most iconic from a British comedy film.

During Hay's tenure with Ealing he was credited as a director in three of his films, The Black Sheep of Whitehall, The Goose Steps Out and My Learned Friend. In all three, he co-directed with Basil Dearden. In 1942, he starred in a short information film, Go to Blazes alongside Thora Hird and Muriel George. The film was set during the Blitz and his role was a dim-witted father who tried unsuccessfully to defuse a bomb which had landed near his house, the bomb is only defused through the help of his daughter, portrayed by Hird. Also in 1942, he made an appearance in the propaganda film, The Big Blockade, playing his only straight non-comedic role among other prolific actors of the time, including Leslie Banks, John Mills and Michael Redgrave.

His final film, My Learned Friend in 1943 has been described as a masterpiece of black comedy and has been cited as paving the way for the future Ealing comedy films Kind Hearts and Coronets (1949) and The Ladykillers (1955). Due to ailing health, My Learned Friend was Hay's final film.

Hay was scheduled to star in another film for Ealing in 1943, Bob's Your Uncle, but his diagnosis of cancer prevented him from proceeding.

Hay's tenure with Ealing was a box office success and his films were critically acclaimed, but have been described as not at the level of his Gainsborough films with Moffatt and Marriott.

=== Radio career ===
The half-hour weekly Will Hay Programme began in August 1944, and was broadcast live from the BBC Paris Theatre in Lower Regent Street. With him in his schoolmaster role, were his pupils, Charles Hawtrey playing the cheeky Smart, John Clark as the class swot D'arcy Minor, and Billy Nicholls playing the dumb Beckett. The series lasted for four months and was cancelled, it is said, due to Hay's dispute with the BBC over the quality of the scripts. Just before Christmas, the show went live at the Victoria Palace for six weeks.

The sketch was performed one more time at a gathering of variety entertainers at midnight on 4 May 1945 (4 days before VE Day) before the royal family and many military notables. This was at a private function at the Life Guards barracks in Windsor. It was not publicised in the newspapers due to security concerns. Hay's character during his radio series was called Dr Muffin, a name chosen so that the students could mock him with the name "Old Crumpet".

== Astronomy ==
In June 1932 Hay joined the British Astronomical Association; in November of the same year he also became a Fellow of the Royal Astronomical Society. He is noted for having discovered a Great White Spot on the planet Saturn in 1933.

Hay kept his career in astronomy separate from his comedy career and published Through My Telescope under the name of W.T. Hay, using the same title when giving lectures on astronomy. Hay was an advocate for education on astronomy and considered those who had an interest in astronomy "the only men who see life in its true proportion". In a 1933 interview with the Daily Mail he stated "If we were all astronomers, there'd be no more war." He was a friend of William Herbert Steavenson, who would later become the President of the Royal Astronomical Society in 1957.

Shortly before Hay's death, a few items of his equipment were donated to the British Astronomical Association.

The asteroid 3125 Hay is named in his honour.

== Personal life ==
In 1907 Hay married Gladys Perkins (1889–1982), whom he had known since he was 15. They legally separated on 18 November 1935, although they never divorced; the reason Gladys gave for this was that she was a Roman Catholic. They had two daughters and a son: Gladys Elspeth Hay (1909–1979), William Edward Hay (1913–1995) and Joan Athol Hay (1917–1975). Following his separation from Gladys in 1935, he began a long-term relationship with Randi Kopstad, a native of Norway.

Off-screen, Hay was described as being somewhat of an eccentric, as well as a very serious and private man, and some thought he may have had a dark side due to his demeanour. Peter Ustinov, who made his film debut in The Goose Steps Out as a straight man to Hay, said in a 1990 interview when asked about working with him "Well, Will Hay wasn't very funny but I found that very few comics are"; he also said "And Will Hay was always wrapped in a blanket at certain hours and had his tea, and we all stopped talking while he was having his tea, and then we went on shooting. I don't remember him saying anything memorable, nothing I could remember at all. He was very funny when you saw him on the screen, but in life all those people are very, very strange."

He was known to be a hypochondriac, and would often complain of illness to his colleagues when working.

Hay was a passionate aviator, and gave flying lessons to Amy Johnson.

In 1946, while on holiday, Hay suffered a stroke which left the right side of his body crippled and also affected his speech. He was told by his doctors that he would in all likelihood only make a partial recovery. Following his stroke, he spent time in South Africa on the advice of his doctors, because of the climate. His health had improved slightly by the following year, when he had plans to become a film producer but, in 1947, his friend Marcel Varnel, who had directed many of Hay's films, died in a car accident, and Hay postponed his plans.

== Death ==
Hay made his last public appearance on Good Friday (15 April) 1949. On 18 April 1949, he died at the age of 60, after suffering a stroke at his flat in Chelsea, London. His funeral took place at Streatham Park Cemetery in London. Those who were present at Hay's final appearance described him as having shown no sign of illness, and said he had discussed his plans for the future.

== Influences ==
Comedians who have cited Hay as an influence include Ken Dodd, Eric Morecambe, Tommy Cooper, Harry Worth, Harry Enfield, Jimmy Perry and David Croft. Ronnie Barker also cited Hay as an influence, and in 1976 hosted a documentary on BBC Radio that discussed Hay's life and career.

== Legacy ==
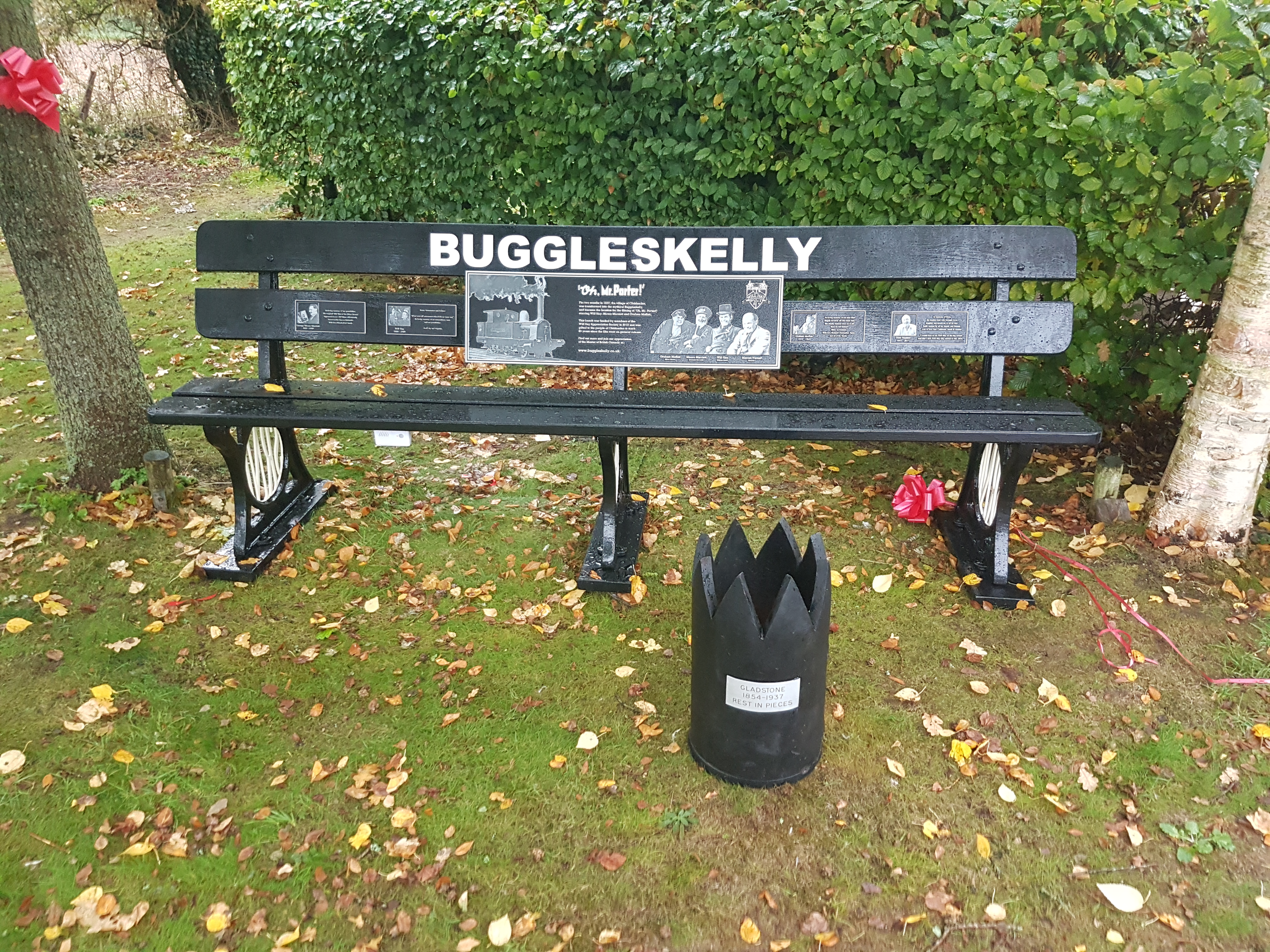
The Will Hay Appreciation Society's 'Buggleskelly' memorial bench to Will Hay and his co-stars, unveiled on Sunday 14 October 2018 in Cliddesden, Hampshire, the filming location for 'Oh, Mr Porter!'

'The Will Hay Appreciation Society' was founded in 2009 by British artist Tom Marshall and aims to preserve Hay's legacy and bring his work to a new generation of fans. As of October 2023, the organisation has over 8000 members. The Will Hay Appreciation Society unveiled a memorial bench to Will Hay, Moore Marriott and Graham Moffatt in October 2018, in Cliddesden, Hampshire, the filming location for 'Buggleskelly' in Oh, Mr Porter!. The bench was unveiled by the music producer Pete Waterman. Members of Will Hay's family were also present, including granddaughters Virginia & Joy and his great great nephews Symon & David.

The humour of Hay's films has been described as subversive and similar to that of fellow English comedian Frank Randle. His films are often characterised as exhibiting traits of anti-authoritarianism and having a satirical approach towards how authority figures are portrayed. This is notable with Hay himself, who often played an incompetent authority figure who struggled not to be found out, but whose idiocy was discovered by those around him.

In 2009 a biography of Hay by Graham Rinaldi was published with a foreword by Ken Dodd. Hay never published an autobiography during his lifetime; however, when ill in the 1940s, he had begun writing one, entitled I Enjoyed Every Minute. Excerpts from this unpublished autobiography were included in the 2009 book.

Roy Hudd defined Hay as the "supreme master" of sketch comedy.

== Filmography ==
Year	Title	Role	Notes
1922	Playmates		Silent short
1933	Know Your Apples		lost Short
1934	Those Were the Days	Magistrate Brutus Poskett	
1934	Radio Parade of 1935	William Garland	
1935	Dandy Dick	The Reverend Richard Jedd	
1935	Boys Will Be Boys	Dr Alec Smart	
1936	Where There's a Will	Benjamin Stubbins	
1936	Windbag the Sailor	Captain Ben Cutlet	
1937	Good Morning, Boys	Dr Benjamin Twist	
1937	Oh, Mr Porter!	William Porter	
1938	Convict 99	Dr Benjamin Twist	
1938	Hey! Hey! USA	Dr Benjamin Twist	
1938	Old Bones of the River	Professor Benjamin Tibbetts	
1939	Ask a Policeman	Sergeant Dudfoot	
1939	Where's That Fire?	Captain Benjamin Viking	
1941	The Ghost of St. Michael's	Will Lamb	
1942	The Black Sheep of Whitehall	Professor Davis	
1942	The Big Blockade	Royal Navy: Skipper	
1942	The Goose Steps Out	William Potts / Muller	
1942	Go to Blazes	Father	Short
1943	My Learned Friend	William Fitch	
2016	Will Hay and the Stars	Self	Documentary

== See also ==
- Moore Marriott
- Graham Moffatt
- British comedy films
- Charles Hawtrey
- Tom Marshall
- Radio comedy
- Cinema of the United Kingdom
- List of British actors
- English film directors
- Royal Astronomical Society
