= It's That Man Again =

BBC radio show (1939–1949)

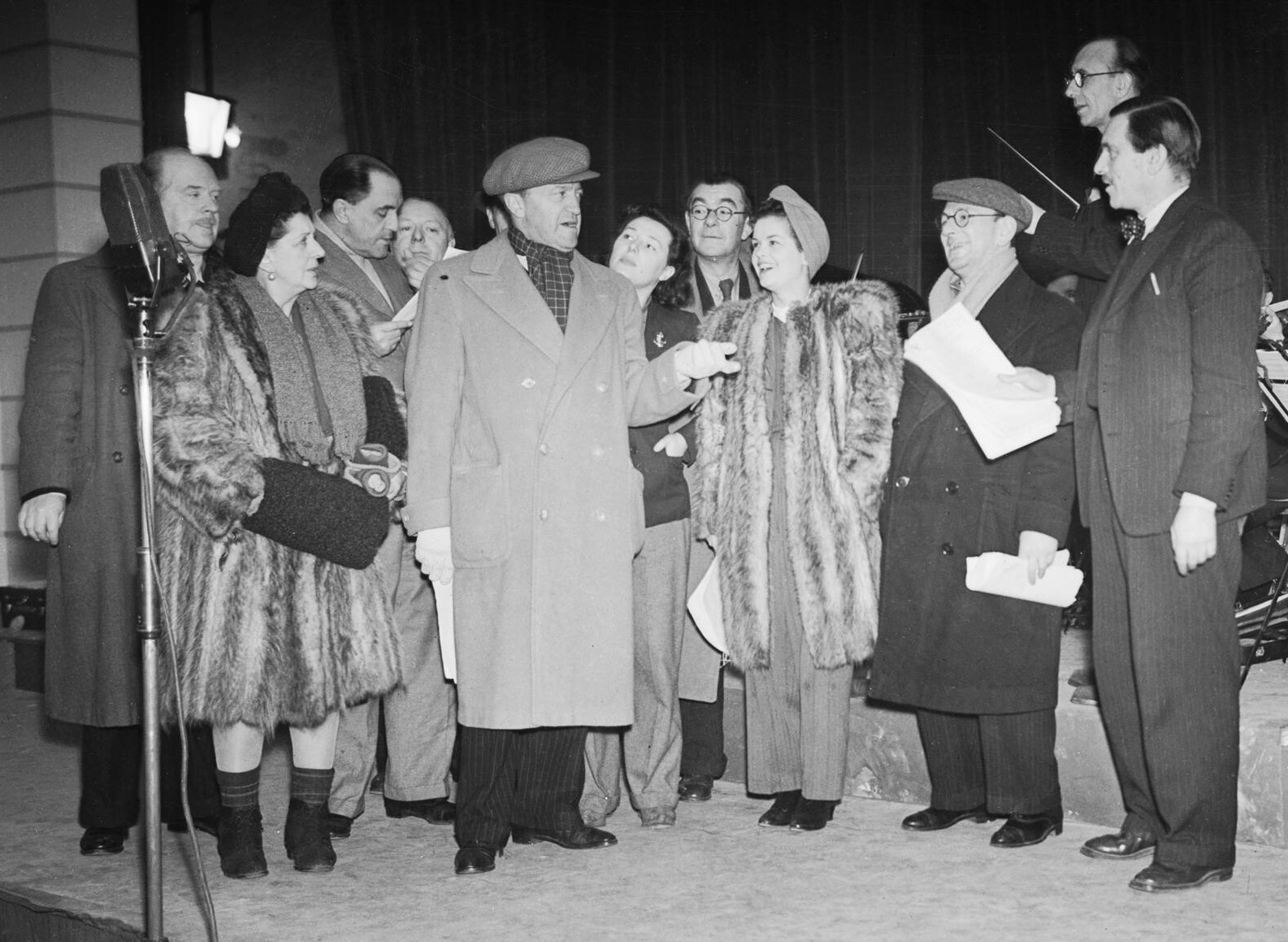
- The ITMA cast at rehearsal during a visit to the Home Fleet at Scapa Flow, January 1944
- Other names: ITMA, It's That Sand Again, V-ITMA
- Genre: Sketch comedy
- Running time: 30 minutes
- Country of origin: United Kingdom
- Home station: BBC National Programme; BBC Home Service
- Syndicates: BBC Forces Programme; BBC Light Programme; BBC Radio 4 Extra
- Starring: Tommy Handley
- Written by: Ted Kavanagh
- Produced by: Francis Worsley
- Recording studio: London (s 1, 7–12); Bristol (s 2); Bangor, Wales (s 3–6); Llandudno, Wales (s 5, one show); Manchester (Specials)
- Original release: 12 July 1939 – 6 January 1949
- No. of series: 12
- No. of episodes: 310, including 5 specials

It's That Man Again (commonly contracted to ITMA) was a radio comedy programme from the BBC which ran for twelve series from 1939 to 1949. The shows featured Tommy Handley in the central role, a fast-talking figure, around whom the other characters orbited. The programmes were written by Ted Kavanagh and produced by Francis Worsley. Handley died during the twelfth series, the remaining programmes of which were immediately cancelled: ITMA could not work without him, and no further series were commissioned.

ITMA was a character-driven comedy whose satirical targets included officialdom and the proliferation of minor wartime regulations. Parts of the scripts were rewritten in the hour before the broadcast, to ensure topicality. ITMA broke away from the conventions of previous radio comedies, and from the humour of the music halls. The shows used sound effects in a novel manner, which, alongside a wide range of voices and accents, created the programme's atmosphere.

The show presented more than seventy regular characters during its twelve seasons, most of them with his or her own catchphrase. Among them were the bibulous Colonel Chinstrap ("I don't mind if I do"), the charlady Mrs Mopp ("Can I do you now, sir?"), the incompetent German agent Funf ("this is Funf speaking"), the courtly odd-job men Cecil and Claude ("After you, Claude—no, after you, Cecil"), the Middle Eastern hawker Ali Oop ("I go—I come back"), and the lugubrious Mona Lott ("It's being so cheerful that keeps me going"). To keep the show fresh, old characters were dropped and new ones introduced over the years.

ITMA was an important contributor to British morale during the Second World War, with its cheerful take on the day-to-day preoccupations of the public, but its detailed topicality—one of its greatest attractions at the time—has prevented it from wearing well on repeated hearing. The show's lasting legacy is its influence on subsequent BBC comedy. ITMA's innovative structure—a fast-moving half-hour show with musical interludes and a cast of regular characters with popular catchphrases—was successfully continued in comedy shows of the 1950s and 1960s, such as Take It from Here, The Goon Show and Round the Horne.

== Background ==
The comedian Tommy Handley started in music hall before becoming a regular feature on BBC radio from 1924. By the end of the 1920s he was, according to the writers Andy Foster and Steve Furst, a household name in Britain; his popularity continued into the 1930s. The scriptwriter Ted Kavanagh was a fan of Handley and wrote a script for a comedy sketch for him in 1926. Handley liked the work and bought it; it was the start of a professional relationship that lasted until Handley's death in 1949.

Although the BBC featured many comic acts in its variety programmes, it had no regular comedy series until early 1938, when Band Waggon and Danger! Men at Work began. The former, which ran for three series in 1938 and 1939, was a particular success; John Watt, the BBC's director of variety, wanted a successor and decided that Handley would be the right person to present it. In June 1939 Handley, Kavanagh and the producer Francis Worsley met at the Langham Hotel, London, to discuss ideas for a sketch show to meet Watt's criteria. They decided to emulate the quick-fire style of American radio programmes such as the Burns and Allen Show, although with a much more English quality.

Initial plans were to call the new programme MUG—the "Ministry of Universal Gratification"—but Worsley preferred ITMA. "ITMA", or "It's That Man Again", referred to Adolf Hitler, and the term was used as a headline to describe him by Bert Gunn, the editor of the Daily Express. (Note: The phrase "It's That Man Again" was originally used by members of the American Republican Party when referring to President Franklin D. Roosevelt as he introduced another element of the New Deal, and was only later used in the British press to refer to Hitler.)

== Format ==
ITMA was a character-driven comedy and contained parody and satire, unlike previous British radio comedy. The programme's satirical targets during the war were government departments and the ostensibly petty wartime regulations, although the programme "never challenged authority but instead acted as a safety valve for the public's irritation with bureaucracy, wartime shortages, queues and the black market", according to the cultural historian Martin Dibbs.

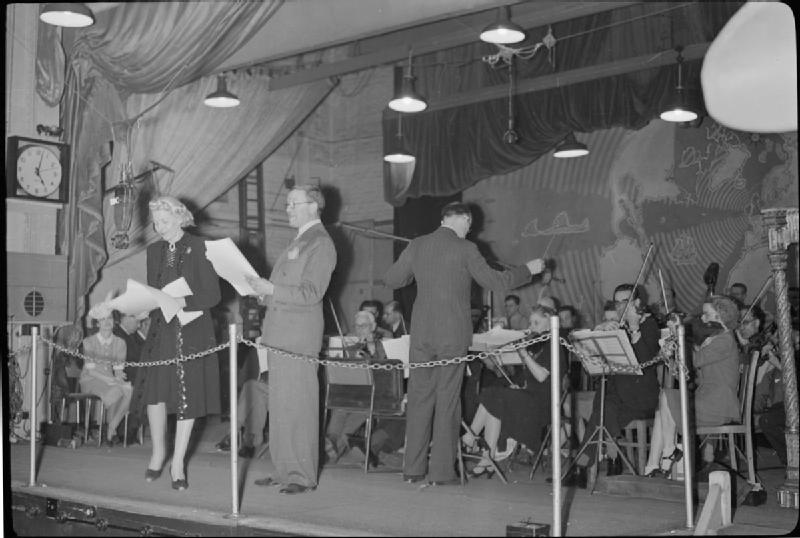
Handley (centre) introduces Ann Rich, a new singer for ITMA; Charles Shadwell conducts the orchestra in the background.

According to Foster and Furst ITMA was "entirely new, breaking away from the conventions of both radio and music hall comedy". It relied on Handley's quick-fire delivery of the humour, with his "near-miraculous technique". The writer and producer John Fisher, in his examination of 20th-century comedians and comedy, highlights ITMA's "speed of delivery, its quick-fire succession of short scenes and verbal non-sequiturs, all breaking away from the traditional music hall sketch orientation of Band Waggon". The broadcasts had an average of eighteen-and-a-half minutes of dialogue into which Kavanagh would attempt to write one hundred laughs—an average of a laugh every eleven seconds. Between the comic scenes there were usually two musical interludes in each show: the first purely orchestral and the second featuring a song from the current resident singer.

The storylines for each week were thin, and the programme was written to have Handley at the centre interacting with a cast of recurring characters, all of whom had their own catchphrase or phrases. The catchphrases were used deliberately to help the listening public to identify which of the characters was speaking. The programme was broadcast live each week and many of the show's sound effects were done live alongside the actors. For ITMA a sound effect was not a shorthand way of setting a scene for a listener, (Note: For example, at the time BBC Radio used a seagull as a shorthand way of letting listeners know the action was taking place at the seaside or on a cliff top.) but "as a means of punctuating the rapid progress of events ... doing the work of words, and permitting an extraordinarily economical drama for a medium that relies on words—and sounds", according to the academic Peter Davison. The variety of characters and sounds was key to Kavanagh, who wrote that he wanted:

to use sound for all it was worth, the sound of different voices and accents, the use of catchphrases, the impact of funny sounds in words, of grotesque effects to give atmosphere—every device to create the illusion of rather crazy or inverted reality.

The scripts were written during the week of broadcast to ensure topicality. The year after ITMA ended, Kavanagh reflected "I myself cannot understand some of the jokes. They were skits on a nine-days wonder—a headline of that day's paper, and dead the following week. Every programme is an accurate reflection of the war situation at the time." Some parts of a script were rewritten in the hours leading up to a broadcast as the news changed. Kavanagh visited army camps and factories to listen to the patois and slang, the current jokes doing the rounds, as well as complaints and frustration, and used the material in the show. In this manner, Worsley considers that ITMA was "the closest radio had come to the everyday jokes that ordinary people have always made".

As the programme matured, Kavanagh changed the flow of the programme away from the disjointed collection of scenes or sketches and towards a more defined storyline.

== Broadcasts ==
=== Pre-war ===
==== Series 1: July to August 1939 ====
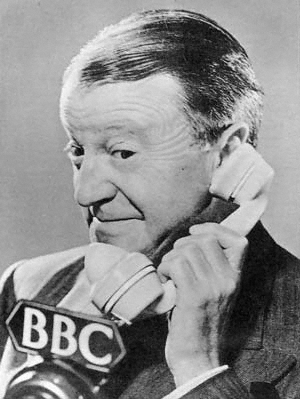
The comedian Tommy Handley in the 1940s

The first series of ITMA was planned to be a trial run of six shows of 45-minute duration, broadcast fortnightly. They began on 12 July 1939, performed at a BBC sound facility, either at Maida Vale Studios, or St. George's Hall. The shows were broadcast live on the BBC National Programme at 8.15 pm. The programme was set on a ship able to broadcast radio programmes, with Handley as the station controller and presenter. He was accompanied by Cecilia Eddy, Eric Egan and Sam Heppner. The show included a quiz hosted by Lionel Gamlin.

In an article in the Radio Times that accompanied the first programme, Worsley described the premise of the show: Handley "gets hold of a ship, equips it with a transmitter and studio, and sails the Seven Seas scattering broadcast culture (Handley brand) and 'commercials' (any brand)". Music was provided by the Jack Harris Band, who had been performing at London hotspots, including the Café de Paris and the London Casino. With a tense international situation in mid-1939, Kavanagh was careful to avoid writing in political jokes, or any material too topical or sensitive. Handley was known to keep to a script, with little or no ad-libbing to worry the producers.

The fourth episode of ITMA was broadcast on 30 August. When the Second World War broke out on 3 September, the remainder of the series was cancelled. (Note: The pre-war broadcasts of ITMA comprised one series with four programmes, from 12 July 1939 to 30 August 1939.) The show had been of limited success, and Worsley thought it was likely to have been "another broadcasting flop".

=== Wartime ===
==== Series 2: September 1939 to February 1940 ====
The BBC had planned for the outbreak of war, and once it was declared, the Variety Department was moved to Bristol. (Note: ITMA broadcast seven series during the war, from September 1939 to June 1945: Series 2: 19 September 1939 to 6 February 1940 (20 weeks); "Star Variety Special" from the Palace Theatre, Manchester on 18 May 1940; Series 3: 20 June to 25 July 1941 (6 weeks); Series 4: 26 September 1941 to 1 May 1942 (32 weeks); "A Grand ITMA Concert" on 12 May 1942; Series 5: 18 September 1942 to 29 January 1943 (20 weeks); "A Grand ITMA Concert" on 12 May 1942; Series 6: 15 April to 29 July 1943 (16 weeks); Series 7: 7 October 1943 to 8 June 1944 (36 weeks); "Well for Santa Claus" (as part of Children's Hour) on 25 December 1943; Series 8: 21 September 1944 to 14 June 1945 (39 weeks)) The relocation meant some of the original performers were not available; a new cast was assembled from those who had moved to Bristol and who had received the requisite security clearance from the Ministry of Information. Handley was accompanied by Vera Lennox, Maurice Denham, Sam Costa and Jack Train, and the music for the second series was by the Jack Hylton Band, conducted by Billy Ternent and supported by the Rhythm Octet.

With the idea of a broadcasting ship now too improbable during wartime, the premise of the programme changed to have Handley as the head of the fictional Ministry of Aggravation and Mysteries, where he worked in the Office of Twerps. Other changes to the format included dropping the quiz section of the programme—which Worsley thought held up the flow of the show—replaced by "Radio Fakenburg", a spoof of Radio Luxembourg. The running time was reduced from the 45 minutes of the first series to half an hour, and remained so through all the subsequent series. A blackout was in place for evenings and nights, and all cinemas and theatres had been closed by the government; such measures provided a boost to the listening figures for the show. The writer and comedian Barry Took writes that the success also came from the programme's "self-assurance and cheerful optimism [which was] a welcome relief in that time of fear and uncertainty".

The second series of ITMA finished in February 1940 and the show went on a nationwide tour that kept it off the air for nearly 18 months, except for one special edition in May 1940. Took notes that the show lacked the impact it had on radio, as Handley's performances were more intimate through a microphone than in a theatre.

==== Series 3 and 4: June 1941 to May 1942 ====
While ITMA was absent from the airwaves, the German bombing campaign had included Bristol, which triggered a move of the Variety Department to Bangor, northwest Wales, in April 1941. When series three began broadcasting in June 1941, Kavanagh had introduced more characters, and set the show in the fictional seaside town of Foaming-at-the-Mouth with Handley as its mayor, renaming the programme, briefly, It's That Sand Again, before it reverted to ITMA. There were also changes in the cast. Denham and Costa had both joined the armed forces since the previous series; new actors were brought in, including Horace Percival, Dorothy Summers, Clarence Wright and Fred Yule.

Series 3 ran for six weeks, ending on 25 July 1941. Series 4 followed two months later, beginning on 26 September. The programme was attracting 16 million listeners by this stage, and was the most popular programme the BBC Variety Department had ever broadcast. During programme five, listeners heard the explosion of two naval mines that had been dropped on Bangor, landing half a mile (0.8 km) from the studio, instead of in the River Mersey. Although the actors continued after a brief pause, the programme had been taken off the air and replaced with music.

In April 1942 ITMA provided a command performance at Windsor Castle in the presence of George VI and his queen on the occasion of the 16th birthday of Princess Elizabeth. It was, notes Worsley, the first Royal Command Radio Show. The royal family were fans of the programme; a member of the Royal Household said that if the war were to end between 8.30 and 9.00 pm on a Thursday night none of the household would dare to tell the King until ITMA had finished.

==== Series 5 and 6: September 1942 to July 1943 ====
Series 5 started in September 1942 and ran for twenty weeks. One of the programmes in November was broadcast on the BBC Forces Programme to the soldiers in North Africa, the first time the show had been transmitted to the troops. The shows became increasingly topical and up-to-the-minute. Worsley began experimenting with the size of the audience to see which worked best. He tried in the theatres and cinemas of Bangor and Llandudno to get an audience of 2000, and in the studio in Bangor with 200; he also tried with no audience, and settled on 200 as the right number. (Note: Took notes that for decades afterwards, radio and television audiences in the UK all had 200–300 people, based on Worsley's research.) The premise of the show changed again with Handley ejected as the mayor of Foaming-in-the-Mouth, and now the manager of a munitions factory. Several new characters were introduced, including Colonel Chinstrap, a dipsomaniac retired army officer voiced by Train.

Before the sixth series began recording, a film version, It's That Man Again, was released. Starring Handley and including many of the radio programme regulars, it was written by Kavanagh and Howard Irving Young and directed by Walter Forde. The Times considered it difficult to transpose a radio show format onto a cinema screen, but thought Forde "manages his difficult task extremely well". As a consequence, the reviewer thought the film "achieves at least a partial success through the extravagance of its own craziness".

The scenario of the programme changed again for series six, when, following a decision to move the munitions factory underground, a sulphur spring was tapped and Foaming-in-the-Mouth became a spa.

==== Series 7 and 8: October 1943 to June 1945 ====
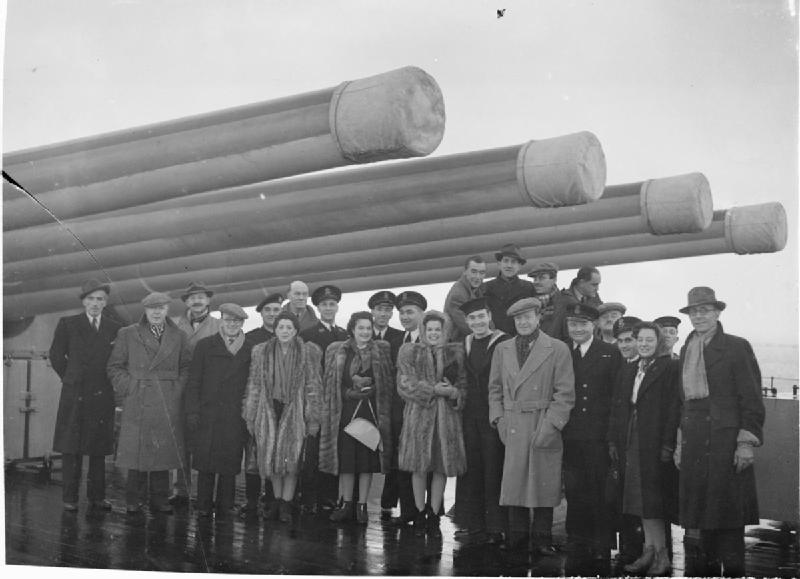
The ITMA cast with some of the crew of HMS Anson (79) under four of the ship's 14-inch guns

In the latter part of 1943 the Variety Department finished a relocation back to London. Series 7 of ITMA, which began in October that year, was recorded in the Criterion Theatre at Piccadilly Circus. The show restarted without Train, whose health, which had been worsening for some time, broke down completely; he spent a year in a sanatorium in North Wales recovering. Worsley took the decision to rest Train's characters rather than have another actor portray him; although he was criticised for the decision, he said "any imitation was to my mind as paste to real diamonds". The series included broadcasts for each of the three forces: in January 1944 ITMA was broadcast from the Royal Navy base at Scapa Flow, a show for the Royal Air Force was recorded at the Criterion in February, and an Army edition from the Garrison Theatre at the Royal Artillery Barracks, Woolwich.

Series 8 began in September 1944 with a special show from the Wolseley Motors factory in Birmingham, (Note: At the time, the factory was engaged on wartime production of tanks and other vehicles for the army.) but the show was not well received, and it was decided not to have any further broadcasts away from the studio. Train returned to the cast, but at the end of 1944 Worsley was hospitalised for seven months. (Note: Worsley had been struggling with what he thought was lumbago for a few months, but found out that it was a more serious condition and was quickly hospitalised.) The production duties were taken up by Ronnie Waldman until Worsley returned in May 1945. His first programme back was V-ITMA, the special edition show of 11 May 1945, which celebrated the end of the war in Europe. (Note: V-ITMA was, as Worsley describes it, "Tommy's own private celebration of the great event".) The series came to an end a month later, after a run of 39 weeks.

=== Post-war ===
==== Series 9 to 12, post-war: September 1945 to January 1949 ====
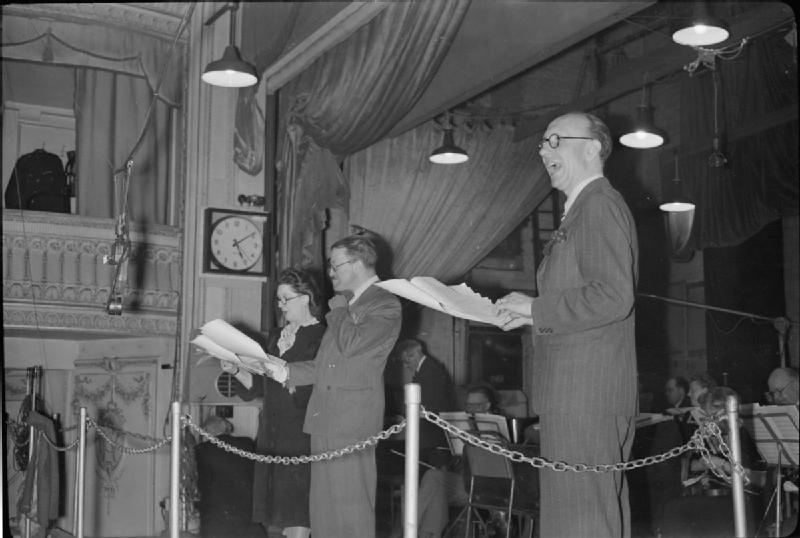
Handley (centre) and Dorothy Summers recording an episode of ITMA in 1945; the conductor Charles Shadwell (right) laughs.

For the start of the post-war ITMAs, Handley, Kavanagh and Worsley decided to change many of the cast to keep the show fresh; Dorothy Summers, Sydney Keith, Dino Galvani and Horace Percival were all released from the show and replaced by Hugh Morton, Mary O'Farrell, Carleton Hobbs and Lind Joyce; Clarence Wright returned to the programme. (Note: ITMA broadcast four series after the war, from September 1945 to January 1949: Series 9: 20 September 1945 to 13 June 1946 (39 weeks); "Whither Tomtopia? (A Discussion on a Burning Topic)" on 12 September 1946; Series 10: 19 September 1946 to 12 June 1947 (39 weeks); Series 11: 25 September 1947 to 10 June 1948 (38 weeks); Series 12: 23 September 1948 to 6 January 1949 (16 weeks)) The premise of the show changed too: Handley left Foaming-in-the-Mouth and became the governor of the fictional island of Tomtopia. The storyline towards the end of series 9 centred on a government investigation of the administration on Tomtopia; the series ended in June 1946 with Handley leaving Tomtopia to return to Britain.

A prequel programme to series 10, "Whither Tomtopia?", was based in the idea that Handley had "to face an enquiry into his governorship" of the island. He faced questions from, among others, Dilys Powell—the film critic from The Sunday Times—the medical spokesman Dr Charles Hill and the author A. G. Street; the programme was chaired by Sir William Darling, MP. (Note: The idea for the programme came from a real life lunch given at the Connaught Rooms on Great Queen Street for the cast of ITMA. Postprandial speeches dealt with Tomtopia as if it were a real crown colony, and "Handley's administration" of the island was found inadequate.) The remainder of the series dealt with Handley living in the fictional Castle WeeHoose in Scotland, where he was building a rocket to take him to the Moon. In about week six of the series, the rocket was launched, but crash-landed on Tomtopia, where a new governor—Percy Palaver, played by Deryck Guyler—was in charge.

Series 11, which began in September 1947, had the final recruit to the ITMA cast: Hattie Jacques, who played Ella Phant and Sophie Tuckshop. She became so nervous during the audition that Handley held her hand, which she found made her more nervous. Handley's health was beginning to decline by the end of the 38-week series, and it was suggested that series 12 should be delayed. He said no, and ITMA began again in September 1948. On 9 January 1949, three days after the sixteenth episode of the series—the 310th episode of ITMA—Handley died suddenly of a cerebral haemorrhage. The news was announced on that evening's radio, at the close of the Sunday evening repeat of the show, by the Director General of the BBC, Sir William Haley, who insisted on making the announcement himself. Without its star, ITMA was cancelled; Took observes that Handley "was so much the keystone and embodiment of the actual performance that ITMA died with him".

== Leading characters ==
The main character was always Handley's, whether as manager of the pirate radio station, head of the Office of Twerps, Mayor of Foaming-at-the-Mouth, factory manager, Governor of Tomtopia or down-and-out. He remained the fast-talking central figure, around whom all the other characters orbited. Took comments that it is impossible to put them into order of popularity: "They were all successful. Everyone had their own favourite". Some of the best known are described below, in order of first appearance in the show.

=== Funf ===
Funf
Played by Jack Train
Series 2–6
Catchphrase: This is Funf speaking.

Funf, (Note: Although fünf is the German for "five", the name was not chosen for any association with "fifth column": Worsley, hearing his schoolboy son counting in German, decided that Funf—pronounced foonf—sounded ideal.) "the enemy agent with the feet of sauerkraut", was the earliest of the show's major supporting characters, making his debut in the second programme of the second series. He was an incompetent German agent, ITMA's response to a national scare in 1940 about a supposed "fifth column" in Britain. He would telephone Handley to make dark threats, in a sinister, hollow voice, which Train produced by speaking across the top of an empty glass held next to the microphone. Handley's verbal dexterity continually left Funf in confusion. Funf, described by the media historian Denis Gifford as "the greatest of all war-time characters", became what Worsley called "a national craze" and helped to make the German propaganda machine a source of public ridicule in Britain.

=== The Diver ===
The Diver
Played by Horace Percival
Series 3–8
Catchphrases:
• Don't forget the diver
• Every penny makes the water warmer
• I'm going down now, sir.

The Diver was drawn from a real-life figure familiar to Handley's generation of Merseysiders. The one-legged diver and swimmer Frank Gadsby was well known at New Brighton in the first decades of the 20th century for high-diving off the pier, watched by what the Liverpool Echo called "countless boatloads of people". He would solicit donations with phrases appropriated by his caricature in ITMA: "Don't forget the diver, sir, don't forget the diver. Every penny makes the water warmer!" (Note: In 1919 Gadsby, known as "Professor" or "Peggy" Gadsby, went one better by diving into the River Mersey from a biplane. To make his act more spectacular he sometimes oiled himself and set fire to the oil before diving in. When he retired, he was succeeded by another diver, Bernard Pykett, who had lost a leg in the First World War. When the pier was reconstructed in 1930 the local authority prohibited diving, and, as the Echo put it, "Don't forget the diver! The familiar appeal for the one-legged diver ... will no longer be heard by arriving trippers". Handley was not the only Liverpudlian comedian to celebrate the diver: he is mentioned in a 1942 song by Arthur Askey: "First class, third class, guard and engine driver/Sailors, whalers, don't forget the diver".)

In ITMA the Diver was what Worsley called a "crossing" character: he would cross a scene for a few seconds, often to interrupt Handley at a particularly inopportune moment:

There would be a gurgling sound, a few bubbles, and up would bob the Diver. His few words very soon became part of the country's vocabulary, as did so many of our phrases, and it was not long before "Don't forget the Diver" was heard on all sides, in bars, in buses, on stations, even from disembodied voices in the black-out, and practically no lift descended without someone saying in those weary tones "I'm going down now, sir!"

=== Cecil and Claude ===
Cecil and Claude
Played by Horace Percival and Jack Train
Series 3–5
Catchphrase:
After you, Claude. No, after you, Cecil.

Two ceremonious odd-job men—also broker's men—who talked in rhyme:

Cecil: After you, Claude –
Claude: No, after you, Cecil
Handley: Cut out the etiquette—you've a big job to do.
Cecil: Do you want us to push your chair, Mr Mayor?
Claude: It'll need a new tyre, sire.
Handley: No. I want you to go round to the lighthouse and lend a hand erecting our Foaming Fun Fair.
Cecil: Will there be swings and things?
Claude: There'll be coconut shies I surmise.
Handley: Yes, and merry-go-rounds, you hounds ...
Cecil: Then we'll have a dekko Sir Echo.
Claude: We'll have a penn'orth Sir Kenneth.

=== Ali Oop ===
Ali Oop
Played by Horace Percival
Series 3–4
Catchphrase: I go—I come back.

Ali Oop was a caricature of a Middle-Eastern hawker, persistently trying to sell improbable goods to Handley:

Ali Oop: Please mister, you give me permission to peddle on your pier?
Handley: Certainly not.
Ali Oop: Any other town I peddle where I like.
Handley: Ah, but we're very particular here.
Ali Oop: You give me licence—I give you very funny toy. Make loud noises when sat on.
Handley: They used to laugh when I sat down at the piano. (Note: Handley's allusion is to a famous American advertising slogan for mail-order piano lessons, "They all laughed when I sat down at the piano, But oh!, when I began to play".) You get out of here and take your penetrating effluvia with you.
Ali Oop: I go—I come back.

=== Sam Scram and Lefty ===
Sam Scram and Lefty
Played by Sydney Keith and Jack Train
Series 3–8 (Sam); 3–6 and 8 (Lefty)
Catchphrases:
• Boss, boss, sumpin' terrible's happened! (Sam)
• It's me noives! (Lefty).

Sam and Lefty were two American characters, both nominally gangsters, but of a conspicuously uncombative kind. Sam, Handley's bodyguard, was prone to panic:

Sam: Boss, boss, sumpin' terrible's happened!
Handley: Don't tell me the Scharnhorst has come up again?
Sam: No, there's a tough-looking guy outside, boss.
Handley: Has he got a broken handcuff on one wrist?
Sam: Yes, boss!
Handley: And a bludgeon in the other?
Sam: Yeah, boss!
Handley: And crime written all over his face?
Sam: Yeah, boss!
Handley: It's my brother: send him in.

Lefty was of a nervous disposition. At a fairground shooting gallery with Sam:

Lefty: I got the gun—they're going to get the woiks. ... Missed 'em!
Sam: I thought you were a dead shot with one of dem tings.
Lefty: Aw—it's me noives, I tell ya—its me noives.

When Train was ill during series 7, Lefty was temporarily replaced by Butch Scram, Sam's brother, played by Bryan Herbert.

=== Mrs Mopp ===
Mrs Mopp
Played by Dorothy Summers
Series 4–8
Catchphrases:
• Can I do you now, sir?
• I've brought this for you, sir.
• TTFN.

Although Mrs Mopp, the charlady, was in fewer than half the series of ITMA, she was one of the best-loved characters, and was remembered long after the show finished. She would burst through Handley's door, usually when least convenient, and hoarsely ask, "Can I do you now sir?" (Note: Mrs Mopp's opening words were originally "Can I do for you now, sir", but the "for" was omitted, at first by accident and then because the line was more effective without it.) She regularly brought Handley peculiar presents, nominally edible as a rule, beginning with some carrot jelly she had sieved through her jumper. In a show recorded before a Royal Navy audience she brought him "a Bosun's Blancmange". At the end of their scenes together she would bid him "Ta-ta for now", soon abbreviated to "TTFN".

Mrs Mopp: Can I do you now, sir?
Handley: Well, if it isn't Mrs Mopp the vamping vassal with the tousled tassel. I thought you told me you were called up?
Mrs Mopp: Well, sir, I had me medical.
Handley: And were you passed A.1?
Mrs Mopp: Oh no, sir. I'm passed sixty-two.
Handley: You don't look a day over sixty-one. I mean, were you passed fit? ...
Mrs Mopp: No, sir—I was examined by a lady doctor. She wanted me to remove my bonnet.
Handley: Disgraceful! I expect she wanted to open a false front.
Mrs Mopp: I wouldn't let her meddle with my modesty vest, sir. I said, "You must take me as you find me". The Labour [viz. labour exchange] sent me to you, sir.
Handley: The Labour? That's capital. I'll put you in charge of the sock exchange.
Mrs Mopp: Oh, thank you, sir. I brought this for you.
Handley: Isn't that nice. What is it—an engineer's indiscretion?
Mrs Mopp: No, sir, it's an overseer's 'otpot.
Handley: Thank you, Mrs M. There'll be an 'otpot in the Old Tom tonight.
Mrs Mopp: Ta-ta for now.

At their last meeting Mrs Mopp bade Handley "TTFN", to which he responded, "NCTWWASBE"—"Never Clean The Window With A Soft-Boiled Egg". (Note: Handley's comebacks like this to Mrs Mopp's "TTFN" were his own last-minute inventions, not known to anybody else in advance. His longest is thought to be NKABTYSIRWU—Never Kiss A Baby Till You're Sure It's Right Way Up.) After being written out of ITMA she had her own series of quarter-hour programmes, The Private Life of Mrs Mopp, written by Kavanagh.

=== Commercial Traveller ===
Commercial Traveller
Played by Clarence Wright
Series 4–5
Catchphrase: Good morning! Nice day!.

The Commercial Traveller, like the Diver, was a "crossing" character, distracting Handley from the business at hand with his irrelevant sales patter:

Traveller: Good morning.
Handley: Good morning
Traveller: Nice day.
Handley: No.
Traveller: Any helicopters, motor cars or washing machines?
Handley: Yes, please.
Traveller: You can't have them—they're only for export.
Handley: What have you come here for, then?
Traveller: So that I can call again. Good morning.
Handley: Good morning.
Traveller: Nice day.

=== Signor So-So ===
Signor So-So
Played by Dino Galvani
Series 4–8
Catchphrase: Notting at all! Notting at all!.

Handley's scatty secretary was planned as an Italian equivalent of Funf, but "his chronic mismanagement of the English tongue proved too endearing and he remained at Handley's side as a well-loved language joke". His incurable tendency to malapropisms caused him to address a female character: "Ah, you attract me like a maggot! Let me cuss you on both cheeks". His verbal infelicities became infectious and regularly caused Handley's character to trip over his words:

Handley: Now, So-So, you are an architect, aren't you?
So-So: Oh yes, Mr Hagglemuch. I am an unqualified artichoke. I have built many sky-scrappers, and bolks of falts.
Handley: Bolks of falts?
So-So: Yes—luxury falts.
Handley: Now listen, you leaning tower of Pisa, you can say bolks of falts as easy as I can.
So-So: You mean blocks of flats. I have also built a villain in the country.
Handley: A villain?
So-So: Yes, a semi-detached villain. ... Come this way. This is your office. I will finish it.
Handley: Listen, So-So, leave the finishing—er—furnishing of this to me. Any more of your basic English and I'd go mad.
So-So: Oka-da-doke.

=== Colonel Chinstrap ===
Colonel Chinstrap
Played by Jack Train
Series 5–6 and 8–12
Catchphrase: I don't mind if I do.

The bibulous Colonel Chinstrap was a retired army officer, perpetually on the look-out for a free drink. (Note: Jack Train and John Snagge recalled that Chinstrap was based on an acquaintance of Snagge's, a retired Indian Army officer, who told him, "I have bought a water heater on a ten-year instalment plan and the devils who are selling it to me don't know I'm dying of drink". The man did not recognise himself in Chinstrap, whom he considered "exactly like a lot of silly chumps I used to know in India".) The Times commented that his voice "carried the unmistakeable aroma of vintage port and brandy". An unnamed prototype of the character appeared in the third series:

Handley: Didn't I meet you in Rumbellipoor, sir?
Train: You did not, sir. I was never there.
Handley: Then you must have a double.
Train: Thanks, I will.

The character reappeared in the fifth series, now identified as Colonel Humphrey Chinstrap; he rapidly became one of the show's most popular features. He would "mishear" an innocent remark as an invitation to a drink:

Handley: Colonel, you have been treated most shabbily. Chinstrap: A glass of Chablis, sir? I don’t mind if I do.	Handley: Why don't you try a swim in the Serpentine? Chinstrap: Try a gin and turpentine? I don't mind if I do.
Handley: Funf ... He's a sly Jerry; Chinstrap: Did I hear you say "dry sherry", Handley? I don't mind if I do.	Handley: King John signing the Magna Carta at Runnymede. Chinstrap: Rum and mead, sir? I don't mind if I do.

The catchphrase, "I don't mind if I do", was not new, (Note: The Oxford English Dictionary dates the phrase—"a humorous circumlocution accepting an invitation, esp. the offer of a (usually alcoholic) drink"—to at least 1847.) but ITMA brought it into widespread popular use. The Colonel had a life beyond ITMA. Train ("assisted by Colonel Chinstrap") made a gramophone record of a song called "I don't mind if I do" in 1949; Chinstrap and his ITMA colleague Major Mundy offered comments on the Lord's Test Match in two short broadcasts in June 1949; Train, playing Chinstrap, co-starred in the 1950 comedy series The Great Gilhooly, and appeared weekly on television in late 1951 and early 1952 with scenes from the Colonel's life story. In 1952 Evans Brothers published Chinstrap's autobiography—ghost-written by Kavanagh, with a foreword by Train. In a 1954 BBC radio programme he featured in The True Story of Humphrey Chinstrap (Col. Retd.), "the authentic history of a warrior who penetrated the darkest jungles of Whitehall and Wooloomooloo armed only with a sword and a corkscrew". Train twice made guest appearances as Chinstrap in The Goon Show (1957 and 1959). (Note: The Goon Show historian Roger Wilmut comments, "It is interesting that the character, although from a different show a decade earlier, fits into the Goon Show framework with no sense of strain".)

=== Mona Lott ===
Mona Lott
Played by Joan Harben
Series 10–12
Catchphrase:
It's being so cheerful that keeps me going.

Mona Lott (subsequently, after her marriage, Mona Little), the lugubrious laundress, was among the later creations to feature in the show, appearing in the last three series. She would regale Handley with her latest woes, her doleful demeanour in ludicrous contrast with her mantra, "It's being so cheerful that keeps me going". For Mona, a domestic disaster such as a burst water tank would become increasingly calamitous, until her husband ...

... started rowing the bed about the room shouting, "Any more for the Skylark?" and then somebody opened the bungalow door and he went sailing down the garden path and I haven't heard from him since.

Among other catastrophes recounted by Mona were her brother-in-law, a champion runner, walking in his sleep and getting half-way to Brighton before anyone could catch him, and, when on a train journey, "I put me head out of the window to look at the view, and the mail-bag catcher caught me. Before I knew where I was I found myself on the platform between a sack of fertiliser and a dead duck".

=== Sophie Tuckshop ===
Sophie Tuckshop
Played by Hattie Jacques
Series 11–12
Catchphrase: ... but I'm all right now.

Sophie Tuckshop was a replacement for a less successful character, Ella Phant. Jokes about the latter's size did not work well on radio because the light and girlish voice of the performer, Hattie Jacques, did not suggest a heavyweight. She described Sophie as "a terrible child who never stopped eating, with the inevitable sickening results".

Sophie: I had such a lovely dream last night—I dreamt the bed was made of marzipan and the mattress was marshmallow and the sheets were jelly and the pillows embroidered with lovely sugar violets.
Handley: Stop! Once more we halt the roar of Sophie's Tuckshop to tell you of some of the interesting things that are In Tum Tonight! Carry on, Bicarb! (Note: Handley's words parody the opening and closing announcements of the popular radio show In Town Tonight (1933–1960), delivered by a stentorian voice (Fred Yule's for a time) halting "the roar of London's traffic" to bring to the microphone "some of the interesting people who are In Town Tonight". At the end of each show the voice cried, "Carry on, London!")

== Other characters ==
Kavanagh and the ITMA team caricatured people of all ages, both sexes, and many nationalities, classes and professions. There were spoofs of national and regional types, including Johann Bull, a conspicuously Teutonic German agent trying to pass himself off as English; Chief Bigga Banga of Tomtopia, who spoke no English and Wamba M'Boojah who spoke with the grandest of Oxford accents, having been a BBC announcer; the American publicity agent, Luke Slippy; Hari Kari, a Japanese caller whose gibberish only Handley could understand, and his compatriots Bowing and Scraping. From the British regions there were the Scottish Tattie Mackintosh (and her mother); the Welsh Sam Fairfechan ("Hello, how are you? As if I cared") and his family; and the Liverpudlian Frisby Dyke, with a strong Scouse accent, puzzled by some of Handley's longer words ("What's a concentrated cacophony?"), but usually winning their weekly battle of wits. (Note: Frisby Dyke was the name of a Liverpool department store; ITMA's use of the name escaped the BBC's strict ban on advertising because the store had gone out of business in 1936.)

Leading female characters included three secretaries to Handley in his various capacities: Cilly, Dotty (her sister), and the formidable but soft-hearted Miss Hotchkiss; Mrs Lola Tickle, Handley's first charlady; the shy Lady Sonely; Banjeleo, Bigga Banga's daughter and translator; Nurse Riff-Rafferty, Handley's old nanny, with a fund of embarrassing stories of his early years; Naieve, Major Mundy's old-fashioned daughter; the "pert poppet" Poppy Poopah; Ruby Rockcake who ran the railway buffet: "No cups outside!"; the generously proportioned Ella Phant; and the two unnamed Posh Ladies, whose conversations were strewn with "dahlings" and always ended with the cry, "Taxi!"

Military figures in addition to Colonel Chinstrap included his puritanical nephew Brigadier Dear, mortified by his uncle's excesses; and Major Mundy, a British expatriate on Tomtopia with an unreconstructed 19th-century mindset.

Among the mock authority figures were Sir Short Supply, a strangulated-voiced bureaucrat; the Town Clerk, a north-country official who would offer "have a cher, Mr Mer", later Mer himself; Fusspot, an official whose name was self-explanatory; two characters with a habit of repeating the ends of their sentences: the Man from the Ministry and Inspector Squirt: "I'm Inspector Squirt—I said Squirt"; and Percy Palaver, appointed governor of Tomtopia in Handley's absence, and notable for his generally unintelligible speech punctuated with "oomyahs" and "harrumphs".

Professions and occupations were represented by, among others, the announcer at Radio Fakenburg; Atlas, the hypochondriac strongman; Bookham, a variety agent; Curly Kale, a chef who hated food and loved dreadful old jokes; Dan Dungeon, the jocose tour guide at Castle Weehouse; Farmer Jollop; Lemuel the office boy; Norman the Doorman; and Vodkin and Vladivostooge, two mad scientists.

Eccentrics included Basil Backwards ("Sir, morning good! Coffee of cup. Strong too not. Milk have rather I'd"); George Gorge, a champion glutton; Comical Chris, a persistent would-be joker; Mark Time, a nonagenarian whose response to anything was, "I'll have to ask me dad"; Mr Sninch-of-Puff, a man who spoke in spoonerisms; and Whats'isname, a man who struggled to recall the simplest nouns, and had the same effect on Handley.

== Performers ==
The list is not exhaustive: members of the cast played many other roles, mostly one-off, unnamed, and sometimes not even human; (Note: Maurice Denham played a cow, a pig and a duck belonging to Farmer Jollop in one episode in the second series.) the singers, the orchestra and the musical director, Charles Shadwell, sometimes had lines in the script. From time to time guests appeared on the show. There were recurring characters who were mentioned frequently but were never heard, such as Peter Geekie, or appeared regularly but were not given a name, such as Carleton Hobbs's man whose banal weekly tales began and ended "Ain't it a shame, eh? Ain't it a shame?" and Hugh Morton's speaker whose sentences began softly and ended in a deafening shout.

Performer	Series	Regular roles	Notes
Jean Capra	7–9	"Ever So" girl; Naieve; Poppy Poopah	Jean Capra (1916–1991) was an actress who made her broadcasting debut in ITMA in October 1943 in the seventh series. She had appeared in Shakespeare at the Regent's Park Open Air Theatre and in Me and My Girl at the Victoria Palace, toured in musical comedies and appeared in films before joining the cast of ITMA.
Kay Cavendish	3–5	Singer: leader of the Cavendish Three, a close harmony trio	Further information: Kay Cavendish
Jack Cooper	7	Singer	In the 1930s Jack Cooper was the singer with Jack Jackson's band, and later starred with Joan Heal in the London production of the musical High Button Shoes (1948). He was a frequent broadcaster.
Sam Costa	2	Singer; Lemuel	Further information: Sam Costa
Michelle de Lys	9	French girl	French actress. A child dancer at the Paris Opéra. One of the first artists to entertain French forces in Britain (becoming known as the "Sweetheart of the French Fighting Forces"). She had small film roles in Lisbon Story and Bedelia.
Maurice Denham	2	Announcer, Radio Fakenburg; Mrs Lola Tickle; Vodkin	Maurice Denham left to join the armed forces, but made a guest appearance as Lola Tickle in series 4 while on leave, in a confrontation between Handley's two charladies. Later known for playing Dudley Davenport in Much-Binding-in-the-Marsh among many other roles in a stage, screen and radio career lasting from 1934 to 1997. Further information: Maurice Denham
Cecilia Eddy	1	Cilly, the secretary	Canadian actress (1912–1958). She appeared frequently on BBC radio between 1939 and 1946, and on BBC television in 1939 in Once in a Lifetime, and in the early 1950s in Anne's Arrival and Dinner at Eight. She and Handley had appeared together on air earlier in 1939 in a show called That's Selling 'Em, as "a delightfully crazy team after the manner of George Burns and Gracie Allen".
Eric Egan	1	Vladivostooge	A South African actor and broadcaster (1903–1967). He was the physical fitness instructor on Radio Luxembourg's Doing the Daily Dozen in 1939. On the outbreak of war he returned to South Africa and joined the South African Broadcasting Corporation where he went on to become one of the country’s most popular radio announcers. He is not recorded as having broadcast on the BBC other than in the first four episodes of ITMA.
Tony Francis	10	Reg Raspberry	A dialect expert, mimic and impressionist, Tony Francis was born in Leicester, and came from a theatrical family. He began as a boy soprano before successfully taking up impressions. He joined ITMA from the Royal Air Force through one of the BBC's regular auditions. He mimicked skidding cars, trains, galloping horses and crowded pubs, but used no dialogue. According to Foster and Furst, "although his skills were considerable, they held up the pace of the show and he didn't stay for long".
Dino Galvani	4–8	Signor So-So	Further information: Dino Galvani
Lionel Gamlin	1	Quizmaster	Further information: Lionel Gamlin
Paula Green	3–8	Singer; Commercial traveller; "Ever So" girl	Paula Green (6 March 6, 1917 – 4 January 2012) was a popular wartime singer who performed on radio and travelled thousands of miles from Orkney to the Middle East to perform for British troops. Before joining ITMA she toured with the Joe Loss Orchestra. She was given her own radio show towards the end of the war. Her recording of "A Nightingale Sang in Berkeley Square" was played on BBC Radio nearly half a century later for the Queen Mother's 90th birthday.
Deryck Guyler	10–12	Dan Dungeon; Frisby Dyke; Percy Palaver; Sir Short Supply	Further information: Deryck Guyler
Joan Harben	10–12	Mona Lott; Upsey's owner	Joan Harben (1909–1953) was the daughter of the actress Mary Jerrold and sister of the cook and broadcaster Philip Harben. She won a scholarship and gold medal at RADA in 1927 and took leading roles at the Old Vic and in the West End. Despite her considerable theatre experience, Mona Lott in ITMA was only her second comedy role.
Sam Heppner	1	Presenter of "Man Bites Dog" feature	Sam Heppner (1914–1983) was a broadcaster, author, composer and lyricist.
Bryan Herbert	7	Butch (Sam Scram's brother)	Described in the press as "An Irishman with many voices at his command", Bryan Herbert came to ITMA after working at the Abbey Theatre, Dublin, and with the spin-off company The Irish Players. He began broadcasting in 1933, joined the BBC Repertory Company in 1942 and ITMA the following year.
Carleton Hobbs	9	Curly Kale; Major Mundy	Further information: Carleton Hobbs
Hattie Jacques	11–12	Ella Phant; Sophie Tuckshop	Further information: Hattie Jacques
Lind Joyce	9–12	Singer; Banjeleo; Pam Fairfechan (Sam's sister)	Lind Joyce (née Edith May Joyce, 1918–1971) was an actress and singer. She sang frequently on BBC radio programmes between 1942 and 1955, and was seen in the 1947 film Meet Me at Dawn.
Sydney Keith	4–8	Sam Scram	Sydney Keith (1900–1982) was born in the US, appeared on Broadway, went to Britain in a juvenile act in 1918 and spent most of his subsequent career there. He played in revue and musical comedy and toured with his wife, Sheila May, in a song and dance double act.
Vera Lennox	2, 5–6	Dotty; First Posh Lady	Vera Lennox (1903–1984) was a comedienne, singer and dancer. She appeared in many musical comedies and light non-musical plays in the 1920s and 30s, often with Leslie Henson, mostly in the West End, but also on Broadway. The Times praised her "spirited charm".
Diana Morrison	8–12	Miss Hotchkiss; Nanny; Aunt Sally	The actress Diana Morrison (1914–2000) started in show-business in the chorus at the Gaiety Theatre. She appeared frequently on BBC radio and television from the 1930s onwards. Like Sam Costa and Maurice Denham, after the end of ITMA she appeared in Much-Binding-in-the-Marsh.
Hugh Morton	9–12	Basil Backwards; Josiah Creep; Brigadier Dear; Sam Fairfechan; Wamba M'Boojah; Mr Sninch of Puff; Scraping	Further information: Hugh Morton (actor)
Mary O'Farrell	9	Nurse Riff-Rafferty; Ruby Rockcake; Lady Sonely	Mary O'Farrell (1892–1968) was an actress who worked mostly for the BBC. Starting her career in the West End, she first broadcast in 1923 in a production with Henry Ainley, and was later a long-time member of the BBC Repertory Company. Among her best-known roles was the eponymous "composeress" Hilda Tablet in Henry Reed's series of radio comedies between 1953 and 1959.
Horace Percival	3–8	Ali Oop; Cecil; The Diver; Whats'isname; Percy Pintable	After success in musical comedy in the 1920s the actor Horace Percival (1886–1961) concentrated on radio work, in which, according to The Times he displayed considerable versatility. Before joining the ITMA team in 1942 he appeared in radio plays, operettas, musicals, variety and features like the Scrapbook programmes. After his seasons with ITMA he featured prominently in Here's Howerd with Frankie Howerd and from 1950 to 1958 in Life with the Lyons on television.
Ann Rich	8	Singer	Took over singing slot from Paula Green in mid-series 8 (March 1945). Also a regular in the Sunday Serenade programme, and sang in many other shows between 1942 and 1948. She later appeared in the West End in The Pajama Game.
Pat Rignold	5	Singer	Pat Rignold was one of the singing trio The Cavendish Three, along with Kay Cavendish (above) and Dorothy Carless. She was also a comedienne, with a style described by the BBC as "dumb and scatty". She was the sister of the conductor Hugo Rignold.
Bill Stephens	6–7	Admiral; Comical Chris; The Mad Photographer	Bill Stephens began his career in seaside concert parties and music hall. In 1942 he became a regular in Jollyoliday, a BBC programme for the armed forces. In 1947 he took on the management of the New Market Theatre, Aylesbury, which had been used as a cinema before the war and as a food warehouse during it. Stephens restored the theatre and established a repertory company there.
Dorothy Summers	3–8	Mrs Mopp; Second Posh Lady	Dorothy Summers, née Daisy Sarah Summers (1883–1964), was born in Birmingham and as soon as she left school embarked on a show-business career, first in a Pierrot troupe and then, for 14 years, touring the Commonwealth with various theatrical companies. From 1930 onwards her career was mostly in broadcasting. After ITMA she continued to appear on radio and between 1950 and 1958 she made several television appearances.
Jack Train	2–6, 8–12	Bookham; Bowing; Claude; Colonel Chinstrap; Funf; Fusspot; Farmer Jollop; Hari Kari; Lefty; Prattle; Luke Slippy; Mark Time; Town Clerk	Further information: Jack Train
Molly Weir	10	Mrs Mackintosh; Tattie Mackintosh	Further information: Molly Weir
Clarence Wright	3–5, 9	Commercial Traveller; Man from the Ministry; Inspector Squirt	Clarence Wright (1908–1992) was born in Bournemouth, where he sang as a choirboy and later played the violin in the Bournemouth Municipal Orchestra. He subsequently played in the Savoy Orpheans, and from there turned to acting. He considered his years working with Handley the most rewarding of his career, and the two became close friends. Wright organised the memorial tribute to Handley at St Paul's Cathedral in January 1949 and campaigned for 25 years to have a blue plaque placed on the wall of Handley's house in London.
Fred Yule	3–12	Atlas; Bigga Banga; Johann Bull; Norman the Doorman; Andrew Geekie; George Gorge; Mr Grooves; Willy Nilly; Walter Wetwhite	Further information: Fred Yule

Sources: Foster and Furst (1999); Gifford (1985) and Kavanagh (1975).

== Catchphrases ==
The following are among the best known of the catchphrases from the show. Some became common currency among the general public for many years; others were more ephemeral. One—"TTFN"—remained in frequent use throughout the second half of the 20th century and into the 21st, latterly being used in chat rooms, emails and newsgroups to sign off a message or posting. "It's being so cheerful that keeps me going" also remains in use, seen in British newspapers many times in the first two decades of the 21st century.

Phrase	Character
After you, Claude.	Cecil
Boss, boss, sumpin' terrible's happened!	Sam Scram
... but I'm all right now.	Sophie Tuckshop
Can I do you now, sir?	Mrs Mopp
Defense de cracher!	Radio Fakenburg announcer
Doh! (Note: Miss Hotchkiss's "Doh!" is—with "I don't mind if I do" and "TTFN"—one of three ITMA citations in The Oxford English Dictionary; it appears a few lines above Homer Simpson's "D'oh!")	Miss Hotchkiss
Don't forget the diver!	Diver
Down, Upsey!	unnamed bossy character, to her small dog
Every penny makes the water warmer.	Diver
Friday! Friday!	Handley
Good morning! Nice day!	Commercial traveller
I always do my best for all my gentlemen.	Lola Tickle
I don't mind if I do.	Colonel Chinstrap
I go—I come back.	Ali Oop
I'll have to ask me dad.	Mark Time
I'm going down now, sir.	Diver
It's being so cheerful that keeps me going.	Mona Lott
It's me noives!	Lefty
I've brought this for you, sir.	Mrs Mopp
Lovely grub!	George Gorge
Me? In my state of health?	Atlas
Mine's a Persico.	Radio Fakenburg advertising slogan
Most irregular!	Fusspot
No, after you, Cecil.	Claude
Notting at all! Notting at all!	Signor So-So
TTFN.	Mrs Mopp
Well, all right, well, all right!	The Cavendish Three
What a common boy!	Handley
Wish I had as many shillings.	Handley

== Reputation ==
The Times commented that ITMA "achieved a humour of universal appeal and found eager listeners in every rank of society". A 2002 history of Britain in the first half of the 20th century called the show "the most celebrated wartime radio programme ... praised by intellectuals for its surrealism and wordplay, but loved by the mass listening public for its delirious silliness". The size of the audience was unprecedented; one historian records that more than sixteen million people listened to ITMA every week", and another that "a staggering 40 per cent of the population" regularly tuned in. But the show was not without its critics. Took quotes hostile letters to Radio Times: "Why should the producers in the Variety department assume that the listeners are a body of half-wits? The puns served up last night in "ITMA" were an insult to anyone's intelligence" (1939) and "I am constantly amazed by the number of otherwise intelligent people who rave about this programme. I have tried to discover some sort of level of culture or intelligence from which ITMA fans are drawn—but in vain" (1944). In 1947 a Scottish MP, Jean Mann, referred to Handley—or his character—as a "twerp". (Note: "The greatest insult of all to Scotland is the introduction of a Scots girl to 'Itma' who is supposed to be falling head over heels for a little 'twerp' called 'The Governor'". Mann's comment was believed to be the first time the word "twerp" was uttered in the House of Commons:)

In the show's early days critical response was not uniformly enthusiastic. The radio critic of The Manchester Guardian wrote in December 1939 that amusing as the show could be, "it is beginning to pall by its regularity and its attachment to the same style of humour". (Note: Another critic hoped in 1940 that ITMA and Funf could be "painlessly removed" from the BBC's schedules.) By the end of the last series, in 1949, writers in the same paper were comparing ITMA to the comedies of Aristophanes and Ben Jonson, as "a brilliant, penetrating commentary on our times ... enlightening millions of people—a cunningly dispensed and cleverly administered medicine for the lesser ills of society". A contemporary critic observed that ITMA was entirely original and avoided stock characters:

There are neither drawling Bayswater millionaires nor drooling Aberdonian wags nor, thank Hackney, any boy Cockney. These characters are novel. They gibber, splutter, stutter, stagger, suffer from amnesia, paranoia, claustrophobia, dyspepsia, dementia, and delirium tremens. A whirling dream-world, the happy (and unhappily rare) one where no anxieties matter and where terror figures are laughed away by Daddy Handley's telephonic ridicule.

Historians of the show acknowledge that the topicality that was one of ITMA's strengths has prevented it from wearing well. Kavanagh himself admitted that reading his old scripts he could not work out what some of the jokes were about. Even while the show was still running, its producer, Worsley, said that recordings of earlier series "seem curiously dusty and faded, like an album of old photographs".

In a 2013 study of British comedy, John Fisher emphasises the influence of ITMA on later comedy shows by virtue of "its speed of delivery, its quick-fire succession of short scenes and verbal non-sequiturs, its surrealist overtones, all breaking away from the traditional music hall sketch orientation of Band Waggon, and anticipating Take It From Here, and even more so The Goon Show and Round the Horne".

== Notes and references ==
=== Sources ===
==== Books ====
- Barfe, Louis (2009). Turned Out Nice Again: The Story of British Light Entertainment. London: Atlantic. ISBN 978-1-8435-4381-7.
- Briggs, Asa (1985). The BBC: The First Fifty Years. Oxford: Oxford University Press. ISBN 978-0-1921-2971-0.
- Curran, James; Seaton, Jean (2002). Power Without Responsibility: Press, Broadcasting and the Internet in Britain (fifth ed.). London: Routledge. ISBN 978-1-134-82330-7.
- Davison, Peter (1982). Contemporary Drama and the Popular Dramatic Tradition in England. London: Macmillan. ISBN 978-0-3332-8083-6.
- Dibbs, Martin (2019). Radio Fun and the BBC Variety Department, 1922–67. London: Springer. ISBN 978-3-319-95609-1.
- Fisher, John (2013). Funny Way to Be a Hero. London: Preface. ISBN 978-1-84809-313-3.
- Foster, Andy; Furst, Steve (1999). Radio Comedy, 1938–1968: A Guide to 30 Years of Wonderful Wireless. London: Virgin Books. ISBN 978-0-86369-960-3.
- Freedman, Jean R. (2015). Whistling in the Dark: Memory and Culture in Wartime London. Lexington, KY: The University Press of Kentucky. ISBN 978-0-8131-4816-8. (subscription required)
- Gifford, Denis (1985). The Golden Age of Radio: An Illustrated Companion. London: Batsford. ISBN 978-0-7134-4234-2.
- Grundy, Bill (1976). That Man: A Memory of Tommy Handley. London: Elm Tree Books. ISBN 978-0-241-89344-9.
- Kavanagh, P. J. (1975). Introduction. The ITMA Years: Scripts. By Kavanagh, Ted. London: Futura Publications. pp. 9–12. ISBN 978-0-86007-245-4.
- Kavanagh, Ted (1952). Colonel Chinstrap. London: Evans Brothers. OCLC 13674955.
- Kynaston, David (2010). Austerity Britain 1945–1951. London: Bloomsbury. ISBN 978-1-4088-0907-5.
- Merriman, Andy (2007). Hattie: The Authorised Biography of Hattie Jacques (Kindle ed.). London: Aurum Press. ISBN 978-1-84513-817-2.
- Neale, Stephen; Krutnik, Frank (1990). Popular Film and Television Comedy. London: Routledge. ISBN 978-0-415-04691-6.
- Nicholas, Siân (2002). "Being British: Creeds and Cultures". In Robbins, Keith (ed.). The British Isles, 1901–1951. Oxford: Oxford University Press. pp. 103–136. ISBN 978-0-19-873195-5.
- Partridge, Eric (1992). Dictionary of Catch Phrases. London: Scarborough House. ISBN 978-1-4616-6040-8.
- Rawson, Hugh; Miner, Margaret (2005). The Oxford Dictionary of American Quotations (second ed.). Oxford: Oxford University Press. ISBN 978-0-19-516823-5.
- Rees, Nigel (1994). Dictionary of Catch Phrases (second ed.). London: Bookmark. OCLC 1073788654.
- Took, Barry (1981). Laughter in the Air. London: Robson Books and the BBC. ISBN 978-0-86051-149-6.
- Wearing, J. P. (2014). The London Stage 1950–1959: A Calendar of Productions, Performers, and Personnel. Lanham: Rowman & Littlefield. ISBN 978-0-8108-9308-5.
- Wilmut, Roger; Grafton, Jimmy (1977) [1976]. The Goon Show Companion. London: Robson Books. ISBN 978-0-7221-9182-8.
- Worsley, Francis (1949). ITMA 1939–1948. London: Vox Mundi. OCLC 18240961.

==== Episodes ====
- ITMA. Series 7. Episode 14. 6 January 1944. BBC. Home Service.
- ITMA. Series 10. Episode 19. 23 January 1947. BBC. Home Service.
- ITMA. Series 12. Episode 4. 14 October 1948. BBC. Home Service.

==== Gramophone records ====
- Askey, Arthur (1942). The Flu-Germ (78 rpm record). London: His Master's Voice. BD 1002.
- Memories of I.T.M.A. (LP record). London: Oriole. 1951. OCLC 155203905. MG 20032.

==== Journals ====
- Mann, Jean, MP for Coatbridge (19 February 1947). "Civil Estimates, Supplementary Estimate, 1946–47: Broadcasting". Parliamentary Debates (Hansard). Vol. 433. Parliament of the United Kingdom: House of Commons. col. 1249.
- Thurlow, Richard (January 1999). "The Evolution of the Mythical British Fifth Column, 1939–46". Twentieth Century British History. 10 (4): 477–498. doi:10.1093/tcbh/10.4.477.
- Took, Barry (2004). "Kavanagh, Henry Edward [Ted] (1892–1958)". Oxford Dictionary of National Biography (online ed.). Oxford University Press. doi:10.1093/ref:odnb/65823. (Subscription, Wikipedia Library access or UK public library membership required.)
- Took, Barry (2011). "Handley, Thomas Reginald [Tommy] (1892–1949)". Oxford Dictionary of National Biography (online ed.). Oxford University Press. doi:10.1093/ref:odnb/33682. (Subscription, Wikipedia Library access or UK public library membership required.)
- Wintour, Charles (2008). "Gunn, Herbert Smith [Bert] (1903–1962)". Oxford Dictionary of National Biography (online ed.). Oxford University Press. doi:10.1093/ref:odnb/48275. (Subscription, Wikipedia Library access or UK public library membership required.)

==== Magazines ====
- "At Last! The true story of Humphrey Chinstrap (Col. Retd.)". The Radio Times. No. 1572. 25 December 1953. p. 40. ISSN 0033-8060.
- "In Town Tonight". The Radio Times. No. 678. 10 October 1936. p. 76. ISSN 0033-8060.
- "In Town Tonight". The Radio Times. No. 1147. 21 September 1945. p. 18. ISSN 0033-8060.
- "ITMA". The Sketch. 16 April 1947. p. 192.
- "It's That Man Again". The Radio Times. No. 823. 7 July 1939. p. 44. ISSN 0033-8060.
- "I want you to meet Gilhooly". The Radio Times. No. 1405. 29 September 1950. p. 5. ISSN 0033-8060.
- Kavanagh, P. J. (18 January 2019). "Round the Horne ... Revisited". The Oldie. p. 21. Archived from the original on 27 June 2020.
- "Our Miss Rignold". The Radio Times. No. 984. 7 August 1942. p. 11. ISSN 0033-8060.
- "Star Variety (by arrangement with George Black) 'ITMA (It's That Man Again !)". The Radio Times. No. 867. 10 May 1940. p. 38. ISSN 0033-8060.
- "Tommy Handley Introduces a Grand 'ITMA' Concert". The Radio Times. No. 971. 8 May 1942. p. 10. ISSN 0033-8060.
- "Tommy Handley in a Grand ITMA Concert". The Radio Times. No. 1010. 5 February 1943. p. 7. ISSN 0033-8060.
- "V-ITMA". The Radio Times. No. 1128. 11 May 1945. p. 6. ISSN 0033-8060.
- "Well for Santa Claus". The Radio Times. No. 1055. 17 December 1943. p. 22. ISSN 0033-8060.
- "Whither Tomtopia?". The Radio Times. No. 1197. 6 September 1946. p. 14. ISSN 0033-8060.
- Worsley, Francis (7 July 1939). "It's That Man Again". Radio Times. p. 10.

==== Newspapers ====
- "Aeroplane Dive". Liverpool Echo. 6 September 1919. p. 4.
- "B.B.C. Comedian Called a 'Twerp'". The Canberra Times. 21 February 1947. p. 1.
- "Buying ITMA a coffee". Liverpool Echo. 7 September 1944. p. 4.
- "Clarence Wright". The Times. 21 March 1992. p. 17.
- "Col Chinstrap Speaking". Birmingham Daily Gazette. 14 June 1956. p. 4.
- Davalle, Peter (5 September 1988). "Fun and fundamentals". The Times. p. 21.
- "Dominion Status". Birmingham Daily Gazette. 28 August 1946. p. 2.
- "Don't Forget the Diver!". Liverpool Echo. 24 January 1930. p. 5.
- Grahame, Charles (27 November 1976). "The master of the rapid-fire radio show". The Sydney Morning Herald. p. 15.
- "Have a Thought!". Liverpool Echo. 22 January 1929. p. 10.
- "Holiday Week Variety". Hull Daily Mail. 5 April 1947. p. 4.
- "Jean Capra of the B.B.C. ITMA Team". The Dubbo Liberal and Macquarie Advocate. 12 March 1946. p. 3.
- "London Hippodrome". The Times. 23 December 1948. p. 6.
- "The Man Who Was Thursday". The Manchester Guardian. 10 January 1949. p. 4.
- "Maurice Denham". The Times. 26 July 2002. p. 31.
- "Miss Dorothy Summers: 'Can I Do You Now, Sir?'". The Times. 14 January 1964. p. 11.
- "Miss Guided". The Daily Herald. 28 August 1946. p. 3.
- "Miss Joan Harben". The Times. 20 October 1953. p. 10.
- "Miss M. O'Farrell". The Times. 12 February 1968. p. 10.
- "Miss Vera Lennox". The Times. 15 January 1985. p. 16.
- "Mr Fred Yule". The Times. 13 December 1982. p. 14.
- "Mr Horace Percival: Gifted Actor of Radio Comedy". The Times. 10 November 1961. p. 17.
- "Mr Jack Train'". The Times. 20 December 1966. p. 10.
- "Mr Sam Heppner". The Times. 4 June 1983. p. 10.
- "Mr Tommy Handley". The Times. 10 January 1949. p. 7.
- "New Voices and Features in ITMA". Aberdeen Evening Express. 29 September 1943. p. 5.
- "Non-Stop Revue". The Times. 10 February 1943. p. 6.
- "Paula Green". The Times. 11 February 2012. p. 94. (subscription required)
- "Peter Geekie". Liverpool Echo. 7 September 1944. p. 4.
- "Review of Broadcasting". The Manchester Guardian. 20 December 1939. p. 8.
- "Seeing the fashions at New Brighton". Liverpool Echo. 14 July 1914. p. 4.
- "Sydney Keith". The Times. 22 November 1982. p. 14.
- "The Tivoli To Reopen". The Times. 18 February 1943. p. 6.
- Blewett, Denis (28 September 1956). "Train takes a sentimental journey". The Aberdeen Evening Express. p. 6.
- Grahame, Charles (27 November 1976). "The master of the rapid-fire radio pun show". The Sydney Morning Herald. p. 15.
- Harrisson, Tom (9 January 1944). "Radio". The Observer. p. 2.
- Wynn, H. H. (15 January 1949). "ITMA". The Manchester Guardian. p. 4.

==== Websites ====
- "Ann Rich". BBC Genome. BBC.
- "Bill Stephens". BBC Genome. BBC.
- "Cecilia Eddy". BBC Genome. BBC.
- "Colonel Chinstrap". BBC Genome. BBC.
- "Colonel Chinstrap and Major Mundy: Cover points at the Test Match". BBC Genome. BBC.
- "doh". Oxford English Dictionary (online ed.). Oxford University Press. (Subscription or participating institution membership required.)
- "Eric Egan". BBC Genome. BBC.
- "Eric Egan". Encyclopaedia of South African Theatre.
- Hendy, David. "Morale and Music". BBC.
- "Hilda Tablet". BBC Genome. BBC.
- "I don't mind if I do". British Library. Archived from the original on 8 October 2022.
- "ITMA 1945". BBC Genome. BBC.
- "It's being so cheerful that keeps me going". Newsbank. (subscription required)
- "It's That Man Again (1943)". British Film Institute. Archived from the original on 23 March 2019.
- "Jack Cooper". BBC Genome. BBC.
- "Lind Joyce". BBC Genome. BBC.
- "Lind Joyce". British Film Institute. Archived from the original on 15 June 2020.
- "Michelle de Lys". British Film Institute. Archived from the original on 15 June 2020.
- "mind". Oxford English Dictionary (online ed.). Oxford University Press. (Subscription or participating institution membership required.)
- "Mrs Mopp". BBC Genome. BBC.
- Peters, Kevin (26 July 2002). "Aylesbury Repertory Company" (PDF). Aylesbury Town Council.
- "TTFN". Oxford Reference. Oxford University Press. (subscription required)
