= Jack Train =

British actor (1902–1966)

Jack Train, 1942

Jack Train (28 November 1902 – 19 December 1966) was a British comic actor best known for his appearances as a variety of eccentric characters in the BBC radio series It's That Man Again (ITMA).

== Life and career ==
Train was born in Plymouth, Devon, on 28 November 1902. During his service in the Royal Navy in the First World War he began performing as an entertainer. Leslie Hore-Belisha, later Minister for War, saw his act when he was entertaining sailors at Devonport, advised him to turn professional and arranged an audition for him. In 1928 he made his first West End appearance, in a Herbert Farjeon revue called Many Happy Returns. His only stage appearance in a serious play was in Journey's End, after which he spent five years as the straight man to Nervo and Knox. He first broadcast in 1924 and was heard on the air frequently, mostly in light entertainment but from time to time in serious drama. In October 1939 he became one of the members of the ITMA company supporting its star, Tommy Handley. Train was seriously ill in 1943 and had to miss one series of the show, but otherwise he remained a stalwart until Handley's sudden death in 1949 put an end to ITMA. The Times said of Train:

The multi-voiced Train was a variety of unforgettable personalities – the German Funf, who was both fundamentally menacing and naturally funny, always worsted because a streak of toiling, teutonic literalness in his mental composition made it almost impossible for him to understand what was said to him, Claude, the removal man and general dogsbody, whose extreme courtesy was equalled only by that of his partner, Cecil, and, finally, Colonel Chinstrap, the sound of whose voice carried the unmistakable aroma of vintage port and brandy, and whose speciality was less a drinker's expertise than a drinker's insatiable appetite and extreme cunning in satisfying it.

Train said he based his characterisation of the Colonel on an Indian Army officer he once met in a golf-club bar.

After ITMA, Train was a long serving panellist on the radio show Twenty Questions, in which, according to The Times, he "showed himself to be capable of wild flights of fantasy without a script writer to prompt him". He was the subject of This Is Your Life in 1957 when he was surprised by Eamonn Andrews at the BBC Television Theatre.

Train appears as a character, played by himself, in the 1950 crime film The Twenty Questions Murder Mystery, in which he becomes involved in solving a series of murders connected with the radio show.

He made two cameo appearances in The Goon Show as Colonel Chinstrap: one in "Shifting Sands" (Series 7, programme 17, first broadcast 24/1/1957) and the other in "Who Is Pink Oboe?" (Series 9, programme 11, first broadcast 12/1/1959). In 1958, Train was the host and interviewer for The Stars Rise in The West, an opening night programme for TWW, the new ITV station for South Wales and the West of England.

Train died in London on 19 December 1966.

== Films ==
- The Nursemaid Who Disappeared (1939)
- King Arthur Was a Gentleman (1942)
- It's That Man Again (1943)
- Miss London Ltd. (1943)
- Gaiety George (1946)
- New Town (1948)
- Colonel Bogey (1948)
- Your Very Good Health (1948)
- Alice in Wonderland (1949)
- Twenty Question Murder Mystery (1950)
- Catacombs (1965)
