= Pinwright's Progress =

British television sitcom

- Genre: Sitcom
- Starring: James Hayter; Clarence Wright; Sara Gregory; Daphne Maddox
- Country of origin: United Kingdom
- No. of episodes: 10

Production
- Running time: 30 minutes

Original release
- Network: BBC Television Service
- Release: 29 November 1946 – 16 May 1947

Pinwright's Progress is a British television sitcom that aired on the BBC Television Service from 1946 to 1947, and was the world's first regular half-hour televised sitcom. The ten episodes, which aired fortnightly in alternation with Kaleidoscope, were broadcast live from the BBC studios at Alexandra Palace. Still photographs are all that remain of the show's transmitted form.

Pinwright's Progress was written by Rodney Hobson, produced and directed by John Glyn-Jones, and the script editor was Ted Kavanagh, who also wrote the BBC radio comedy series It's That Man Again.

== Cast ==
- James Hayter as Mr. J. Pinwright
- Clarence Wright as Aubrey
- Sara Gregory as Sally Doolittle
- Daphne Maddox as Miss Peasbody
- Doris Palmer as Mrs. Sigsbee
- Leonard Sharp as Ralph
- Benita Lydal as Mrs. Rackstraw
- Charles Irwin as Salesman
- Jill Christie as Pinwright's daughter

== Outline ==
J. Pinwright is the proprietor of a small shop. He has a hated rival, and his staff only add to his problems by attempting to be helpful. Ralph, the messenger boy, is a deaf octogenarian.

== Episodes ==
Episode 1 (29 November 1946): J. Pinwright is the proprietor of the smallest multiple store in the world. He has a pretty daughter and a hated rival, and his difficulties are increased by his staff's efforts to be helpful.

Episode 2 (13 December 1946): Christmas is coming and so, not to be beaten by his hated rival, the owner of Macgillygally's Stores, Mr. Pinwright prepares his Christmas Bazaar. There is trouble though, partly occasioned by the sudden appearance of three robed and bearded Father Christmases – one of whom is a fugitive from the law. Mrs. Sigsbee, however, lends tone to the proceedings by appearing in costume as the Fairy Queen, and all ends well – or does it?

Episode 3 (27 December 1946): Mr. Pinwright intends to lure post-Christmas shoppers by a handsome gift to the store's fiftieth customer – cigars or nylons, cash customers only considered. In addition, he opens a brand new snack bar, but some pills palmed off on him by that cunning salesman throw all his plans into confusion.

Episode 4 (10 January 1947): "Cash Crisis".

Episode 5 (24 January 1947): "Fashions and Pashuns".

Episode 6 (7 February 1947): "Strained Relations".

Episode 7 (21 February 1947): "The Gypsy’s Warning".

Episode 8 (21 March 1947): "Gone to Seed".

Episode 9 (2 May 1947): "Radio Activity".

Episode 10 (16 May 1947): "Staggered Holidays".

== See also ==
- British sitcom
