= It's That Man Again (film) =

- Opening title card
- Directed by: Walter Forde
- Screenplay by: Howard Irving Young & Ted Kavanagh
- Based on: the BBC radio series by Ted Kavanagh
- Produced by: Edward Black
- Starring: Tommy Handley; Greta Gynt; Jack Train
- Cinematography: Basil Emmott
- Edited by: R. E. Dearing
- Music by: Hans May (original music); Louis Levy (musical direction)
- Production company: Gainsborough Pictures
- Distributed by: General Film Distributors (UK)
- Release date: 10 February 1943
- Running time: 84 minutes
- Country: United Kingdom
- Language: English

It's That Man Again is a 1943 British comedy film directed by Walter Forde and starring Tommy Handley, Greta Gynt and Jack Train. It was written by Howard Irving Young and Ted Kavanagh based on the BBC radio show It's That Man Again. In the film, the mayor of a small town lends his assistance to some drama students.

== Plot ==
The disreputable mayor of the small town of Foaming at the Mouth gambles the civic accounts and wins a bombed-out local theatre. He steals the rights to a new play which he stages in an attempt to save the financial situation. However, local drama students he has cheated turn up and try to ruin the show.

== Cast ==
- Tommy Handley as Mayor of "Foaming at the Mouth"
- Jack Train as Lefty and Funf
- Sydney Keith as Sam Scram
- Horace Percival as Alley-Oop / Cecil
- Dorothy Summers as Mrs. Mopp
- Dino Galvani as Soso
- Clarence Wright as Clarence
- Leonard Sharp as Claude
- Greta Gynt as Stella Ferris
- Claude Bailey as C.B. Cato
- Franklyn Bennett as Hilary Craven
- Vera Frances as Daisy
- Richard George as Uncle Percy
- Jean Kent as Kitty (uncredited)

== Critical reception ==
The Monthly Film Bulletin wrote: "This play is a film reconstruction of the well-known Tommy Handley ITMA broadcasts. The well-known wireless gags are put over to the accompaniment of rollicking music-hall burlesque. The show will please all those who want to see what kind of bodies are attached to the voices on the air, and who like crazy, inconsequential material."

Picture Show wrote: "Grand, uproarious crazy comedy ... Don't miss it."

TV Guide wrote: "This wartime comedy has some genuinely funny moments but never rises to the fevered pitch that would really give it the needed craziness. The story is taken from a delightfully loopy British radio show, but the translation to screen just doesn't work".

Radio Times called it "disappointing," commenting on Tommy Handley, "the Liverpool-born comic's fast-talking style felt forced when shackled to the demands of a storyline, and his weaknesses as a physical comedian restricted the type of business he was able to carry off. Thus, while casting him as the devious mayor of Foaming-at-the-Mouth seemed sound enough, the events that follow his acquisition of a bombed-out London theatre feel like so much padding."

The Spinning Image wrote: "if you approached it as a British predecessor to the Hollywood cult comedy Hellzapoppin' then you would have some idea of what to expect, with Handley demonstrating his dazzling ability with wordplay, reeling off the puns at a dizzying rate...Anarchic was the word to apply here, with the show they manage to get off the ground for the finale surprisingly hilarious in its throwing in everything but the kitchen sink style of laughs; before that it was patchily amusing, but engaging enough. As a record of a comedy phenomenon – twenty-two million listeners, as the titles proclaim – this was invaluable."
