= Tommy Handley =

British comedian (1892–1949)

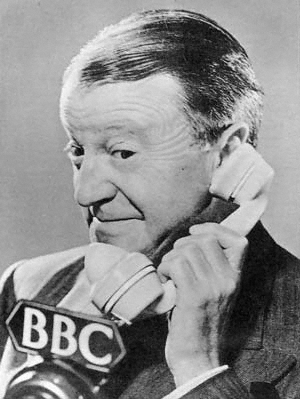
- Born: Thomas Reginald Handley; 17 January 1892; Toxteth Park, Liverpool, Lancashire, England
- Died: 9 January 1949 (aged 56); London, England
- Occupation: Comedian

Thomas Reginald Handley (17 January 1892 – 9 January 1949) was an English comedian, best known for the BBC radio programme It's That Man Again ("ITMA") which ran between 1939 and 1949.

Born in Liverpool, Lancashire, Handley went on the stage in his teens and after military service in the First World War he established himself as a comedian and singer on the music hall circuit. He became nationally known as a pioneer broadcaster. From 1924 onwards he was frequently heard on BBC variety programmes as a solo entertainer and an actor in sketches. In the 1930s Handley frequently performed on air with the comedian Ronald Frankau in a popular comedy act as "Mr Murgatroyd and Mr Winterbottom".

Handley's greatest success came in 1939 with the BBC radio comedy show It's That Man Again, which, after an uncertain start, caught the British public's imagination and reached an unprecedentedly large audience. He starred as the good-natured, fast-talking anchor-man around whom a cast of eccentric comic characters revolved. The show was credited for its important part in keeping up morale in Britain during the Second World War.

Handley died suddenly in 1949, and ITMA was immediately cancelled.

== Life and career ==
=== Early years ===
Handley was born at Toxteth Park, Liverpool, on 17 January 1892, the son of John Handley and his wife, Sarah Ann, née Pearson. John Handley, who is believed to have run a dairy business, died while Tommy was a baby. After leaving school Handley earned his living as a salesman, but developed a reputation as an amateur singer. He was determined to go into show business and became a professional singer in 1916. He toured briefly in the operetta The Maid of the Mountains, before being called up in 1917 into the Royal Naval Air Service. During the last two years of the First World War, he served in a kite balloon section and subsequently in a concert party entertaining the troops.

After the war, Handley auditioned for the impresario Rupert D'Oyly Carte, and impressed him with his performance of the Major-General's patter song from The Pirates of Penzance. Carte wrote to offer him a place in a new D'Oyly Carte touring company, but by the time the invitation arrived Handley was contractually committed elsewhere. He toured in musical comedy and in the music halls as a comedian and singer. He became known in the leading role of the officer in the sketch The Disorderly Room, a parody of military life, written by Eric Blore, in which military disciplinary proceedings were comically set to popular tunes of the day. The sketch remained in his repertory from 1921 to 1941, and according to Handley's biographer Ted Kavanagh "it must have been played on every music-hall stage in the country". In 1924 The Disorderly Room was included in the programme for the Royal Command Performance at the London Coliseum. The show was broadcast, and marked the beginning of Handley's radio career.

=== BBC ===
Handley was successful on the halls, but he was not a major star. His career took off as a broadcaster. He was a regular performer on the BBC from 1924 onwards – his biographer Barry Took calls him "a mainstay of its variety programmes" – as a solo entertainer, an actor in sketches and occasionally a producer. Much of his material was written by Ted Kavanagh, who devised comic monologues for him and worked with him on the broadcast revues that paved the way for their greatest success, It's That Man Again.

In 1929 Handley married the actress and singer Jean Allistone (Rosalind Jean Henshall, née Allistone, 1897–1958) whom he had met at the BBC. She had trained under Sir Herbert Tree, appeared in revues and musical comedies and, from 1925, was a pioneer broadcaster. The couple had no children.

Between 1935 and 1949 Handley frequently performed on air with the comedian Ronald Frankau in a comedy act as "Mr Murgatroyd and Mr Winterbottom" ("Two minds with not a single thought"). Together they wrote and delivered what Took describes as "a sophisticated crosstalk of quickfire word and idea association"; the combination of the Old Etonian Frankau's patrician tones as Murgatroyd and Handley's fast-talking Scouse patter as Winterbottom became one of the BBC's most popular comedy features. Took quotes a typical example of Murgatroyd and Winterbottom's rapid cross-talk, which concludes:

Murgatroyd: Yes, Mr Winterbottom, we must always study the listener – the Mr and Mrs Everymans
Winterbottom: The Jones and Smiths.
Murgatroyd: The Robinsons and Browns.
Winterbottom: The Gilbert and Sullivans.
Murgatroyd: The Tristan and Isoldes.
Winterbottom: The Hengists and Horsas.
Murgatroyd: The Moodys and Sankeys.
Winterbottom: And the Darbys and Joans.
Murgatroyd: Cut out the Joans and let's think of the Derby. What have you backed?
Winterbottom: My car into a shop window. Joan a car?
Murgatroyd: Cut out the Joan and let's think of the Derby again.

Murgatroyd and Winterbottom became so popular that the performers' wives – Jean Allistone and Renee Roberts – were invited to make several broadcasts of their own as "Mrs Murgatroyd and Mrs Winterbottom".

=== ITMA ===
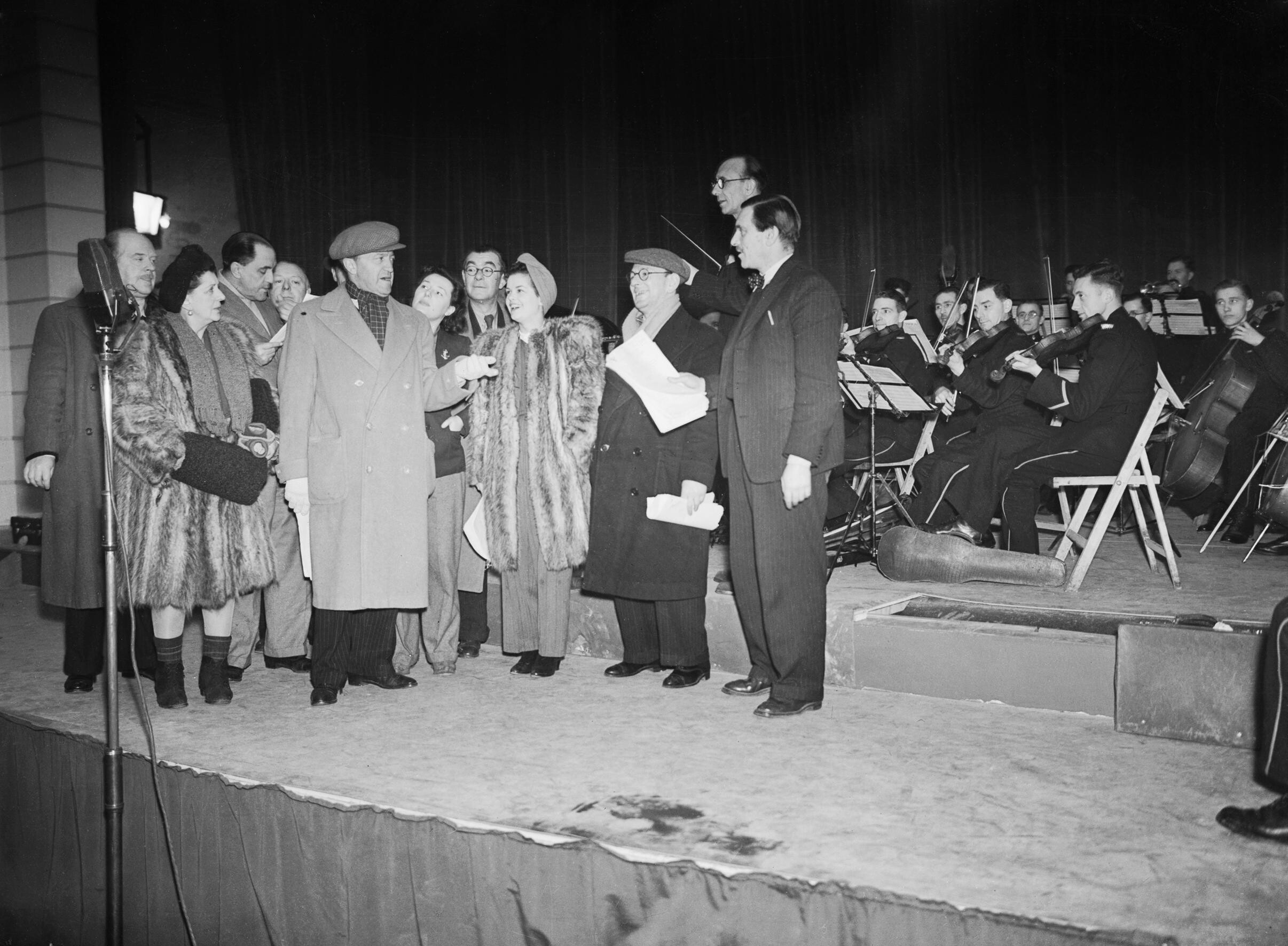
Handley rehearsing with the ITMA cast and the Royal Marines band during a visit to the Home Fleet at Scapa Flow, January 1944

Towards the end of the 1930s Handley and Kavanagh were, in Took's words, "at a crossroads", in need of "a new direction in which to move and a new stimulus to drive them forward". The new direction and stimulus came with the BBC's need for a replacement for Band Waggon, an immensely successful hour-long variety programme starring Arthur Askey and Richard Murdoch. Askey's career was developing elsewhere, on stage and screen, and the 1939 run of the show was its last. Kavanagh and Handley, together with the BBC producer Francis Worsley, conceived a successor. Instead of the one-off sketches to which Handley and Kavanagh were accustomed, the new show would be 45 minutes in length. The three colleagues agreed to set the series on a pirate radio ship, with Handley in charge, surrounded by and coping with a cast of miscellaneous oddballs. The title was It's That Man Again – a phrase borrowed from The Daily Express which used it as a headline for an article about Adolf Hitler. The series was launched in July 1939, but made little impression before its initial run came to an end shortly before the Second World War started.

At the outbreak of the war the BBC, knowing that its London headquarters at Broadcasting House would be a principal target for enemy bombing, put into effect plans to move much of its activity to other locations. Many of the corporation's programmes were broadcast from places such as Bristol and Weston-super-Mare in the West Country and Evesham and Bedford in the Midlands. The BBC Variety department was moved first to Bristol and, in 1941, to Bangor in North Wales. ITMA resumed, its running time reduced to 30 minutes, and now Handley and his colleagues caught the public mood with shows that genially satirised many of the irritating features of wartime existence and generated catchphrases that became common currency. Handley was cast as the Minister of Aggravation and Mysteries at the Office of Twerps, surrounded by a cast of bizarre characters; they included, at various times, the bibulous Colonel Chinstrap, the morose Mona Lott, the incompetent German spy Funf, the formidable charlady Mrs Mopp, the dubious vendor Ali Oop, and the ultra-polite broker's men Claude and Cecil. The supposed locale and the cast of characters changed over the years, but the formula – Handley as the benign master of ceremonies beset by a gallery of comic eccentrics – remained constant.

ITMA became an enormous success, popular with all classes of society. By the middle of the war, an unprecedented forty per cent of the British population was tuning in to ITMA. It had the distinction of becoming the first radio show to give a royal command performance: early in 1942 a special edition of ITMA was performed at Windsor Castle for Princess Elizabeth's birthday. In between seasons on air, Handley and his colleagues took ITMA on tour in live shows round the country.

The last edition of ITMA – the 310th – was recorded on 5 January 1949; four days later Handley died suddenly of a cerebral haemorrhage, aged 57. His death was announced on air by the Director General of the BBC, Sir William Haley, who insisted on making the announcement himself. The King and Queen sent a message of sympathy to Handley's widow. Thousands of people lined the route of Handley's funeral procession from the chapel near his London home to Golders Green Crematorium, and packed memorial services were held in two cathedrals: St Paul's on 27 January and Liverpool three days later.

== Reputation ==
Handley and the ITMA team were widely credited with boosting morale during the war, and were unmissable listening for millions. A member of the Royal Household said that if the war were to end between 8.30 and 9 p.m. on a Thursday night none of the household would dare to tell the King until ITMA had finished. Although Handley was a leading star in Britain, his material in ITMA was so topical and local, and delivered at such speed, that it was incomprehensible to many outside the UK. Nonetheless, it was popular in Australia: a writer in The Age commented that Handley's "roguish Liverpudlian twang could have made a stock-exchange report sound funny". A Canadian newspaper quoted an American who heard the show: "I can't understand a word the guy is saying, but it sure sounds like great radio". It was said that Bob Hope, though British-born, found ITMA "too fast" for him.

Haley said of Handley, "He was not only broadcasting's greatest but also its most natural comedian. … He was a true original [and] there will never be anyone quite like That Man again". In Took's words:

He was so much the keystone and embodiment of the actual performance that ITMA died with him. Undoubtedly the greatest British radio comedian of his generation, Tommy Handley was as unique in radio comedy as Charlie Chaplin was in silent film.

== Filmography ==
- It's That Man Again (1943)
- Time Flies (1944)

== Notes and sources ==
=== Sources ===
- Baily, Leslie (1966) [1956]. The Gilbert and Sullivan Book (second ed.). London: Spring Books. OCLC 3651931.
- Burton, Alan; Steve Chibnall (2013). Historical Dictionary of British Cinema. Lanham: Scarecrow. ISBN 978-0-8108-8026-9.
- Dibbs, Martin (2018). Radio Fun and the BBC Variety Department, 1922–67: Comedy and Popular Music on Air. Palgrave Studies in the History of the Media. London: Springer. ISBN 978-3-319-95609-1.
- Longmate, Norman (2010). How We Lived Then: A History of Everyday Life During the Second World War. London: Random House. ISBN 978-1-4090-4643-1.
- Took, Barry (1998). Laughter in the Air: An Informal History of British Radio Comedy. London: Robson Books. ISBN 978-0-903895-78-1.

== Scripts ==
- Kavanagh, Ted (1974). The ITMA years [: scripts]. London: Woburn Press. ISBN 0-7130-0101-1.
