= Frank Gadsby =

British competitive diver (1881–1958)

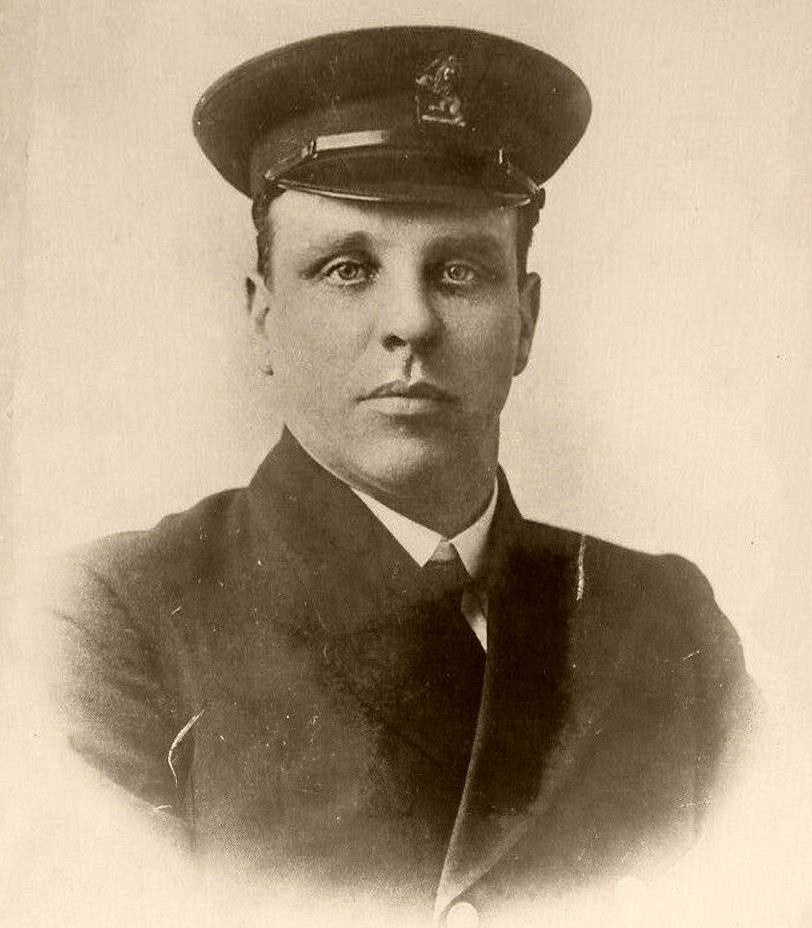
- Gadsby as featured on a British postcard

Personal information
- Full name: Frank Calladine Gadsby
- Born: 19 December 1881 Basford, Nottingham, England
- Died: 7 February 1958 (aged 76) Eastwood, Nottinghamshire, England
- Spouse: Nellie Crossland (m. 1907)

Sport
- Country: Great Britain
- Sport: Diving; swimming

Frank Calladine Gadsby (19 December 1881 – 7 February 1958) was a British competitive diver and swimmer. He was nicknamed "Peggy" on account of having only one leg, after having it amputated following an accident when aged four. He learnt to swim under the instruction of Professor Touhy, who also taught King George V.

Gadsby was a fishmonger and a publican before taking up competitive diving. His exhibition diving started around 1911 and continued into the 1940s. He declared bankruptcy in 1913, with unpaid debts of £300. He performed stunt dives in films, as well as in front of royalty. Despite retiring around 1949, Gadsby continued to perform diving displays, by that time being over the age of 60, on some occasions replacing his son Leslie who was injured. He continued to dive into his 70s, once saying "I can do it still if anyone likes to dare me."

With his wife Nellie Crossland, he had two sons, including Leslie who was also a diver. Gadsby died in February 1958.

== Early life ==
Frank Calladine Gadsby was born on 19 December 1881 to parents James and Charlotte. He was baptised the following month. According to the 1891 United Kingdom Census, he was born in Basford, Nottingham, and was the second of four children, behind an elder sister. At the age of four, one of his legs had to be amputated after an accident following a dislocated hip. Gadsby learned to swim around the age of 12 and was instructed by Professor Touhy, who also gave swimming lessons to King George V. Gadsby would later perform a diving exhibition for King George V.

== Career ==
Prior to becoming a professional diver, Gadsby was a fishmonger and publican, holding the licence for various public houses around Nottingham, including the Albany Hotel and the Black's Head. He would frequently participate in swimming competitions around mainland Europe, as well as being known around British seaside resorts, particularly in Skegness where he dived from Skegness Pier several thousand times.

During the early 1900s, he was a member of the Nottingham Swimming Club's water polo team, and reportedly defeated previously unbeaten world champion swimmer J. A. Jarvis in 1904 during the 440-yard (400 m) King's Cup Race in front of the King and Queen; the Queen sent a lady-in-waiting to Gadsby to enquire how he lost a leg, which he considered a "kindly thought". In 1911, he owed £300 in unpaid debts and had £180 in cash, which he said he would not use to pay his debts as he "did not like to pay one without paying the lot". The official receiver during his cross-examination suggested that Gadsby's circumstances were the result of an extravagant lifestyle. Gadsby declared himself bankrupt in 1913, explaining that his earnings at that time were dependent upon public generosity and weather conditions during his dives, with earnings ranging from £5 to as little as 10 shillings.

Later in September 1913, he swam 13 miles (21 km) from Formby to Southport Pier, which was described by a local newspaper as being "a remarkable swimming performance", covering most of the distance by trudgen stroke with water of a low temperature. Gadsby was accompanied by a dinghy and went a mile off course around a third of the way into his swim due to the tide. He previously swam from Hastings to Eastbourne, which he considered to have been easier due to calmer tides.

In 1920, he was reportedly a swimming instructor on the Cunard Line Imperator, at a time when he was described by The Wichita Beacon as having "achieved a world reputation as a swimmer". In 1924, he was fined 5 shillings by a court in Skegness, having been stopped by a police inspector due to having no light on his bicycle. Gadsby did not attend court, claiming he was engaged in a performance. He was described by The Leicester Mail in 1927 as being "the champion one-legged swimmer and diver of the world". He became the diving and swimming master at Butlin's seaside resorts around 1946.

=== Diving ===
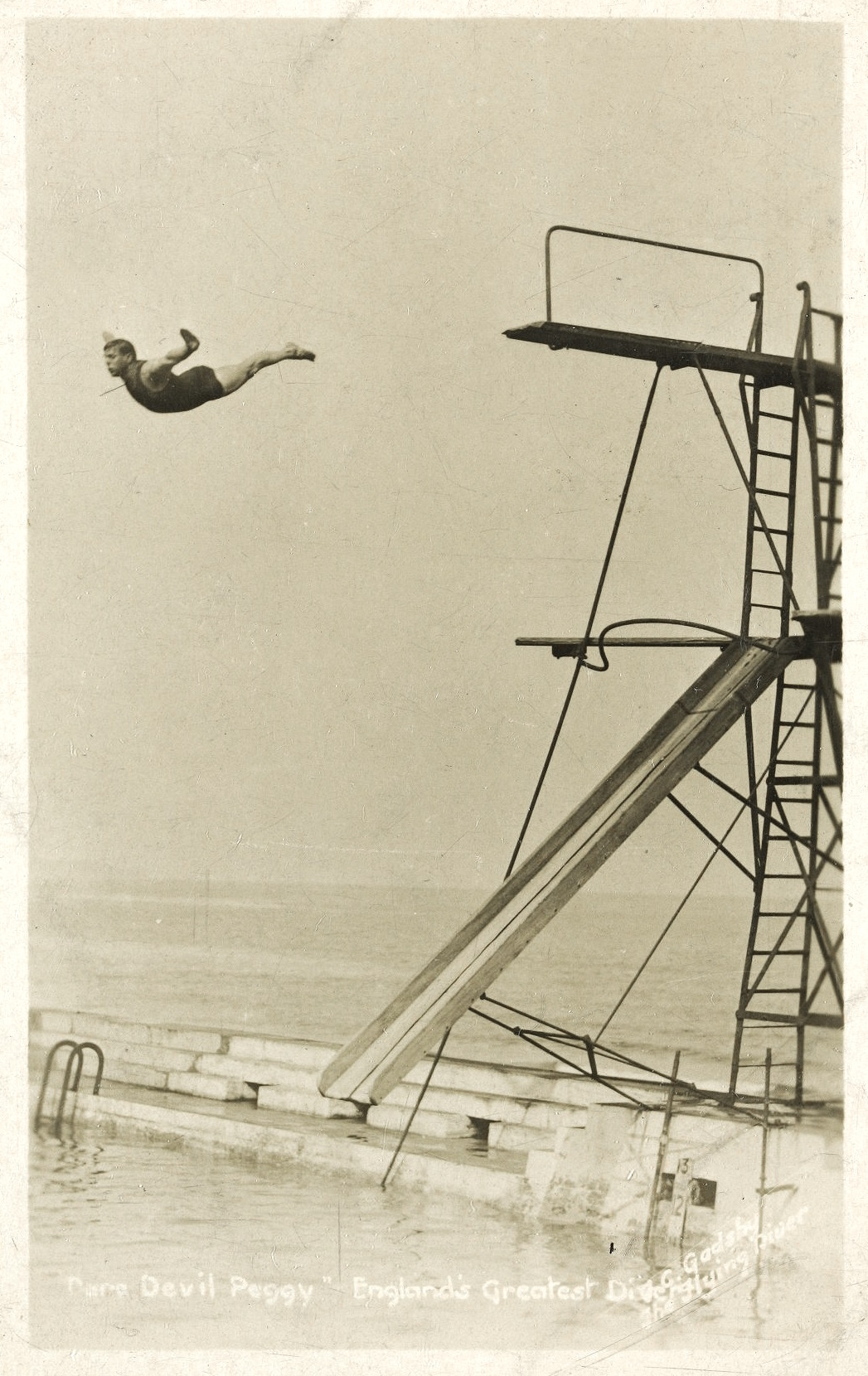
Gadsby diving from a pool diving board, October 1927

Gadsby's diving exhibitions began around 1911. He began diving into fire around the age of 29 and sought to abandon professional swimming due to lack of money and a desire for the "sensationalism" that diving offered. In September 1919, Gadsby made a parachute descent from an aeroplane over the New Brighton and Waterloo shores, drawing large crowds. Originally planning a mid-air dive over the sea, he revised his plan after experts deemed it too risky. Despite only one prior flight experience, Gadsby descended safely into the water and was picked up without incident. The event featured additional attractions, including aerial displays and the arrival of Sopwith planes. In a 1929 interview, he reflected on this dive, describing it as what he believed to be his most sensational feat, particularly as it was only his second time in an aeroplane. After jumping from the plane wearing a lifebelt and a parachute, he dropped for around four seconds before the parachute opened, describing the experience as being "much easier than the usual way of diving".

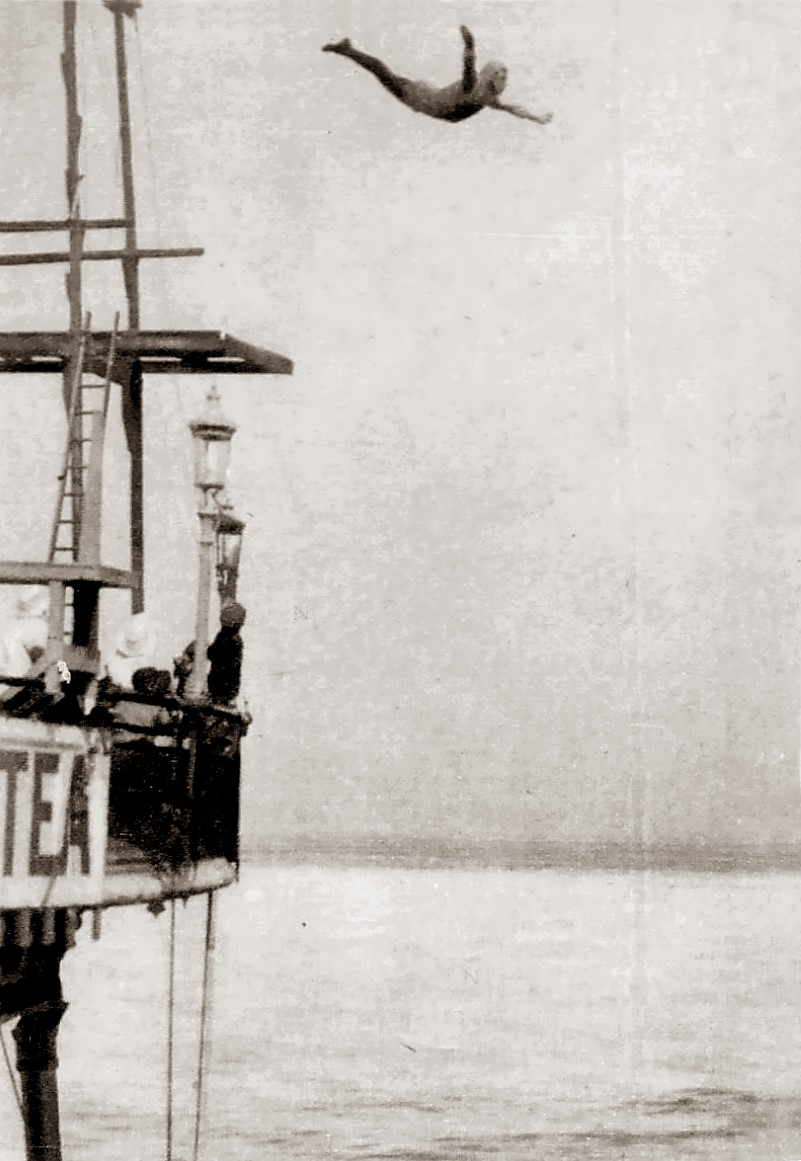
Gadsby jumping from an aeroplane into the River Mersey

As well as public exhibition diving, Gadsby also performed diving in films, working in around 20 by 1929. In 1927, he recalled while working on the 1926 silent film Forbidden Cargoes, he jumped into a net that was suspended over a cliff and it broke, but he managed to hold on and avoided dropping 300 feet (91 m). In October 1927, he dived from a height of 80 feet (24 m) into a tank while on fire. He later did a similar stunt dive in April 1931, diving from a 75 feet (23 m) height into a shallow pool with just 5 feet (1.5 m) of water depth, to a backdrop of fireworks.

During the 1930s, he toured with his group "Dare Devil Peggy's Water Circus", alongside Olympic divers, sometimes booked at considerable expense to the organisers. Gadsby's work as a stunt diver continued throughout the 1930s, such as in September 1938 when he dived with his cloak set alight into a portion of pool water also in flames. In a promotion for a 1948 circus event where he was to dive into a tank of fire, he was described by the Ealing and Acton Gazette as being the "world's greatest high diver".

Gadsby reportedly had a previous close encounter with near death or injury, when he dived from the bridge of the RMS Berengaria and barely cleared a 24 feet (7.3 m) barge. During his career, he performed in front of royalty and once entertained a crowd of over 90,000 at the Wembley Arena.

=== Retirement ===
Gadsby retired autumn 1950 yet continued to dive into his 70s, once saying "I can do it still if anyone likes to dare me" and "the hardest part of the act is climbing up all those rungs with one leg. I can come down alright." He came out of retirement in August 1953 to dive in place of his son Leslie, who was injured, at an event at Greville Smyth Park in Bristol. The act involved diving "in flames, through flames and into flames" from a 74 feet (23 m) platform into a 5-foot-6-inch (1.68 m) deep tank. Gadsby's other son Kenneth also participated in the act, but did not dive. When asked how he felt about the dive after several years into retirement, Gadsby reportedly replied "Not a bit of it", noting it was his lifetime work and that he had learnt it to perfection.

He also replaced his injured son in December 1953, performing a high dive at a fair ground in Carlisle. After retirement, he moved from Hyson Green to Eastwood, Nottinghamshire.

== Personal ==
He married Nellie Crossland on 20 June 1907 in Nottingham, England. Together they had two sons, Leslie and Ken.

== Death ==
Gadsby died on 7 February 1958 in Eastwood, Nottinghamshire.

== Popular culture ==
In 2000, a hotel in New Brighton, Merseyside, was renamed "Peggy Gadfly's" for a number of years, in reference to Gadsby who was known to dive off New Brighton Pier.

Gadsby inspired the character The Diver in the BBC radio comedy It's That Man Again.
