= Ted Kavanagh =

British radio writer (1892–1958)

Kavanagh in 1949

Henry Edward Kavanagh (7 March 1892 – 17 September 1958) was a British radio scriptwriter and producer.

== Life and career ==
Ted Kavanagh was born in Auckland, New Zealand, in 1892. He initially studied medicine in Edinburgh before pursuing a career as a writer. He is best remembered as the writer of It's That Man Again (ITMA), a radio comedy series which ran for a decade from 1939 and was immensely successful. ITMA was devised by Kavanagh, producer Francis Worsley and the Liverpudian comedian Tommy Handley as Handley's specific vehicle; Kavanagh had been writing for him since 1924, and co-wrote two feature films for Handley, It's That Man Again (1943) and science fiction/ comedy Time Flies (1944).

Kavanagh's biography of Handley was published in 1949, the year of the comedian's death and the end of their radio show. A prolific writer, ITMA and his work for Handley constituted only a small proportion of his total oeuvre.

In 1948, Kavanagh set up an agency for writers, Ted Kavanagh Associated (Entertainments) Ltd. The company was dissolved in 1963.

He is credited as bringing solo comedy writers Frank Muir and Denis Norden together, resulting in a successful 30-year partnership that produced Take It From Here and other series. Both writers worked for his agency.

Kavanagh was invited to appear as a guest on Desert Island Discs in 1951, where he selected discs from Tommy Handley, Florence Foster Jenkins and Tod Slaughter.

Ted Kavanagh married Agnes O'Keefe at St Alphonsus' Chapel, Glasgow on 31 March 1919. He died in London on 17 September 1958, aged 66. His son was the poet P. J. Kavanagh who described childhood among the ITMA characters in his autobiographical The Perfect Stranger (1966).

== Radio ==
Selected radio series.

- Stanelli's Bachelor Party (1936) – written by Stanelli with the addition of "ideas by Ted Kavanagh". "A Colossal Conglomeration of Capable Comedians Calculated to Convulse the Community."
- Follow The Band (1939) – "A Variety entertainment for the Army of today and yesterday," written by Ted Kavanagh with Frank O'Brian.
- ITMA (It's That Man Again) (1939–1948) – scripts by Ted Kavanagh.
- Thursday 'Pop' (1940) – "Reported by Ted Kavanagh. Produced by Francis Worsley."
- Coupons, Please! (1940) – written by Ted Kavanagh (possibly with Bill MacLurg).
- Staying Put (1940) – "A holiday at home. The seaside comes to Suburbia." Written by Ted Kavanagh.
- Phoney Island (1940) – written by Ted Kavanagh, produced by Francis Worsley, with Dicky Hassett, Arthur Chesney, Frederick Burtwell, Dick Francis, Dudley Rolph, Vera Lynn.
- Send For Doctor Dick (1940) – A weekly series devised by Ted Kavanagh and Michael North with Dick Francis and Sonnie Hale. Script by Ted Kavanagh.
- Let 'Em All Come! (1940) – written by Ted Kavanagh and Bill MacLurg.
- Ack-Ack, Beer-Beer (circa 1940–1942) – A twice-weekly programme for Anti-Aircraft and Balloon Barrage personnel broadcast on the Forces Network, featuring "the adventures of Rough and Ready (two willing lads) concocted by Ted Kavanagh and Bill MacLurg."
- Dandy Lion (1940–1941) – Described as "a cartoon" and "invented by John Watt", written by C. Denier Warren and Ted Kavanagh, first broadcast on 28 October 1940 (after being postponed due to an important speech by the Prime Minister)
- So What? (1941) – "An inconsequent revue" written by Ted Kavanagh.
- How The Old Place Has Changed! (1941) – "... or where the soldiers fare well by Ted Kavanagh".
- Dial Doris! (1941) – Written by Ted Kavanagh.
- Everyman Jack (1941) – with Jack Train. Written by Ted Kavanagh.
- Irish Half-Hour with Jimmy O'Dea (1942) – Script by Harry O'Donovan and Ted Kavanagh.
- £250 Red Cross Radio Contest (1943) – "Tommy Handley presents his monthly problem, this time with Ted Kavanagh."
- Meet me Victoria (1944) – "Excerpt from the new musical play, written by Lupino Lane and Lauri Wylie from a story by H. F. Maltby, with additional dialogue by Ted Kavanagh."
- Cinderella (1945) – a pantomime; Book, lyrics, and incidental music by the producer, Ernest Longstaffe, with special scenes by Ted Kavanagh, and songs by various composers.
- The Private Life of Mrs Mopp (1946) – "A new series of interludes in the life of radio's most famous charwoman. With Dorothy Summers as Mrs. Mopp Script by Ted Kavanagh. Produced by Jacques Brown."
- Lucky In Love (1946) – Musical Theatre of The Air episode. "An original musical farce by Ted Kavanagh, with lyrics by Terry Stanford and music by Jack Strachey."
- Radio Crossword (1947) – "Programme compiled by H. C. G. Stevens, with listeners piloted by Ted Kavanagh."
- Talk Yourself Out of This (1949) – game show; panellist.
- Now's Your Chance (1949) – radio panel show; "the little man, the consumer, gets his chance to question men of power and responsibility about what's right or wrong". Chairman/ host Ted Kavanagh.
- The Great Gilhooly (1950) – with Noel Purcell, Jack Train and Barbara Mullen, by Ted Kavanagh with Joe Linmane.
- Dear Me (1951) – With Michael Howard. Script by Ted Kavanagh.
- Tommy Handley (1952) – The story of Tommy Handley told by a circle of his intimate friends, and illustrated by recorded extracts from his shows. Written by Ted Kavanagh.
- Melody Milestones (1953) – A musical miscellany of the songs that were hits from 1940 to 1943. Script and research Ted Kavanagh.
- Hi Neighbours (1953) – Starring Jack Jackson. Scripts by Ted Kavanagh.
- At Last! The true story of Humphrey Chinstrap (Col. Retd.) (1954) – Script by Ted Kavanagh. NB. some episodes feature additional dialogue by David Croft.
- My Word (1957) – panellist.

== Television ==
Selected TV work.

- Pinwright's Progress (1946–1947) – written by Rodney Hobson; script editor was Ted Kavanagh. The world's first regular half-hour televised sitcom.
- Such Is Life (1950) – Co-writer.
- Out of This World: The Adventures of Sir Percy Howsey (1950) – script by Ted Kavanagh and Carey Edwards.
- What's My Line? (1951) – panellist on quiz show.
- It's A Small World (1952) – Series. "A strip cartoon by Ted Kavanagh with puppets designed and animated by Sam Williams."
- Top Town (1954–1956) – "A friendly battle of entertainment". Regular guest judge.

== Filmography ==
- It's That Man Again (1943) – screenplay with Howard Irving Young
- Time Flies (1944) – screenplay with Howard Irving Young and JOC Orton
- George in Civvy Street (1946) – George Formby feature. Written by Howard Irving Young, Peter Fraser, Ted Kavanagh, Max Kester and Gale Pedrick.
- Old Mother Riley Headmistress (1950) – screenplay with John Harlow, from an original story by Jackie Marks and Con West

== Publications ==
- Tommy Handley in Holidayland (London, 1946)
- Tommy Handley (London, 1949)
- Colonel Chinstrap (Evans Bros, 1952)
- Why Die of Heart Disease? (George G Harrap & Co Ltd, 1953) – illustrated by CW Keeping
