= Francis Worsley =

English radio producer and cricketer (1902–1949)

Francis Frederick Worsley (2 June 1902 – 15 September 1949) was a radio producer for the BBC who was known for producing the radio comedy series It's That Man Again (ITMA) from 1939 to 1949. As a young man, he was briefly a first-class cricketer.

== Life and career ==
Worsley was educated at Brighton College and Balliol College, Oxford. He was a talented cricketer as a schoolboy and during summer holidays he played for Cardiff Cricket Club, as a result of which he was selected by Glamorgan twice in the 1922 and 1923 seasons. On coming down from Oxford he entered the Colonial Education Service and worked in the Gold Coast, but within two years his health obliged him to resign.

In 1928, Worsley joined the BBC as an assistant in its talks department at Cardiff, and later worked in the corporation's outside broadcasts department and as programme director of the West Region, before joining the variety department in 1938. With the comedian Tommy Handley and the scriptwriter Ted Kavanagh, Worsley devised the radio programme It's That Man Again (ITMA), which ran from 1939 until the sudden death of its star, Handley, in January 1949. Worsley was then appointed to take charge of staff training within the BBC.

Worsley died in hospital in London on 15 September 1949. He was survived by a widow and a son.

== Sources ==
- Haigh, G. (ed.) (2006) Peter the Lord's Cat, Aurum Press: London. ISBN 1-84513-163-0.
