= Scrapbook for 19.. =

Occasional programme on the BBC Home Service

Scrapbook for 19.. was an occasional programme on the BBC Home Service, devised by Leslie Baily and narrated by Freddie Grisewood. Each programme was devoted to one calendar year. It ran chronologically through the year, beginning at midnight on January 1 and ending at midnight on December 31.

Besides the narration, there would be accounts, live where possible, by people who were close to any historical events, recordings of radio broadcasts and newsreels, recordings from popular shows, singers and musicians, all related to the key events and happenings of the year.

This programme was popular because it reminded people of past events and sounds in their lives.

An example was Scrapbook for 1940. This included quotes from: Sir Winston Churchill, Earl Attlee, The Earl Of Avon, Neville Chamberlain, Lord Haw-Haw, J.B. Priestley, Constant Lambert, Herbert Morrison, Ed Murrow, Arthur Askey, Margaret Eaves, George Formby, Vera Lynn, Jack Warner and BBC war reporters & Announcers.
