= Leslie Baily =

Leslie Baily (14 December 1906 – 21 February 1976) was an English journalist, and a writer and producer for BBC Radio from 1924 to 1946. He was known for his books about Gilbert and Sullivan and his BBC Radio Scrapbook programmes.

== Life and career ==
Baily was born in St Albans, Hertfordshire, and educated at the Friends' School, Sibford, near Banbury, and Cheltenham Grammar School. He joined the staff of The Yorkshire Evening News at Leeds, where he became the paper's wireless correspondent. From there, he joined the BBC, and was responsible for a succession of features, plays, adaptations and revues first in the Leeds and Manchester studios of the BBC and then in London.

Baily's Scrapbook series began as a BBC North Regional broadcast in 1932. He later described it as "merely a selection of rather unusual items of music, drama and curious information, presented in rapid panorama. There was no theme or period". From the fourth Scrapbook, in March 1933, the programme was broadcast nationally. In December 1933 the Scrapbook concentrated on a single year – 1913 – with sound clips relating to "the world at work and play; the Volturno disaster; "Everybody's Doing It"; the Beecham Opera Season; "Pelissier Follies"; the Suffragettes; the Tango craze; Hindle Wakes; George Formby; Vesta Tilley; H. H. Asquith; Marie Lloyd; Ragtime; Pavlova, etc." Scrapbooks for other years followed in quick succession. From 1936 Baily and his co-producer Charles Brewer broadcast Star-Gazing, which alternated with the Scrapbooks; in each of these programmes, dubbed "radiobiographies", a popular stage or screen star reminisced about his or her career. Among the one-off programmes devised and presented by Baily was a "Farewell to Daly's", to mark the closure of Daly's Theatre. A series on famous music halls began in 1938.

During the Second World War Baily gave the Scrapbook series a new look as Everybody's Scrapbook, designed to provide a link with the Empire; the formula pleased Canada and Australia as much as Britain. Another long-running series was Travellers' Tales, "Adventures and misadventures, songs and stories from lands overseas, told by world-wide travellers". After the war the Scrapbook series continued, and in 1947 "Gilbert and Sullivan" was first broadcast. It was billed as "a radio biography in six parts", and featured Carleton Hobbs as narrator, with D. A. Clarke-Smith as W. S. Gilbert and Ivan Samson as Arthur Sullivan; the music was performed by singers including Gwen Catley, Sylvia Cecil, Mary Jarred, Winifred Lawson, Charles Heslop and Richard Lewis, conducted by Stanford Robinson. In preparing the script Baily had many conversations with people who had known Gilbert and Sullivan, including Nancy McIntosh, Rupert D'Oyly Carte, and Newman Flower. The series was remade in 1949, with Charles Groves succeeding Robinson as conductor. The last Scrapbook researched by Baily – for the year 1917 – was broadcast in August 1973.

Baily wrote or compiled many books. Some were printed versions of his BBC programmes: Travellers' Tales and the Scrapbooks. The Gilbert and Sullivan Book, first published in 1952, drew from and elaborated on his BBC series. Baily and his collaborators drew on the book for the script of the 1953 film The Story of Gilbert and Sullivan. A reviewer later wrote, "Baily didn't hesitate to fictionalize parts of his book in order to make for a better story, and he doesn't hesitate in the film either. However, the film brilliantly conveys the spirit of what the G&S partnership was about."

Baily died aged 69 at his home in York.
