= New Brighton Pier, Wallasey =

Former pier in New Brighton, northern England

Coordinates: 53.43955°N 3.03652°W

New Brighton Pier
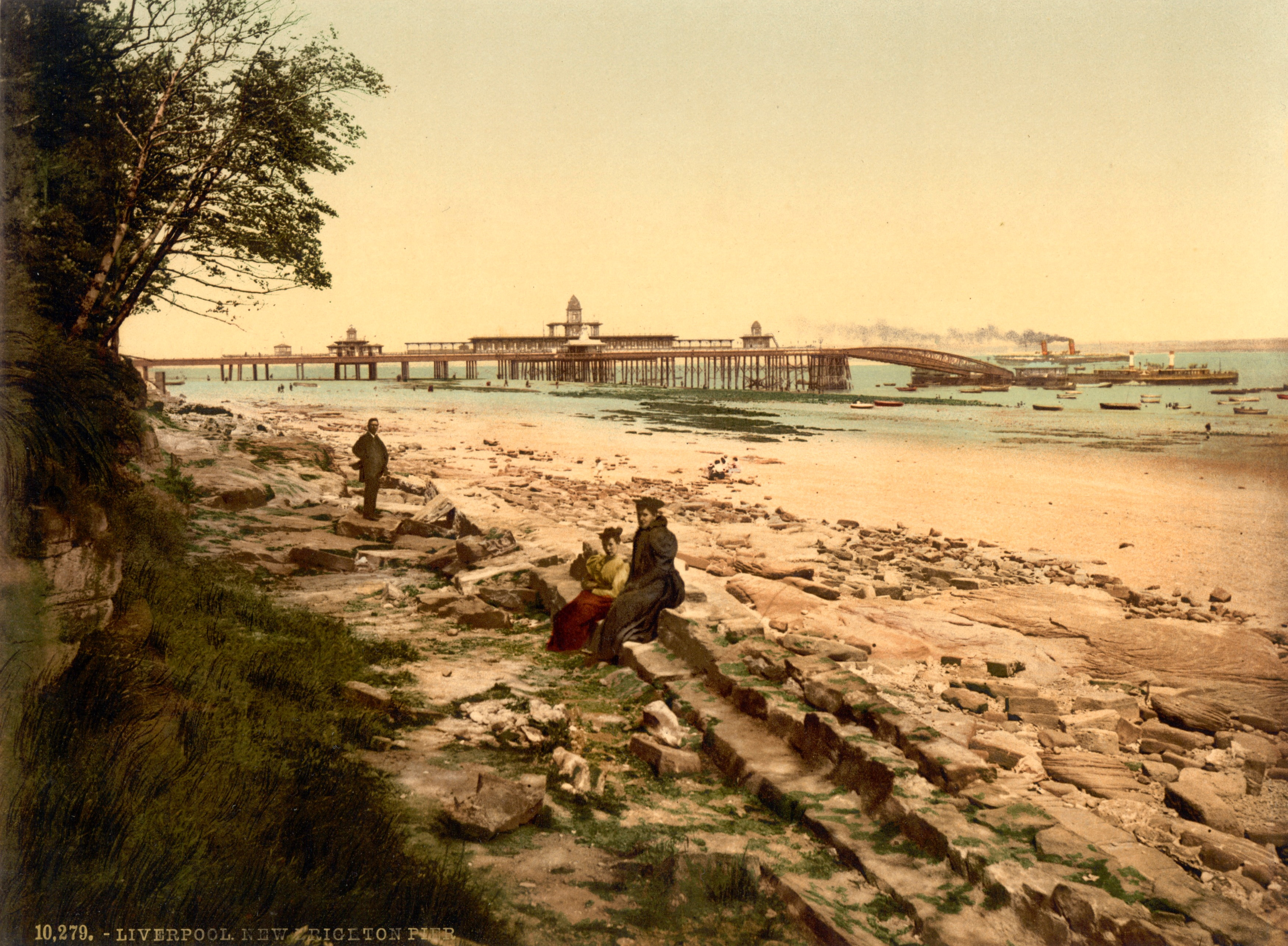
- New Brighton Pier, c. 1890–1900
- Type: Pleasure, fishing
- Location: Wallasey, Cheshire, England

Characteristics
- Construction: Joseph Dowson
- Total length: 600 feet (180 m)

History
- Designer: Eugenius Birch
- Opening date: 1867; 159 years ago
- Closure date: 1977; 49 years ago

New Brighton Pier was a pleasure and fishing pier in New Brighton, Wallasey (then part of Cheshire) in England. It was built during the late 1860s at a length of 600 feet (180 m). During the 19th century, New Brighton had developed into a popular seaside resort for working class visitors from Liverpool.

James Atherton, a merchant and property developer, along with his son-in-law William Rowson, spearheaded the area's development and invited investors to fund a hotel and ferry link to Liverpool, resulting in a wooden landing pier opening in 1834. The Wallasey Improvement Act 1864 (27 & 28 Vict. c. cxvii) authorized the construction of an upgraded iron ferry pier designed by James Brunlees, featuring a floating landing stage. An adjacent promenade pier designed by Eugenius Birch was also later built.

Throughout the early 20th century, the pier underwent various improvements and additions, including a pavilion in 1892 and extensions to the promenade pier in 1900. However, by the 1920s, maintenance costs became unsustainable, leading to the pier's closure in 1923. Wallasey Corporation purchased the pier in 1928 and replaced all structures, including the pavilion, eventually reopening in 1930 and with further improvements in 1935. During World War II, the pier helped protect the River Mersey and prevent passage into Liverpool.

By 1965, the pier faced severe financial losses and structural issues, leading to its closure by the council. It briefly reopened in June 1968 but despite improvements, permanently closed in November 1972. Ferry services to New Brighton had already ceased in 1971. By 1975, engineers declared the pier dangerous due to severe corrosion. Despite efforts by the 'Save New Brighton Pier' committee and local advocacy groups, permission was granted for demolition which was completed by July 1978.

== History ==
During the 19th century, New Brighton emerged as a popular seaside resort Liverpool's working class visitors and was renowned for having the tallest building in England at that time, the 621 feet (189 m) high New Brighton Tower. The area's development was spearheaded by James Atherton, a merchant and property developer, who saw great potential in New Brighton. Together with his son-in-law William Rowson, Atherton developed the area with villas and road networks to assist in transporting building materials.

=== Wooden pier ===
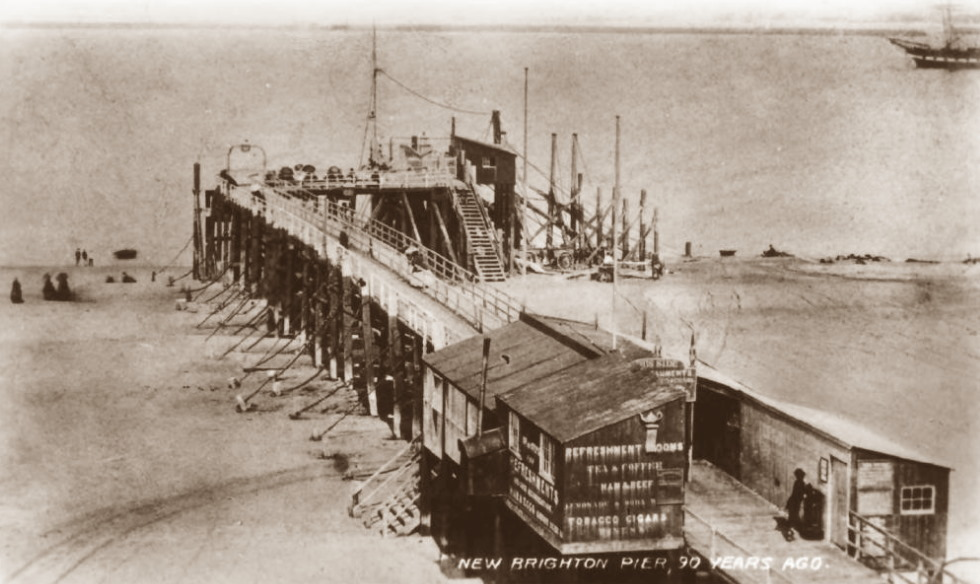
First New Brighton Ferry Pier, c. 1860

In October 1832, Atherton and Rowson invited investors to purchase £100 shares to finance construction of a hotel and establish a ferry link to Liverpool. . By March 1834, a crude wooden landing pier, 135 feet (41 m) in length, was opened alongside the hotel. The landing stage could not be used during low tide, with passengers either having to wade through the water or be transported in small boats. The vessel Sir John Moore ran an hourly service to Liverpool, taking around 25 minutes in good weather. After James Atherton died in 1838, his sons continued to run the ferry service until 1845, when it was taken over by Messrs Lodge Pritchard & Company.

The pier entrance featured a refreshment room, and additional improvements costing around £3,000 (equivalent to £417,000 in 2024) included the introduction of new steamboats, the Queen of Beauty and James Atherton. In 1848, plans to extend the pier failed to materialise, and a gale subsequently damaged the shore end. When the Egremont ferry service was taken over by the Coulborns in May 1848, the New Brighton service was suspended during the winter of 1849–50 as a cost saving measure, though later reopened.

Out of the three ferry services operating around Wallasey, including those at Seacombe and Egremont, the New Brighton service was the most profitable, with receipts in 1859 totalling £9,042 (equivalent to £1,256,800 in 2024). Despite this profitability, landing problems at low tide remained an issue, and the old landing stage was unreliable.

=== Planning ===
The Wallasey Improvement Act 1864 provided the authority to construct a new ferry pier. The council chose a design by James Brunlees for an iron pier, although Brunlees was not appointed as the engineer-in-charge. The new pier was designed to include a floating landing stage and was located slightly northeast of the original pier, allowing the old pier to continue operating during the new pier's construction.

New Brighton Pier Act 1864
- Act of Parliament
- Parliament of the United Kingdom
- Long title: An Act for constructing a Pier at New Brighton in the County of Chester.
- Citation: 27 & 28 Vict. c. cclxvii

Dates
- Royal assent: 25 July 1864

Other legislation
- Repealed by: Wallasey Corporation Act 1967

Status: Repealed

Text of statute as originally enacted

On 25 July 1864, the New Brighton Promenade Pier Company was established with £30,000 (equivalent to £3,706,700 in 2024) in capital to construct a promenade pier adjacent to the existing ferry pier. A design by Eugenius Birch, a well-known pier designer at the time, was chosen. Birch's design was unusual in that it could only be accessed via the ferry pier and not directly from the shore. The New Brighton Pier Act 1864 (27 & 28 Vict. c. cclxvii) allowed three years for the construction work to be completed and required that nuisances be prevented and that light "be exhibited on the pier".

=== Construction ===
Joseph Dowson, who had assisted Birch in the construction of Aberystwyth Pier, was contracted to build the promenade pier. The first of 120 columns was fixed in place on 19 December 1866 and construction progressed without many problems. The design was similar to the nearby New Ferry Pier and consisted of an enlarged platform at the pier's river end, measuring 33.5 by 16 feet (10.2 m × 4.9 m) with a 160 feet (49 m) long bridge connecting the pier and landing stage.

=== Operation ===
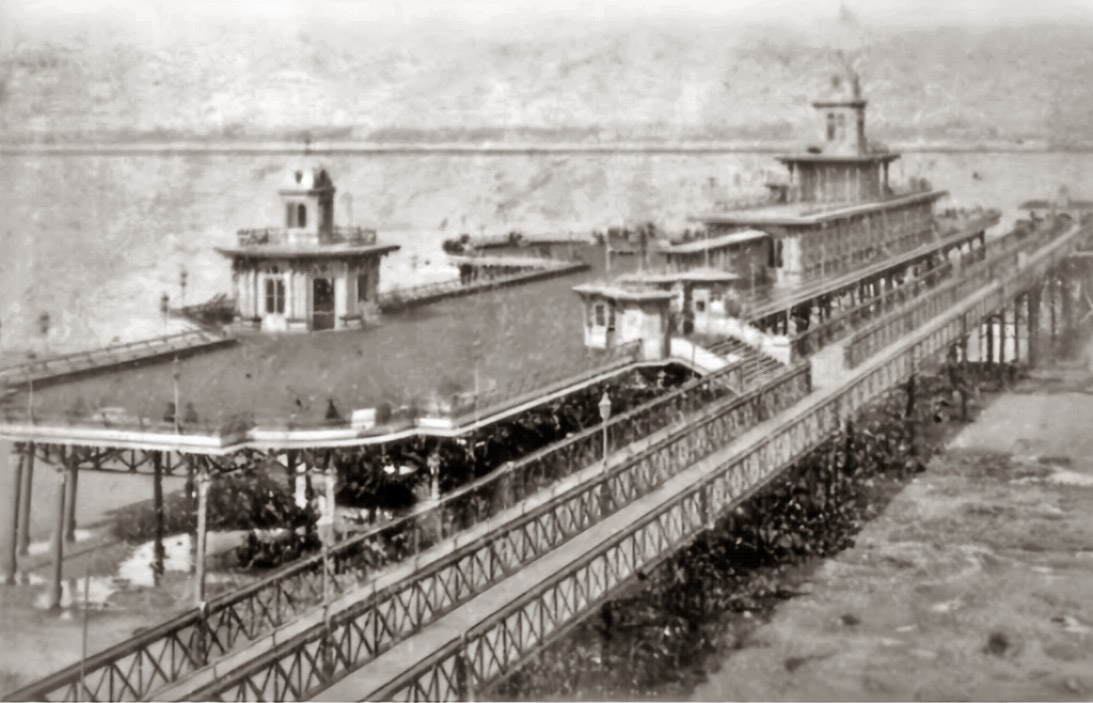
New Brighton's ferry and promenade piers pictured around 1870

The new pier opened on 20 May 1866, eventually costing £23,906 (equivalent to £2,953,700 in 2024), much greater than the initial £9,250 (equivalent to £1,142,900 in 2024) estimate. The new 200 feet (61 m) long landing stage, which height-adjusted with the tide, was connected to the pier via a 160 feet (49 m) iron bridge. The pier officially opened to the public on 7 September 1867, although full completion only occurred on 9 April 1868, when the pier was officially handed over. The total construction cost was £27,000 (equivalent to £3,336,000 in 2024). Admission was 2d, plus 1d to access the upper deck.

On 3 October 1867, the bridge and landing stage were destroyed by the steamer Galileo during a gale, sending the landing stage into the river, though it was later recovered. Repairs costing £3,850 (equivalent to £475,700 in 2024) were completed by 28 May 1868, with further anchoring work extending into 1869. Famous divers such as Tommy Burns, Frank Gadsby and Ted Heaton were known to dive off the pier. Various schemes to extend the pier never materialised, requiring frequent dredging to maintain ferry access. Eventually in August 1881, £22,000 (equivalent to £3,058,000 in 2024) was borrowed to enlarge the pier and landing stage.

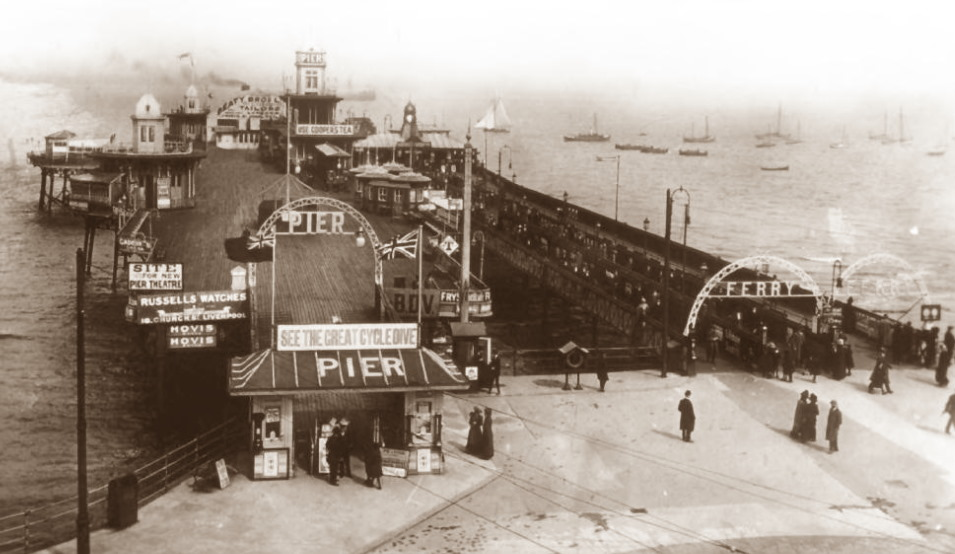
New Brighton Ferry Pier, c. 1914

In 1892, a 130 feet (40 m) long pavilion was added for concerts and balls, among other events. Passenger numbers for the year ending 31 March 1898 were over 2.7 million, an increase of over 300,000 from the preceding year. The promenade pier was extended to 660 feet (200 m) in 1900 to reach the newly built promenade and pier entrance. In 1909–1910, the pavilion was refurbished, including new decor and a heating system. On 16 March 1907, part of the landing stage collapsed, sending the pontoon down the river for some distance. The southern bridge also sustained significant damage and was replaced on 29 August 1907.

=== After World War I ===
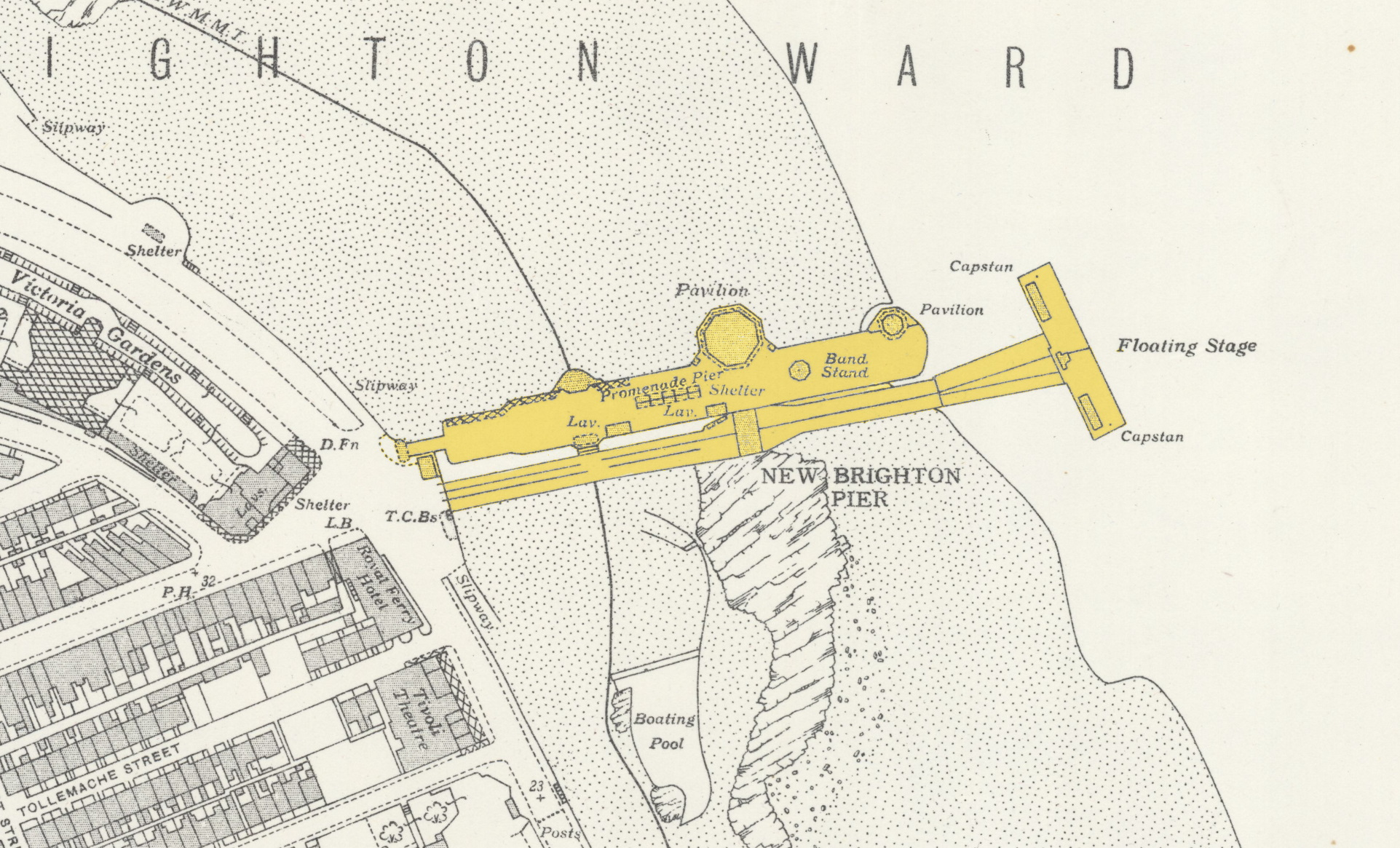
Ordnance Survey map showing location of former New Brighton Pier, c. 1937

By the 1920s, the pier required maintenance which was unaffordable to the pier company. The pavilion closed in 1923 and the Board of Trade declared the pier as unsafe. In 1928, the pier was purchased for £13,000 (equivalent to £963,700 in 2024) by Wallasey Corporation, who initially expected renovation works to cost an additional £15,000. Renovation was favoured over a full rebuild, estimated around £80,000 (equivalent to £5,930,700 in 2024), although later reports suggested the true cost to renovate was underestimated, due to requiring replacement of all structures and the entire deck.

The pier was reopened in April 1930 by the Major of Wallasey, with a reported reconstruction cost of around £50,000 (equivalent to £3,706,700 in 2024). The pavilion was replaced with a bandstand and clubhouse, while the Wallasey Yacht Club also moved its headquarters to the pier. In spring 1935, a scheme to reconstruct the pier was proposed at a cost of £24,000 (equivalent to £1,906,300 in 2024), alongside repainting the structure from dark green to cream. Renovations were made during the winter of 1935–1936, which included a wider deck and a new booking hall.

The pier was used during World War II to protect the River Mersey and passage into Liverpool, with some accounts suggesting the pier was fitted with torpedo tubes. Following the war, a German submarine periscope was installed for visitors who could look through it for a small charge. Plans for a new concert pavilion in 1954 were withdrawn on financial grounds, after a report concluded that the estimated cost of £20,000 (equivalent to £654,100 in 2024) would be inadequate. Instead, Wallasey Council was asked to offer £4,000 to provide covered shelters made from steel framework. In June 1958, 22-year-old Bernard Lloyd died after falling 60 feet (18 m) while dancing and his partner was also seriously injured.

=== Decline and closure ===
In February 1965, reports indicated that the pier might be sold due to needed repairs, with a stipulation that a new buyer maintain it for at least ten years. A survey revealed the pier was generally in reasonable condition but required urgent steel replacements and extensive painting. The council was losing about £4,700 annually from the pier's upkeep, which was host to West Cheshire Sailing Club and New Brighton Angling Club. The pier was closed by the council later in 1965 due to decline which was partly attributed by the loss of the golden sands, caused by a polluted foreshore from Liverpool Docks' expansion. In December 1966, a town meeting to decide its future voted 168 to 87 to remove the pier, with the council claiming that could save £47,000 (equivalent to £1,005,100 in 2024). John Brindle, a club owner, suggested amalgamating the adjacent ferry and promenade pier, which would reduce the cost of saving the pier to £12,500 (equivalent to £267,300 in 2024).

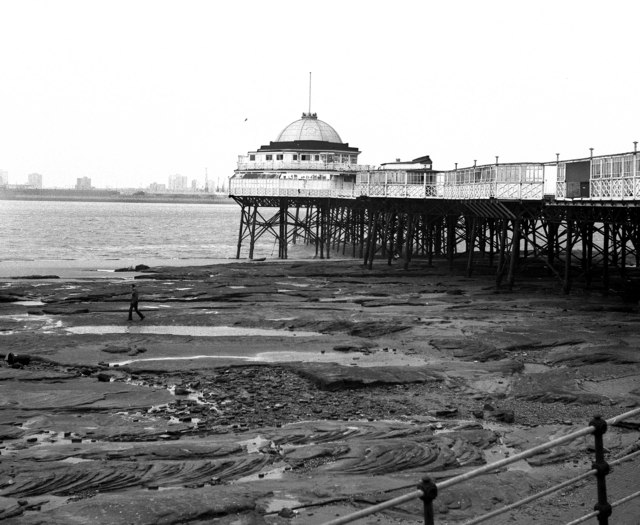
The pier in 1977, shortly before demolition

The pier was later leased to a subsidiary of Fortes, who reopened it in June 1968. Despite around £200,000 (equivalent to £3,971,400 in 2024) of improvements being made, the pier finally closed in November 1972. Mersey Ferries to New Brighton had already ceased in 1971, with the last departing on 26 September 1971. Further proposals to try and save the ferry by removing the sandbank and building two large retaining walls, did not come to fruition and the ferry pier with its landing stage were subsequently dismantled. The pier closed in 1975 on advice from engineers who declared it as dangerous, with some metal being described as "wafer thin" from corrosion.

The 'Save New Brighton Pier' action committee were formed on 19 July 1976, seeking support from The Beatles and The Spinners, who they suggested owe their early careers to the pier. In October 1976, Wallasey MP Lynda Chalker invited residents to support saving the pier for £40,000 (equivalent to £317,700 in 2024) and initiated arrangements for a local inquiry. Chalker spoke at a meeting on 14 January 1977 to rally support for the 'Save the Pier' campaign. The January 1977 inquiry saw strong representation from various local groups, including the New Brighton Pier Action Committee, local hoteliers and the Wallasey Historical Society.

== Demolition ==
By 1977, the promenade pier was operating at a loss and had become unsafe due to lack of appropriate maintenance, with Wirral Borough Council estimating that basic repairs alone would cost £170,000, not including annual maintenance or insurance. Wirral planning authority acknowledged that the pier was "a structure of architectural and historic interest", but did not believe that restoration investment was likely as there would be considerable expense and a need for a "substantial future annual maintenance" commitment. In June, the Secretary of State for the Environment Peter Shore granted permission for the pier's demolition which was by then described as "a pier of undistinguished appearance". In November 1977, maritime approval for the pier's demolition had been received from the Mersey Docks and Harbour Company and it was ultimately demolished starting in February 1978 and completed in July 1978.

== Renewal proposals ==
A regeneration plan was announced in 2002 by Neptune Developments Ltd, which was proposed to include a new 500 feet (150 m) pier on the site of the original pier at a cost of £3.5 million, although this did not come to fruition.
