= Jeanie Deans (disambiguation) =

Jeanie Deans is the heroine of the novel the Heart of Midlothian.

Jeanie Deans may also refer to:

- PS Jeanie Deans, a ship
- Jeanie Deans (railway locomotives)
- Jeanie Deans (opera), an opera by Hamish MacCunn
- Jeanie Deans (play), a play by Dion Boucicault
- "Jeanie Deans" (song)
- "Jeanie Deans" (poem), a poem by Carolina Oliphant (Lady Nairne)
- Jeanie Deans (hybrid rose)
- Jeanie Deans (geriatric unit), a hospital unit in Victoria Infirmary, Helensburgh, Scotland
