= The Little Grey Men =

1942 children's novel by Denys Watkins-Pitchford

- First edition (UK)
- Author: 'BB'
- Illustrator: Denys Watkins-Pitchford (the author)
- Cover artist: Watkins-Pitchford
- Series: The Little Grey Men
- Genre: Children's fantasy novel
- Publisher: Eyre & Spottiswoode
- Publication date: 1942
- Publication place: United Kingdom
- Media type: Print (hardcover)
- Pages: 201 pp (first ed.)
- OCLC: 752520061
- LC Class: PZ8.W3 Li
- Followed by: Down the Bright Stream

The Little Grey Men: A story for the young in heart is a children's fantasy novel written by Denys Watkins-Pitchford under the pen name 'BB' and illustrated by the author under his real name. It was first published by Eyre & Spottiswoode in 1942 and it has been reissued several times. Set in the English countryside, it features the adventures of four gnomes who may be the last of their race. At the same time it features the countryside during three seasons of the year.

Watkins-Pitchford won the 1942 Carnegie Medal recognising The Little Grey Men as the year's best children's book by a British subject.

A sequel was published in 1948, Down the Bright Stream; later issued as The Little Grey Men Go Down the Bright Stream (Methuen, 1977). Jointly they may be called the Little Grey Men series.

The original novel was adapted for television in 1975.

== Plot summary ==
The last four gnomes in Great Britain live beside Folly Brook in Warwickshire; they are named after the flowers Baldmoney, Sneezewort, Dodder and Cloudberry. After Cloudberry goes exploring one day and does not return, the others make the tremendous decision to build a boat, the Dragonfly, and set out to find him. This is the story of the gnomes' epic journey, set against the background of the English countryside, beginning in spring, continuing through summer, and concluding in autumn, when the first frosts are starting to arrive.

== Characters ==
=== The Gnomes ===
- Dodder is the oldest and grumpiest gnome, and the leader of the group. He is a skilled fisherman and has a leg made from bone as the result of an attack by a fox.
- Baldmoney acts as the navigator and mechanic on the gnomes' boat Jeanie Deans, and later invented a glider named Wonderbird.
- Sneezewort is the youngest, most sensitive gnome who follows the lead of his older brothers and is usually assigned the less interesting tasks such as cooking and cleaning.
- Cloudberry is a boastful and rebellious loner who often leaves the group to explore the forest. He is on good terms with the greylag geese of Spitzbergen known as the hounds of heaven.

=== Supporting characters ===
- Squirrel is the gnomes' friend who accompanies them on their adventures in both books.
- Ben is an owl who provides the gnomes with mouse skins for clothing.
- Water Vole is the gnomes' neighbour who appears in both books.
- Bub'm is a rabbit whom the gnomes rescue from a snare in the first book. Also a general term for rabbits.
- Sir Herne is a heron who appears in both books.
- Otter helps pull the Jeanie Deans to safety after her clockwork motor breaks.
- Mr Brockett is a badger who appears in Down the Bright Stream.
- Kack-Jack is a thieving jackdaw who steals some of the farmer's silk handkerchiefs for Baldmoney's glider.
- Woodcock is a friend of the gnomes who has his own island at the heart of an Irish lough.
- Nanny goat lives on a farm and allows the gnomes to milk her.
- The Farmer is Nanny Goat's owner. In Down The Bright Stream, Baldmoney uses his best Sunday shirt to build Wonderbird.
- Mr Shoebottom is an alcoholic petrol station owner who repairs the gnomes' boat after it is discovered by his son.
- Pan, the Greek guardian of nature, is the unseen deity who protects the gnomes and forest animals, as in "The Piper at the Gates of Dawn".
- Robin Clobber is a human seven-year-old boy, a scion of a noble family, who meets the gnomes and whose model ship is found and used by them.

=== Villains ===
- Cruel Giant Grum is a human gamekeeper who kills any animal that enters his wood. The gnomes witness his death in the first book.
- Jet is Giant Grum's black hound who tracks down intruders in Crow Wood.
- White Stoat is a vicious ferret who serves as Giant Grum's henchman, and is rewarded for killing rabbits.
- The "Chinaman" is an arrogant, brightly coloured cock pheasant who acts as Giant Grum's lackey.
- Red Robber is a greedy atheist fox who tries to eat Dodder, and does not believe in Pan.
- The Worm of Death is a treacherous, sadistic adder who preys upon defenceless chicks in the second book.

== Sequels ==
=== Down the Bright Stream ===
In the first sequel (published 1948), the four gnomes are forced to leave their home after it is damaged by flooding. Using their clockwork boat the Jeanie Deans, and later a flying machine named Wonderbird, they travel to Ireland and colonise a ruined chapel surrounded by a loch.

=== The Forest of Boland Light Railway ===
Years earlier, a community of gnomes in the Forest of Boland build a narrow gauge railway to transport their miners to the gold mines and cope with the growing yields of ore. Some wicked goblins steal the steam locomotive named the Boland Belle, overrun the town and enslave the population, but are eventually driven out of the forest by a friendly tribe of Cowzies. The book's popularity among Generation X children in the UK meant that it was reprinted twice, during the early 1970s and mid 1980s.

== Literary significance and reception ==
This novel has been described as the most distinguished fantasy of the war years, a fantasy which sought to capture the beauty and wonder of an English year, a timely and timeless book. Through the choice of gnomes for the protagonists, the author was able to get closer to nature and show more effectively the hazards wild creatures face. The authenticity of the natural history satisfied the preference of the Carnegie committee for realism over fantasy, and the book won the award for the most outstanding children's book of 1942.

The novel was one of Syd Barrett's favourite books; an excerpt from it was read at his funeral. It may have also influenced "The Gnome", a song written by Barrett.

== Television adaptation ==
In 1975 The Little Grey Men was adapted into a 10-part animated series, called Baldmoney, Sneezewort, Dodder and Cloudberry, by Anglia Television in the U.K.

Awards
Preceded by We Couldn't Leave Dinah	Carnegie Medal recipient 1942	Succeeded by The Wind on the Moon
