= Bill Badger =

Bill Badger may refer to:

- Bill Badger, a friend of Rupert Bear
- Bill Badger, a book series by Denys Watkins-Pitchford
- Bill Badger, a defender of the 2011 Tucson shooting
