= Alice Marriott (actress) =

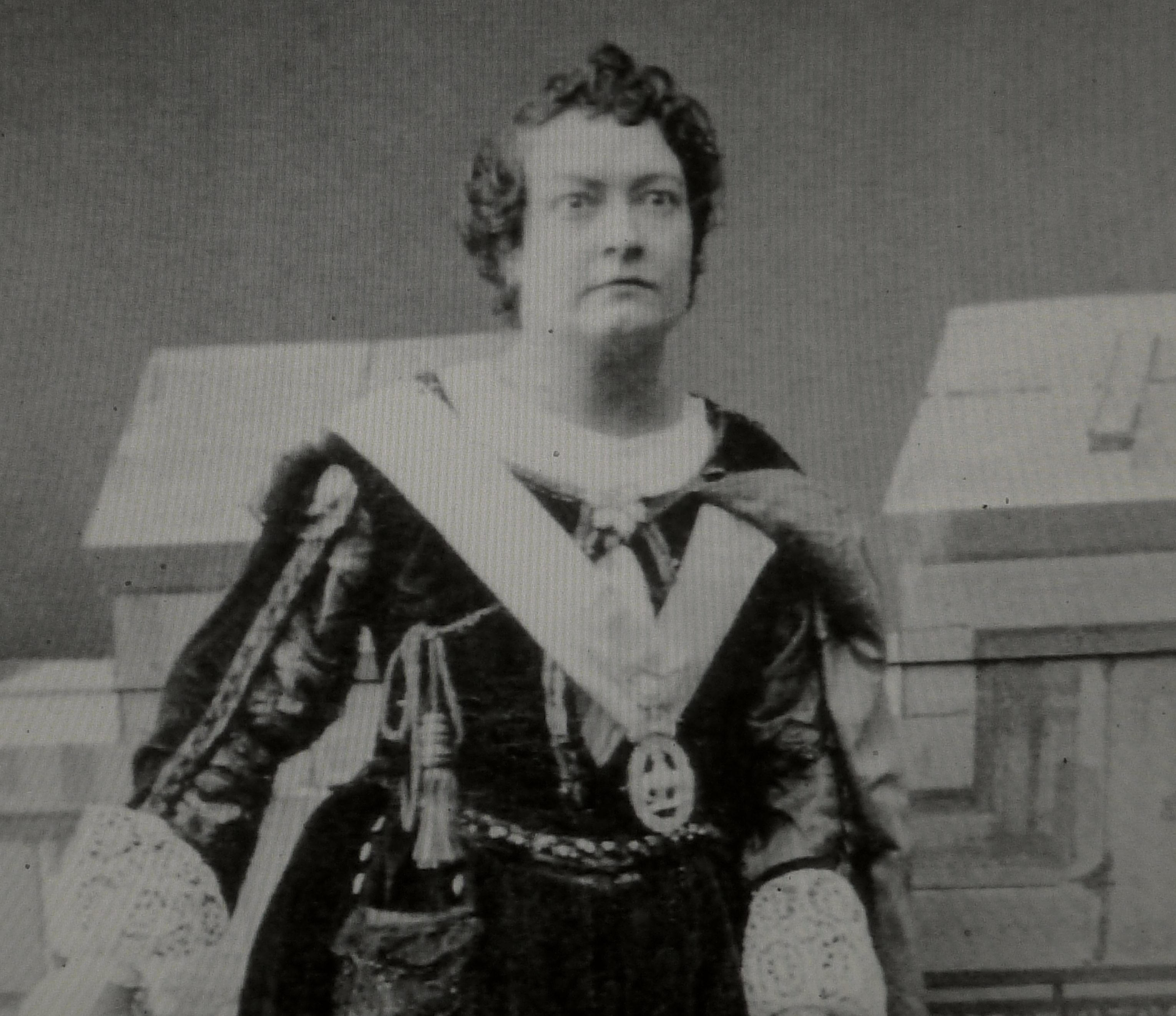
- Alice Marriott as Hamlet at Sadler's Wells (1864)
- Born: 17 December 1824; London, England
- Died: 25 December 1900 (aged 76); Marylebone, London, England
- Other names: Professional names: Mrs Marriott; Miss Marriott. Private name: Alice Edgar
- Occupations: Stage actor and manager
- Years active: 1854–1900
- Known for: Playing Shakespearean male leading roles in doublet and hose
- Notable work: Leading part in: Hamlet, Jeanie Deans, and Vengeance in The Only Way
- Spouse: Robert Edgar
- Relatives: Marriott Edgar, Edgar Wallace

Alice Marriott (17 December 1824 – 25 December 1900), known professionally as Mrs Marriott or Miss Marriott, was a nineteenth-century British stage actress. She was known for regularly playing the part of Hamlet in doublet and hose, to good reviews. She married Robert Edgar, lessee of Sadler's Wells Theatre, and took responsibility for management and production at this and other theatres for some years, besides touring America and Britain. Towards the end of her career she played alongside Sir Henry Irving and Dame Ellen Terry at the Lyceum Theatre, London, but it was Alice Marriott who "made the female Hamlet respectable in England." She was the grandmother of Edgar Wallace and Marriott Edgar.

== Background ==
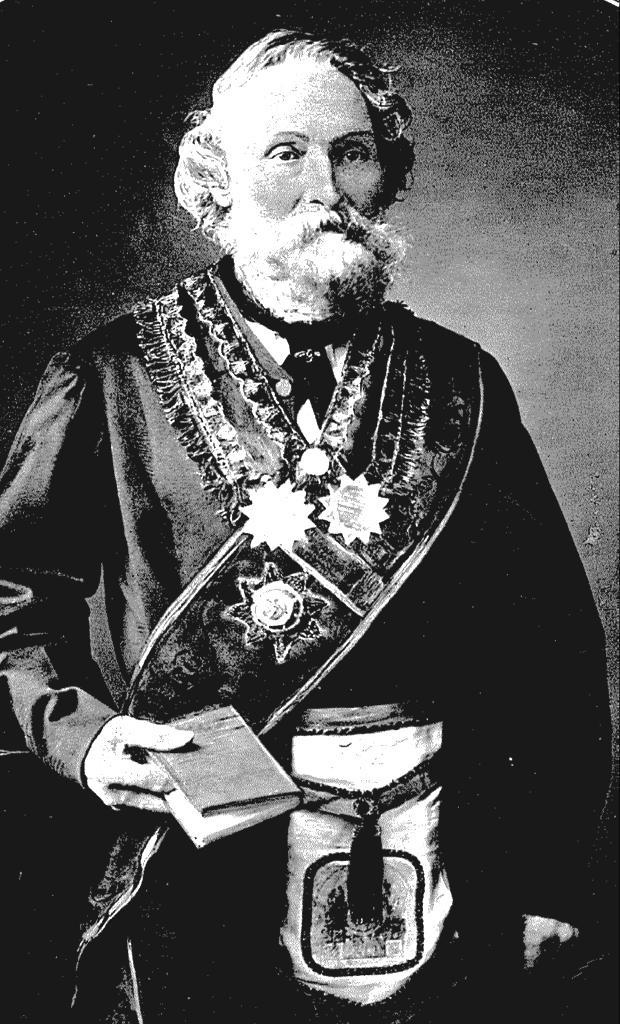
Alice Marriott's father, James Henry Marriott, in costume of founder of Oddfellows Hall, Wellington

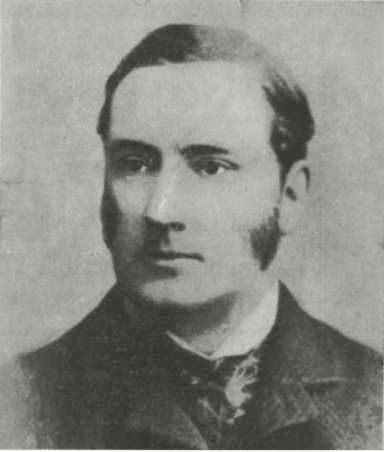
Alice Marriott's son, Richard Horatio Marriott Edgar

Alice Marriott was born on 17 December 1824 in London, and baptised on 13 February 1825 at St Leonard's, Shoreditch, London. Her parents were James Henry Marriott (c. 1800 – 25 August 1886), a London, England-born New Zealand theatre manager, actor, entertainer, dramatist, songwriter, engraver, optician and bookseller and his wife, Sarah.

In 1856, Alice married Robert "Bob" Edgar in the St George's Square area of London. Robert Edgar was the "last lessee of the old Liver Theatre in Church Street, Liverpool, and the first lessee of the Royal Park Theatre, Liverpool." He was living in Wigan at the time.

During the 1860s, after living for ten years in New Zealand, James Henry Marriott returned to visit his daughter Alice while she was co-manager of Sadler's Wells. Robert Edgar died a few years after the visit. Edgar was allegedly a "useless creature whom Alice dignified with the title of manager. In fact she did everything about the theatre, even to counting out the salaries on Saturdays ... She made a great deal of money and would have been wealthy had she not married Robert Edgar, who was convinced that he knew the best way to invest it. He had a mania for buying up shop property at high prices and selling, generally, at a loss." In 1869 the Islington Gazette added further information, that Edgar was summonsed for non-payment of a year's worth of beer money. He pleaded that "business was not now very flourishing," but had to pay.

The 1881 Census finds Alice Edgar in Southport, a widow aged 55 years and an actress. With her are her son Richard H.M. Edgar, a comedian with his wife, three of his children, a housekeeper and a governess. Alice Marriott died suddenly on Christmas night, 1900, at 8 Bryanston Street, Portman Square, London.

=== Descendants ===
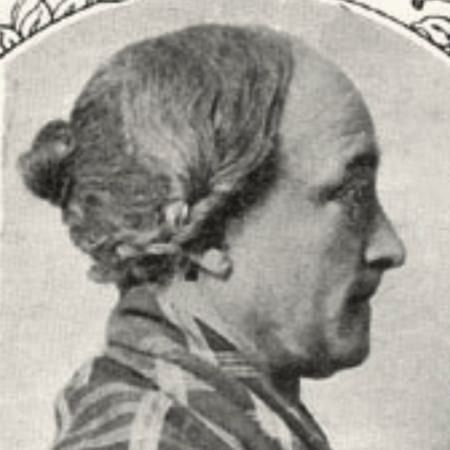
Marriot Edgar, as a pantomime dame

Her three children were all born in Lancashire: Richard Horatio Marriott (1847–1894), Adeline Marriott (b. 1853), and Grace Marriott (b. 1858). All three were products of liaisons before her marriage, and all three took Alice's husband's surname later. Richard was a sometime comic pantomime actor, under the name of Richard Marriott Edgar.

One of her grandsons was the pantomime dame George Marriott Edgar (1880–1951), known professionally as Marriott Edgar. He was born in Scotland, the son of Richard Horatio Marriott Edgar, and he was the dramatic author who wrote the comic monologue, The Lion and Albert for Stanley Holloway. Another grandson was the writer Edgar Wallace (1875–1932), the illegitimate son of Richard Horatio Marriott Edgar.

== Career ==
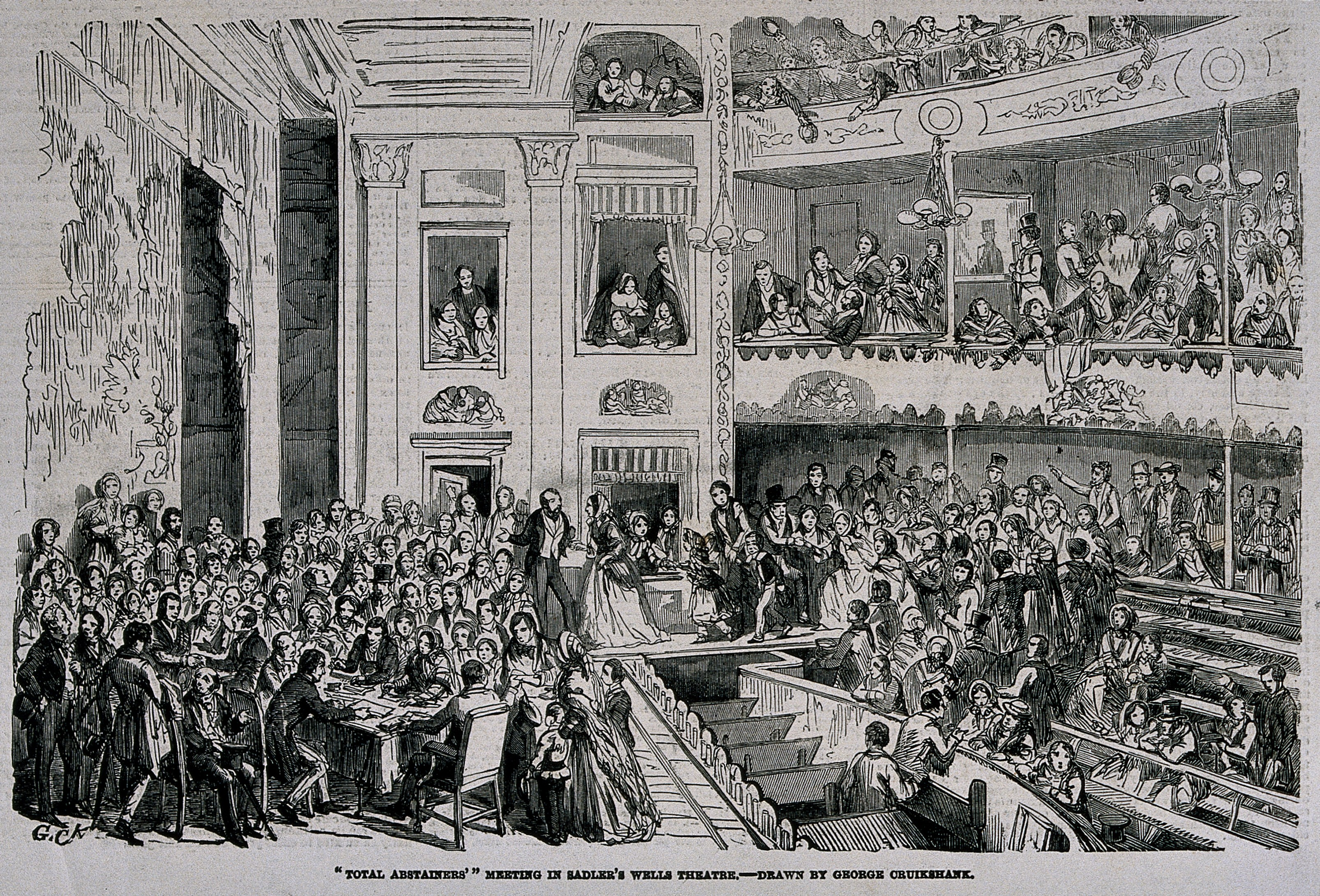
The interior of Sadler's Wells, 1854

Marriott began her career as a dancer, trained by Oscar Byrne. She first performed at the Theatre Royal, Manchester, until asked at short notice to take the part of Biddy Nuts in Wreck Ashore by Buckstone. Subsequently, she played chambermaid roles until she had the opportunity to play tragedy in Liverpool. "Rapidly she rose in public estimation, one success following hard upon the heels of another." She had a "decided triumph" as Bianca in Fazio at Drury Lane, then she performed at the Surrey Theatre, directed at the National Standard theatre, and became acting manager of Sadler's Wells. During her career so far, she was known for playing Hamlet, Meg Merrilies, Helen Macgregor, Gertrude, and Emilia in Othello.

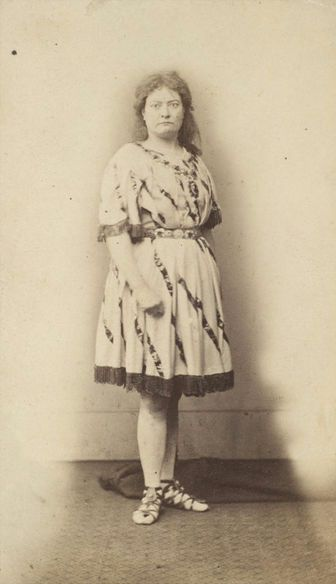
Marriott as Hamlet in the early days

An alternative version of her life states that her stage debut was in December 1854 at the Old Drury. She "served her novitiate" at the Adlephi Theatre, Liverpool, where her husband-to-be, "Bob" Edgar, was acting manager. In December 1858 she performed in Pauline, or Three Murderers of De Burcy, and in Jane Brightwell, or The Beggar's Petition at the Royal Adelphi, Sheffield.

In 1863 Alice Marriott and Robert Edgar took over the management of Sadler's Wells Theatre for six years. Edgar was nominally the manager, but Marriott undertook production, acting and management. For the winter season beginning September 1864, her improvements included providing chairs for the dress circle and allowing women to wear bonnets in the pit-stalls. The first play that season was Love, by Sheridan Knowles. A reviewer said: "The company, ... if not quite equal to the sustainment of so refined a drama, is nevertheless more than respectable." She was "for some years lessee of several theatres, including the Sadler's Wells and the Standard at Shoreditch. She played also in the provinces." The couple gave up the lease of Sadler's Wells at the end of 1869 after their American tour, and in 1870 it was taken over by William Henry Pennington. On 15 January 1870 Marriott appeared at Sadler's Wells (now leased by Mr Pennington) as Julia, in The Hunchback, and she performed in The Lady of Lyons and Fazio there in the same week.

After her return from touring between 1870 and 1881 with Miss Marriott's Dramatic Company," she managed Sadler's Wells again from 1881 for about eight years. At some point before 1890 she joined the Lyceum Company, acting with Henry Irving and Ellen Terry. For example, she performed in Ravenswood there in 1890.

Marriott "made much of her income from melodrama," but also played Shakespearean roles such as Juliet and Lady Macbeth regularly, and later Romeo. She played one of the witches in Henry Irving's 1889 Macbeth at the Lyceum. She was described as the "ultimate tragedienne" for her lead part in Jeanie Deans. She played the Adelphi Theatre, London, in 1895 and 1898.

=== Playing Hamlet ===
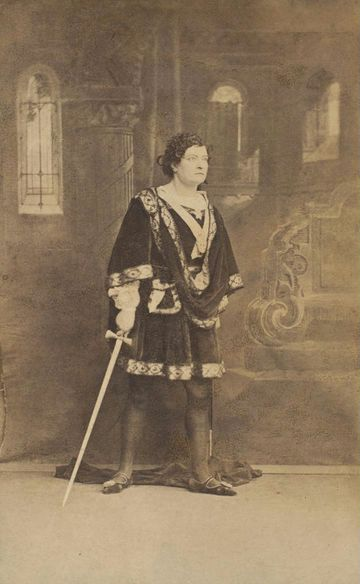
Alice Marriott as Hamlet at Sadler's Wells, 1864

Marriott played Hamlet "thousands of times." On the first occasion, her "leading man disappointed her", she stepped in successfully: an encouraging start. She was not the only woman to play Hamlet. Other Women in Black who played the part in the 19th century were Winetta Montague, Clare Howard, Louise Pomeroy, Charlotte Compton, Millicent Bandmann-Palmer, Julia Seaman and Oliph Webb, to name a few. She is first recorded as playing Hamlet in an 1859 tour of Glasgow, Bath, Birmingham, Dublin and Liverpool, three years after marrying Robert Edgar, and one year after giving birth to Grace Marriott, of whom Edgar was not the father. Following this, she played the same Prince of Denmark at the Theatre Royal, Marylebone, in 1861.

After taking over Sadler's Wells Theatre with her husband Robert Edgar in 1863, she first played Hamlet there on 22 February 1864, the tricentenary of Shakespeare's birth. Samuel Phelps had already begun a tradition there for "scrupulous productions of Shakespeare for working and lower middle-class audiences", and Marriott and Edgar developed this further with an "archaeologically correct production, with new and characteristic scenery, new and appropriate costumes, new and elaborate machinery and correct armour," all directed and superintended by Marriott. The theatre advertised that "medieval documents, weapons and architecture have been copied with exactness ... the result of long and anxious deliberation on the subject, assisted by such evidence as may be deemed authentic." Nevertheless, this was still a play with "Shakespeare's fluidity" and a cross-dressing woman at the heart of it, so at the same time she had to make it work. She played the part four nights a week - 50 nights altogether - to enthusiastic reviews: "It is the Hamlet of Miss Marriott that will attract the Shakespeareans in the Shakespearean year." This success may have been helped - or hindered - by her being "tall, massive and middle-aged at that time."

She was back in Liverpool playing Hamlet by 22 April 1864, where the theatre doors were thrown open and she played for free." In 1887 she played Hamlet at Her Majesty's Theatre, Aberdeen.

=== American tour ===
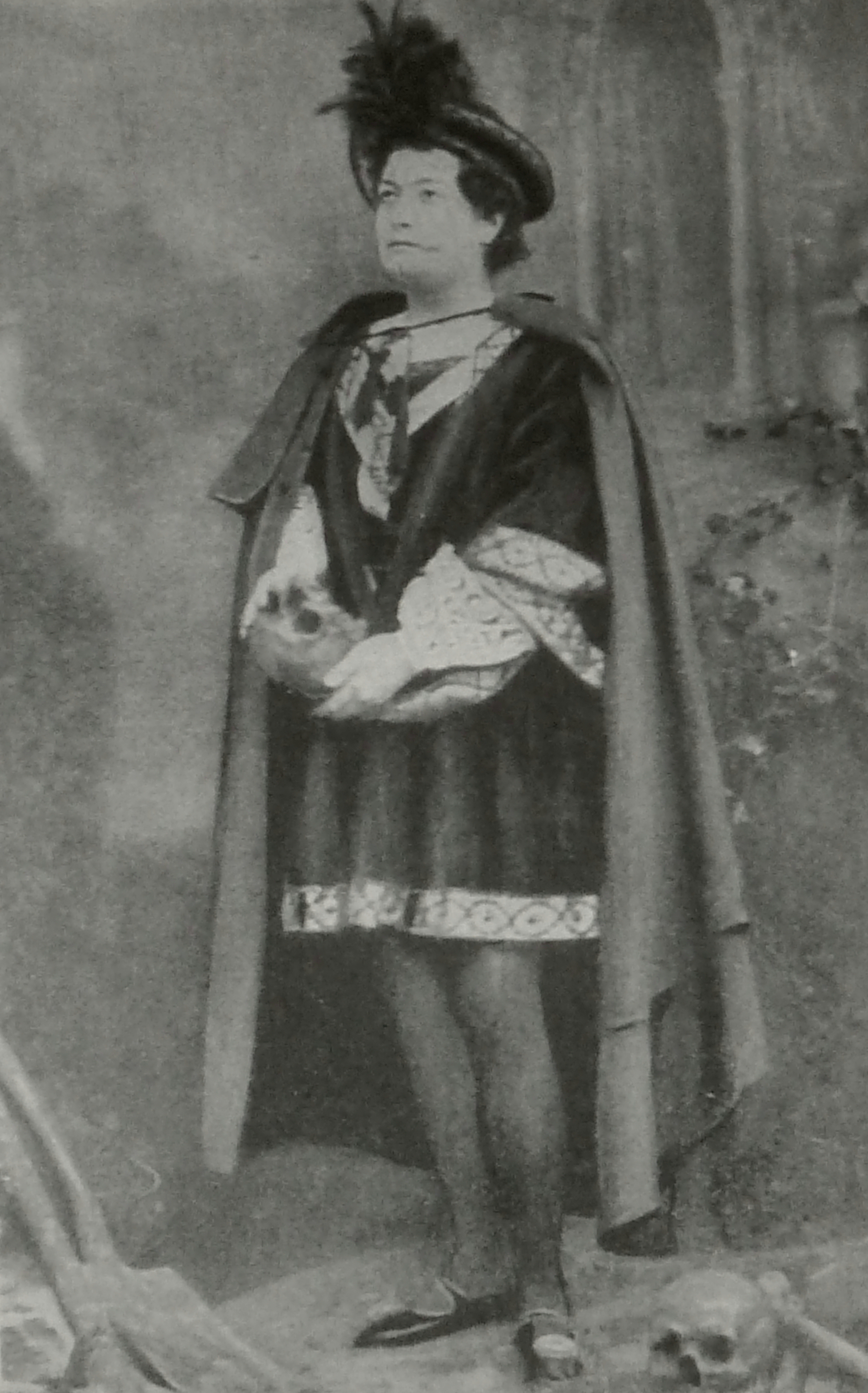
Alice Marriott as Hamlet

After a hesitant start, this trip began well, but ended awkwardly. The tour was to have started in February 1869, but was postponed until 3 March, due to weather conditions. The extra weeks at home were filled in with performances and a presentation. In April, Marriott first played Hamlet in New York and shortly afterwards at the Park Theatre, Brooklyn. The Brooklyn Daily Eagle noted that she was received politely and appeared to be a rather traditional actress, if not old-fashioned, although she performed "intelligently and well." On the other hand, she had "a tall commanding figure and, in this role, a fine manly bearing, and she took the part of a youthful prince to perfection ... She (had) a rich deep toned voice, and her elocution (was) admirable."

In May 1869 Alice Marriott became "seriously ill in New York, and (was) prevented from acting," then Robert Edgar "broke a blood vessel, and (was) also laid up for some time." Following this, in June, various London newspapers received erroneous news from America that Robert Edgar had died. A few days later, Edgar bemusedly sent his denial from the Rochester Theatre, New York, where Alice Marriott was starring in Hamlet and Jeanie Deans. At around the same time, in June, in the middle of the tour, the South London Press had this to say:

There was a time when, at the Surrey, she carried all before her, and gave promise of being one of our best tragic actresses of the sterner kind ... Last year she departed for America on a starring tour. That venture, I hear with regret, was not very successful. The Americans are capricious, and their taste has been vitiated by burlesque and sensation even to a greater extent than that of English audiences, and the reception accorded the lady was not such as her abilities deserved.

Possibly partly in response to the pending Court case against him about non-payment of beer money, Edgar returned to London in August 1869 to "open Sadler's Wells for the forthcoming winter season," while Alice Marriot remained in America, "to fulfil her engagements." Alice returned at the beginning of September, to coincide with the reopening of the theatre.

In December of the same year, there was another Court case in London concerning a committee's non-payment to the sculptor who had been commissioned to produce a marble bust of Alice Marriott. This bust, sculpted by Charles Bacon, was known as the Marriott Testimonial Bust. It was given before her departure to America, as a presentation in honour of the completion of her six years of management of Sadler's Wells. By order of the Court, the sculpture was paid for, Robert Edgar promising to contribute half the cost, but its present whereabouts is unknown.

Alice Marriott was still a working actress when she died.

== Reviews and commentaries ==
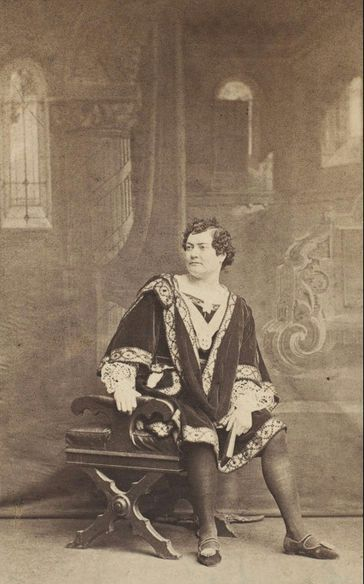
Marriott as Hamlet, 1864

In Women as Hamlet (2007), Tony Howard attempts to explain the 19th century public respect awarded to the onstage juxtaposition of worthy Shakespearean acting and the willingness of women such as Alice Marriott, Julia Seaman and Millicent Bandmann-Palmer to display their legs in doublet and hose. These showed "matronly moral worth, ... images of probity ... as an expression of masculine will ... as wisdom ... and also male impersonation ... Hamlet was their passport to exploring the mind onstage with dignity, and indeed after a century of fugitive performances and jeux d'esprits Alice Marriott made the female Hamlet respectable in England." He quotes reviews of her 1859 tour: "She has made it a creation - a thing of beauty," and "As regards Miss Marriott's portrayal of the young prince, I would almost be induced to say it was perfect." Of her Hamlet at the Theatre Royal, Marylebone in 1861, it was said: "Her figure is imposing and her carriage is, if not quite masculine, sufficient for stage purposes." Her Hamlet was "sober," "brought up on the dignity and refinement of a Court," with "a cultivated mind and a sensitive temperament" and "extraordinary gentleness." She was noted for her "careful study" and "elecutionary clarity." Howard notes that "everyone remembered her voice." He records that she gave "fresh significance to passages that might have escaped the notice of a cursory student ... Her To be or not to be was often applauded - not for originality but for chasteness of expression." By 1899 critics were recalling the "gravitas and musicality" of her Hamlet. John H. Bartlett has said on the subject of women playing male roles, "As there are so few roles of stature in the classical repertoire, it seems only fair to allow anyone capable of playing a part to do so."

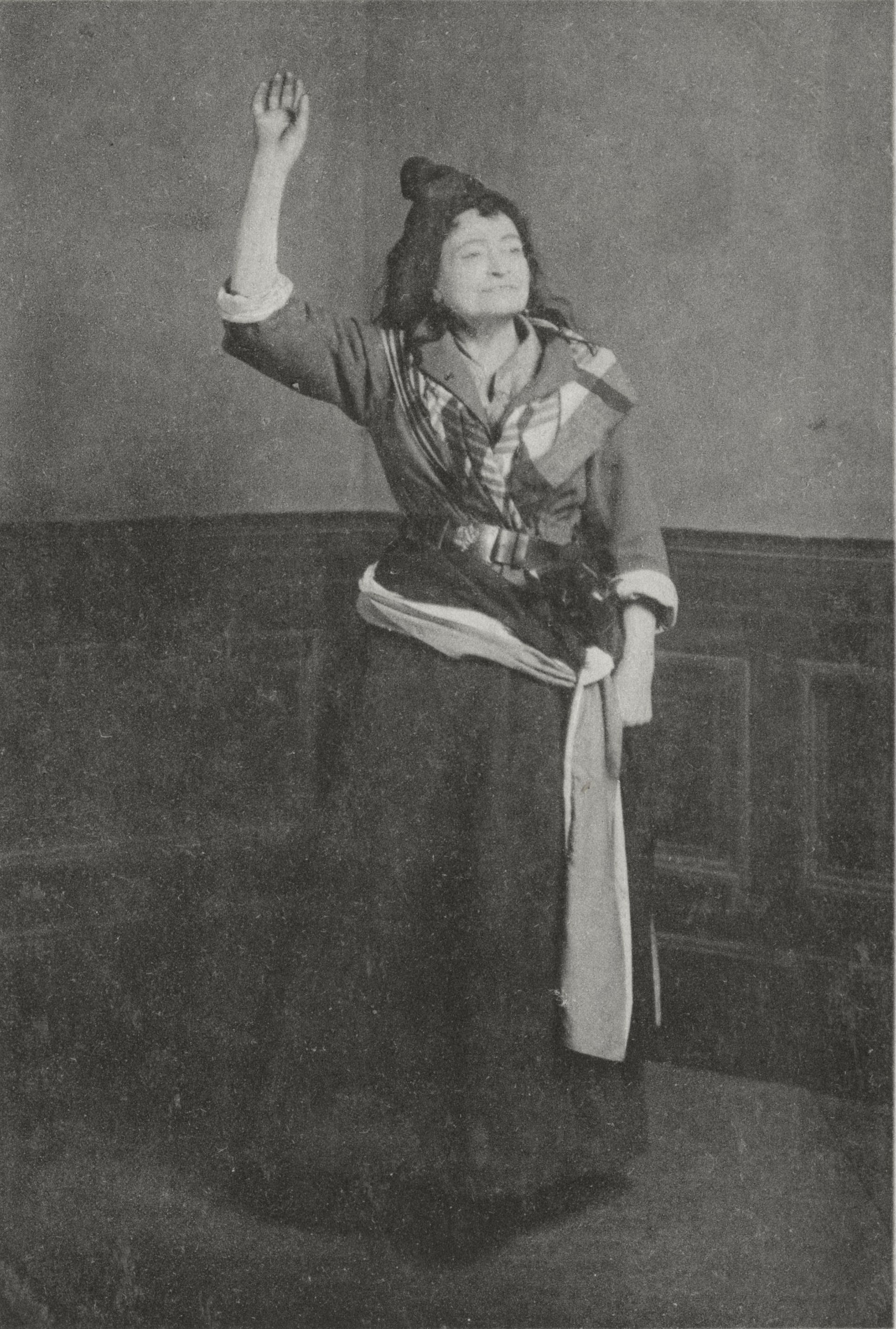
Marriott as Vengeance in The Only Way

In November 1867, the Illustrated London News said: "At Sadler's Wells, Macbeth and The School for Scandal have been revived ... Miss Marriott, as Lady Macbeth, acted with her usual force ... (In Sheridan's play) the character of Lady Teazle was vigorously supported by Miss Marriott." In February 1869, The Era said: "Miss Marriott's performance of Hamlet is too well-known to need criticism; suffice it to say that she was called before the curtain after almost every act. In May 1869 while Marriott was in America, Reynold's Newspaper commented: "Miss Alice Marriott, who has just closed an engagement at Wood's Theatre, is a woman of about forty years of age, and of large dramatic experience. She is the wife of Robert Edgar, or "Bob" as he is called by his intimates, who is himself a decided character ... His attachment to his talented wife verges almost on adoration, and he at once conceives a violent attachment for anybody who professionally admires her.

In September 1890, when Marriott was 66 years old and playing Ravenswood at the Lyceum, the London Illustrated News said: "Perhaps best of all (was) the Ailsie Gourlay of Miss Marriott, who had the most difficult task of all to perform, and did it admirably. I tremble to think what would have happened to the play if this old Scotch prophetess had not been an actress of rare and ripe experience. And oh! if the younger generation would only go to the Lyceum and hear how Miss Marriott speaks verse! Every word she has to speak is distinctly heard in every corner of the house."

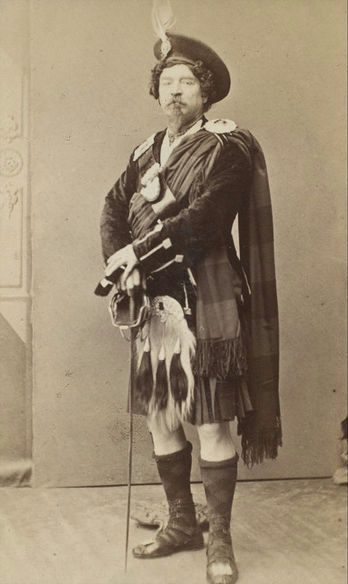
Marriott in a kilt, 1864

The New Zealand Railways Magazine (1939) described her thus: "A rather masculine woman, with a fine presence and considerable talent, a beautiful voice and a phenomenal memory, she was playing for over forty years, and she had an enormous repertoire of long and difficult roles. She had dramatic intensity to a degree, and as an emotional actress had a high reputation." "An actress of the old school, Miss Marriott was well known to Scottish audiences, her impersonation of the title role of Jeanie Deans being famous. She had a true appreciation of Scottish humour and pathos ... Among her last appearances in the north - about the end of September 1892 - she delighted large audiences by her delineation of the role of Helen Macgregor in Rob Roy. In her obituary, the Sunderland Daily Echo recalled: "One of her most remarkable performances (was) that of Effie Deans in The Heart of Midlothian. Her grandson Marriott Edgar said that she was an "impressive Vengeance in The Only Way, but the part of Jeannie Deans was her "most artistic success."

== Legacy ==
- Marriott served as a model for the characters Avonia Bunn and Violet Sylvester in Arthur Wing Pinero's comic play about an 1860s Sadler's Wells melodramatic actress, Trelawny of the 'Wells' (1898).
- Inspired by the female-Hamlet tradition, William Missouri Downs has written a comic play, Women Playing Hamlet (ca.2015).
