= James Henry Marriott =

New Zealand theatre manager (1799–1886)

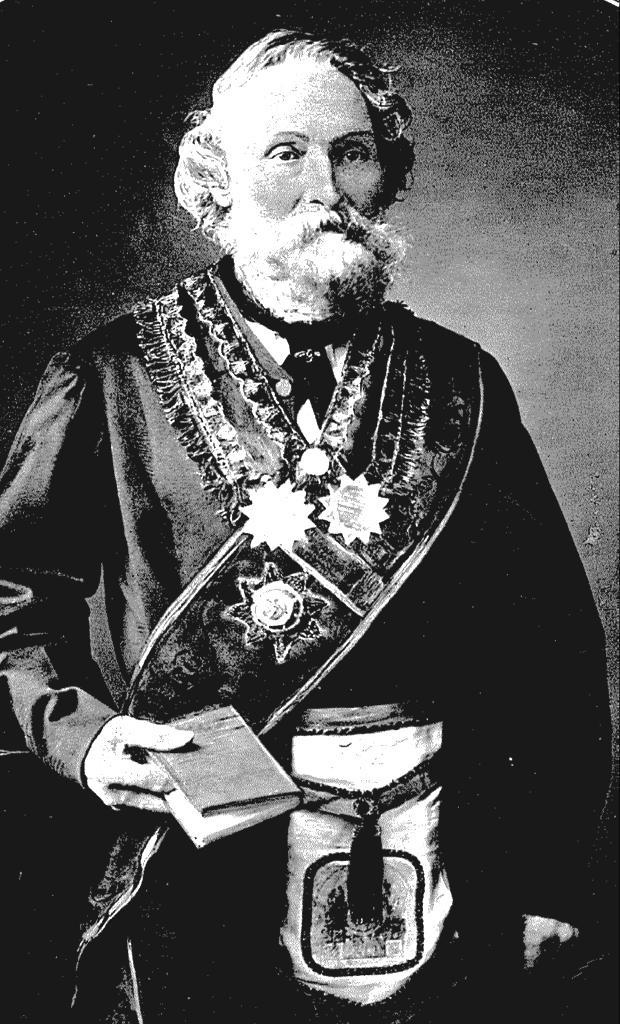
- Marriott in Odd Fellows' costume
- Born: 1799; London, England
- Died: 25 August 1886 (aged 86–87); Wellington, New Zealand
- Occupations: Theatre manager, playwright, optician etc.
- Children: Alice Marriott

James Henry Marriott (1799 – 25 August 1886) was a New Zealand theatre manager, actor, entertainer, playwright, songwriter, engraver, optician and bookseller. He was born in London, England, and arrived in New Zealand three years after the Wellington area was first settled. In Wellington he was involved with theatrical production at the Ship Hotel, Olympic Theatre, Britannia Saloon and Royal Lyceum. He made himself useful in the early days of the settlement by engraving tombstones, engraving illustrations for newspapers, and grinding lenses for telescopes. He ran a bookshop and sold sheet music, and contributed to the organised social and civic life of Wellington. In New Zealand he was the first regular producer of plays, a playwright (his play Marcilina premiered in 1848), and the first optics professional in that country to make a telescope. He was the father of Alice Marriott and the great-grandfather of Marriott Edgar and Edgar Wallace.

== Background ==
Marriott's parents were Leeds optician William Marriott and Alice McGuinness. His wife was Sarah Bateman (died Wellington, 1885), whom he married on 19 May 1822 in Hackney, London. The second of their three daughters was actress Alice Marriott, born on 17 December 1824 in London, and they had two sons also. He was the great-grandfather of Marriott Edgar and Edgar Wallace.

In July 1842, Marriott left his family and sailed through gales and wrecks with a drunken captain on the 497-ton barque Thomas Sparks. He disembarked at Port Nicholson, New Zealand, nearly seven months later on 31 January 1843, when Wellington was still a new town of three years. Ten years after that, his wife and two of their children joined him. On 25 August 1886, he died in Wellington after a few days' illness.

== Career in London ==
In London, Marriott had "learned from his father the skills of optician and mathematical instrument maker", and possibly also his engraving skills, but initially became a reporter for The Times newspaper. At the same time he was producing Shakespeare plays, and was involved in acting, painting and music.

== Career in New Zealand ==
=== Theatrical production ===
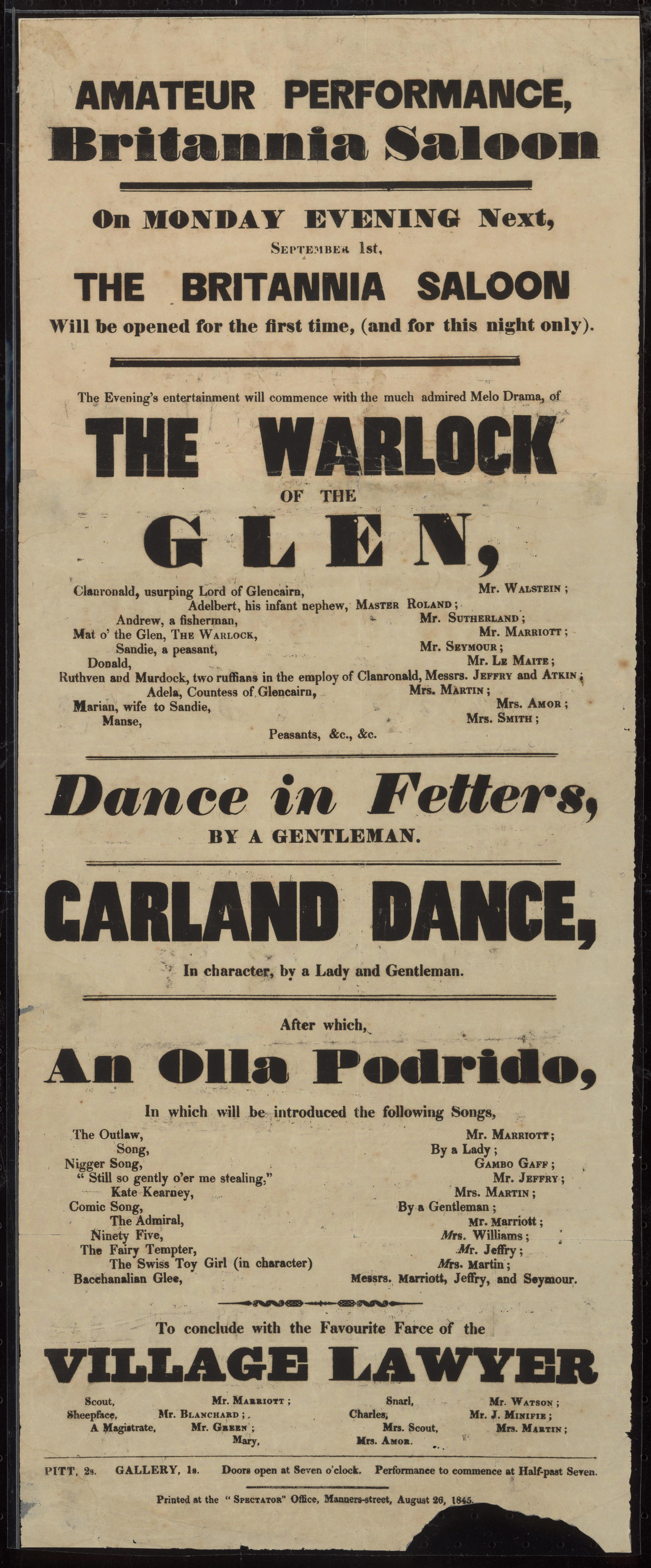
1845 playbill for Britannia Saloon

Having arrived in New Zealand in January 1843, it took him only four months to organise his first series of theatrical productions which opened at the Ship Hotel, Wellington, on 11 May 1843. There had been no previous attempt at regular performances of plays in New Zealand. Encouraged and assisted by Marriott, the publican erected the temporary Royal Victoria Theatre behind the Ship, and it opened on 12 September 1843. Marriott managed that theatre, which was closed after two months. He was co-designer of the Olympic Theatre in Wellington. He decorated it, and was responsible for the scenery and the whale oil gas for lighting purposes. With his associate Rowland Davis he opened the Britannia Saloon theatre in Willis Street, Wellington, in September 1845, as well as the Aurora Tavern which later became the Royal Lyceum Theatre. Rather than management, Marriott's involvement was mainly concerned with directing, producing, scene-painting, and general performance, i.e. music, dancing, singing and acting.

=== Writing ===
On 11 July 1848 at the Britannia Saloon, Marriott's company premiered his play, Marcilina. According to the Dictionary of New Zealand Biography, this is believed to have been the first performance of a play written by a New Zealander.

During the prelude to the re-election of Isaac Featherston as Wellington Superintendent, Marriott wrote in Featherston's support The Constitutional Budget of 1858, made up of poems and political songs.

=== Optical instruments and engraving ===
At Bolton Street Cemetery there are examples of his engraved tombstones. He also engraved illustrations of events in the town, because engravings could at that time be reproduced in newspapers and magazines. For example, he engraved illustrations of public dinners and of the laying of the cornerstone of Wellington's Provincial Hall.

It was his brother William Marriott II who inherited their father's business, but James had nevertheless learned the skills. Working as an optician would have provided him with regular income, but he was also an instrument maker. He was the first person to make telescopes in New Zealand, having made at least one marine telescope by 1844, possibly in response to the Great Comet C/1844 Y1 of December 1844 and January 1845. He did not make many of them. He did, however, give a lecture on the subject at the Wellington Athenaeum and Mechanics' Institute in August 1852. Between 1849 and 1875 he advertised his spectacles, telescopes, sextants, compasses and engraving in The Wellington Independent.

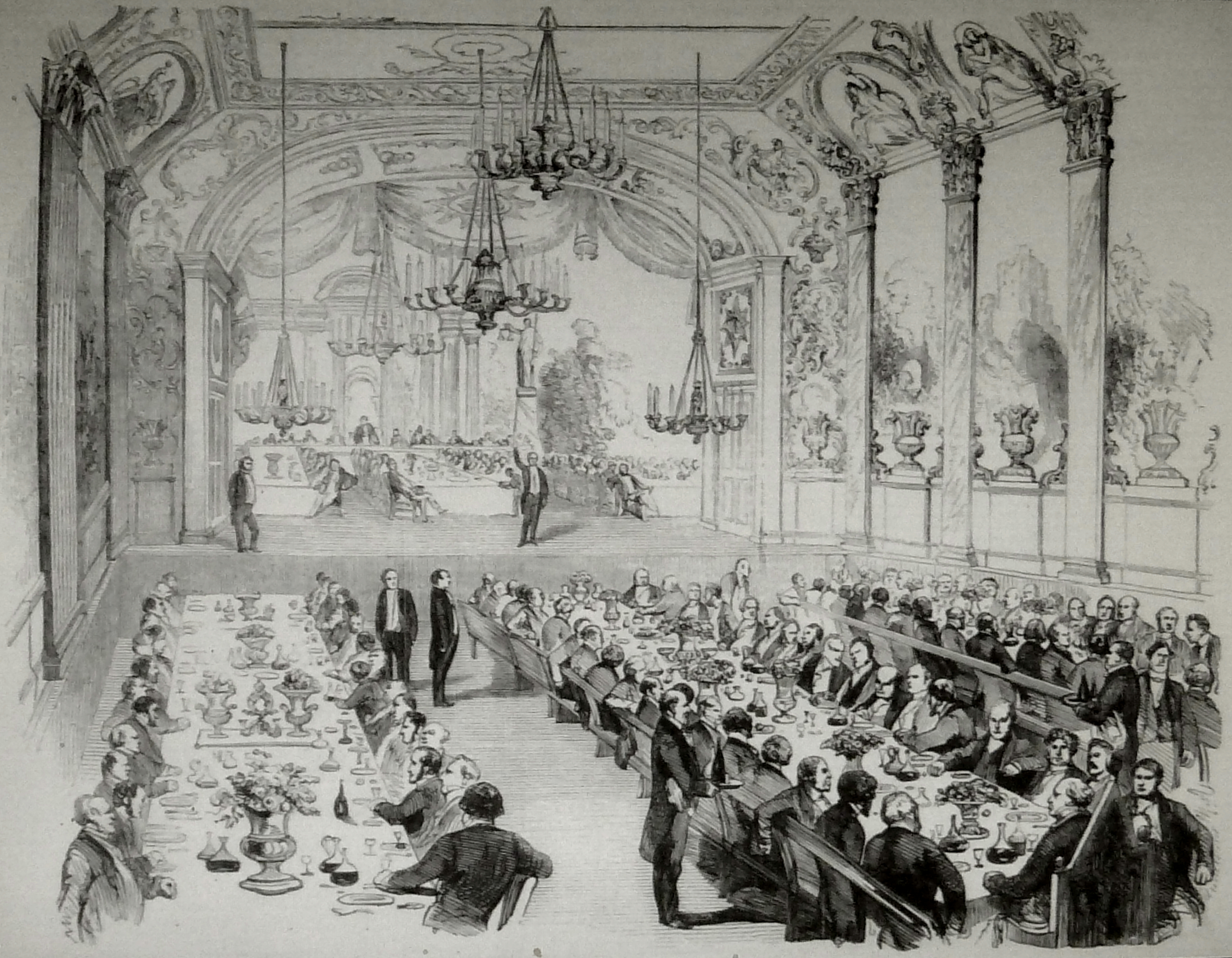
Marriott's engraving of the Royal Lyceum Theatre, 1849

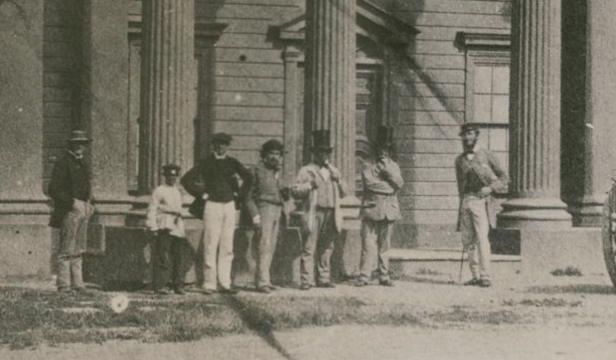
Marriott, fifth from left in stove pipe hat, holding his lapels, stands before the neo-classical (but wooden) Oddfellows Hall, 1860s

=== Business, civic and social contribution ===
Marriott reckoned that he "did a bit of everything, from chiselling tombstones to putting in ladies' teeth." On Lambton Quay, Marriott had a bookshop and stationery business, which also sold music, between around 1853 and 1885. He worked for the Tradesmen's Club and the Mechanics' Institute. In 1843, along with his associate Rowland Davis, he was one of the founders of Wellington's Oddfellows Order. His civic duties included "sergeant at arms, inspector of weights and measures, registrar of cattle brands and registrar of dogs." "At most public dinners [Marriott] was employed in arranging the entertainment and decorating the hall."
