= Jeanie Deans (poem) =

The poem "Jeanie Deans" was written by Carolina Oliphant (Lady Nairne) (1766–1845). It eulogizes Jeanie Deans, the heroine of Sir Walter Scott's 1818 novel, The Heart of Midlothian. However, it appears to be unfinished as it ends with Jeanie 'wending' her way to London where she later obtains the pardon she seeks from the Queen for her sister and the story does not end there. For the full story see Jeanie Deans.

St. Leonard's hill was lightsome land, Where gowan'd grass was growin', For man and beast were food and rest, And milk and honey flowin'. A father's blessing followed close, Where'er her foot was treading, And Jeanie's humble, harmless joys, On every side were spreading wide, On every side were spreading. The mossy turf on Arthur Seat, St. Anthon's well aye springing, The lammies playing at her feet, The birdies round her singing.	The solemn haunts o' Holyrood, Wi' bats and houlits eerie, The tow'ring craigs o' Salisbury, The lowly wells o' Weary, O, the lowly wells o' Weary. But evil days and evil men Came owre their sunny dwelling, Like thunder storms on sunny skies Or wastefu' waters swelling. What ance was sweet is bitter now;	The sun of joy is setting; In eyes that wont to glance wi' glee, — The briny tear is wetting fast, The briny tear is wetting. Her inmost thought to heaven is sent, In faithful supplication; Her earthly stay's Macallummore, The guardian o' the nation. A hero's heart — a sister's love — They're a' in Jeanie's tartan plaid, And she is gane, her liefu' lane, To Lunnon toun she's wending.
