= PS Jeanie Deans =

Clyde-built paddle steamer (1931 - 1967)

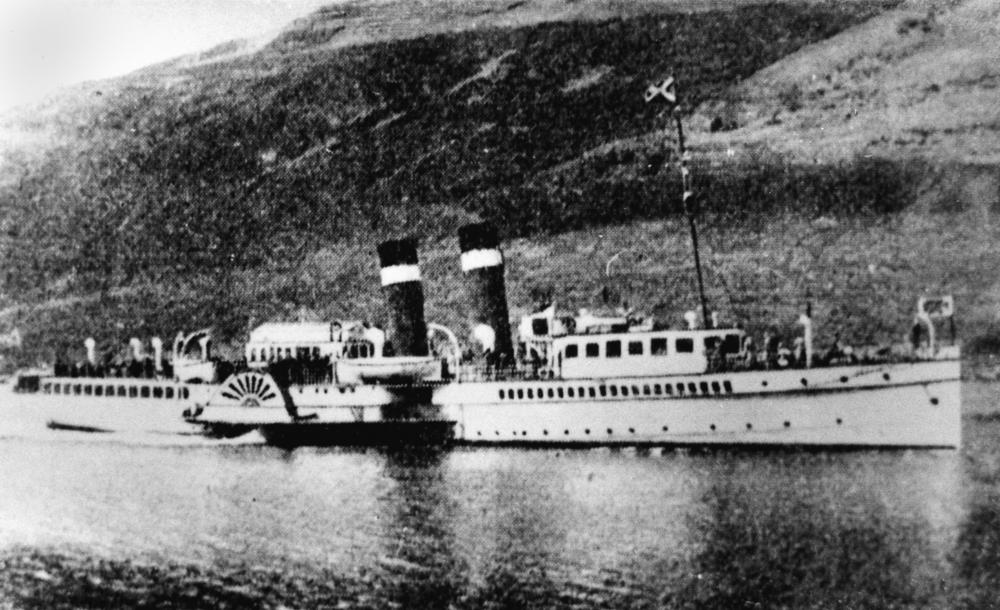
- Jeanie Deans

History

United Kingdom
- Name: PS Jeanie Deans (1931-1964); PS Queen of the South (1964-1967)
- Owner: 1931- 47: London and North Eastern Railway; 1948-51: British Transport Commission; 1951-65: Caledonian Steam Packet Company; 1965-68: Coastal Steam Packet Co Ltd, London
- Operator: London and North Eastern Railway
- Builder: Fairfield Shipbuilding and Engineering Company, Govan
- Cost: £52,650
- Yard number: 644
- Launched: 7 April 1931
- In service: 1931
- Out of service: 1967
- Renamed: Queen of the South
- Home port: Glasgow
- Fate: Sold for scrap, December 1967

General characteristics
- Class & type: Paddle steamer
- Tonnage: 635 GRT; 259 NRT
- Length: 76.35 m (250 ft 6 in)
- Beam: 9.16 m (30 ft 1 in)
- Installed power: Three-crank diagonal triple expansion (26, 41.5 and 66 in x 60 in)
- Propulsion: Paddle
- Speed: 18.5 kn (max)

PS Jeanie Deans was a Clyde paddle steamer, built in 1931 for the London and North Eastern Railway. She was a popular boat, providing summer cruises from Craigendoran until 1964.

== History ==
PS Jeanie Deans was built for the London and North Eastern Railway in 1931 to compete with the CSP turbine steamer, Duchess of Montrose. She was built by the Fairfield Shipbuilding and Engineering Company, Govan, as a paddler, rather than the more popular turbine steamer, allowing her a shallow draught to visit Craigendoran and Helensburgh. She took the name of an earlier fleet member, continuing the tradition of the North British Railway naming their vessels after characters from Sir Walter Scott's novels; Jeanie Deans being a character in Scott's The Heart of Midlothian.

=== Jeanie Deans (1884) ===
An earlier Clyde steamer of the same name was built by Barclay Curle & Co in 1884 for the North British Steam Packet Co. She operated out of Craigendoran until 1896, when she was sold for service on Lough Foyle. Returning to the Clyde in 1899, as Duchess of York she ran cruises from Glasgow, becoming Isle of Cumbrae in 1904 and serving Rothesay.

From 1916, she was chartered to the Glasgow and South Western Railway and operated between Princes Pier and Dunoon. She did not return to peacetime service and was broken up at Dumbarton in 1920.

== Layout ==
Jeanie Deans was the first Clyde steamer with a three-crank engine, giving a speed of 18.5 knot in trials.

As built, she had two small deckhouses, one forward, supporting the open bridge and one aft of the twin funnels, covering the companionway.

After her first season, a large first class observation saloon was added forward on the promenade deck, providing welcome shelter during poor weather. The funnels were also lengthened to reduce the cinders deposited on passengers.

After war service, she was extensively refitted, including a new deckhouse, increasing tonnage to 814.

During the winter of 1956/7, she was converted from coal to oil burning and radar was also installed a year later in 1960.

== Service ==
Jeanie Deans was built for summer cruising from Craigendoran. In 1931, she took up the company's flagship Lochgoilhead and Arrochar service. On Sundays, she provided cruises down the Firth. These lower Firth cruises were extended from the 1932 season, visiting Ayr and offering cruises around Ailsa Craig and bringing her into direct contact with the Duchess of Hamilton.

By the outbreak of war, she was the longest and fastest paddle steamer on the Firth. She was requisitioned by the government and saw war service as a minesweeper and operated initially as flotilla leader of the 11th Minesweeping Flotilla first at Ardrossan then from Portland, Dorset, during the Battle of Britain in 1940. At the end of the year, she was docked at Milford Haven for repair to storm damage. In April 1941, she went to the Royal Albert Dock in London for conversion to an anti aircraft vessel, entering service in the following month in the Thames Local Defence Flotilla during the final phase of the London Blitz. She remained on that station, later being used against V-1 flying bombs approaching London, claiming three shot down.

She was returned to her owners late in 1944 and resumed to her peacetime duties in 1946; she launched the popular "Round Bute" cruise in the 1950s. Jeanie Deans was withdrawn after the 1964 season and sold for further cruising on the River Thames. As Queen of the South, she operated for the Coastal Steam Packet Company until 1967, but technical problems made the new venture a failure.

In December 1967, she left the Thames for breaking up at Antwerp, Belgium.

== Legacy ==
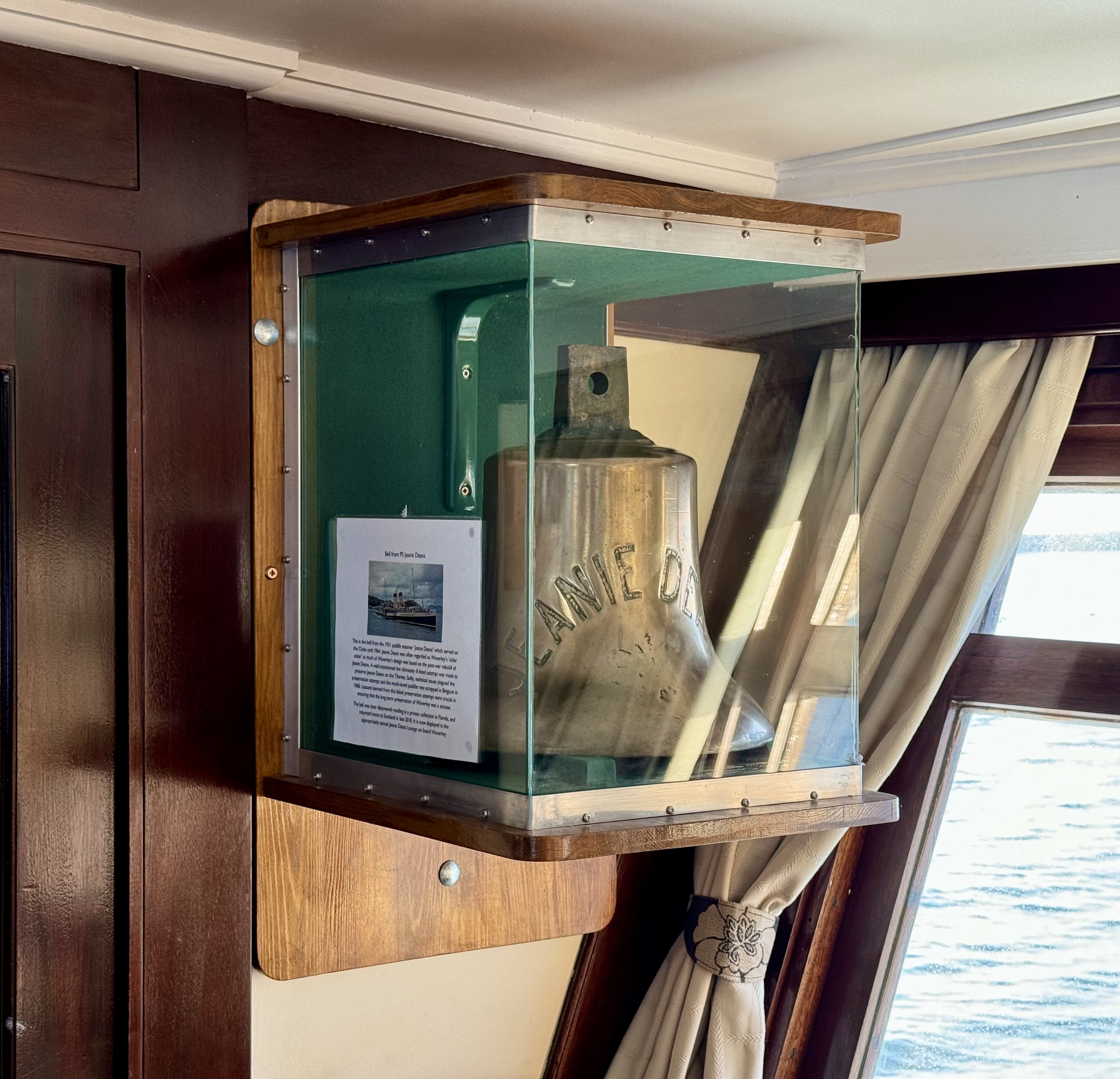
Bell of PS Jeanie Deans preserved in a display case within the Jeanie Deans bar on PS Waverley

A clockwork model of the second Jeanie Deans is central to the plot of Down the Bright Stream by BB.

The ship was memorialised by the Battlefield Band in the song "The Bonny Jeannie Deans" on their 2002 album Time and Tide.
