= William Henry Pennington =

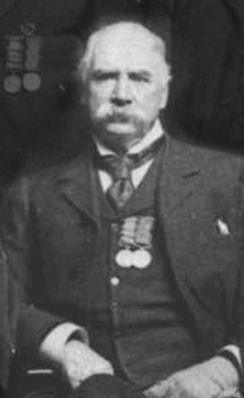
William Henry Pennington in 1890

William Henry Pennington, also known as W. H. Pennington (26 January 1833 – 1 May 1923) was a soldier in the British Army who during the Crimean War took part in the famous Charge of the Light Brigade in 1854. On leaving the Army he became a Shakespearean actor and in 1870 was the lessee and manager of Sadler's Wells Theatre. After a performance in Hamlet he became known as 'Gladstone's Favourite Tragedian'.

== Early life ==
Pennington was born in Greenwich in London in 1833, the son of Margaret née Sullivan (1807–1890) and Albert Pennington (1810–1874), a civil servant who later set up a school on Shacklewell Lane in Hackney. Albert Pennington trained his son to be a schoolmaster with the intention of passing the school on to him in the future. However, William Henry had a taste for adventure and as a youth joined the Mercantile Marine, serving for about three years on various ships and sailing as far as Australia, the East Indies, Java and Singapore. On leaving the Mercantile Marine he enlisted in the 11th Hussars on 24 January 1854 at Portobello Barracks in Dublin with the regimental number 1631. Before joining the Light Cavalry Brigade his previous experience on horseback had been 'a pony ride on Blackheath' as a boy.

== Military service ==
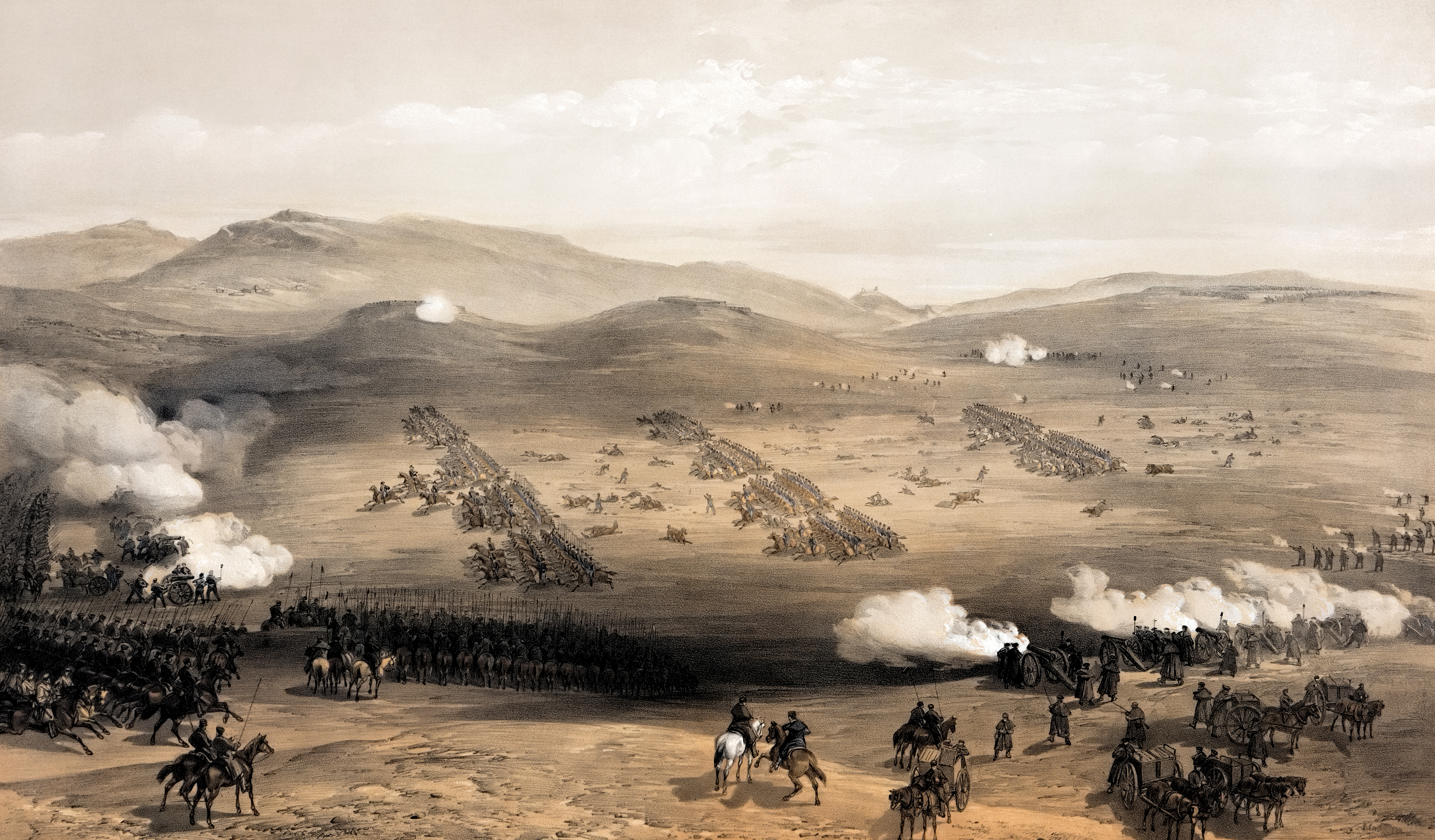
The Charge of the Light Brigade at Balaklava by William Simpson (1855), illustrating the Light Brigade's charge into the "Valley of Death" from the Russian perspective

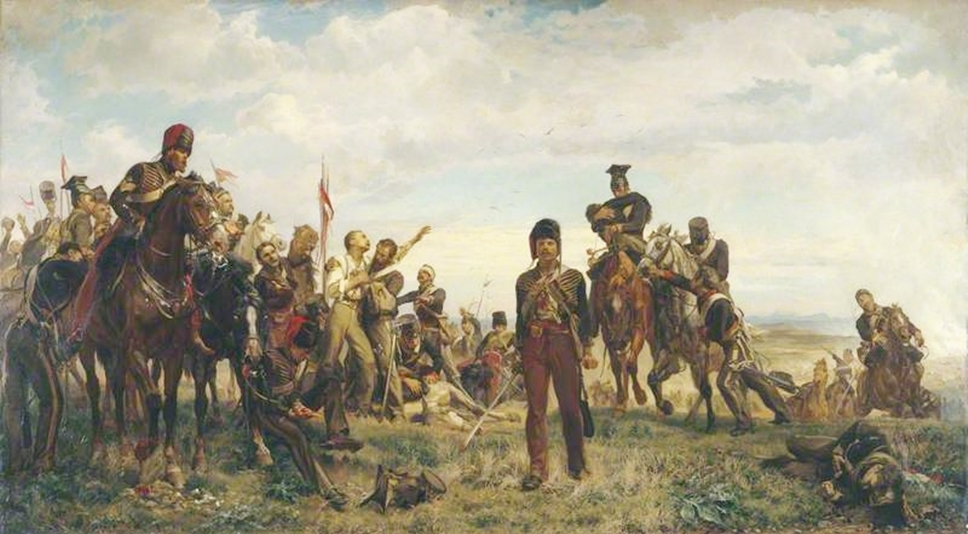
'Balaclava' by Elizabeth Thompson (1876). Pennington is the central figure holding the sword

Pennington was among the first of his regiment to leave for the Crimean War in 1854, travelling with the baggage party and some 60 men and their mounts. On 25 October 1854 he took part in the Charge of the Light Brigade during which he was injured with a musket ball in his right calf. Pennington wrote an account of his experience in the Charge during which his horse Black Bess was killed beneath him with a bullet through the head. Although wounded with a shot to the leg he managed to limp away from danger, determined 'to sell my life as dearly as I might'. While still a mile away from the starting point of the Charge and in a great deal of pain with his leg he was given a loose horse by some men of the 8th Hussars with whom he fought his way back up the 'Valley of Death' until he lost contact with them.

His letter to his father describing the Charge was published in The Times, among other newspapers:

'I was surprised to hear that no letter had reached you, as I wrote a month ago since, describing the Light Cavalry charge on the 25th October as far as it concerned myself. My wound was from a musket ball through the calf of my right leg, but so far has healed that I began to walk upon it an hour or so in the day. It was a mad but gallant charge made by our Light Cavalry at Balaclava.

The newspapers will let you see our position at the time. The word was given to "Charge guns to the front." We advanced at a gallop to these guns, and a fearful fire of grape, shell and canister, with ditto on the right and left flanks and infantry pouring in a dreadful fire; horses and men fell thick and fast, but even this did not check our onward rush. All the Russian infantry artillery men were sabred and for an instant we were masters of the guns, but having no support, could not hold them.

In this condition we were charged to flank and rear by numerous regiments of Russian cavalry and but for the desperation with which our men met their way there would not have been a single man retire from that fatal charge.

As for myself, I never reached the guns in front as a grape shot went through my busby, about two inches above my head, knocking it to one side, another ball through the calf of my leg and the next through my horse's head (a fine black mare).

I was now at the mercy of their Lancers, whom I saw lancing wounded and dismounted men. The demons give you no quarter when you are down. At this moment the 8th Hussars came by with a horse without a rider. This I mounted, and formed in the rear of the 8th as if it were my own regiment, dashed on. But worse again - we were obliged to wheel "Right about" and to pass through a strong body of their cavalry which had gathered in our rear, and cutting off our retreat.

Of course, with our handful, it was life or death, so we rushed at them to break through, but as soon as we got through one body there was another to engage. At any rate, with five or six fellows at my rear I galloped on, passing with the determination of one who would not lose his life, breaking the lances of the cowards who attacked us in the proportion of three or four to one, occasionally catching one a slap with a sword across his teeth, and giving another the point on his arm or breast.

They still pressed on me till I got sight of our own "Heavies" when, thanks be to God, they stopped pursuing us, and I got clear, without a scratch from their lances ... (Oh, the sabre before the lance!)

I found that I could not dismount from the wound in my right leg, and so was lifted off, and then how I caressed the noble horse that brought me safely out. I will not disgrace you as a soldier, father, take my word.'

Pennington was in Florence Nightingale's Scutari Hospital during April to May 1855 and became the Camp Cook at Scutari in July 1855. Pennington was invalided back to Great Britain in June 1856 and purchased his discharge from the Army in September the same year having served 2 years and 240 days. Pennington took part in the Battles of the Alma, Balaclava and the Siege of Sebastopol.

== Personal life ==
In 1857 he married Frances Emma née Harford (1832–1896) in Hackney. They had 11 children: Louisa Mary Pennington (1858–1956); Florence Emma Pennington (1861–1926); Albert William Pennington (1863–1914); Percy Pennington (1865–1958); Alice Margaret Pennington (born 1869–1950); Harold Pennington (1869–1955); Kate Pennington (1871-1871); Catherine Gladstone Pennington (1872–1935); Margaret Grace Pennington (1873–1878); Amy Pennington (born 1874), and Marion Elizabeth Pennington (1878-1878).

In 1876 Pennington posed for Lady Butler's painting 'Balaclava' (sometimes called 'After the Charge') in which he is the central figure holding a sword. In her painting Butler uses dramatic and artistic licence in her portrayal of Pennington who in his own account relates that he was unable to walk because of the wound to his leg and had to be lifted from the saddle. Rather, her aim appears to be to capture the look of shock on Pennington's face.

== Theatrical career ==
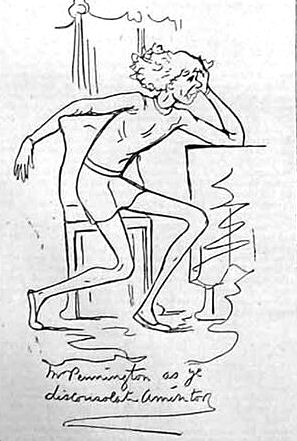
Pennington depicted in The Illustrated Sporting and Dramatic News (1875)

On leaving the Army Pennington briefly worked as a clerk in the Post Office before embarking on a career on the stage, becoming a dramatic actor. His first appearance was at the New Royalty Theatre in London in 1861 before appearing in Othello (1862), The Lady of Lyons and The Doge of Venice, and Macbeth in 1867. His theatrical ventures were not always successful as was the case with his management of the Greenwich Theatre in 1862. In 1869 he appeared in The Hunchback at Sadlers Wells Theatre in London. In 1870 he was the lessee and manager of Sadlers Wells where on 15 January 1870 under his management Alice Marriott appeared as Julia, in The Hunchback, performing in The Lady of Lyons and Fazio there in the same week. For a period he acted at the Theatre Royal, Drury Lane, appearing as a giant in one pantomime there. In 1870 he was initiated into Freemasonry and in 1902 was a member of Royal Alfred Lodge No. 780. In 1871 Pennington played in King Lear and Hamlet following which he became known as 'Gladstone's Favourite Tragedian' after W. E. Gladstone commented that Pennington's Hamlet was the most original he had ever seen. However, Pennington's performances were not always appreciated by London audiences.

In the 1870s and 1880s Pennington was reduced to performing in provincial theatres, playing Richard III at Norwich Theatre in 1877, and on occasions would recite Tennyson's poem 'The Charge of the Light Brigade' on stage while wearing the uniform he had worn in the Charge. He would also recite the poem at the annual Balaclava Dinners held for the survivors of the Charge. Pennington gave his last dramatic performance at the Avenue Theatre on 12 December 1891. From 1892 he was a teacher of Elocution and Dramatic Art at the Birbeck School in Dalston.

== Later years ==
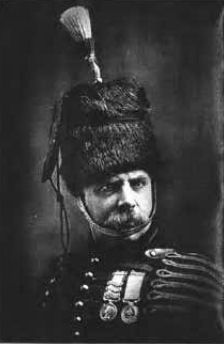
Pennington in later life wearing his 11th Hussars uniform and Crimean War medals

In 1897 his three-bar Crimean War Medal and Turkish Crimea Medal were stolen in a burglary. Several days later they were returned to him in the post with a letter of apology saying, 'I return your medals. I was very sorry to have taken them, not knowing what they was at the time. They would only have brought me in 4/-, so you can send me the money on by return of post.' It is believed the medals are now with the Regimental Museum of the 11th Hussars. Little is known of his latter years. He sent a copy of his privately published account of the Charge Left of Six Hundred to Queen Victoria in 1887. The book is in the Royal Collection.

The 1901 Census records him as an 'Actor and Elocutionist' living with his son Harold and daughter Louisa, while that for 1911 lists him as a 'Tragedian (Retired)' living in Tottenham still with his son and daughter. On 25 October 1913 he was among six survivors of the Charge to attend the 'Balaclava Dinner' to commemorate the 59th anniversary of the Battle of Balaclava, 25 October 1913. This was the last annual dinner to be held.

William Henry Pennington died at his home at 34 Albion Road in Stoke Newington from an illness following a stroke in May 1923 and was buried with his family in Abney Park Cemetery. He was the last surviving member of the 11th Hussars to have taken part in the Charge and the second to last survivor of the Charge leaving Edwin Hughes of the 13th Light Dragoons as the last survivor.
