= Bill Badger and the Pirates =

1960 novel by Denys Watkins-Pitchford

- First edition cover
- Author: BB
- Illustrator: Denys Watkins-Pitchford
- Language: English
- Genre: Fantasy novel
- Publisher: Hamish Hamilton
- Publication date: 1960
- Publication place: United Kingdom
- Media type: Print (Hardback & Paperback)
- Pages: 138
- ISBN: 0-416-26760-2
- OCLC: 12377884
- Preceded by: Bill Badger's Winter Cruise
- Followed by: Bill Badger's Finest Hour

Bill Badger and the Pirates is a children's novel with a canal-side setting, written and illustrated in 1960 by the prolific author Denys Watkins-Pitchford, who wrote under the pen name "BB".

The plot revolves around the release from prison of Bill Badger's sworn enemy, the cat Napoleon, and his attempt to capture Bill's barge, Wandering Wind. The novel blends a stirring story with deeper moral issues.

Bill Badger and the Pirates is the third in the Bill Badger series, which ran to eight books over a decade from the first in 1957 (Wandering Wind, reprinted as Bill Badger and the Wandering Wind). The final in the series was Bill Badger and the Voyage to the World's End of 1969.

== Adaptation ==
In 1970, the Swiss Broadcasting Corporation adapted Bill Badger and the Pirates into an 18-part marionette children's television programme entitled Dominik Dachs und die Katzenpiraten, in Swiss German. It was rebroadcast in March 2012.
