= Jeanie Deans (song) =

"Jeanie Deans" is a song which celebrates Jeanie Deans, the heroine of Sir Walter Scott's 1818 novel, The Heart of Midlothian. It was probably performed in music halls around the end of the 19th century as it is found in a 'broadsheet' of that period. Its musical accompaniment is not given.

Music at JAS. S. KERR'S, 314 Paisley Rd., Glasgow,

Far awa' frae bonnie Scotland,
I have often spent my time,
By the mountains, lakes, and valleys,
In some distant foreign clime.
There I'd sit and sometimes ponder.
'Midst their bright and varied scenes;
But my thoughts would always wander
To the hame o' Jeanie Deans.

CHORUS.

Here's to Auld Reekie, and its glorious Princes Street,
Here's to Auld Reekie, and its famous Arthur Seat;
Here's to Auld Reekie, and its grand Historic Scenes—
The hame of Scotland's bravest lass, my bonnie Jeanie Deans.

Oft I see her sad and dreary,
Wi' tartan plaid and hame-spun gown;
Broken-hearted, worn and weary,
Tramping on to London town.
Leaving those behind who missed her—
Those who know what true love means—
Seeking pardon for her sister,
Brave, true hearted, Jeanie Deans.

Fancy ofttimes brings before me,
Jeanie's simple, winsome style,
As she told me her sad, sad story,
When she met the great Argyle.
Hear her pleading in the garden,
Asking mercy from the Queen;
See her joy, she's got the pardon,
Brave, Victorious, Jeanie Deans.

"Jeanie woman" though departed,
We will keep the honoured name
Of one so true and loyal-hearted,
Written on the scroll of fame.
Sir Walter Scott immortalised you—
"Thou wer't one of nature's queens"—.
And in our hearts we'll ever praise you,
Gallant, Scottish, Jeanie Deans.
