= Jeanie Deans (railway locomotives) =

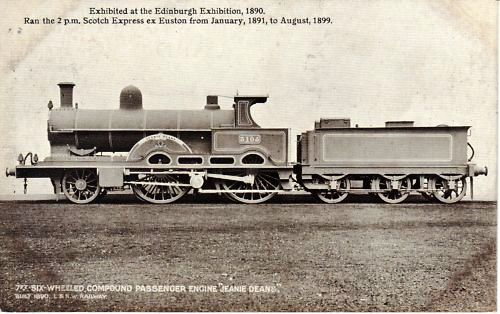
The first "Jeanie Deans" locomotive

Jeanie Deans was the name given to at least two railway locomotives naming them after the fictional character, Jeanie Deans, who featured in Sir Walter Scott's novel, Heart of Midlothian.

== First "Jeanie Deans" Locomotive (1891-1899) ==
LNWR "Jeanie Deans" Locomotive No 3105. This six-wheeled passenger steam engine of the LNWR Teutonic Class was built in 1890 when it was exhibited at the Edinburgh Electrical Exhibition of 1890 at Shandon, Edinburgh. "Jeanie Deans 3105 worked the 2 p.m. Scotch dining train daily from January, 1891, until August, 1899 - with trains weighing 260 to 310 tons, and almost always kept time."

== Second "Jeanie Deans" Locomotive (1909-1949) ==
"Jeanie Deans" locomotive D29 'Scott'. BR no. 62404. This was one of class D29 locomotives which were all named by William Paton Reid (1854–1932) after Waverley novels or characters in these novels. The last D29 was withdrawn in 1952, and none have survived into preservation. This "Jeanie Deans" locomotive was built in 1909 at the NBR works at Cowlairs, Glasgow. It was disposed of in 1949.
