= Denys Watkins-Pitchford =

British naturalist, illustrator and author (1905–1990)

Denys James Watkins-Pitchford MBE (25 July 1905 – 8 September 1990) was an English naturalist, artist and author under the pen name 'BB'. He won the 1942 Carnegie Medal for The Little Grey Men.

== Early life ==
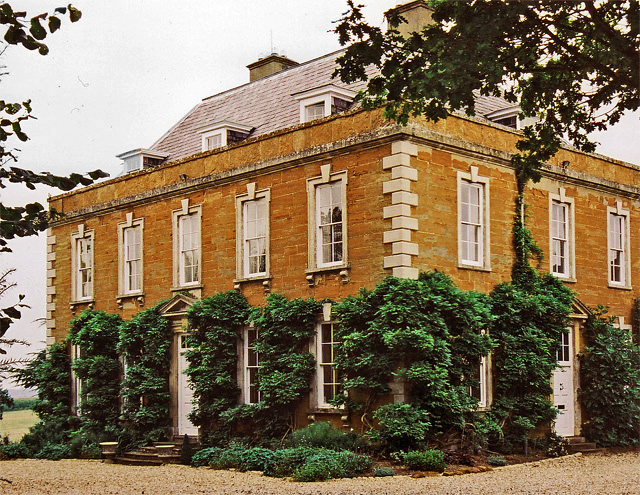
Watkins-Pitchford's childhood home, The Rectory, Lamport

Denys Watkins-Pitchford was born in Lamport, Northamptonshire, the second son of the Revd. Walter Watkins-Pitchford and his wife, Edith. His father was rector of Lamport with Faxton from 1903 until his death in 1944; Faxton's church was dedicated to St Denys. His elder brother, Robert Engelard, died at the age of sixteen. Denys was himself considered to be delicate as a child, and because of this was educated at home, while his younger twin, Roger, was sent away to school. He spent a great deal of time on his own, wandering through the fields, and developed a love of the outdoors. He also enjoyed shooting, fishing and drawing; all these things were to influence his writing.

At the age of fifteen, he left home and went to study at the Northampton School of Art. He won several prizes while there, but was irked by the dry, academic approach, and longed to be able to draw from life. While at the Northampton School of Art, Watkins-Pitchford won a travelling scholarship to Paris. He was later to say that he could not remember how long he had spent in Paris, but Tom Quinn suggests that it was probably about three months. He worked at a studio in Montparnasse, and attended drawing classes. It is unknown exactly where he studied. In the autumn of 1924, he entered the Royal College of Art in London.

In 1930 he became an assistant art master at Rugby School where he remained for seventeen years. While at Rugby School he began contributing to the Shooting Times and started his careers as an author and an illustrator. He wrote under the pen name of 'BB', a name based on the size of lead shot he used to shoot geese, but he maintained the use of his real name as that of the illustrator in all his books. He illustrated books by other writers, mostly using scraperboard, and sold his own paintings locally.

== Later years ==
Watkins-Pitchford married Cecily Adnitt in 1939 in Lamport church; they had two children: Robin, who died at the age of seven from Bright's disease, and Angela. In 1974, his wife became unwell after working in the garden while a farmer was spraying insecticide on the other side of the hedge; she died a few weeks later.

He was awarded an honorary degree by Leicester University in 1986, and was made a Member of the Order of the British Empire (MBE) in the 1989 Birthday Honours.

By the late 1980s, Watkins-Pitchford needed regular dialysis treatment. He collapsed suddenly in September 1990 and died while under anaesthetic in the operating theatre of an Oxford hospital.

== Works ==
The Little Grey Men (1942)

For The Little Grey Men, published by Eyre & Spottiswoode in 1942, 'BB' won the annual Carnegie Medal from the Library Association, recognising the year's best children's book by a British subject.

- (1922) Diary & Sketchbook (Published in 2012)
- (1937) The Sportsman's Bedside Book
- (1938) Wild Lone: The Story of a Pytchley Fox
- (1939) Manka, the Sky Gypsy: The Story of a Wild Goose
- (1941) The Countryman's Bedside Book
- (1942) The Little Grey Men
- (1943) The Idle Countryman
- (1944) Narrow Boat (by L. T. C. Rolt, illustrated by Watkins-Pitchford)
- (1944) Brendon Chase
- (1945) The Fisherman's Bedside Book
- (1945) The Wayfaring Tree
- (1948) Meeting Hill
- (1948) The Shooting Man's Bedside Book
- (1948) A Stream in Your Garden
- (1948) Down the Bright Stream (sequel to The Little Grey Men (1942), later released as The Little Grey Men Go Down the Bright Stream)
- (1949) Be Quiet and Go A-Angling (Pseudonym Michael Traherne)
- (1950) Confessions of a Carp Fisher
- (1950) Letters from Compton Deverell
- (1950) Tide's Ending
- (1952) The Wind in the Wood
- (1953) Dark Estuary
- (1955) The Forest of Boland Light Railway
- (1957) Alexander
- (1957) Ben the Bullfinch
- (1957) Wandering Wind
- (1957) Monty Woodpig's Caravan
- (1958) Monty Woodpig & his Bubblebuzz Car
- (1958) Mr Bumstead
- (1958) A Carp Water (Wood Pool): And How to Fish It
- (1959) The Wizard of Boland
- (1959) Bill Badger's Winter Cruise
- (1959) Autumn Road to the Isles
- (1960) Bill Badger and the Pirates
- (1961) Bill Badger and the Secret Weapon
- (1961) The White Road Westwards
- (1961) The Badgers of Bearshanks
- (1961) Bill Badger's Finest Hour
- (1962) Bill Badger's Whispering Reeds Adventure
- (1962) September Road to Caithness
- (1962) Lepus the Brown Hare
- (1963) Bill Badger's Big Mistake
- (1964) The Pegasus Book of the Countryside
- (1964) Summer Road to Wales
- (1967) Bill Badger and the Big Store Robbery
- (1967) A Summer on the Nene
- (1967) The Whopper
- (1968) At the Back o' Ben Dee
- (1969) Bill Badger's Voyage to the Worlds End
- (1971) The Tiger Tray
- (1975) The Pool of the Black Witch
- (1975) Lord of the Forest
- (1976) Recollections of a Longshore Gunner
- (1978) A Child Alone
- (1979) Ramblings of a Sportsman-Naturalist
- (1980) The Naturalist's Bedside Book
- (1981) The Quiet Fields
- (1984) Indian Summer
- (1985) The Best of BB
- (1987) Fisherman's Folly
- (1990) The Confessions of a Coastal Gunner (published in 2011)

== Motto ==
Inside all his books appeared the quotation:

The wonder of the world
The beauty and the power,
The shapes of things,
Their colours, lights and shades,
These I saw.
Look ye also while life lasts.

This quotation has sometimes been thought to have been another one of 'BB'’s creations but it was copied by his father, supposedly from a tombstone in a north-country churchyard.

The words appeared on a monument to Alexander Morton in Loudoun, Ayrshire, erected in 1927.

== Adaptations of his works ==
In 1975, The Little Grey Men was adapted into a 10-part animated series called Baldmoney, Sneezewort, Dodder and Cloudberry by Anglia Television. Brendon Chase was dramatised into a 13-part series by Southern Television in 1980.

In 1970, the Swiss Broadcasting Corporation adapted Bill Badger and the Pirates into an 18-part marionette children's television programme entitled Dominik Dachs und die Katzenpiraten, in Swiss German. It was rebroadcast in March 2012.

== Legacy ==
The Little Grey Men was one of Syd Barrett's favourite books; an excerpt from it was read at his funeral.

In The Art of Discworld, Terry Pratchett identifies The Little Grey Men and Down the Bright Stream as possible inspiration for the Nac Mac Feegle.
