= Jeanie Deans =

- The Heart of Midlothian character
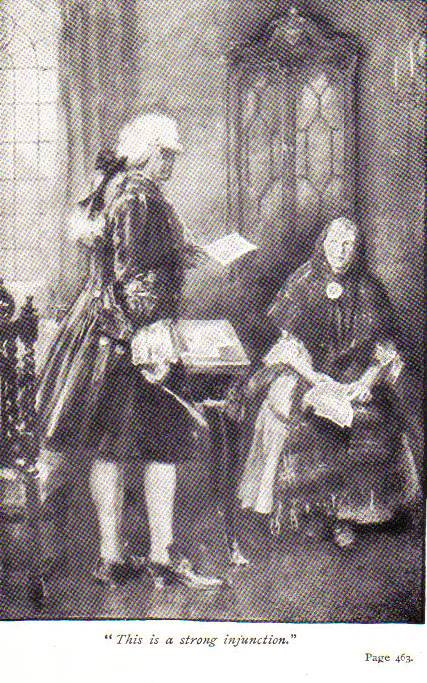
- Jeanie meets the Duke of Argyle in London
- Created by: Sir Walter Scott

In-universe information
- Species: Human
- Gender: Female
- Occupation: Dairy farmer and housewife
- Family: Davie Deans (father)
- Spouse: Reuben Butler (husband)
- Significant other: The Laird of Dumbiedykes
- Children: David (son), Reuben (son), Euphemia (daughter)
- Relatives: Effie (Euphemia) Deans (sister)
- Religion: Christian, Cameronian
- Nationality: Scottish

Jeanie Deans is a fictional character in Sir Walter Scott's novel The Heart of Midlothian first published in 1818. She was one of Scott's most celebrated characters during the 19th century; she was renowned as an example of an honest, upright, sincere, highly religious person. The name "Jeanie Deans" was given to several pubs, ships, railway locomotives, an opera, a play, a poem, a song, a hybrid rose, an antipodean potato, and a geriatric unit in a hospital. They all take their name from Scott's heroine. There was also a so-called Jeanie Deans' Cottage in Edinburgh. It was demolished in 1965.

== Plot ==
When Jeanie Deans' sister, Effie, is wrongly convicted of murdering her own child, Jeanie travels, partly by foot, all the way to London. Her plan is to appeal to Queen Caroline and receive a pardon for her sister who languishes in prison awaiting execution. She begins walking on her bare feet to save her shoes but puts them on when she passes through towns and villages. By a series of improbable adventures, involving the true abductors of her sister's baby son, she finds George Staunton alias Robertson who had fathered the child. Thereafter she travels on by coach and on reaching London she seeks out the Duke of Argyll who takes her to meet Queen Caroline at Richmond Lodge. She impresses the Queen with her eloquence, spoken in broad Scots. The Queen promises to intercede with King George II, and she ensures that her sister is granted a pardon, on pain of being banished from Scotland for fourteen years. When Jeanie returns to Scotland, she finds that the Duke of Argyll had given her father land to superintend at Rosneath in Argyll. She is also overjoyed to find that her fiancé, Reuben Butler, has been appointed Minister at the neighbouring kirk of Knocktarlitie. She subsequently marries Butler and raises three children named David, Reuben and Euphemia. Jeanie's sister, Effie, pays her a clandestine visit to inform her that she had married her lover who was now Sir George Staunton. Jeanie later learns that her sister's child had not been murdered but was sold to a Highland brigand and was reared to a life of robbery and violence. Sir George travels with Butler to visit Knocktarlitie but, caught by a storm, they arrive at a nearby smuggler's cove. He is shot by his own son, who escapes to America, gets into trouble, joins a tribe of Native Americans and is heard of no more. As Lady Staunton, Effie takes her place in London society but eventually retires to a French convent, much to her sister's disappointment at her relinquishing her father's religion.

== Origin ==
Sir Walter Scott wrote that he had learned the story from an unsigned, undated letter, whose writer had learned it in turn from a Mrs. Helen Lawson Goldie of Dumfries. The original of Jeanie Deans was Helen Walker, whose experience was more austere than the fiction Scott wrote. Helen Walker died in late 1791. Sir Walter Scott erected a monument at Helen Walker's grave in the parish of Irongray, about six miles from Dumfries.

== Jeanie Deans Cottage ==
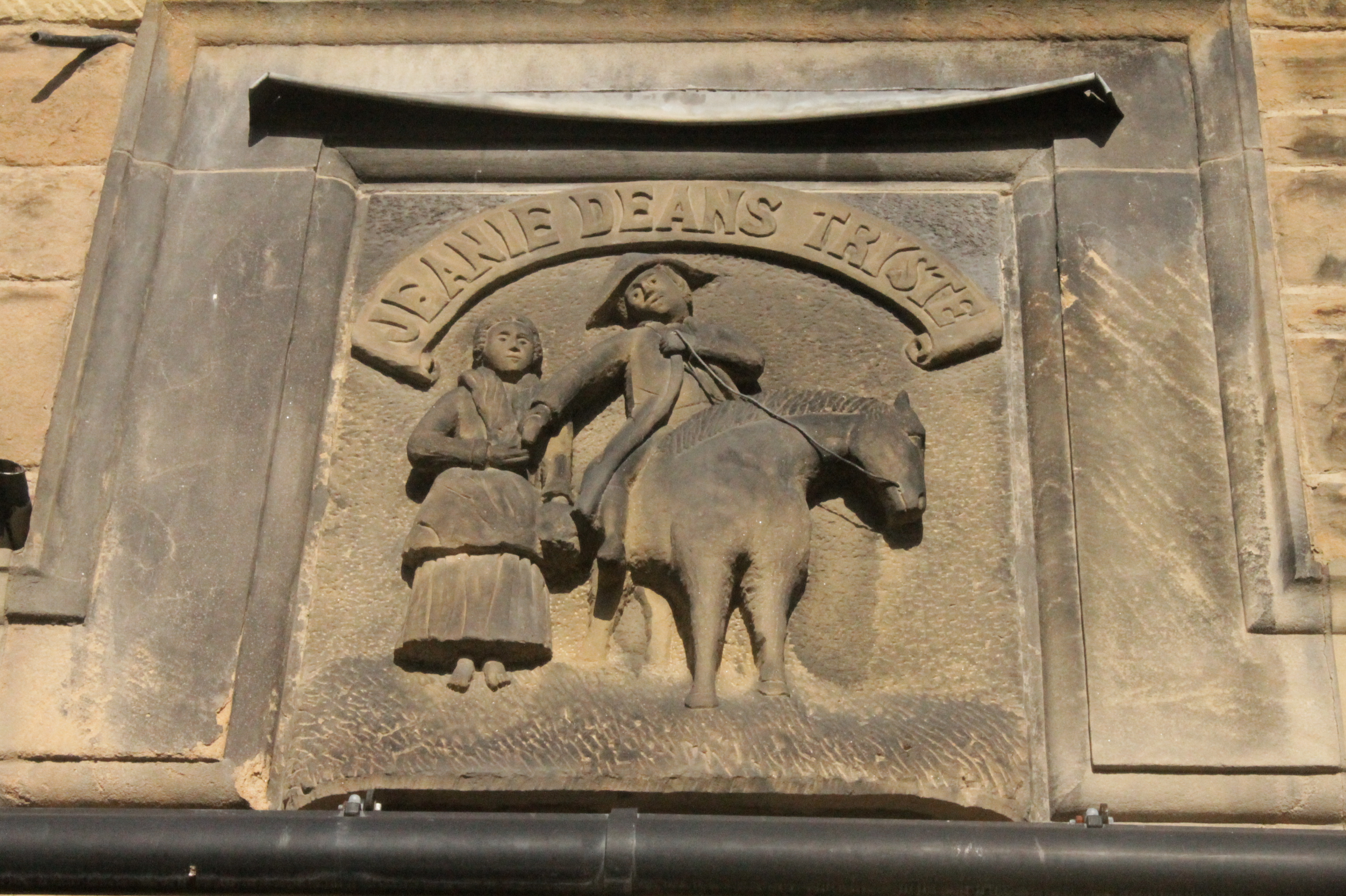
Plaque above Jeanie Deans Tryst pub, St Leonards, Edinburgh.

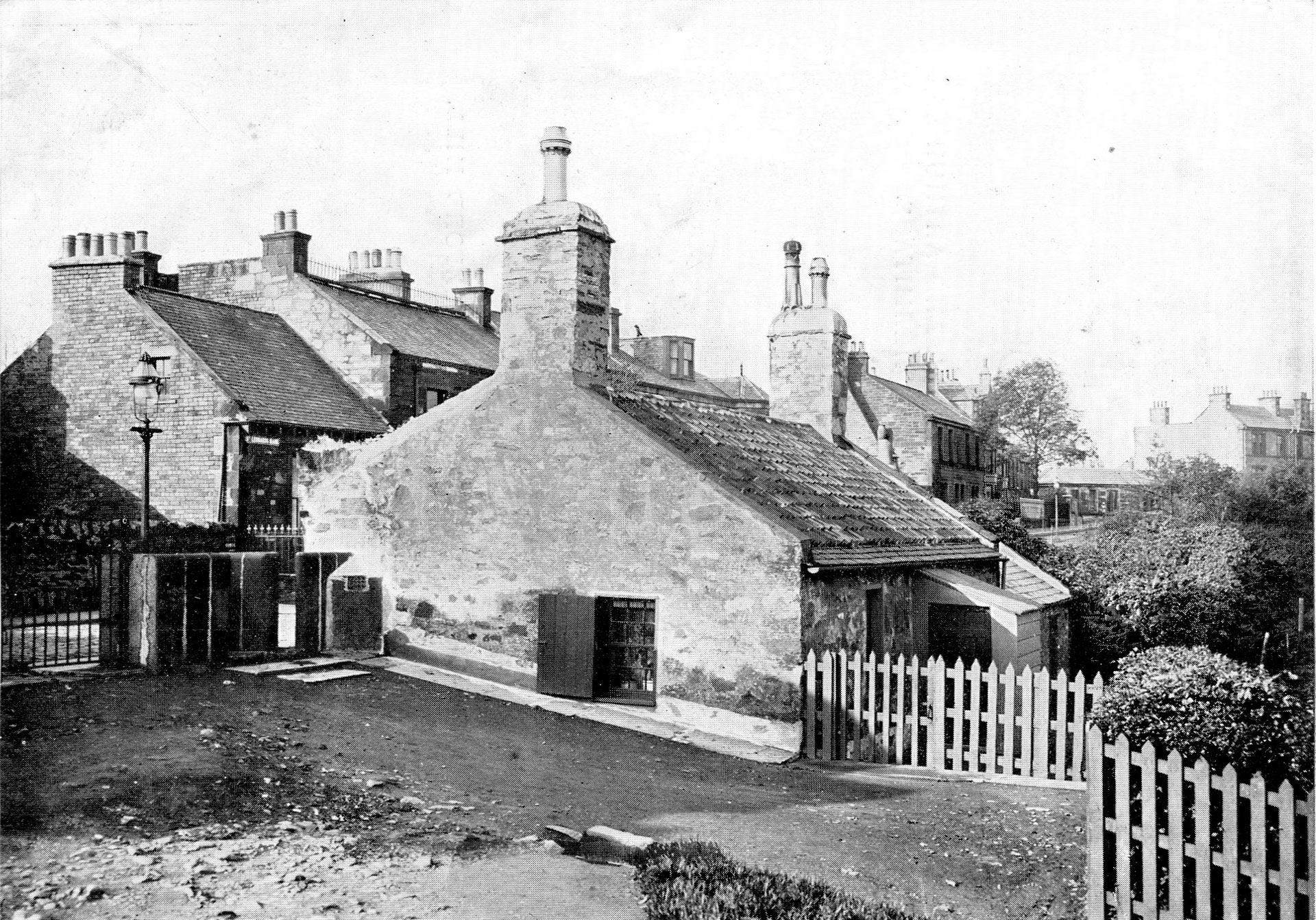
A 19th century photo of the cottage – all that remains today is part of the back wall

The so-called Jeanie Deans Cottage was situated at the southern end of St. Leonards Bank, Edinburgh. In the novel, Davie Deans was a dairy farmer (or cow-feeder) who moved to "a place called Saint Leonard's Crags, lying betwixt Edinburgh and the mountain called Arthur's Seat, and adjoining to the extensive sheep pasture still named the King's Park.... Here he rented a small lonely house, about half a mile distant from the nearest point of the city, but the site of which, with all the adjacent ground, is now occupied by the buildings which form the south-eastern suburb." St. Leonard's Crags itself is a few hundred metres to the north of the would-be Jeanie Deans Cottage and is now occupied by the building which was the James Clark School (now converted to flats). However, this cottage features in a map of Edinburgh as early as 1784. The same cottage is named as 'Herds house' in a map of 1823. The cottage was demolished in 1965.

== Scott Monument ==
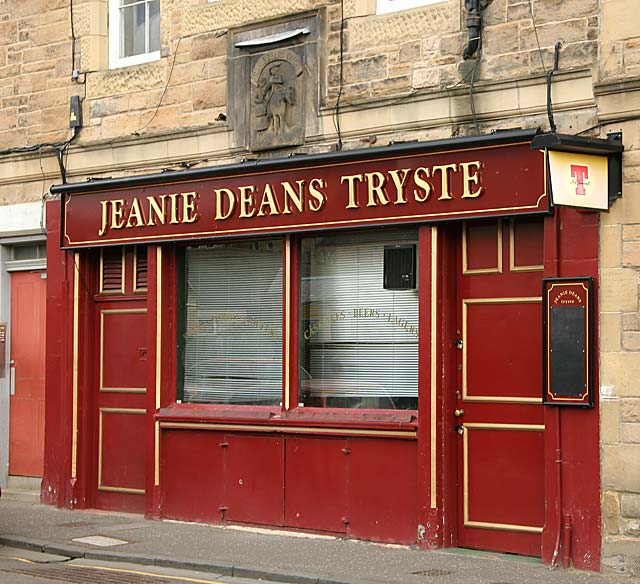
Jeanie Deans Tryste pub, Edinburgh.

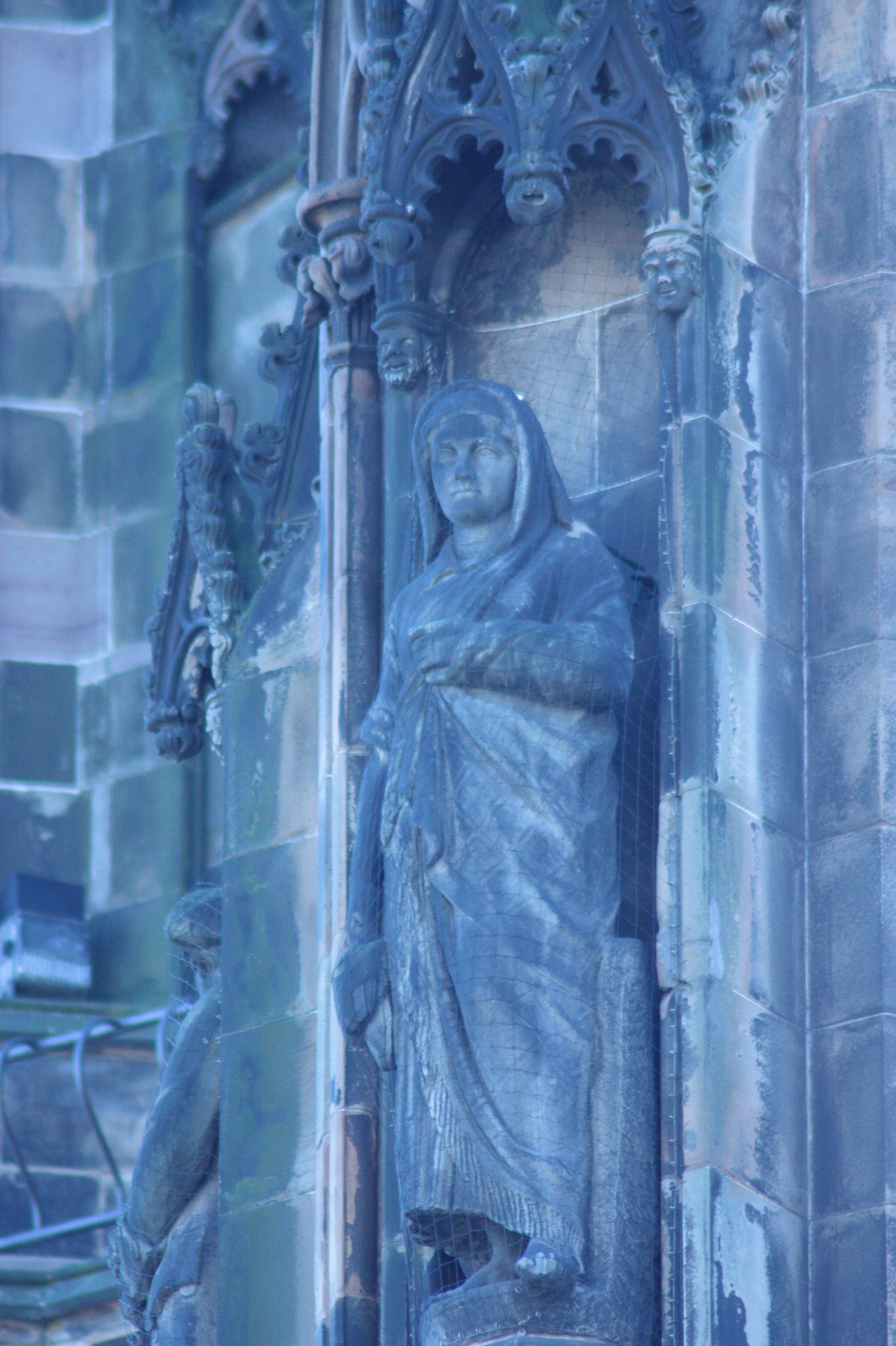
Scott Monument

A statue of Jeanie Deans is one of the principal sculptures on the Scott Monument on Princes Street in Edinburgh. It was sculpted by William Brodie and stands on the lower tier of the north-east buttress.

== Names ==
Several pubs in Scotland were named after Jeanie Deans, including Jeanie Deans Tryste in Edinburgh, and three in Glasgow.

A number of ships have been named Jeanie Deans. Two Clyde steamers, PS Jeanie Deans (1884), built by Barclay Curle & Co in 1884 for the North British Steam Packet Co, and PS Jeanie Deans (1931), built for the London and North Eastern Railway in 1931. Two sailing ships, Jeanie Deans, a four-masted sailing ship, recorded in 1843 as having sailed from Port Glasgow to Toronto, Ontario, Canada; and Jeannie Deans, a 49.3 ft wooden schooner, built in New South Wales, Australia in 1850 and registered in Sydney in 1851. The paddle steamer Waverley has a Jeanie Deans Lounge.

For railway locomotives named Jeanie Deans, on the London and North Western and North British Railways, see Jeanie Deans (railway locomotives).

The Jeanie Deans potato, resembling the old Lothian Flake, was advertised as a seed potato in a New Zealand newspaper in 1895 as being awarded "First at Invercargill Show for Best White Potato, any variety"

The Scottish composer Hamish MacCunn based his 1894 opera Jeanie Deans on Scott's novel.
