= List of British films of 1942 =

A list of British films released in 1942.

== 1942 ==
Title	Director	Cast	Genre	Notes
1942
Alibi	Brian Desmond Hurst	James Mason, Margaret Lockwood, Raymond Lovell	Thriller	
Asking for Trouble	Oswald Mitchell	Max Miller, Carole Lynne, Wilfrid Hyde-White	Comedy	
Back-Room Boy	Herbert Mason	Arthur Askey, Moore Marriott, Graham Moffatt	Comedy	
The Balloon Goes Up	Redd Davis	Ethel Revnell, Gracie West, Ronald Shiner	Comedy	
Banana Ridge	Walter C. Mycroft	Robertson Hare, Alfred Drayton, Nova Pilbeam	Comedy	
The Big Blockade	Charles Frend	Leslie Banks, John Mills, Michael Redgrave	War drama	
The Black Sheep of Whitehall	Basil Dearden	Will Hay, John Mills, Basil Sydney	Comedy	
Bob's Your Uncle	Oswald Mitchell	Albert Modley, Jean Colin, Wally Patch	Comedy	
Breach of Promise	Harold Huth	Clive Brook, Judy Campbell, Marguerite Allan	Comedy	
Coastal Command	J. B. Holmes	Roger Hunter, Charles Norman Lewis	Documentary	
The Day Will Dawn	Harold French	Hugh Williams, Griffiths Jones, Deborah Kerr	War	
The First of the Few	Leslie Howard	Leslie Howard, David Niven	War	
Flying Fortress	Walter Forde	Richard Greene, Carla Lehmann, Betty Stockfeld	War	
The Foreman Went to France	Charles Frend	Clifford Evans, Tommy Trinder, Constance Cummings	War	
Front Line Kids	Maclean Rogers	Leslie Fuller, Anthony Holles	Comedy	
Gert and Daisy Clean Up	Maclean Rogers	Elsie Waters, Doris Waters	Comedy	
Gert and Daisy's Weekend	Maclean Rogers	Elsie Waters, Doris Waters	Comedy	
Go to Blazes	Walter Forde	Will Hay, Thora Hird	Comedy	Short film
The Goose Steps Out	Basil Dearden	Will Hay, Frank Pettingell	Comedy	
The Great Mr. Handel	Norman Walker	Wilfrid Lawson, Elizabeth Allan	Biopic	
Hard Steel	Norman Walker	Wilfrid Lawson, Betty Stockfeld	Drama	
Hatter's Castle	Lance Comfort	Robert Newton, Deborah Kerr, James Mason	Drama	
In Which We Serve	David Lean	Noël Coward, John Mills, Bernard Miles	World War II	Number 92 in the list of BFI Top 100 British films
King Arthur Was a Gentleman	Marcel Varnel	Arthur Askey, Evelyn Dall	Comedy	
Lady from Lisbon	Leslie S. Hiscott	Francis L. Sullivan, Jane Carr	Comedy	
Let the People Sing	John Baxter	Alastair Sim, Fred Emney	Comedy	
Listen to Britain	Humphrey Jennings	Chesney Allen, Bud Flanagan	Propaganda short	
The Missing Million	Philip Brandon	Linden Travers, John Warwick	Crime	
Much Too Shy	Marcel Varnel	George Formby, Kathleen Harrison	Comedy	
The Next of Kin	Thorold Dickinson	Mervyn Johns, John Chandos	War drama	
The Night Has Eyes	Leslie Arliss	James Mason, Wilfrid Lawson, Joyce Howard	Thriller	
One of Our Aircraft Is Missing	Michael Powell, Emeric Pressburger	Godfrey Tearle, Eric Portman, Googie Withers	War	
The Peterville Diamond	Walter Forde	Anne Crawford, Donald Stewart, Renée Houston	Comedy crime	
Rose of Tralee	Germain Burger	John Longden, Lesley Brook, Angela Glynne	Musical	
Sabotage at Sea	Leslie S. Hiscott	David Hutcheson, Margaretta Scott, Jane Carr	War	
Salute John Citizen	Maurice Elvey	Edward Rigby, Mabel Constanduros, Jimmy Hanley	Drama	
Secret Mission	Harold French	James Mason, Hugh Williams, Carla Lehmann	War thriller	
Somewhere in Camp	John E. Blakeley	Frank Randle, Dan Young, Harry Korris	Comedy	
Suspected Person	Lawrence Huntington	Clifford Evans, Patricia Roc, David Farrar	Thriller	
Talk About Jacqueline	Harold French, Paul L. Stein	Hugh Williams, Carla Lehmann, Joyce Howard	Comedy	
They Flew Alone	Herbert Wilcox	Anna Neagle, Robert Newton, Edward Chapman	Biopic	
This Was Paris	John Harlow	Ann Dvorak, Ben Lyon, Griffith Jones	War	
Those Kids from Town	Lance Comfort	George Cole, Harry Fowler, Jeanne de Casalis	Comedy drama	
Thunder Rock	Roy Boulting	Michael Redgrave, Lilli Palmer, James Mason	Drama	
Uncensored	Anthony Asquith	Eric Portman, Phyllis Calvert, Griffith Jones	War drama	
Unpublished Story	Harold French	Richard Greene, Valerie Hobson, Basil Radford	War thriller	
We'll Smile Again	John Baxter	Bud Flanagan, Chesney Allen, Phyllis Stanley	Comedy	
Went the Day Well?	Alberto Cavalcanti	Leslie Banks, Mervyn Johns, Basil Sydney	War drama	
The Young Mr. Pitt	Carol Reed	Robert Donat, Phyllis Calvert, Robert Morley	History	

== See also ==
- 1942 in British music
- 1942 in British television
- 1942 in the United Kingdom
