= 1942 in British radio =

This is a list of events from British radio in 1942.

== Events ==
=== January ===
- 29 January – The BBC Forces Programme transmits the first edition of Desert Island Discs, devised and presented by Roy Plomley. Austrian-born revue artist (and son-in-law to the Prime Minister) Vic Oliver is the first castaway. The series will still be running (on BBC Radio 4) more than 75 years later.

=== February ===
- 27 February – James Stanley Hey, a British Army research officer, helps develop radio astronomy, when he discovers that the sun emits radio waves.

=== March ===
- No events.

=== April ===
- No events.

=== May ===
- 6 May – The Radio Doctor (Charles Hill) makes his first BBC radio broadcast giving avuncular health care advice to British civilians within the Kitchen Front programme; his broadcasts continue to 1950.
- 19 May – A subsequently famous BBC outside broadcast recording captures the song of the common nightingale with the sound of Royal Air Force Lancaster bombers flying overhead.

=== June ===
- 27 June – The BBC resumes sponsorship of the Promenade Concerts in London.
- 29 June – Shostakovich's Leningrad Symphony No. 7, the score of which has been smuggled out of the Soviet Union on microfilm, receives its first performance in Western Europe at The Proms, as an act of defiance following Germany's invasion of Russia.

=== July ===
- No events.

=== August ===
- No events.

=== September ===
- September – The Brains Trust first broadcast under this title on BBC Home Service radio in the United Kingdom.

=== October ===
- 7 October – The BBC Overseas Service begins Russian programming.

=== November ===
- 8 November – Aspidistra medium wave radio transmitter goes into service in the south of England for black propaganda and military deception purposes against Nazi Germany.

=== December ===
- No events.

=== Undated ===
- The BBC Dance Music Policy Committee adopts "a policy of excluding sickly sentimentality".
- Special Operations Executive devise the B Mk II radio receiver/transmitter set for dropping to resistance groups in occupied Europe.

== Debuts ==
- 29 January – Desert Island Discs (1942–Present)

== Continuing radio programmes ==
=== 1930s ===
- In Town Tonight (1933–1960)

=== 1940s ===
- Music While You Work (1940–1967)
- Sunday Half Hour (1940–2018)

== Births ==
- 20 February – Charlie Gillett, music presenter (died 2010)
- 30 May – Carole Stone, radio producer
- 18 July – Dave Cash, DJ (died 2016)
- 12 August – David Munrow, early music performer and presenter (Pied Piper on BBC Radio 3) (suicide 1976)
- 24 October – Frank Delaney, Irish-born novelist and radio presenter (died 2017)
- 24 December – Anthony Clare, Irish-born psychiatrist and radio presenter (died 2007)
- 26 December – Emperor Rosko (Mike Pasternak), American-born DJ

== See also ==
- 1942 in British music
- 1942 in British television
- 1942 in the United Kingdom
- List of British films of 1942
