= 1942 in British music =

This is a summary of 1942 in music in the United Kingdom.

== Events ==
- January/February – Serge Koussevitzky commissions Benjamin Britten to compose an opera, Peter Grimes, one of the first commissions given by the Koussevitzky Music Foundation.
- 16 March – Britten sails back to England with Peter Pears on board MS Axel Johnson.
- 20 March – Vera Lynn records The White Cliffs of Dover with Mantovani at Decca Records's West Hampstead studio.
- 29 June – Shostakovich’s Leningrad Symphony No. 7, the score of which has been smuggled out of the Soviet Union on microfilm, receives its first performance in Western Europe at the Proms in London, as an act of defiance following Germany's invasion of Russia.
- 26 August – In an act of wartime cultural diplomacy, John Ireland, Granville Bantock, Arnold Bax and Benjamin Britten deliver a letter to the wife of the Soviet Ambassador sending greetings from British composers to their Soviet counterparts.
- November/December – E.J. Moeran's Symphony is the first British work to be recorded under the auspices of the British Council. The recording is made in Manchester by the Hallé Orchestra conducted by Leslie Heward.

== Popular music ==
- Vera Lynn with Mantovani – The White Cliffs of Dover (Walter Kent)

== Classical music: new works ==
- Kenneth J. Alford – Eagle Squadron
- Benjamin Britten –
  - A Ceremony of Carols
  - Hymn to St Cecilia
- Gerald Finzi – Let Us Garlands Bring Op. 18, song cycle (words by Shakespeare)

== Film and Incidental music ==
- Noël Coward – In Which We Serve
- Ralph Vaughan Williams –
  - Coastal Command (film)
  - The Pilgrim’s Progress (music for radio production)
- William Walton – The First of the Few directed by and starring Leslie Howard, with co-star David Niven.

== Musical theatre ==
- 22 October – Du Barry Was A Lady, London production opens at His Majesty's Theatre and runs for 178 performances
- 19 November – Let's Face It!, London production opens at the Hippodrome and runs for 348 performances

== Musical films ==
- Rose of Tralee, starring John Longden, Lesley Brook and Angela Glynne.
- We'll Smile Again, starring Bud Flanagan, Chesney Allen and Meinhart Maur.

== Births ==
- 2 February – Graham Nash, English-born rock singer-songwriter and photographer
- 12 February – Lionel Grigson, English pianist, composer and educator (died 1994)
- 15 February – Glyn Johns, recording engineer
- 19 February – Phil Coulter, musician and music producer
- 24 February – Tim Staffell, singer and guitarist
- 28 February – Brian Jones, rock musician (The Rolling Stones) (died 1969)
- 9 March – John Cale, composer and musician
- 13 March – Meic Stevens, singer-songwriter
- 24 March – Arthur Brown, singer (Kingdom Come and The Crazy World of Arthur Brown)
- 19 April – David Fanshawe, composer (died 2010)
- 12 May – Ian Dury, singer-songwriter (died 2000)
- 18 June – Paul McCartney, singer, songwriter & composer
- 17 July – Spencer Davis, musician
- 13 August – Sheila Armstrong, soprano
- 21 September – Jill Gomez, soprano
- 27 September – Alvin Stardust (born Bernard Jewry, also called Shane Fenton), pop singer (died 2014)
- 31 December – Andy Summers, rock musician (Police)

== Deaths ==
- 14 January – Harry Champion, music hall composer, 76
- 10 February – Felix Powell, musician, 63
- 17 May – Alfred Hollins, organist and composer, 76
- 12 June – Walter Leigh, composer, 36 (killed in action)
- 16 June – Haldane Stewart, organist, composer and choirmaster, 74
- 17 June – Jessie Bond, singer and actress in Gilbert & Sullivan, 89
- 30 July – Dorothy Silk, soprano, 59
- 15 October – Dame Marie Tempest, opera and musical comedy singer, 78
- 23 November – Peadar Kearney, Irish Republican and songwriter, writer of the lyrics to The Soldier's Song, 58

== See also ==
- 1942 in British television
- 1942 in the United Kingdom
- List of British films of 1942
