= Leonard Sharp (actor) =

English actor (1890–1958)

Leonard Sharp (24 May 1890 – 24 October 1958) was an English actor. He was married to the actress Nora Gordon. Their daughter is the actress Dorothy Gordon. He was sometimes credited as Len Sharp.

He starred in the 1946 BBC television series Pinwright's Progress as the messenger "boy" Ralph, who is a deaf octogenarian. The series is recognised as the first real example of the half-hour situation comedy on British television.

== Selected filmography ==
in Murder at 3am (1953)

- Boys Will Be Boys (1935) - Whitey (uncredited)
- Rembrandt (1936) - Burgher at Auction (uncredited)
- Windbag the Sailor (1936) - Crew Member (uncredited)
- Feather Your Nest (1937) - Mr. Peabody (uncredited)
- It's Never Too Late to Mend (1937) - Prisoner Bradshaw (uncredited)
- Owd Bob (1938) - Bookmakers Assistant (uncredited)
- Bank Holiday (1938) - Jack - Petrol Pump Attendant (uncredited)
- Convict 99 (1938) - Convict (uncredited)
- They Drive by Night (1938) - Card Player at Billiard Hall (uncredited)
- Sexton Blake and the Hooded Terror (1938) - (uncredited)
- Charley's (Big-Hearted) Aunt (1940) - Buller's Assistant (uncredited)
- Neutral Port (1940) - (uncredited)
- Gasbags (1941) - Chip Shop Customer (uncredited)
- Love on the Dole (1941) - Man at Demonstration (uncredited)
- The Man at the Gate (1941) - Man Who Brings Message To Church (uncredited)
- Sheepdog of the Hills (1942) - Geordie Scott
- Gert and Daisy's Weekend (1942) - Small Boys Father (uncredited)
- Hard Steel (1942) - Baker
- The Great Mr. Handel (1942)
- Death by Design (1943) - Bob Joyce
- It's That Man Again (1943) - Claude
- Variety Jubilee (1943) - Newspaper Seller (uncredited)
- Warn That Man (1943) - Miles (uncredited)
- Dear Octopus (1943) - (uncredited)
- The Dummy Talks (1943) - (uncredited)
- They Met in the Dark (1943) - Bus Conductor (uncredited)
- Love Story (1944) - Trapped Miner (uncredited)
- Waterloo Road (1945) - Man Who Brings Policeman (uncredited)
- The Hangman Waits (1947)
- Dual Alibi (1947)
- Anna Karenina (1948) - Old Man (uncredited)
- For Them That Trespass (1949) - Pub Customer (uncredited)
- Man on the Run (1949) - Tom (uncredited)
- Trottie True (1949) - Carter (uncredited)
- The Girl Who Couldn't Quite (1950) - Joe (uncredited)
- The Girl Is Mine (1950) - Watchman
- Night and the City (1950) - Beggar (uncredited)
- Chance of a Lifetime (1950) - Mitch
- Seven Days to Noon (1950) - Fred - Barman (uncredited)
- The Mudlark (1950) - Ben Fox (uncredited)
- Madame Louise (1951) - Man at Races (uncredited)
- Take Me to Paris (1951) - Walter
- Sing Along with Me (1952)
- King of the Underworld (1952) - Mullins
- The Stolen Plans (1952) - Tod
- Three Steps to the Gallows (1953) - Clerk - Somerset House (uncredited)
- Murder at 3am (1953) - Old Skip
- The Fake (1953) - Tate Gallery Attendant (uncredited)
- The Intruder (1953) - Glazier (uncredited)
- Adventure in the Hopfields (1954) - China Mender
- The Million Pound Note (1954) - Cabbie (uncredited)
- For Better, for Worse (1954) - 1st Workman
- Radio Cab Murder (1954) - Charlie (First Watchman) (uncredited)
- The Ladykillers (1955) - Pavement Artist (uncredited)
- Alias John Preston (1955) - (uncredited)
- Satellite in the Sky (1956) - Thomas - Watchman (uncredited)
- The Silken Affair (1956) - Elevator Operator
- At the Stroke of Nine (1957) - News Vendor
- Night of the Demon (1957) - Ticket Collector (uncredited)
- The Haunted Strangler (1958) - George - Judas Hole Waiter (uncredited)
- Three Crooked Men (1958) - Joe (uncredited)
