= Servants All =

1936 short film

- Eve Lister and Ian Colin in the film
- Directed by: Alex Bryce
- Screenplay by: E. Lewis Waller
- Starring: Robb Wilton; Eve Lister; Ian Colin
- Production company: Fox-British Pictures
- Release date: 1936
- Running time: 34 minutes
- Country: United Kingdom
- Language: English

Sevants All is a 1936 British short comedy film directed by Alex Bryce and starring Robb Wilton, Eve Lister and Cyril Cusack. It was written by E. Lewis Waller. Servants switch places with the aristocrats they work for.

== Preservation status ==
The British Film Institute National Archive holds a collection of stills but no film or video materials.

== Plot ==
Watkins, butler to Sir Phineas and Lady Grant, is duped by a con-man into thinking he has made a small fortune. When the Grants lose all their money, they convert their house into a hotel. Watkins and his family become their guests.

== Cast ==
- Robb Wilton as Watkins
- Eve Lister as Priscilla
- Ian Colin as Gale
- Viola Compton as Lady Agatha Grant
- Arthur Young as Sir Phineas Grant
- Edie Martin as Mrs. Watkins
- Cyril Cusack as Billy
- Francesca Bahrle as Gloria
- Alan D'Egville as Mr. Horton-Pratt

== Reception ==
Kine Weekly wrote: "Feeble sociological comedy crudely adapted from a music-hall sketch. The humour is far too old-fashioned to withstand amplification to full quota dimensions, and the net result is a film beneath the notice of the average exhibitor. Definitely not recommended. ... Robb Wilton strives hard to amuse as Watkins but the feeble part and the atrocious dialogue beat him hands down. ... the idea is exploited with such a clumsy, amateurish hand that what laughs there are are scored at the expense of the picture's crudity. ...The staging is so cramped that the attempt to create humorous contrast between life above and below stairs completely misfires while the camera work is static."

The Daily Film Renter wrote: "Directed with little inspiration, the piece is decked cut with banal dialogue, ludicrous situations, and artificial characterisation, while the acting hardly reaches any new high levels. What entertainment there is derives from the spectacle of erstwhile servants lording it over their late employers, who are forced to wait on them. There is a slight romantic element, but this, in common with most of the other issues, is ambiguously defined. Robb Wilton tries hard to infuse life-blood into his role of a butler, but with little effect."

Picture Show wrote: "There is little to recommend this weak story of penurious aristocrats whose places are taken by their servants in their own home. Indifferently directed and acted."

Picturegoer wrote: "Outmoded humour, dull dialogue and crude handling make it impossible for the cast to get any worth-while entertainment out of this story."
