= Haver and Lee =

British comedy duo (late 1920s – early 1940s)

Signed publicity photo, c.1940 - Haver (Clay Keyes) on right

Haver and Lee were a British comedy duo who were active between the late 1920s and early 1940s. Haver was Clay Keyes (born Henry James Newbold; 9 December 1892 – 19 June 1970). Lee was Frank Tully (born Frank Mendoza Jr.; 14 December 1888 – 19 January 1962). Both also had separate careers – Keyes with his wife Gladys, and as a solo comedian and broadcaster, and Tully as a dancer with his sister Vesta.

== Background ==
Keyes and Tully both came from theatrical families, and met and decided to work together as children.

Tully was born in Antwerp, Belgium, and was a member of the Boisset troupe of acrobats and comedians, known internationally for their comedy and pantomime skills. Most of the troupe, including Tully's parents, were members of the Mendoza family; Tully was his mother's maiden name. In about 1912, he formed a music hall act with his much younger sister Vesta, as "eccentric" or "American" dancers, performing to ragtime music. The following year they performed at Knowsley Hall near Liverpool in a private command performance for King George V and Queen Mary, with other performers including George Formby Sr. and David Devant, one year after the first public Royal Command Performance. Frank and Vesta continued to perform together until the 1920s, sometimes billing themselves as "the Royal Dancers".

Keyes was born in Liverpool, also into a family of performers who travelled internationally. His father and grandfather, both named Henry Newbold, both worked as music hall comedians, dancers, and as slackwire walkers, and both used the name Henri Balleni. The elder Balleni, Keyes' grandfather, crossed Niagara Falls on a tightrope in 1873, and jumped into the river below with his fall broken by a rubber cord.

Tully made his first BBC radio broadcasts in 1924. Keyes also appeared in his own right as a comic juggler of Indian clubs, sometimes billed as "The Ace of Clubs", appearing on the bill at the Alhambra music hall in London in September 1924.

== Haver and Lee ==
Keyes and Tully formed the comedy double act Haver and Lee in the mid-1920s. Haver (Keyes) was the straight man, with a marked American accent, who attempted to recite or sing while Lee (Tully) would interrupt with nonsensical comments and wisecracks.

=== Filmography ===
- Radio Parade of 1935 (1934)
- The Student's Romance (1935)
- Mother, Don't Rush Me (1936)
- Once in a Million (1936)
- The Scat Burglars (1936)
- several short films for British Pathé (1940)

=== Radio ===
They appeared in BBC radio broadcasts from 1931, billed as "The Fun Racketeers", and later made regular appearances on Henry Hall's Guest Night, closing their spot with the catchphrase, "Play, Henry!".

From 1940, they played the roles of Duckweed and Eggblow, two useless handymen in a hotel, in the anarchic radio comedy series Danger - Men at Work!, written and produced by Max Kester. They made their final radio broadcast together in the show Happidrome, in 1944.

== Clay and Gladys Keyes ==
Keyes also worked with his wife Gladys (née Massey; 1890–1974). They wrote the radio show Charing Cross Road, a "play with music" about the lives of theatrical professionals in London, first broadcast in 1934. It also featured Tully and other performers including Charles Hawtrey, and was filmed two years later, starring John Mills and June Clyde. Clay and Gladys Keyes also wrote Rogues and Rhythm, broadcast in 1936.

In 1941, Gladys and Clay Keyes devised and scripted the radio variety show The Old Town Hall, a popular weekly series hosted by Clay Keyes and featuring his wife in various character roles. The show also starred Richard Goolden, and featured "Can You Beat the Band?", a slot in which listeners sent in joke questions, the answers to which were the titles of popular songs. If the band failed to guess the correct answer, there was a call of "Pennies on the drum!", and participants donated money to the "Spitfire Fund", a military charity. The show continued until 1947.

After the end of the Second World War, Keyes reprised his role as Duckweed in Danger - Men at Work!, but without Tully. In 1949, Keyes appeared in another show, Clay's College, also co-written with Gladys Keyes. His final radio appearances were in the mid-1950s as the host of Midday Music Hall.

== Deaths ==
Tully retired after the end of the war, and died in Croydon in 1962, aged 73. Clay Keyes died in Saltdean, Sussex, in 1970, aged 77.
