= Little Ladyship =

1939 play

- Written by: Ian Hay
- Original language: English
- Genre: Comedy

Premiere
- Date premiered: 16 January 1939
- Place premiered: King's Theatre, Glasgow

Little Ladyship is a 1939 comedy play by the British writer Ian Hay.

It premiered at the King's Theatre, Glasgow before beginning its West End run at the Strand Theatre and later transferring to the Aldwych Theatre. The original West End run lasted for 126 performances. The cast included Cecil Parker, Lilli Palmer, David Tree, Joan Greenwood, Aubrey Mather, Norma Varden, Diana King and Iris Vandeleur.

In March 1939, the BBC broadcast a recorded version of the play on television.

== Bibliography ==
- Wearing, J.P. The London Stage 1930-1939: A Calendar of Productions, Performers, and Personnel. Rowman & Littlefield, 2014.
