= Hyde Park (1934 film) =

1934 British film by Randall Faye

- Feature on the film in Picturegoer (13 October 1934)
- Directed by: Randall Faye
- Written by: Randall Faye
- Produced by: Irving Asher
- Starring: George Carney; Barry Clifton; Eve Lister
- Cinematography: Basil Emmott
- Production company: Warner Brothers-First National Productions
- Distributed by: Warner Brothers
- Release date: 1 November 1934
- Country: United Kingdom
- Language: English

Hyde Park is a 1934 British comedy film directed and written by Randall Faye and starring George Carney, Barry Clifton and Eve Lister. The film was shot at Teddington Studios in London as a quota quickie by the British subsidiary of Warner Brothers. It follows a socialist who refuses to give permission for his daughter to marry an aristocrat, but changes his mind when he himself comes into money.

== Preservation status ==
The British Film Institute National Archive holds a collection of stills but no film or video materials.

== Plot ==
Joe Smith, a soapbox orator in Hyde Park, spends his Sunday mornings passionately railing against the capitalist system. His daughter Mary is knocked down by a car driven by Bill Lenbridge, the son of Lord Lenbridge. Mary and Bill subsequently fall in love, but Joe refuses to allow his daughter marry into a capitalist family. Bill takes advantage of his father's generosity and devises a plan: he gives Joe a gift of £1,000, saying it is an unexpected inheritance from a deceased aunt. This sudden windfall prompts a radical transformation in Joe's political ideology. No longer a fierce opponent of wealth, he happily drops his objections to Mary and Bill’s marriage.

== Cast ==
- George Carney as Joe Smith
- Barry Clifton as Bill Lenbridge
- Eve Lister as Mary Smith
- Wallace Lupino as Alf Turner
- Charles Carlson as Lord Lenbridge
- Phyllis Morris as Mrs Smith
- Charles Hawtrey

== Reception ==
Kine Weekly wrote: "Artless romantic comedy, which aims its simple shafts of wit at the insincerity of the Socialist. The film is too naive to be political; it won't cause any discussion. The best it can hope to do is to provide second-feature quota entertainment for the uncritical masses. Two factors are in the film's favour, the characterisation is not too bad, and the length is accommodating."

The Daily Film Renter wrote: "Unimaginative direction fails to secure conviction for crude narrative, while dialogue and situations are trite to a degree. Eve Lister gives charming performance as heroine, despite fact she is far too polished to appear realistic as daughter of plebian parents. Interesting Hyde Park exteriors form main locale. For the uncritical only."

Picturegoer wrote: "A naive and artless production which attempts to be witty at the expense of the alleged insincerity of Socialists during the course of a romance between the daughter of a soap-box orator and the son of a noble lord."

Picture Show wrote: "A romantic comedy with a 'political' plot. George Carney as Joe Smith the Socialist is not very convincing. Charles Carson as the peer is quite good. Eve Lister as Mary plays the part reasonably well and is adequately supported by Barry Clifton. The shots of Hyde Park are the best part of the picture."
