= Shayle Gardner =

New Zealand actor (1890–1945)

Shayle Gardner (22 August 1890 – 17 May 1945) was a New Zealand actor.

== Partial filmography ==
- The Indian Love Lyrics (1923)
- St. Elmo (1923)
- The Chinese Bungalow (1926)
- Tommy Atkins (1928)
- Sailors Don't Care (1928)
- The Three Passions (1929)
- Three Live Ghosts (1929)
- Disraeli (1929)
- The Alley Cat (1929)
- The Return of Dr. Fu Manchu (1930)
- Detective Lloyd (1931), a serial
- Diamond Cut Diamond (1932)
- The Lodger (1932)
- Menace (1934)
- The Love Test (1935)
- Wolf's Clothing (1936)
- The Scat Burglars (1936)
- The Brown Wallet (1936)
