= Men of Yesterday =

1936 film directed by John Baxter

- Eve Lister and Stewart Rome in the film
- Directed by: John Baxter
- Written by: Gerald Elliott; Jack Francis
- Produced by: John Baxter
- Starring: Stewart Rome; Sam Livesey; Hay Petrie; Cecil Parker
- Cinematography: Jack Parker
- Edited by: Sidney Stone
- Music by: Kennedy Russell
- Production company: United Kingdom Films
- Distributed by: Associated Producers & Distributors
- Release date: May 1936
- Running time: 82 minutes
- Country: United Kingdom
- Language: English

Men of Yesterday is a 1936 British drama film directed by John Baxter and starring Stewart Rome, Sam Livesey and Hay Petrie. It was written by Gerald Elliott and Jack Francis and was made at Shepperton Studios with sets designed by John Bryan. An ex-army Major organises an international reunion party to promote world peace.

== Synopsis ==
After being forced to resign from his long-standing position as director of the Steel Plate Company for being "too old," Major Radford is encouraged by his former military comrades to pursue his vision of promoting world peace. The Major invites both French and German veterans to his old regiment’s annual reunion dinner. The story culminates in former allies and enemies setting aside their past conflicts, shaking hands and declaring their opposition to future wars.

== Cast ==
- Stewart Rome as Major Radford
- Sam Livesey
- Hay Petrie
- Eve Lister
- Cecil Parker
- Roddy Hughes
- Ian Colin
- George Robey
- Will Fyffe
- Ella Shields
- Dick Henderson
- Edgar Norfolk
- Dick Francis
- Edgar Driver
- Frederick Culley
- Freddie Watts
- Patric Curwen
- Stanley Kirby
- Vi Kaley
- Ernest Jay
- John Hepworth
- Henry Hepworth
- J. Neil More
- Gustave Ferrari
- Denis Hayden
- Terry Doyle
- Barbara Everest

== Reception ==
The Monthly Film Bulletin wrote: "The script of this film is a fine piece of writing that preserves its integrity even when inclined to be over-sentimental ... Baxter's direction, though stressing the emotional passages rather unnecessarily, shows a rare regard for authentic atmosphere and Stewart Rome gives a finely etched, if sentimental, performance as the Major. George Robey, Ella Shields, and Will Fyffe also appear, but it is on the scores of men appearing as, presumably, themselves that the film depends so successfully for its broad effects: for detail it depends on genuine people with genuine feelings."

Kine Weekly wrote: "Stirring musical patriotic melodrama, taking the form of a pictorial and vocal plea for international good fellowship. ... Stewart Rome is very good as Major Radford, he has character and humanity, and is a fine prop for the slight story and its wealth of war and post war trimmings."

The Daily Film Renter wrote: "Told partly in flashback, bringing in gripping scenes of front line, with typical Concert Party, introducing George Robey, Ella Shields, and Dick Henderson. Strong patriotic theme, and effective climax in which ex-soldiers from France and Germany plead for peace. Frequent touches of cockney humour, and strong emotional values. ... Acting generally is quite competent, and most of the work naturally falls upon Stewart Rome, who plays Major Radford both in the army sequences, and later, when he realises he is too old for a place in the modern scheme of things, he is convincing, although at times he is a little stagy."

Picturegoer wrote: "Its sentiment is rather too heavily underlined and it is not free from theatricality, but, since it is sincere in its object, it is certainly worthy of your support. ... John Baxter has directed quite well and has staged his reconstructed war scenes vividly, while the concert behind the lines, which is introduced by the reminiscences of an ex-sergeant, will bring back memories to many of the older picture-goers."
