= Death by Design =

1943 British film by Germain Burger

- Directed by: Germain Burger
- Written by: Leonard Gribble
- Produced by: Craig Baynes
- Starring: John Longden; Wally Patch; Leonard Sharp; Barbara James; George Ellisia
- Cinematography: Geoffrey Faithfull
- Production company: Guild Films
- Release date: 1943
- Running time: 18 minutes
- Country: United Kingdom
- Language: English

Death by Design is a 1943 British mystery film directed by Germain Burger and starring John Longden, Wally Patch and Barbara James.

== Cast ==
- John Longden as Inspector Slade
- Wally Patch as Sergeant Clinton
- Leonard Sharp as Bob Joyce
- Barbara James as Betty Marston
- George Ellisia as Phil Gorman

== Bibliography ==
- Low, Rachael. Filmmaking in 1930s Britain. George Allen & Unwin, 1985.
- Wood, Linda. British Films, 1927-1939. British Film Institute, 1986.
