= Danger – Men at Work! =

British radio comedy (1939-47)

- Genre: Comedy
- Country of origin: United Kingdom
- Language: English
- Home station: BBC Home Service
- Starring: Doris Nichols; Jacques Brown; Clay Keyes; Frank Tully etc.
- Written by: Max Kester
- Original release: 11 May 1939 – 13 May 1947
- No. of episodes: 48

Danger – Men at Work! is a British radio comedy programme, broadcast by the BBC over seven series between 1939 and 1947.

The show was written and produced, at first, by Max Kester and Anthony Hall, with later series by Kester alone. It was the first British radio comedy in the "crazy" style of the Marx Brothers, and centred on the attempts of wealthy widowed hotel owner Mrs Ponsonby (played by Doris Nichols) to have work done by men who would invariably try to trick her out of her money. The workmen were played in the first series by American double act Van and Allen; in the second series by Jack Train and George Moon; and in later series by Haver and Lee (Clay Keyes and Frank Tully), as the characters Eggblow and Duckweed. A recurring character was Nikolas Ridikoulos, played by Jacques Brown.

The show was later described as "... relentlessly fast-paced (on one occasion a live transmission ended ten minutes early) ... surreal, innovative and inspired ... groundbreaking in its use of sound effects and insult comedy." After five series totalling 29 episodes in 1939–40, the show was revived for 1946–47, with Tully replaced by Charlie Irwin.
