= The Last Load =

1948 British film by John Baxter

- Opening titles
- Directed by: John Baxter
- Screenplay by: Mary Cathcart Borer; Geoffrey Orme
- Produced by: John Baxter
- Starring: Douglas Barr; Ivor Bowyer; Angela Glynne; Angela Foulds
- Cinematography: Jo Jago
- Production company: Elstree Independent Films
- Release date: 1948
- Running time: 54 minutes
- Country: United Kingdom
- Language: English

The Last Load is a 1948 British children's second feature ('B') film directed by John Baxter and starring Douglas Barr, Ivor Bowyer, Angela Glynne and Angela Foulds. It was written by Mary Cathcart Borer and Geoffrey Orme, and was an Elstree Independent Films production, sponsored by Gaumont-British Instructional and Children's Entertainment Films.

== Plot ==
Young David Eden and Susan Potter team up to help Susan's father, a lorry fleet owner, track down a criminal gang. The children uncover a scheme to hijack a valuable shipment that Mr. Potter is driving to the docks. David alerts his father, who contacts the police and together they ambush and capture the crooks. With the gang defeated, Mr. Potter takes the children along on a race to deliver the final load to the docks before it's too late.

== Cast ==
- Douglas Barr as David Eden
- Ivor Bowyer as Monty
- Angela Glynne as Susan Potter
- Angela Foulds as Betty Potter
- John Longden as Mr Potter
- Betty Hardy as Mrs Potter
- Ian Colin as Mr Eden
- Katherine Page as Mrs Eden
- Herbert Walton as Horrocks
- George Street as Blackwell
- Len Sharpe as Watson
- R. Sibley Grant as Annie

== Reception ==
The Monthly Film Bulletin wrote: "This is a well constructed story and the best film yet made in the series designed specially for children by G.B.I. Douglas Barr should be an interesting young man to watch: he has great presence and gives an intelligent performance as David. Some of the children are rather stiff and unnatural, but most of them enter into the spirit of the thing. The grown-ups form an unobtrusive background: it is the children who shape and develop the story. The whole forms an exciting film which will perch many grown-ups on the edge of their seats."

Kine Weekly wrote: "Exciting and jolly comedy melodrama set on the broad highway. Its exuberant tale of sabotage and high-jacking is designed principally for youngsters, but John Baxter the director, gets so much out of the child players and embroiders the rough stuff with so many diverting and disarming touches that it should appeal equally to grown ups. ... It's much more sensible and thrilling than the average 'B' picture."

Picturegoer wrote: "Juvenile type of melodrama with comedy, with an accent on the child artists ... does not amount to much so far as dramatic entertainment is concerned. It is the child interest – they drive the crooks to bay – which is the main interest."

In British Sound Films: The Studio Years 1928–1959 David Quinlan rated the film as "average", writing: "Rousing children's film."
