= Gert and Daisy (TV series) =

1959 British TV sitcom

Gert and Daisy is a 1959 British television sitcom. Starring the comedy act of the same name, the series aired on ITV, and was produced by Jack Hylton Productions for Associated-Rediffusion Television. The series aired for six episodes. Created by Ted Willis, who also created Jack Warner's Dixon of Dock Green series, Gert and Daisy was not successful, apparently because it relied on scripts written by others rather than on the sisters' own writing skills. All the episodes still exist but the series has yet to appear on home video.

== Premise ==
Gert and Daisy are two sisters who run a theatrical boarding house.

== Cast ==
- Elsie Waters as Gert
- Doris Waters as Daisy
- Hugh Paddick as Boris
- Patsy Rowlands as Bonnie
- Dudy Nimmo as Maureen
- Jennifer Browne as Lulu
- Julian D'Albie as Harry
- Rosemary Scott as Violet
- Keith Faulkner as Rod
