= Sheepdog of the Hills =

1941 film by Germain Burger

- Directed by: Germain Burger
- Produced by: Butcher's Film Service
- Starring: David Farrar; Philip Friend; Helen Perry
- Cinematography: Geoffrey Faithfull
- Edited by: A.C. Knott
- Release date: 22 December 1941
- Running time: 76 minutes
- Country: United Kingdom
- Language: English

Sheepdog of the Hills is a 1941 British second feature ('B') drama film directed by Germain Burger and starring David Farrar, Philip Friend and Helen Perry.

== Plot ==
West Country police constable Jason Scott is investigating an outbreak of sheep-stealing in the small rural village of Collington, and identifies the culprit as Riggy Teasdale, who has trained his dog Moss to round up groups of sheep, unsupervised. When Riggy is drowned, Moss comes to live with the vicar, Michael Verney. Verney and the newly arrived doctor, Peter Hammond, are both in love with nurse Frances Miller. Hammond eventually wins her hand and Varney marries them. Moss brings them a marriage gift of four sheep.

== Cast ==
- David Farrar as Rev. Michael Verney
- Philip Friend as Dr. Peter Hammond
- Helen Perry as Frances Miller
- Dennis Wyndham as Riggy Teasdale
- Leonard Sharp as Geordie Scott
- Jack Vyvian as Constable Scott
- Arthur Denton as Hawkins
- Philip Godfrey as Sam Worrow
- Johnnie Schofield as Tom Abbott

== Reception ==
The Monthly Film Bulletin wrote: "A peaceful film well-photographed in lovely country with, course, spotlight on Moss the sheep-dog. The rest of the acting is subdued to this star – too much so, for story has strong dramatic possibilities, but there is an excellent performance from Dennis Wyndham as Riggy Teasdale who 'never stole a sheep in his life'. "

Kine Weekly wrote: "The simple story is unhurried, but ingenuous as the play is in outline and tranquil as it is in environment it has no difficulty in covering its generous footage with refreshing, out-of-the-ordinary entertainment. Its secret is its good characterisation, clean sentiment, versatile approach to its engaging canine interest, sense of humour, picturesque scenery and shrewdly placed thrills."

Picturegoer wrote: "It has a good human touch, is well characterised and set in picturesque Devonshire surroundings. David Farrar gives a good performance as the vicar who is also in love with the secretary and goes temporarily blind. PhilipFfriend is sound as the doctor and Helen Perry makes an attractive heroine. As the local hermit who trained the dog and is killed trying to avoid arrest, Dennis Wyndham scores. Moss, a champion sheepdog, does all that is asked of him."

In British Sound Films: The Studio Years 1928–1959 David Quinlan rated the film as "average", writing: "Sentimental drama rather over-dominated by its doggy star."
