= The Small Man =

1936 film directed by John Baxter

- Ian Colin and Mary Newland in the film
- Directed by: John Baxter
- Written by: Con West
- Produced by: John Barter
- Starring: George Carney; Minnie Rayner; Lilian Oldland
- Cinematography: Desmond Dickinson
- Music by: Haydn Wood
- Production companies: Baxter and Barter Productions
- Distributed by: Universal Pictures
- Release date: 2 September 1936
- Running time: 71 minutes
- Country: United Kingdom
- Language: English

The Small Man is a 1936 British drama film directed by John Baxter and starring George Carney, Minnie Rayner and Lilian Oldland. It was written by Con West and was made at Cricklewood Studios.

== Preservation status ==
The British Film Institute National Archive holds a collection of stills but no film or video materials.

== Plot ==
A group of independent small shopkeepers form a co-operative to resist the encroachment of big business. After a failed attempt at an intensive local shopping week, a large department store offers to buy them all out. While most are willing to sell, Mrs. Roberts, a draper, stubbornly refuses to cooperate. Her refusal stalls the deal, but when she finally agrees, the group gets a much higher price than was originally offered.

== Cast ==
- George Carney as Bill Edwards
- Minnie Rayner as Alice Roberts
- Mary Newland as Mary Roberts
- Ernest Butcher as Arthur
- Mark Daly as Scotty
- Edgar Driver as Titch
- Charles Mortimer as director
- Ian Colin as director's son
- Roddy Hughes as David
- C. Denier Warren as manager
- Albert Sandler as himself, orchestra leader
- Haydn Wood as himself, conductor
- Thorpe Bates as himself, singer
- Walter Amner
- Stanley Kirkby

== Reception ==
Kine Weekly wrote: "Excellent characterisation and a strong human dlement makes this somewhat scrappy story of efforts of several small traders to hold their end up against multiple stores very zood entertainment. It is typically British in spirit and has been produced imaginatively and effectively. It should do well anywhere and provide a welcome note of optimism in the untolding of its theme."

The Daily Film Renter wrote: "Appealing human drama of small shopkeepers' fight with big combine, exploiting simple everyday life of provincial town. Variety of man-in-the-street characters happily cast, and directed with sure touch. Unpretentious humour blends with sentiment so as to sustain interest, while interpolation of turns by famous concert artistes gives added box office appeal. ... One of those down-to-earth subjects, in which John Baxter specialises, this picture relies on a simple story played by a team of characters who effectively represent the types one would meet in any small town ... To add to the picture's entertainment appeal, the presence of such well-known names as Albert Sandler, Thorpe Bates, Haydn Wood, Foden's Prize Band, and the Gresham Singers are neatly dovetailed into the story."

Picturegoer wrote: "Athough rather vague in its conclusions, this story of the battle for existence of the small shop keeper against the great chain stores, is novel in conception, well characterised, and is carried out, for the most part, with sincerity and imagination."

Picture Show wrote: "There is little story in it, but it is finely characterised, and the dialogue, if a little on the lengthy side, is good. George Carney and Roddy Hughes, as Cockney and Welsh barbers respectively, are excellent, as are Ernest Butcher and Mark Daly."
