= Leslie Rowson =

British cinematographer (1903–1977)

Leslie Rowson (1903–1977) was a British cinematographer. He was the son of the statistician and film executive Simon Rowson (1877–1950).

Rowson collaborated on several films with the director Michael Powell.

== Selected filmography ==
- The Crimson Circle (1929)
- The Man They Couldn't Arrest (1931)
- The Ghost Train (1931)
- Jack's the Boy (1932)
- Lord Babs (1932)
- Leave It to Smith (1933)
- Soldiers of the King (1933)
- The Man from Toronto (1933)
- Road House (1934)
- My Old Dutch (1934)
- The Iron Duke (1934)
- Can You Hear Me, Mother? (1935)
- Man of the Moment (1935)
- Royal Cavalcade (1935)
- Her Last Affaire (1936)
- The Scat Burglars (1936) – director
- Things Happen at Night (1947)
