= Robb Wilton =

British comedian (1881–1957)

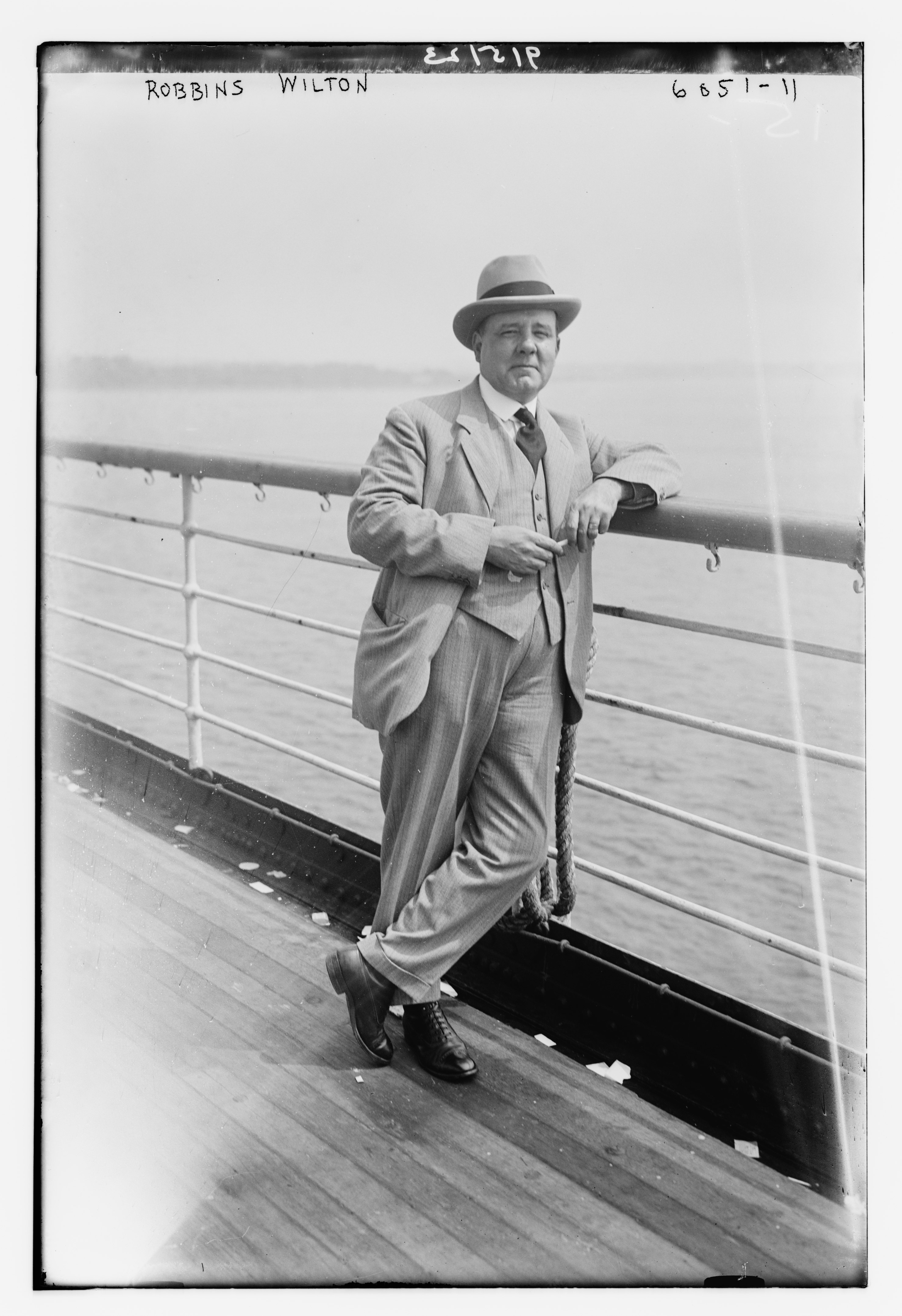
- Born: Robert Wilton Smith; 28 August 1881; Liverpool, England
- Died: 1 May 1957 (aged 75); Liverpool, England
- Occupations: Comedian, actor
- Relatives: Robin Askwith (grand-nephew)

Robert Wilton Smith (28 August 1881 – 1 May 1957), better known as Robb Wilton, was an English comedian and actor. He was best known for his filmed monologues during the 1930s and 1940s, in which he played incompetent authority figures. His trademark was to put his hand over part of his face at the punchline.

== Early life ==
Wilton was born Robert Wilton Smith in the Everton district of Liverpool on 28 August 1881. He was a grand-uncle of actor Robin Askwith.

== Career ==
Wilton had a dry Lancashire accent, which suited his comic persona as a procrastinating and work-shy impediment to the general public. His first theatre work was as a villain in melodramas, but he soon found himself getting laughs from his audience and, by 1909, was touring music halls as a comedian.

Wilton's comedy emerged from the tradition of English music halls. He was a contemporary of northern comedians Frank Randle and George Formby, Sr. He portrayed the human face of bureaucracy; for example, playing a policeman who shilly-shallies his way out of acting upon a reported murder by pursuing a contrarian line of questioning. Wilton, rubbing his face in a world-weary way, would fiddle with his props while his characters blithely and incompetently went about their work, his humour embodying the inherent absurdity of everyday life.

He has been acknowledged as an influence by fellow Lancashire comedians Ken Dodd and Les Dawson, and the film historian Jeffrey Richards has cited him as a key influence for the TV sitcom Dad's Army (1968–1977); he made several monologues in the person of a layabout husband, who wryly takes part in the Home Guard. His gentle, if pointed, manner of comedy is similar to the wistful adventures of the more famous Walmington-on-Sea platoon.

Wilton's best known catchphrase was "The day war broke out..." The phrase was taken from his opening routine for radio which was, "The day war broke out, my missus said to me, 'It's up to you. You've got to stop it.' I said, 'Stop what?' She said, 'The war.' Ooh, she's a funny woman!" He was, along with Tommy Handley, one of the highest profile radio comedians in Britain during the Second World War.

Another frequently reconstructed Wilton monologue was the fire station sketch, in which a bumbling fire officer takes a call reporting the location of a fire, but is sidetracked into trying to remember where it is instead of taking the details of the conflagration: "Grimshaw Street... no, don't tell me... oh, I could walk straight to it..." The sketch would finish with the classic line to the long-suffering householder: "Can you keep it going 'til we get there?"

Possibly his best-known character, Mr Muddlecombe, an incompetent J.P. from the fictional village of Nether Backwash, appeared in a number of radio series during the 1930s and 1940s and was known for the phrase "You shouldn't have done that!" He would also frequently make the comment: "Ee, what a to-do!" The BBC radio programme Mr Muddlecombe JP was first broadcast in January 1937, and went through several series, culminating as Councillor Muddlecombe JP in 1948. The scripts were mostly written by Wilton with producer Max Kester.

He was also a stand-up comedian and one of his jokes was: "A bloke went into a pub and asked, "What soft drinks have you got, barman?". Barman says, "I've got some without vanilla, some without lime, some without lemon. Ah, and one with peppermint!" "Oh, damn", says the customer, "That's the very one I wanted without!"

In October 1928, he appeared in a short film, The Fire Brigade, made in the Phonofilm sound-on-film process. He then appeared in several films from 1934, generally in supporting comic roles. His last film appearance was in the Arthur Askey vehicle The Love Match in 1955.

Wilton was inducted into the exclusive entertainers' fraternity, the Grand Order of Water Rats and served as its "King Rat" in 1947.

== Death ==
On 1 May 1957, Wilton died in Broadgreen Hospital, Liverpool, at the age of 75 following an operation.

== Selected filmography ==
- The Fire Brigade (short) (1928)
- Love, Life and Laughter (1934)
- The Secret of the Loch (1934)
- Look Up and Laugh (1935)
- Servants All (1936)
- It's Love Again (1936)
- Calling the Tune (1936)
- Two's Company (1936)
- Stars on Parade (1936)
- Mother, Don't Rush Me (1936)
- The Interrupted Honeymoon (1936)
- Fine Feathers (1937)
- Take My Tip (1937)
- Break The News (1938)
- The Gang's All Here (1939)
- The Love Match (1955)
