= My Ain Folk (1945 film) =

1945 British film by Germain Burger

- Directed by: Germain Burger
- Screenplay by: Kathleen Butler
- Starring: Mabel Constanduros; Moira Lister; Norman Prince
- Cinematography: Ernest Palmer
- Edited by: Janet Newton
- Production company: Butcher's Film Service
- Release date: 15 January 1945
- Running time: 78 minutes
- Country: United Kingdom
- Language: English

My Ain Folk is a 1945 British comedy drama film directed by Germain Burger and starring Mabel Constanduros, Moira Lister and Norman Prince. It was written by Kathleen Butler.

== Plot ==
Jean Mackenzie is a Highland girl engaged to wireless operator Malcolm Keir. When Malcolm is called up to sea, Jean starts working in a munitions factory. With a good singing voice, she soon becomes the star of the factory's lunchtime concerts. The workers are about to strike when she receives news that her fiancé is missing. She persuades her fellow workers not to strike and, sponsored by the BBC, organises a works concert. During the show, Malcom returns.

== Cast ==
- Mabel Constanduros as Mrs Mackenzie
- Moira Lister as Jean Mackenzie
- Norman Prince as Malcolm Keir
- Herbert Cameron as Mr Keir
- Nicolette Roeg as Betty Stewart
- John Turner as Robertson
- Desmond Roberts as factory manager
- Harry Angers as canteen manager
- David Keir as Gregg
- Ben Williams as Jack McAllister
- Herbert Thorpe as Granpa MacPherson
- Gordon Begg as postman
- Charles Rolfe as Alan McGregor

== Reception ==
The Monthly Film Bulletin wrote: "This is a homely, sentimental production rather overloaded with Scottish songs, all of which, however, are pleasantly rendered. Moira Lister and Norman Prince are an appealing young couple, though the latter has some difficulty with his Scottish accent, and Nicolette Roeg as Jean's friend, Betty, imparts a welcome touch of natural humour to a thin story."

Kine Weekly wrote: "The engaging, chummy tale, which, by the way, is exceedingly well characterised, makes many openings for tuneful old-time songs and all are adroitly seized and exploited ... the story does not employ subtelty, but its sentiment is homely, its humour is clean and typically British, its politics are sound, its war factory detail is authentic and its exteriors are picturesque."

The Daily Film Renter wrote: "Natural story of homely people, with popular Scottish airs introduced in engagement party and works concert. Good camera shots of hills and lochs. Reliable family entertainment. Moira Lister, a promising newcomer, is the quiet heroine of this film ... She has an easy confident style and a pleasant voice, and the good old Scottish songs she sings go a long way towards establishing the entertainment value. ... Mabel Constanduros is cheerily effective as the kindly mother, Herbert Cameron is the boy's likeable father, Nicolette Roeg as Moira's flirtatious friend is a good contrast in characterisation, and John Turner and Desmond Roberts are the typical foreman and manager."

Picturegoer wrote: "Musical comedy drama with a theme song illustrating the title. It deals pleasantly enough with the love affairs of a war worker and a young merchant seaman in Scottish settings. Moira Lister sings and acts nicely as the heroine, daughter of a Scottish widow, played by Mabel Constanduros. Norman Prince is the conventional and likeable hero."
