= Richard Molinas =

British actor (1911–1975)

- Born: 17 November 1911; London, United Kingdom
- Died: 1975 (aged 63–64); Epping Forest, Essex, United Kingdom
- Occupation: Actor
- Years active: 1944–1960 (film & TV)

Richard Molinas (17 November 1911 – 1975) was a British stage and film actor. A character actor, he appeared in a number of supporting roles in postwar British cinema as well as occasional television appearances.

== Filmography ==
Year	Title	Role	Notes
1944	It's in the Bag	Crane	Uncredited
1944	Candlelight in Algeria	French Sergeant	
1946	Gaiety George	Laurient	
1946	Spring Song	Croupier	Uncredited
1948	Easy Money	Johnny	(segment The Night Club Story)
1948	Snowbound	Mancini	
1948	Look Before You Love	Policeman	Uncredited
1949	Portrait from Life	Man in Crowd with Anna	
1949	The Bad Lord Byron	Gondolier	
1949	Children of Chance		
1949	Golden Arrow	Schloss	
1950	State Secret	Red Nose	
1951	Night Without Stars	Driver	Uncredited
1951	Take Me to Paris	Pojo	
1952	Brandy for the Parson	Massaud	
1952	Moulin Rouge	Drunken Provincial	Uncredited
1953	The Sword and the Rose	Father Pierre	
1953	A Day to Remember	Jacques	Uncredited
1954	The Divided Heart	Herr Pieter	
1955	Track the Man Down	Luis Remino	
1956	Peril for the Guy	Signor Caspinelli	
1956	Port Afrique	Captain	
1956	The Spanish Gardener	Police Escort	
1957	Interpol	Borgese	
1957	Let's Be Happy	Bearded Man	
1958	The Strange Awakening	Louis	
1958	The Whole Truth	Gilbert	
1958	The Salvage Gang	Mr. Caspanelli	

== Bibliography ==
- James Robert Parish & Michael R. Pitts. Hollywood on Hollywood. Scarecrow Press, 1978.
