= Robin Hood (1953 TV series) =

1953 TV series

- Patrick Troughton as Robin Hood in a promotional photograph
- Written by: Max Kester
- Directed by: Joy Harington
- Starring: Patrick Troughton; Wensley Pithey
- Country of origin: United Kingdom
- No. of episodes: 6 (5 missing, 1 incomplete)

Production
- Producer: Joy Harington

Original release
- Release: March 17 – April 21, 1953

Robin Hood is a 1953 six-episode British television series starring Patrick Troughton as Robin Hood and Wensley Pithey as Friar Tuck. It was written by Max Kester, and produced and directed by Joy Harington for the BBC. The 1953 series was the first TV production of Robin Hood, although the 1955 series, The Adventures of Robin Hood, remains better known. A still photograph from the series showing Troughton as Robin Hood is seen in a 2014 episode of Doctor Who, the episode being titled Robot of Sherwood.

The 30-minute episodes were transmitted live, and only eight minutes from the second episode, The Abbot of St. Mary's, the earliest surviving footage of Troughton's television career, is believed to exist (as a 16mm telerecording). Troughton's son Michael mistakenly claimed in his father's biography that the full episode survived. Short clips of this material appeared in 2007 documentary, presented by Jonathan Ross, covering Robin Hood from its beginnings to the more recent BBC production (2006), and were also shown as an example of television production in the BBC documentary series Children's T.V. On Trial The 1950s. The surviving footage was also included on the 2020 DVD and Blu-Ray release of an animated reconstruction of the Doctor Who serial The Power of the Daleks, which also starred Patrick Troughton.

== Cast ==
- Patrick Troughton as Robin Hood
- Wensley Pithey as Friar Tuck
- Kenneth Mackintosh as Little John
- Dudley Jones as Much
- John Breslin as Alan-a-Dale
- Josée Richard as Maid Marian
- David Kossoff as Sheriff of Nottingham
- Philip Guard as Will Scarlett
- David Markham as King Edward I

== Episodes ==
1. Gathering the Band (17 March 1953)
2. The Abbot of St. Mary's (24 March 1953)
3. Who Is Robin? (31 March 1953)
4. The Silver Arrow (7 April 1953)
5. A King Comes to Greenwood (14 April 1953)
6. The Secret (21 April 1953)

== See also ==
- List of films and television series featuring Robin Hood
