= Roddy Hughes =

Welsh actor (1891–1970)

- in Cottage to Let (1941)
- Born: Rhodri Henry Hughes; 19 June 1891; Porthmadog, Caernarfonshire, Wales
- Died: 22 February 1970 (aged 78); East Sussex, England
- Occupation: Actor
- Years active: 1932–1961

Rhodri Henry Hughes (19 June 1891 – 22 February 1970) was a Welsh theatre, film and television actor, who appeared in over 80 films between 1932 and 1961.

== Selected filmography ==
- Mr. Bill the Conqueror (1932)
- Reunion (1932)
- Say It with Flowers (1934) - Sam - Newspaper Seller (uncredited)
- How's Chances? (1934) - (uncredited)
- Music Hall (1934)
- A Glimpse of Paradise (1934) - Walter Fielding
- The Old Curiosity Shop (1934) - Short
- Lest We Forget (1934) - Taffy
- Kentucky Minstrels (1934) - Town Clerk
- Breakers Ahead (1935) - Will
- A Real Bloke (1935) - Taffy
- The Small Man (1935) - David
- Cock o' the North (1935) - Taffy
- Honeymoon for Three (1935) - Toomes
- The River House Mystery (1935) - Higgins
- Cheer Up (1936) - Dick Dirk
- Twelve Good Men (1936)
- Men of Yesterday (1936)
- Make-Up (1937) - Mr. Greenswarter
- Captain's Orders (1937) - Cookie
- Little Miss Somebody (1937)
- Poison Pen (1939) - Handwriting Expert
- The Stars Look Down (1940) - Union Committee Member (uncredited)
- The Proud Valley (1940) - Lloyd - Miner (uncredited)
- The Girl in the News (1940) - Doctor (uncredited)
- Charley's (Big-Hearted) Aunt (1940) - Butler (uncredited)
- Under Your Hat (1940) - Film Director
- The Case of the Frightened Lady (1940) - Vicar at Dance (uncredited)
- Saloon Bar (1940) - Doctor Martin
- The Ghost of St. Michael's (1941) - Amberley
- Old Mother Riley in Business (1941)
- Quiet Wedding (1941) - Vicar
- The Saint's Vacation (1941) - Valet (uncredited)
- "Pimpernel" Smith (1941) - Zigor
- Cottage to Let (1941) - German Agent (uncredited)
- Atlantic Ferry (1941) - Minor role (uncredited)
- The Black Sheep of Whitehall (1942) - Journalist (uncredited)
- Hatter's Castle (1942) - Gordon
- Hard Steel (1942) - Coroner
- In Which We Serve (1942) - Photographer
- Meet Sexton Blake! (1945) - Ferraby
- Here Comes the Sun (1946) - Simpson
- George in Civvy Street (1946)
- The Life and Adventures of Nicholas Nickleby (1947) - Tim Linkinwater
- Green Fingers (1947) - Mr. Green (uncredited)
- So Well Remembered (1947) - Chief Librarian
- The Silver Darlings (1947) - Shoemaker
- Fame Is the Spur (1947) - Wartime Miners' Spokesman (uncredited)
- Blanche Fury (1948) - Zeremonienmeister (uncredited)
- There Is No Escape (1948) - The Chaplain
- Mr. Perrin and Mr. Traill (1948) - Doctor
- The Small Back Room (1949) - Welsh Doctor
- The Last Days of Dolwyn (1949) - Caradoc
- Poet's Pub (1949) - Truscott (uncredited)
- Obsession (1949) - Clubman
- The Reluctant Widow (1950)
- Old Mother Riley's Jungle Treasure (1950) - Mr. Orders
- The Man in the White Suit (1951) - Green
- Scrooge (1951) - Fezziwig
- Salute the Toff (1952) - Jolly
- Hammer the Toff (1952) - Jolly
- Escape Route (1952) - Porter
- The Great Game (1953) - Mr. Broderick
- Alf's Baby (1953) - Mr. Prendergast
- The Final Test (1953) - Mr. Harborne (uncredited)
- Meet Mr Lucifer (1953) - Billings
- Trouble in Store (1953) - Taffy (Doorman At Staff Entrance) (uncredited)
- The Million Pound Note (1954) - Clergyman at Bumbles Hotel (uncredited)
- Eight O'Clock Walk (1954) - Minor Role (uncredited)
- John Wesley (1954) - Mr. Bligh
- The Crowded Day (1954) - Chemist
- Mystery on Bird Island (1954) - Grumpy
- One Jump Ahead (1955) - Mac
- See How They Run (1955) - Rev. Arthur Humphrey
- Not So Dusty (1956) - Layton
- Around the World in Eighty Days (1956) - Minor Role (uncredited)
- Sea Wife (1957) - Club Barman
- The Spaniard's Curse (1958) - Jody
- Corridors of Blood (1958) - Man With Watch
- The House in Marsh Road (1960) - Daniels
