= Pastor Hall =

1940 British film by Roy Boulting

- U.S. poster
- Directed by: Roy Boulting
- Written by: Leslie Arliss; Anna Reiner; Haworth Bromley; John Boulting; Roy Boulting; Miles Malleson
- Based on: the play Pastor Hall (1939) by Ernst Toller
- Produced by: John Boulting
- Starring: Wilfrid Lawson; Nova Pilbeam; Marius Goring; Seymour Hicks
- Cinematography: Mutz Greenbaum
- Edited by: Roy Boulting
- Music by: Charles Brill; Hans May (as Mac Adams)
- Production company: Charter Film Productions
- Distributed by: Grand National Pictures (UK)
- Release date: 27 May 1940 (London)
- Running time: 95 minutes
- Country: United Kingdom
- Language: English
- Budget: £25,000

Pastor Hall is a 1940 British drama film directed by Roy Boulting and starring Wilfrid Lawson, Nova Pilbeam, Marius Goring, Seymour Hicks and Bernard Miles. It was written by Leslie Arliss, Anna Reiner, Haworth Bromley, John Boulting, Roy Boulting and Miles Malleson based on the play of the same title by German author Ernst Toller.

== U.S. version ==
The U.S. version of the film opens with an added prologue denouncing the Nazis narrated by First Lady Eleanor Roosevelt, a performance arranged by her son James Roosevelt who was working in Hollywood as a producer. Samuel Goldwyn planned to distribute the film through United Artists but would not go against Production Code Administration (Hays Code) officials, who declared the film "avowedly British propaganda." Committed to the film's importance, James Roosevelt hired screenwriter Robert Sherwood to write the prologue, engineered his mother's involvement, and removed the most violent scenes. PCA officials bowed to the President's son, and the film received approval. United Artists distributed it.

== Plot ==
The film was based on the true story of the German pastor Martin Niemöller who was sent to Dachau concentration camp for criticizing the Nazi Party. In the 1930s, a small German village, Altdorf, is taken over by a platoon of stormtroopers loyal to Hitler. The SS go about teaching and enforcing 'The New Order' but the pastor, a kind and gentle man, will not be intimidated. While some villagers join the Nazi Party avidly, and some just go along with things, hoping for a quiet life, the pastor takes his convictions to the pulpit. Because of his criticism of the Nazis, the pastor is sent to Dachau.

== Cast ==
- Wilfred Lawson as Pastor Frederick Hall
- Nova Pilbeam as Christine Hall
- Seymour Hicks as General von Grotjahn
- Marius Goring as Fritz Gerte
- Brian Worth as Werner von Grotjahn
- Percy Walsh as Herr Veit
- Lina Barrie as Lina Veit
- Eliot Makeham as Pippermann
- Peter Cotes as Erwin Kohn
- Edmund Willard as Freundlich
- Hay Petrie as Nazi Pastor
- Bernard Miles as Heinrich Degan
- Manning Whiley as Vogel
- J. Fisher White as Johann Herder
- Barbara Gott as Frau Kemp

== Critical reception ==
Kine Weekly wrote: "Biography is the dominant medium of expression, and so true is the personal perspestive that the evils of Nazism and the gangsters who enforce its barbaric doctrine are shorn of their sham glory. Wilfrid Lawson fills the name part, and he shoulders his immense responsibilities magnificently."

The New York Times reviewer wrote that "not until Pastor Hall opened last night at the Globe has any film come so close to the naked spiritual issues involved in the present conflict or presented them in terms so moving. If it is propaganda, it is also more...In its production the film is mechanically inferior. The sound track is uneven, the lighting occasionally bad. But in its performances it has been well endowed. Much of the film's dignity and cumulative emotion comes from the fine performance of Wilfrid Lawson as the pastor."

TV Guide called the film "far less heavy-handed than most wartime films Hollywood cranked out after Pearl Harbor."

Pastor Hall was not a great success at the box office.
