= The Scat Burglars =

1936 British film by Leslie Rowson

- Haver (left) and Lee (right) in the film.
- Directed by: Leslie Rowson
- Screenplay by: Fenn Sherie
- Produced by: Simon Rowson
- Starring: Haver and Lee; Shayle Gardner
- Cinematography: Harry Gillam
- Production company: New Ideal Productions
- Release date: 1936
- Running time: 46 minutes
- Country: United Kingdom
- Language: English

The Scat Burglars (also known as Skat Burglars) is a 1936 British comedy film directed by Leslie Rowson and starring Haver and Lee and Shayle Gardner. It was written by Fenn Sherie, and was made as a quota quickie.

== Preservation status ==
The British Film Institute National Archive holds no stills or ephemera, and no film or video materials.

== Plot ==
Hank and Haye are a couple of twits who run a company called Brains, Ltd., and are engaged by an actress to steal her jewels, to generate publicity for her. They do the robbery, but realising the police are after them, they decide to return the loot. They then discover that they have been exploited by the actress's crooked butler and maid.

== Cast ==
- Clay Keyes as Hank (as Haver and Lee)
- Frank Tully as Haye (as Haver and Lee)
- Shayle Gardner as crook
- Ann Ibbitson as child
- Constance Godridge as star
- Craigie Doune

== Reception ==
The Monthly Film Bulletin wrote: "The film opens slowly, continues feebly, and drops dead of inanition."

Kine Weekly wrote: "Crude crosstalk comedy ... There is hardly the semblance of a plot, the co-stars leave their stage reputations behind them, they're singularly unfunny, and the production qualities are, to say the least, shoddy. Five reels without a laugh, the film is in fact, hopeless as a booking proposition. ... Haver and Lee, the popular music-hall and wireless comedians, are left to their own resources, so feeble is the story, but nothing they do succeeds in raising a laugh. Their technique fails to register on the screen and the supporting players are no better off."

The Daily Film Renter wrote: "Hoary old gags, forced humour, witless dialogue and unfunny knockabout are main features, while direction and presentation are distinctly below par. Not recommended. Designed to exploit the comedy talents of Haver and Lee, this pitiful effort is entirely devoid of humour, the co-stars appearing baffled by lamentably poor material."
