= The Turners of Prospect Road =

1947 film

- Directed by: Maurice J. Wilson
- Written by: Victor Katona; Patrick Kirwan
- Produced by: Victor Katona
- Starring: Wilfrid Lawson; Jeanne de Casalis
- Cinematography: Frederick Ford
- Edited by: Kenneth Hume
- Music by: Nicholas Brodszky; Philip Green (conducted by)
- Production company: Victor Katona Productions
- Distributed by: Grand National Pictures (UK)
- Release date: 11 March 1947 (London)
- Running time: 88 minutes
- Country: United Kingdom
- Language: English

The Turners of Prospect Road is a 1947 British drama film directed by Maurice J. Wilson and starring Wilfrid Lawson, Helena Pickard and Maureen Glynne. It was written by Victor Katona and Patrick Kirwan. A pet greyhound wins a major race meeting.

As of 1996, it was missing from the British Film Institute National Film Archive.

== Premise ==
A London cabby finds a greyhound puppy in his cab, and gives it to his daughter. She raises it and trains it up at the race tracks, and in spite of crooked rival owners, the dog eventually wins the Greyhound Derby.

== Cast ==
- Wilfrid Lawson as Will Turner
- Helena Pickard as Lil Turner
- Maureen Glynne as Betty Turner
- Amy Veness as Grandma
- Jeanne de Casalis as Mrs. Webster
- Shamus Locke as Terence O'Keefe
- Desmond Tester as Nicky
- Christopher Steele as Magistrate
- Giselle Morlais as Jacqueline
- Joy Frankau as Ruby
- Andrew Blackett as Andrew Carroll
- Gus McNaughton as Knocker
- Charles Farrell as Jack
- Peter Bull as J.G. Clarkson

== Production ==
The film was shot at Walton Studios with location filming at Clapton Stadium and White City Stadium.

== Critical reception ==
The Monthly Film Bulletin wrote: "This film is unpretentious and pleasantly free from studio artificialities. It affords some useful glimpses into the world of greyhound racing and training and is well acted by Wilfrid Lawson as the long-suffering taxi-driver, a newcomer, Maureen Glynne, as his daughter who can also quote Rupert Brooke, Jeanne de Casalis in her best Mrs. Feather manner, and Peter Bull as an unscrupulous villain."

Kine Weekly wrote: "It has no dizzy aspirations, but it effectively combines human interest with spectacular thrills. The acting is, on the whole, good and atmosphere correct. ... Maureen Glynne shows promise as Betty, and Wilfrid Lawson draws good character as Will. There is a competent sup-" porting cast, headed by Helena Pickard, Amy Veness, Jeanne de Casalis and Peter Bull. Production. – Following a haphazard start, the film steadily builds up to an exciting climax through its artful amalgam of homely sentiment and robust gangster asides. After seeing the seamy side of greyhound racing we no longer wonder why it's the sport of Spivs, but that's merely by the way."

Picture Show wrote: "Unpretentious, homely drama of a taxi-driver's family and the misadventures that follow the acquisition of a greyhound by father and daughter against mother's wishes. It gives us a realistic glimpse of the business of greyhound training, and it also gives us a glimpse of very dirty work at the kennels, which results in the taxi-driver losing his licence and the family facing ruin; which never happens, of course, the greyhound romping home in the dog Derby. Wilfrid Lawson and Maureen Glynne, as father and daughter, give first-rate portrayals, and the supporting cast does well."

Picturegoer wrote: "Slight and somewhat incredible story of a Cockney taxi driver who becomes a racing greyhound owner shrough the machinations of his little daughter and gets mixed up with race track crooks. Wilfrid Lawson gives a sound character study as the taxi driver and Maureen Glynne is very good as the little girl."Picturegoer wrote: "Qlight and somewhat incredible Wm story of a Cockney taxi driver who becomes a racing greyhound owner shrough the machinations of his little daughter and gets mixed up with race track crooks. Wilfrid Lawson gives a sound character study as the taxi driver and Maureen Glynne is very good as the He Bi aid Amy Veness, Peter Bu and Jeanne de Casalis register in"

TV Guide noted, "there are some fine moments of humor in this simple film and the acting is good, though not extraordinary. Made on an obviously limited budget, this is a good example of generic filmmaking, its amiable and predictable story populated by cutout characters."

The film was criticised by sectors of the greyhound industry for stereotypical portrayal of greyhound racing.

== Bibliography ==
- Gillett, Philip John. The British working class in postwar film. Manchester University Press, 2003.
