= Elsie and Doris Waters =

English female comic duo

Elsie Waters
- Born: Florence Elsie Waters; 19 August 1893; Bromley-by-Bow, London, England
- Died: 14 June 1990 (aged 96); Steyning, Sussex, England
- Occupations: Comedian, singer
- Years active: 1890s–1970s
- Known for: Gert and Daisy

Elsie and Doris Waters in character as Gert and Daisy, 1950s

Doris Waters
- Born: Doris Ethel Waters; 20 December 1899; Bromley-by-Bow, London, England
- Died: 18 August 1978 (aged 78); Steyning, Sussex, England
- Occupations: Comedian, singer
- Years active: 1890s–1970s
- Known for: Gert and Daisy

Florence Elsie Waters (19 August 1893–14 June 1990) and her sister Doris Ethel Waters (20 December 1899–18 August 1978) were English comic actresses and singers who performed as a double act. They are remembered for creating the comedy characters Gert and Daisy, and have been described as "the most successful female double-act in the history of British music hall and variety".

== Early lives and career ==
They were born in Bromley-by-Bow, East London, the daughters of amateur singers Maud and Ted Waters, a funeral furnisher, who encouraged all their six children to learn musical instruments. Elsie learned the violin, and Doris the piano and tubular bells; the entire family performed together as E.W. Waters' Bijou Orchestra. Another sibling, Horace John "Jack" Waters (1895–1981), became a leading entertainer and actor from the 1930s onwards, using the stage name Jack Warner.

Elsie and Doris Waters both attended Coborn School for Girls in Bow, and were choristers at St. Leonard's Church. They studied at the Guildhall School of Music, before joining a theatrical company in Southwold, Suffolk. As singers, musicians, and comic entertainers, they started to perform widely in concert parties, at functions, and on variety bills, and made their first appearance on BBC Radio in 1927. From 1929, they made commercial recordings for the Parlophone label.

== Gert and Daisy ==
For one recording, in 1930, they were short of material. Interviewed in the 1970s, Elsie Waters said: "We thought: what on earth can we do? Anyway, we decided to do a talking record for a change. Well, what shall we talk about? Well, we thought, people like wedding bells, so Doll [Doris] sat down and she wrote a little tune and I put some words to it. We called it 'Wedding Bells' and we did a little bit of chat, and that was the first of Gert and Daisy. After we had done it, we forgot all about it." Their banter as Gert and Daisy, drawing on the conversations they had overheard when growing up in the East End, became an immediate success, and audiences requested them to repeat and develop it.

In their performances as Gert (Elsie) and Daisy (Doris), they are credited with developing a new style of observational and naturalistic comedy, with gossipy and sometimes surreal asides delivered in a conversational matter-of-fact way, but sometimes replete with misunderstandings, malapropisms and innuendo. The conversations were critical of Daisy's mythical husband Bert, and Gert's supposed long-standing fiancé Wally, along with their supposed neighbour Mrs Butler. Their scripts were written mostly by Elsie Waters with contributions from her sister. They claimed never to have repeated the same sketch or song, and toured the country, appearing regularly on radio in shows such as Henry Hall's Guest Night.

Doris Waters later commented: "We wouldn't say what they wouldn't say. We know them too well, you see. Having been brought up in the East End of London, we know the way they think." Elsie added: "Gert and Daisy have never quarrelled. They have never been drunk. 'Bert' was always fond of a drink, but not us. We've always been the homely types, which people enjoy. People can identify with us... All good comedy should have truth. Unless Gert and Daisy speak the truth, it's no good."

They appeared in their first Royal Variety Performance in 1934, and became amongst the highest paid British entertainers of the period. During the Second World War, they broadcast cookery and home maintenance hints, gave cookery demonstrations, and were given special passes to make regular trips to entertain troops stationed around the world. Gert and Daisy were favourites of Winston Churchill, and had elephants named after them at London Zoo. They performed regularly on BBC Radio's Workers' Playtime, and their high profile was used by German propagandists such as Lord Haw Haw, who said in one broadcast that "the people of Grimsby must not think that Gert and Daisy can save them from the might of the Luftwaffe." The duo appeared in three films together: Gert and Daisy's Weekend (1941), Gert and Daisy Clean Up (1942) and It's in the Bag (1944), which were all produced by Butcher's Film Service. After the war, they were both awarded OBEs in the King's Birthday Honours List in 1946.

Their first regular radio series was Gert and Daisy's Working Party in 1948, followed by the variety series Petticoat Lane in 1949. Their success continued into the 1950s, and they continued to tour. They made the radio series Floggit's in 1956 (which ran for two series, across 34 episodes and a Christmas special), about two ladies who own a shop in Russett Green. It was written by Terry Nation, John Junkin and Dave Freeman, and the supporting cast included Ronnie Barker, Joan Sims, Ron Moody, Doris Rogers, Iris Vandeleur, Hugh Paddick, Anthony Newley and Peter Hawkins. It was produced by Alastair Scott Johnston and Bill Gates (the producer of Workers' Playtime).

In 1959, the Waters sisters appeared in an ITV television series Gert and Daisy, in which they played landladies of a theatrical boarding house. Created by Ted Willis, who also created Jack Warner's Dixon of Dock Green series, Gert and Daisy was not successful, apparently because it relied on scripts written by others rather than on the sisters' own writing skills. However, they continued to perform in theatrical shows, including pantomimes, into the 1960s, and made occasional television appearances until a few months before Doris's death.

== Personal lives ==
The sisters never married, and lived together in Steyning, Sussex, from the 1930s until their deaths. It was widely understood that Doris Waters had been in a relationship with a diplomat in the 1930s, but after he was posted abroad the sisters agreed to stay together, for professional reasons and to aid the war effort. Attempts in the 1980s to present stage versions of the sisters' lives foundered because of Elsie's refusal to allow any mention of their brother Jack, or of rumours of the sisters' relationships with the same man.

Doris Waters died in 1978, aged 78, after a long illness, and Elsie died in 1990, aged 96.

== Legacy ==
The Australian comedian Dorothy Foster cloned the idea to create "Ada and Elsie", who enjoyed a long career on Australian radio during and after the Second World War.

The Kray twins were nicknamed Gert and Daisy by other East End gangsters in the 1960s. The radio adaptation of Bristow (1999–2000) featured a comic duo, cleaning ladies named Gert and Daisy.

A complete set of transcripts of the sisters' sketches and songs was published in 2003. Wheeler Winston Dixon, Professor of Film Studies at the University of Nebraska–Lincoln, wrote that "Elsie and Doris Waters are perhaps the most influential social satirists of the period", adding:

By forming their double-act around the ever-affianced Gert and the indissolubly married Daisy, they offered women an ontological choice: whether to find their meaning in themselves and with other women, or in the state of gender subalternity, through servitude to men and to patriarchy. By evoking laughter through song, music, patter, gossip, cross-talk, conversation, malapropisms, puns and jokes, through humour, wit, irony, burlesque, parody, satire, ridicule and a gynocentric misanthropy (counterbalancing misogyny), they also invoke a condition of delight, in which men and women might laugh at themselves, at their subject formations, their gender postures, their beings.

In 2011, an exhibition opened at Steyning Museum featuring scripts, sheet music and songs performed by the sisters.
