= Take Me to Paris =

- Theatrical release poster
- Directed by: Jack Raymond
- Written by: Max Catto
- Produced by: Henry Halstead
- Starring: Albert Modley; Roberta Huby; Bruce Seton
- Cinematography: James Wilson
- Edited by: Helen Wiggins
- Music by: Percival Mackey
- Production company: Byron Films
- Distributed by: Associated British-Pathé
- Release date: 1 January 1951
- Running time: 72 minutes
- Country: United Kingdom
- Language: English

Take Me to Paris is a 1951 British second feature ('B') comedy film directed by Jack Raymond and starring Albert Modley, Roberta Huby and Bruce Seton. It was written by Max Catto and made at Walton Studios.

== Plot ==
Mr. Armstrong's racing stable is preparing to send one of its top horses to run in Paris's Maisons Lafitte, when the thoroughbred is unexpectedly injured. Its replacement is Thunderhead, a much lowlier animal, but favourite of jockey and stable lad, Albert. Meanwhile, two crooked stable hands plot to use the cross channel trip to smuggle forged bank notes in the horse's blanket. Their plans are foiled however, by Albert, who also manages to win the big race riding his favourite horse.

== Cast ==
- Albert Modley as Albert
- Roberta Huby as Linda Vane
- Bruce Seton as Gerald Vane
- Claire Guibert as Annette
- Richard Molinas as Pojo
- Alfred Argus as Jules
- Lottie Beck as danseuse
- George Bishop as Mr. Armstrong
- Paul Bonifas as the bistro keeper
- Jim Gérald as butcher
- Gerald Rex as gendarme
- Leonard Sharp as Walter
- Marc Valbel as Maurice

== Reception ==
The Monthly Film Bulletin wrote: "Trivial, quite pleasant, but inexpertly made."

Kine Weekly wrote: "It is too clumsily timed to make good 'thick ear,' and far too dependent upon corny cracks to rock the screen with laughter. Albert Modley, the well-known Yorkshire comedian, is the star, but he is unable to adapt himself to an alien environment. The one redeeming feature is Claire Guibert, a comely and unaffected youngster, cast as the French heroine. Solely for the unsophisticated."

The Daily Film Renter wrote: "Farcical comedy in the racing world, in which the horse seems the most intelligent participator."

Picturegoer wrote: "This picture made me squirm. The story is stupid, the direction loose and there's a glaring lack of attention to detail. ... In order to justify the title the producers have injected shots of Paris. Even they are laboured."

Picture Show wrote: "Lively comedy ... It has a hard-working cast and first-rate Paris settings."

In British Sound Films: The Studio Years 1928–1959 David Quinlan rated the film as "mediocre", writing: "Silly comedy has just the occasional nice moment."
