= Bob's Your Uncle (film) =

1942 British film by Oswald Mitchell

- Still from the film
- Directed by: Oswald Mitchell
- Written by: Vera Allinson; Oswald Mitchell
- Based on: play by Vera Allinson
- Produced by: F.W. Baker
- Starring: Albert Modley; Jean Colin; George Bolton; Wally Patch
- Cinematography: Stephen Dade
- Music by: Percival Mackey
- Release date: 2 March 1942
- Country: United Kingdom
- Language: English

Bob's Your Uncle is a 1942 British comedy film directed by Oswald Mitchell and starring Albert Modley, Jean Colin, George Bolton, Wally Patch, and H.F. Maltby. It was written by Vera Allinson and Mitchell. It depicts the enthusiastic members of a Home Guard unit.

== Premise ==
Home guardsman Albert is in love with Dolly, the daughter of commanding officer Diehard. In order to impress her, Albert tries to raise funds to buy a tank for the village.

== Cast ==
- Albert Modley as Albert Smith
- Jean Colin as Dolly Diehard
- George Bolton as Jeff Smith
- Wally Patch as Sergeant Brownfoot
- H. F. Maltby as Major Diehard
- Johnnie Schofield as stationmaster
- Bert Linden as Corporal Nelson
- Alfred Wright & Co as Pim's Comedy Navy

== Production ==
The film was shot at Welwyn Studios.

== Critical reception ==
Monthly Film Bulletin said "As the whole of this film is based on making fun of the Home Guard, those who believe in the Home Guard will get a good deal of fun out of it, but this point of view would scarcely be understood outside this country. The production is good of its sort and the acting, especially by Albert Modley as Albert Smith, well up to standard."

Kine Weekly wrote: "Refreshing atmosphere and an exuberant climax complete a jolly as well as disarmingly ingenuous wartime show. ... The vaudeville climax, complete with comedy and patriotic vocal interludes, seals the friendly and topical show's obvious industrial, family and provincial success."

Picturegoer wrote: "Albert Modley does well as the recruit and George Bolton is good as his brother. Jean Colin makes an attractive heroine."

In British Sound Films: The Studio Years 1928–1959 David Quinlan rated the film as "average", writing: "Simple broad comedy, quite good of its kind."

Allmovie wrote, "One can gauge the subtlety of Bob's Your Uncle by its character names: Dolly Diehard, Sgt. Brownfoot etc."
