= Eve Lister =

British actress (1913–1997)

- Born: 12 December 1913; Brighton, Sussex, England, United Kingdom
- Died: 31 January 1997 (aged 83); London, England, United Kingdom
- Other name: Phyllis Eve Lister
- Occupation: Film actress
- Years active: 1934–1964

Eve Lister (12 December 1913 – 31 January 1997) was a British film and television actress. She was married to the actor Bernard Hunter.

== Filmography ==
Year	Title	Role	Notes
1934	A Glimpse of Paradise	Marion Fielding	
1934	Hyde Park	Mary Smith	
1935	The Girl in the Crowd	Ruby	
1935	City of Beautiful Nonsense	Amber	
1935	Cock o' the North	Edna Barton	
1935	No Limit	Rita	
1935	Birds of a Feather	Lady Susan	
1936	Sunshine Ahead	The Secretary	
1936	Sweeney Todd: The Demon Barber of Fleet Street	Johanna	
1936	Servants All	Priscilla	Short
1936	Men of Yesterday		
