= Gert and Daisy's Weekend =

1942 British film by Maclean Rogers

- DVD cover
- Directed by: Maclean Rogers; Reg Taylor
- Written by: Kathleen Butler; H. F. Maltby; Maclean Rogers
- Produced by: E. S. Laurie
- Starring: Elsie Waters; Doris Waters; Iris Vandeleur
- Cinematography: Stephen Dade
- Edited by: Charles Knott
- Music by: Percival Mackey
- Production companies: Welwyn Studios; Butcher Empire
- Distributed by: Butcher's Film Service
- Release date: 16 February 1942
- Running time: 79 minutes
- Country: United Kingdom
- Language: English

Gert and Daisy's Weekend is a 1942 British comedy film directed by Maclean Rogers and starring Elsie Waters, Doris Waters and Iris Vandeleur. It was written by Kathleen Butler, H. F. Maltby and Rogers.

It was shot at Welwyn Studios with sets designed by the art director William Hemsley. It was followed by a sequel Gert and Daisy Clean Up (1942).

== Cast ==
- Elsie Waters as Gert
- Doris Waters as Daisy
- Iris Vandeleur as Ma Butler
- Elizabeth Hunt as Maisie Butler
- John Slater as Jack Densham
- Wally Patch as Charlie Peters
- Annie Esmond as Lady Plumtree
- Aubrey Mallalieu as Barnes
- O. B. Clarence as vicar
- Noel Dainton as Detective Inspector
- Arthur Denton as village policeman
- Vi Kaley as old lady whose son is to be evacuated
- David Keir as magistrates clerk
- Jack May as old man dancing on Tube station
- Gerald Moore as Tommy
- Johnnie Schofield as Policeman at Town Hall
- Leonard Sharp as small boy's father
- Jack Vyvyan as village policeman
- Ben Williams as sam the fishmonger

== Critical reception ==
The Monthly Film Bulletin wrote: "The story is naturally outrageous and simply serves as an extravagant setting in which the well-known comediennes Elsie and Doris Waters can perform. This they do excellently and bring to the screen all the verve of their music-hall and radio turns. The supporting players are very much inferior in ability to the stars. On the other hand, the authenticity of real English backgrounds and manners is refreshing after seeing so many Hollywood imaginative attempts to show England to the English."

The Radio Times Guide to Films gave the film 2/5 stars, writing: "Elsie and Doris Waters had been radio stars for some 15 years before they made this rare sortie in front of the movie camera. Starring as the cockney tittle-tattles Gert and Daisy, they escort some East End evacuees to a country house, where the kids end up as chief suspects in a jewel robbery. The sisters usually wrote their own material and took great pains to be original. Consequently, they look distinctly unhappy with the rehashed gags on offer here."

In British Sound Films: The Studio Years 1928–1959 David Quinlan rated the film as "average", writing: "Pretty wild comedy goes at a fair old pace; material is broad but the stars play it with gusto."
