= A Glimpse of Paradise =

- Directed by: Ralph Ince
- Written by: Michael Barringer; Sam Mintz
- Produced by: Irving Asher
- Starring: George Carney; Eve Lister; Wally Patch
- Cinematography: Basil Emmott
- Production company: Warner Brothers
- Distributed by: Warner Brothers
- Release date: October 1934
- Running time: 56 minutes
- Country: United Kingdom
- Language: English

A Glimpse of Paradise is a lost 1934 British crime film directed by Ralph Ince and starring George Carney, Eve Lister and Wally Patch. It was written by Michael Barringer and Sam Mintz. It was made as a quota quickie at Teddington Studios by the British subsidiary of Warner Brothers.

== Preservation status ==
The British Film Institute has classed A Glimpse of Paradise as a lost film. Its National Archive holds a collection of stills but no film or video materials.

== Cast ==
- George Carney as Jim Bigsworth
- Eve Lister as Marion Fielding
- Robert Cochran as Norman Ware
- Wally Patch as Harry
- Winifred Oughton as Mrs. Latter
- Roddy Hughes as Walter Fielding
- Katie Johnson as Mrs. Fielding
- Margaret Yarde as Mrs. Kidd
- D. J. Williams as Bert Kidd
- Fred Groves as Joshua Ware

== Reception ==
Kine Weekly wrote: "Loosely put together and, with few exceptions, indifferently acted. The final twist certainly creates a surprise, but it comes too late to atone for that which has tediously gonebLefore. The film may satisfy the unsophisticated in a supporting feature capacity, but apart from its qualification for quota it has really very little to recommend it ... George Carney is not too bad as Jim; he blends humour with sentiment quite successfully; and Wally Patch during the all too few moments he visits the screen is amusing as Harry. The rest of the players are very stagey. ... The story is so obviously machine-made that it fails to strike the emotions and only occasionally succeeds in providing amusement."

The Daily Film Renter wrote: "Narrative defies credulity, resolving into ludicrous hotchpotch of melodrama and bathos, long arm of coincidence being worked ad nauseam. Sole entertainment values are vested in comicalities of Margaret Yarde and Walter Patch. Booking for the uncritical only."

Picturegoer wrote: "George Carney puts up quite a good performance as an ex convict turned vagrant, who comes to the aid of his daughter, who is being blackmailed, but otherwise there is very little to recommend in this indifferently acted and machine-made production."

Picture Show wrote: "George Carney as Jim Bigsworth, ex-convict, does not appear to have been well cast, although at times he is quite good. Margaret Yarde as Mrs. Kidd, the owner of a fish-and-chip shop, is most amusing. Fair entertainment."
