= Don't Rush Me (1936 film) =

- Trade show advertisement
- Directed by: Norman Lee
- Written by: Fred Karno (sketch); Michael Barringer; Con West
- Produced by: Fred Karno
- Starring: Robb Wilton; Muriel Aked; Peter Haddon
- Production company: Fred Karno Films
- Distributed by: Wardour Films
- Release date: 29 June 1936
- Running time: 70 minutes
- Country: United Kingdom
- Language: English

Don't Rush Me (also known as When We Are Married) is a 1936 British comedy film directed by Norman Lee and starring Robb Wilton, Muriel Aked and Peter Haddon. It was written by Michael Barringer and Con West based on a sketch by music hall performer Fred Karno, who produced the film, and was made as a quota quickie at the Riverside Studios in Hammersmith.

== Preservation status ==
The British Film Institute National Archive holds no stills or ephemera, and no film or video materials.

== Plot ==
A variety of characters get mixed up in complicated farcial roguery: young sporty Jack Honey and his fiancée Tilly, his upstanding uncle Samuel, bastion of an anti-gambling organisation, and his spinster fiancée of thirty years Amy Andrews.

== Cast ==
- Robb Wilton as Samuel Honey
- Muriel Aked as Amy Andrews
- Peter Haddon as Adolphe
- Clay Keyes as detective (as Haver and Lee)
- Frank Tully as detective (as Haver and Lee)
- Bobbie Comber as Louis
- Kathleen Kelly as Tilly
- Kenneth Kove as Bertie Moon
- Wallace Douglas as Jack Honey
- Dino Galvani as Tony
- Hal Walters as Hal
- Nor Kiddie as commissionaire
- Wilson Coleman

== Reception ==
The Monthly Film Bulletin wrote: "Robb Wilton is amusing as the North Countryman who has been engaged for thirty years and still refuses to be 'rushed' into marriage. Muriel Aked as his fiancée is a delightful figure of fun where a less accomplished actress would have been a mere Aunt Sally. Peter Haddon, Kenneth Kove, and Haver and Lee play the fool in their various accomplished styles. There are some hilarious lines and situations, but a good deal that is no more than mildly amusing."

Kine Weekly wrote: "Straightforward farcical comedy, manufacturel from tested ingredients furnished by Fred Karno, the doyen of the English music-hall. Many of the complications, gags and situations upon which the crazy plot rests have seen better days, but thanks to the good work contributed by a strong and versatile team, representative of the screen, stage and radio, the majority score irrespective of their antiquity."

The Daily Film Renter wrote: "Farce comedy revolving ventures of provincial killjoy on whoopee bent in London. Fred Karno's first full-length film; developed on popular lines ... The humour is strongly redolent of the music hall."

Lionel Collier, writing for the British magazine, Picturegoer, gave the film a one-star review and wrote, "Somewhat dated humour is the basis of this very involved farce, which is served better by the artistes, than it is by its plot. ... Generally the picture is well set and photographed but it never quite overcomes its handicap of antiquity in situation and jest."
