= 1942 in British television =

This is a list of British television-related events from 1942.

== Events ==
British television did not broadcast in 1942. Television had been suspended since 1939 for the duration of the Second World War, due to fears that the signals would help German bombers. Television broadcasting resumed in 1946.

== Births ==
- 3 January – John Thaw, English actor (died 2002)
- 5 January – Jan Leeming, journalist, television presenter and newsreader
- 8 January – Robin Ellis, English actor
- 19 January – Michael Crawford, English singer and actor
- 1 February – Terry Jones, Welsh comedic actor and writer (died 2020)
- 7 February – Gareth Hunt, English actor (died 2007)
- 25 March – Richard O'Brien, English actor and writer
- 27 March – Michael York, English actor
- 29 March – Julie Goodyear, actress and television personality
- 12 May – Pam St Clement, born Pamela Clements, actress
- 19 May – Robert Kilroy-Silk, politician and television presenter
- 8 June – Fred Dinenage, television presenter
- 17 July – Peter Sissons, journalist (died 2019)
- 16 August – John Challis, actor (died 2021)
- 17 September – Des Lynam, television presenter
- 24 November – Billy Connolly, Scottish comedian
- 29 November – Michael Craze, actor (died 1998)
- 4 December – Gemma Jones, actress
- 15 December – Geoffrey Davies, actor (died 2023)

== See also ==
- 1942 in British music
- 1942 in the United Kingdom
- List of British films of 1942
