= Valerie Myerscough =

British mathematician and astrophysicist

Valerie Patricia Myerscough (20 June 1942 – 8 November 1980) was a British mathematician and astrophysicist remembered for her precocious talent and great contributions to a range of astrophysical applications, as well as to the evolution of the Royal Astronomical Society, in a very short life.

== Biography ==
Valerie Myerscough was born in the north of England on 20 June 1942. She applied for and was accepted to read mathematics at Royal Holloway College (RHC) aged 16, and graduated first-in-class aged 19, winning the University of London Lubbock Prize and Sherbrooke Prize. Some two years later she was awarded a PhD for a thesis entitled "Continuous absorption by carbon negative ions and other quantal calculations", supervised by M.R.C McDowell.

She worked first as in a post-doctoral post at Durham University, quickly followed by two years from 1965–67 as a Miller Fellow in the Department of Astronomy at the University of California, Berkeley. There, she sufficiently impressed to gain visiting positions over the next few years as Associate Professor at the University of Massachusetts; Research Scientist at the High Altitude Observatory at Boulder, Colorado; Professor at the University of Maryland, College Park; and professor at the University of Texas at Austin. These posts were in addition to a full-time position as lecturer in the Department of Mathematics at Queen Mary College (QMC), which she took up from 1967 onwards. There she taught a variety of theoretical physics and mathematics courses, and engaged in diverse research projects and collaborations, continuing the themes of her PhD.

She was a very active member of the Royal Astronomical Society (RAS), which she joined in 1963; she was awarded a fellowship in 1967. She held a succession of posts, as Honorary Auditor, Council member, Vice-President, Secretary, member of the House Committee; and Convenor from 1976. Notably, she oversaw the restoration of the Herschel Room at Burlington House.

Throughout her life, she engaged fully in the societies in which she found herself; her obituary spoke of her as a care-free extrovert. At RHC she was a member of the Hockey and Netball teams; her visiting positions arose from her enthusiastic embrace American college life whilst at Berkeley. Her lectures at QMC were both erudite and witty, and she is remembered as a supportive member of faculty, concerned about the welfare of her students. She was the social mainstay of the RAS during her time there, "the human face of British astronomy". Besides these endeavours, she was a very active member of the Philharmonia Chorus in London.

Her life was cut short in 1980 by disease, and she died on 8 November 1980. A bursary was created in her name – the Valerie Myerscough Studentships, supporting students in Astronomy, Mathematics and Physics at Queen Mary College and Royal Holloway College. A Valerie Myerscough Prize was also instituted, supporting travel costs for young postgraduate students of the University of London showing outstanding ability in astronomy, mathematics and physics. In 2019 her name was included amongst about 1,000 people shortlisted as candidates to be featured on a forthcoming £50 note to be issued by the Bank of England.
