= Hard Steel =

- Directed by: Norman Walker
- Written by: Roger Dataller (novel); Lydia Hayward
- Produced by: James B. Sloan
- Starring: Wilfrid Lawson; Betty Stockfeld; John Stuart; George Carney
- Cinematography: Claude Friese-Greene
- Edited by: Sam Simmonds
- Music by: Percival Mackey
- Production company: G.H.W. Productions
- Distributed by: General Film Distributors
- Release date: 18 May 1942
- Running time: 86 minutes
- Country: United Kingdom
- Language: English

Hard Steel is a 1942 British drama film directed by Norman Walker and starring Wilfrid Lawson, Betty Stockfeld and John Stuart. It was written by Lydia Hayward based on the 1938 novel Steel Saraband by Roger Dataller. The film was one of four made by G.H.W. Productions backed by the Rank Organisation.

== Premise ==
An ambitious steel worker is appointed to run his local steel mill. He soon outrages the employees with his ruthless behaviour – and his negligence leads to the accidental death of one of the workers. As the Second World War breaks out he realises what he has become, and seeks a chance of redemption.

== Cast ==
- Wilfrid Lawson as Walter Haddon
- Betty Stockfeld as Freda "Ginger" Haddon
- John Stuart as Alan Saunders
- George Carney as Bert Mortimer
- Joan Kemp-Welch as Janet Mortimer
- James Harcourt as Jim Calver
- Frank Atkinson as Dick Sefton
- Arthur Hambling as Mr. Lamport
- John Turnbull as Mr. Rowlandson
- Hay Petrie as Mr. Kissack
- Mignon O'Doherty as Mrs. Kissack
- Philip Godfrey as Forester
- Cameron Hall as Flavell
- Charles Rolfe as Richards
- Kenneth Griffith as Dixon
- Harry Riley as Phillips
- H Victor Weske as Bateman
- Charles Groves as Old Sam
- Clifton Boyne as Carter
- D.J. Williams as Jimpson
- Leonard Sharp as Baker
- Roberta Read as Bertha
- Roddy Hughes as Coroner
- Arthur Seaton as Newcombe
- Dane Gordon as Willis
- David Trickett as Tommy Mortimer
- Angela Glynne as Bunty Phillips

== Reception ==
The Monthly Film Bulletin wrote: "A straightforward, homely, human story, well directed and convincingly produced. Wilfrid Lawson gives a most sincere and effective characterisation of Walter Haddon and is ably partnered by Betty Stockfield as Freda. George Carney and Joan Kemp-Welch are admirable as Herbert and Janet Mortimer. Norman Walker is to be complimented upon having resisted the temptation to embellish. The film smells of Sheffield, and how right that is!"

Kine Weekly wrote: "The construction of the story and its interpretation are a little old fashioned – it's a bit 'lay preacher' in its demand for the head of the dictatorial, intolerant, self-seeking central character – but human domestic and spectacular technical by-play effectively coat the pill. Moreover, its patriotic ending is shrewd as well as relevant showmanship. It should register with the unsophisticated."

Picturegoer wrote: "Melodrama with a somewhat trite moral and a British steel industry background. Wilfrid Lawson is rather theatrical as a ruthless steelworks' foreman who sells his soul for profit but is led back to the path of virtue by his lay preacher friend. The latter part is capably handled by George Cathey. Betty Stockfield and John Stuart Supply the romantic element effectively enough. A patriotic note is struck at the end."

Picture Show wrote: "This is a strong, gripping drama ... It is most convincingly developed against the background of a steel mill, which provides spectacular scenes. It is extremely well acted and directed."
