= Ian Colin =

British actor (1912–1987)

- in The Invisible Man ep: Odds Against Death (1958)
- Born: Ian Colin Marmaduke de Collieur Wetherell; 16 May 1912; Livingstone, Northern Rhodesia
- Died: 20 February 1987 (aged 74)
- Occupations: Film actor Television actor
- Years active: 1933–1967
- Spouse: June Moir (m. 1949; died 1984)
- Children: Peter Wetherell

Ian Colin Marmaduke de Collieur Wetherell (1912–1987), most often credited simply as Ian Colin, was a British film and television actor. During the 1930s, Colin was a leading man in quota quickies. He later acted predominantly in television shows such as The Quatermass Experiment, Emergency-Ward 10 and Coronation Street.

Colin was the son of M. A. Wetherell and Lena McNaughton. In his youth, he was involved, with his father, also an actor, screenwriter, director, producer, and big-game hunter, in creating the hoax "surgeon's photograph" of the Loch Ness Monster—he bought the materials and took the picture.

== Selected filmography ==
- Cross Currents (1935)
- Late Extra (1935)
- Blue Smoke (1935)
- Men of Yesterday (1936)
- Wings Over Africa (1936)
- The Small Man (1936)
- Toilers of the Sea (1936)
- Blind Man's Bluff (1936)
- Born That Way (1936)
- It's Never Too Late to Mend (1937)
- Darts Are Trumps (1938)
- A Dream of Love (short, 1939)
- The Last Load (1948)
- The Queen of Spades (1949)
- The Adventures of Jane (1949)
- The Big Chance (1957)
- The Two-Headed Spy (1958)
- Witness in the Dark (1959)
- Dangerous Afternoon (1961)
- Strongroom (1962)

== Bibliography ==
- Low, Rachael. History of the British Film: Filmmaking in 1930s Britain. George Allen & Unwin, 1985.
