= Max Kester =

British scriptwriter and lyricist (1901–1991)

- Born: Max Kester Dodgson; 11 December 1901; Leeds, England
- Died: 14 December 1991 (aged 90); Reigate, Surrey, England
- Occupations: Scriptwriter, lyricist

Max Kester Dodgson (11 December 1901 – 14 December 1991), known professionally as Max Kester, was a British scriptwriter and lyricist.

== Biography ==
He was born in Leeds, the son of James Dodgson, an artist who drew cartoons for The Yorkshire Post under the pseudonym "Kester". Max Kester Dodgson started work on the Yorkshire Post, and wrote and edited early radio programmes for the BBC in Leeds in 1926, as Max Kester. He moved to London by the late 1920s, and worked for His Master's Voice records. He also became a singer with Ray Noble's Orchestra, and wrote the lyrics for a number of songs composed and recorded by Noble. Most successful was "Love Locked Out", first recorded in 1933 and later sung by many artists including Frank Sinatra in 1957.

Kester recorded and broadcast as one of "Those Four Chaps", together with Claude Hulbert, Bobbie Comber, and Paul England. By 1933, he worked regularly for BBC radio in London, initially writing and presenting variety shows and concert party broadcasts. These included The Air-Do-Wells, introduced in 1934, devised and produced by Kester and Bryan Michie, and for which Kester wrote the lyrics to music provided by Ray Noble. In 1937, Kester wrote and presented The Plums, described by Denis Gifford as the "first radio family to appear in a regular series" on British radio.

In 1939, he devised and produced Danger - Men at Work!, a successful comedy series which continued intermittently until 1947, and co-wrote the political satire Adolf in Blunderland, broadcast in October 1939 shortly after the outbreak of the Second World War. Kester was one of the most prolific BBC radio writers and producers during the war, and worked with comic performers such as Robb Wilton, Lupino Lane, Will Hay, and George Formby as well as on variety programmes.

In 1943, he wrote and produced a radio series, Robin Hood, which provided the basis for the subsequent 1953 TV series starring Patrick Troughton, and in the early 1950s he wrote plays on historical subjects for Children's Hour. After the war he also worked on the theatre acts of such performers as Jack Hulbert, Cicely Courtneidge, Fred Emney and Richard Hearne. He co-wrote the 1949 musical Her Excellency starring Courtneidge.

In cinema he co-wrote the 1941 film Crook's Tour, the 1946 George Formby film George in Civvy Street, and the 1961 film Ticket to Paradise.

He died in Reigate, Surrey in 1991, aged 90.
