= Wilfrid Lawson (actor) =

English actor (1900–1966)

- Born: Wilfrid Lawson Worsnop; 14 January 1900; Bradford, Yorkshire, England
- Died: 10 October 1966 (aged 66); London, England
- Occupation: Actor
- Years active: 1918–1966
- Spouse: Lillian (née Fenn)
- Relatives: Bernard Fox (nephew)

Wilfrid Lawson (born Wilfrid Lawson Worsnop; 14 January 1900 – 10 October 1966) was an English character actor of screen and stage.

== Life and career ==
Lawson was born Wilfrid Lawson Worsnop in Bradford, West Riding of Yorkshire. He was educated at Hanson Boys' Grammar School, Bradford, and entered the theatre in his late teens, appearing on both the British and American stage throughout his career.

He made his film début in East Lynne on the Western Front (1931) and appeared in supporting roles until he took the lead in The Terror (1938). In arguably his most celebrated film role, he played dustman-turned-lecturer Alfred P. Doolittle in the film version of George Bernard Shaw's Pygmalion (1938), alongside Leslie Howard and Wendy Hiller.

He also had memorable leading roles in Pastor Hall (1940), as a German village clergyman who denounces the new Nazi regime in 1934; Tower of Terror (1941) as the wild-eyed maniacal lighthouse keeper Wolfe Kristen; and the title role in The Great Mr. Handel (1942), a biopic of the 18th century composer, all three showing his broad range. He also made a number of films in the United States, beginning with Ladies in Love (1936) and including John Ford's The Long Voyage Home (1940) alongside John Wayne. His last leading role was in The Turners of Prospect Road (1947).

As a result of bouts of alcoholism, Lawson became difficult to work with, and throughout the 1950s his roles became increasingly small—even uncredited in some cases. Despite this he still gave memorable performances such as Prince Andrei Bolkonsky's father in King Vidor's War and Peace (1956), Ed in Hell Drivers (1957) and Uncle Nat in Room at the Top (1958), filmed in Lawson's home town of Bradford.

The 1960s saw something of a career resurgence, beginning with his turn as Black George in Tony Richardson's Tom Jones (1963) and culminating in two of his most notable latter day performances: the decrepit butler Peacock in The Wrong Box and the Dormouse in Jonathan Miller's television adaptation of Alice in Wonderland (both 1966). That same year saw his death, in London, from a heart attack.

His brother was the supporting player Gerald Lawson (born Bernard Worsnop, 30 April 1897 – 6 December 1973) and a nephew was actor Bernard Fox (born Bernard Lawson, 11 May 1927 – 14 December 2016).

== Theatre ==
Year	Title	Role	Notes
1928 – 1929	Getting Married		Princes Theatre, Bristol
1928 – 1929	Major Barbara		Princes Theatre, Bristol
1928 – 1929	Mrs Warren’s Profession		Princes Theatre, Bristol
1928 – 1929	Pygmalion	Alfred Dolittle	Princes Theatre, Bristol
13 – 18 January 1930	The Doctor’s Dilemma	Sir Patrick Cullen	Royal Court Theatre
March 1930	Misalliance	John Tarleton	King’s Theatre, Portsmouth and Royal Court Theatre
21 March – 9 April 1932	Caravan	Membel	Queen’s Theatre, London and Lyceum Theatre, Edinburgh
25 April – 4 June 1932	Heartbreak House	Boss Mangan	Queen's Theatre
30 June – 31 December 1932	Evensong	Arthur Kober	Queen's Theatre
24 August – 7 October 1933	The Ace	Unter Offizer Keller	Lyric Theatre, London
1934 – 1935	Antony and Cleopatra		The Old Vic
22 January 1935	The Barretts of Wimpole Street	Edward Moulton-Barrett	Piccadilly Theatre
31 July – 19 August 1935	Fanny’s First Play		Malvern Theatre, Worcestershire
2 – 20 August 1935	Misalliance		Malvern Theatre, Worcestershire
30 July – 22 August 1935	Volpone		Malvern Theatre, Worcestershire
22 September 1937 – March 1938	I Have Been Here Before	Walter Ormund	Royalty Theatre, Dean Street, London
13th – ? October 1938	I Have Been Here Before	Walter Ormund	Guild Theatre
19 – 24 March 1951	The Paragon	Sir Robert Rawley	Baths Theatre, Wellington, Somerset
26 February 1953	The Father		Arts Theatre
17 August – 28 November 1953	The Devil’s General	Korrianke (Harras's driver)	Savoy Theatre, Lyceum Theatre, Edinburgh, and other locations
15 March – 5 June 1954	The Prisoner	The Cell Warder	Globe Theatre, Olympia Theatre, Dublin, and other locations
12 July – 11 September 1954	The Wooden Dish	Lon (Pop) Dennison	Phoenix Theatre, London, Theatre Royal, Newcastle upon Tyne, and other locations
13 September 1954 – 21 January 1956	Bell, Book and Candle	Sidney Redlitch	Phoenix Theatre, London, Royal Court Theatre, Liverpool, and other locations
5 March – 15 December 1956	The Rainmaker	H. C. Curry	St Martin's Theatre, London, Theatre Royal, Brighton, and other locations
30 September – ? 1958	Live Like Pigs	Sailor Sawney	Royal Court Theatre
9 May 1962 (press night)	The Lower Depths	Luka	New Arts Theatre
26 September 1962 – May 1963	Peer Gynt	Button Moulder	The Old Vic

== Filmography ==
Year	Title	Role	Notes
1931	East Lynne on the Western Front	Dick Webb / Carlyle	
1933	Strike It Rich	Raikes	
1935	Turn of the Tide	Luke Fosdyck	
1936	Ladies in Love	Ben Horvath	
1936	White Hunter	Michael Varek	
1937	The Man Who Made Diamonds	Gallanie	
1938	Bank Holiday	Police Sergt.	
1938	The Terror	Mr. Goodman	
1938	Yellow Sands	Richard Varwell	
1938	Pygmalion	Alfred Doolittle	
1938	The Gaunt Stranger	Maurice Meister	
1939	Stolen Life	Thomas E. Lawrence	
1939	Allegheny Uprising	"Mac" MacDougall	
1940	Dead Man's Shoes	Lucien Sarrou	
1940	Pastor Hall	Pastor Frederick Hall	
1940	The Long Voyage Home	Captain	
1940	It Happened to One Man	Felton Quair	
1941	The Farmer's Wife	Churdles Ash	
1941	The Ghost Train	Minor Role	Uncredited
1941	The Man at the Gate	Henry Foley	
1941	Danny Boy	Jack Newton	
1941	Jeannie	James McLean	
1941	Tower of Terror	Wolfe Kristan	
1942	Hard Steel	Walter Haddon	
1942	The Night Has Eyes	Jim Sturrock	
1942	The Great Mr. Handel	George Frideric Handel	
1943	Thursday's Child	Frank Wilson	
1944	Fanny by Gaslight	Chunks	
1947	The Turners of Prospect Road	Will Turner	
1955	The Prisoner	The Jailer	
1955	Make Me an Offer	Charlie's Father	
1955	An Alligator Named Daisy	Irishman	Uncredited
1956	Now and Forever	Gossage	
1956	War and Peace	Prince Bolkonsky	
1957	Doctor at Large	Dustman. with Cyst	Uncredited
1957	Miracle in Soho	Mr. Morgan	Uncredited
1957	Hell Drivers	Ed	
1957	The Naked Truth	Walter	Uncredited
1958	Tread Softly Stranger	Holroyd	Uncredited
1959	Room at the Top	Uncle Nat	Uncredited
1959	Expresso Bongo	Mr. Rudge	Uncredited
1961	The Naked Edge	Mr. Pom	
1961	Nothing Barred	Albert	
1961	Over the Odds	Willie Summers	
1962	Postman's Knock	Postman	
1962	Go to Blazes	Scrap Dealer	
1963	Tom Jones	Black George	
1964	Becket	Old Soldier	Uncredited
1966	The Wrong Box	Peacock	
1967	The Viking Queen	King Priam	

== Television ==
Year	Title	Role	Notes
1953–1958	BBC Sunday-Night Theatre	Various	6 episodes
1956	Tales from Soho	Barrel Binacre	Episode: "The Message"
1958	Saturday Playhouse	Rafe Crompton	Episode: "My Flesh, My Blood"
1958	Television Playwright	Charles Broderick	Episode: "In a Backward Country"
1958-1961	Armchair Theatre	Various	2 episodes
1959	Tales of the Vikings	Old Saxon	Episode: "Pedigree"
1959-1960	ITV Play of the Week	Various	2 episodes
1960	ITV Television Playhouse	Sam	Episode: "Think of the Day"
1963	Hancock	The Paper Man	Episode: "The Man on the Corner"
1964	Espionage	Lunatic - King George III (uncredited)	Episode: "The Frantick Rebel"
1964	Cluff	Bateson	Episode: "The Daughter-In-Law"
1965	Z Cars	Towser	Episode: "A Matter of Give and Take"
1965	Theatre 625	Mr. Bourne	Episode: "The Siege of Manchester"
1966	Danger Man	Corrigan	Episode: "Not So Jolly Roger"
1966	The Hunchback of Notre Dame	King of the Beggars	3 episodes
1966	Alice in Wonderland	Dormouse	TV film

== Radio ==
Year	Title	Notes
1957	The Stone Faces	
1965	Three Sisters	BBC Home Service Radio
