= Albert Modley =

British comedian (1901–1979)

- Born: Albert Frederick Modley; 3 March 1901; Liverpool, Lancashire, England
- Died: 23 February 1979 (aged 77); Morecambe, Lancashire
- Occupations: Comedian, entertainer
- Years active: 1920s–1970s

Albert Frederick Modley (3 March 1901 – 23 February 1979) was an English variety entertainer and comedian.

== Biography ==
He was born in Liverpool, but moved to Ilkley in Yorkshire with his family as a child. His father, known as 'Professor Modley', ran a gymnasium, and gave exhibitions presenting strongmen such as Eugen Sandow.

Albert Modley won amateur boxing and diving competitions as a youth, but did not follow his father's profession as a physical trainer. Instead, he began work as a delivery boy and then as a railway porter, entertaining in local pubs in his spare time. He made his stage debut at Morecambe, and his London debut in 1931. He started working in a double act with Harry Korris, until 1934.

Wearing an oversized peaked cap, and described as "one of the finest Yorkshire dialect comedians", he appeared in a wide variety of revues, pantomimes, and summer shows. He sometimes performed as a one man band, with drums, xylophone, harmonica and trumpet. From 1940 he toured with his own show, "On with the Modley". From 1949, he became successful on BBC radio as the resident comedian and host on Variety Bandbox. In 1974, he acted in a television adaptation of Alan Bennett's Across the Bay.

He died in Morecambe in 1979, at the age of 77.

== Works ==
- Babes in the Wood (1932/33, pantomime at the Alhambra in Bradford)
- Dick Whittington (1933/34, pantomime at the Princes Theatre in Bradford)
- Mother Goose (1936/37, pantomime at the Alhambra in Bradford)
- Mother Goose (1939/40, pantomime at the Alhambra in Bradford)
- Cinderella (1941/42, pantomime at the Empire Theatre, Sheffield.)
- Bob's Your Uncle (1942, film)
- Mother Goose (1946/47, pantomime at the Empire Theatre, Sheffield.)
- Humpty Dumpty (1949/50, pantomime at the Alhambra in Bradford)
- Up for the Cup (1950, film)
- Take Me to Paris (1951, film)
- Humpty Dumpty (1951/52, pantomime at the Empire Theatre, Sheffield.)
- Cinderella (1953/54, pantomime at the Empire Theatre, Sheffield.)
- The Good Old Days (BBC TV series 1959 and 1968)
- The Leslie Crowther Show (1971, TV series)
- "Play for Today" Sunset Across the Bay (1975, TV drama)
- All Day on the Sands (1979, film)

== Trivia ==
- Modley is well known for his catch phrase "Eeeeeeehh! Isn't it grand when you're daft?!" He made appearances on BBC TV's long running Old Time Music Hall series, The Good Old Days, often poking friendly fun at his home town Morecambe, famous for its huge sandy beaches, with lines such as They're going mad in Morecambe, they've found sand ! - and - Sometimes when the tide goes out, it doesn't bother coming back ! He also performed a well loved tram driver/ conductor routine, conversing with comical imaginary passengers.
- The final issue of the UK's Comic Cuts magazine featured a cartoon of Modley on its cover. This was the magazine's last and 3,006th edition, a world record until it was beaten by The Dandy's 3,007th edition in July 1999.
