= Stephen Dade =

British cinematographer

Stephen Dade (13 August 1909 in Beckenham, Kent – 1975 in Kent) was a British cinematographer.

== Selected filmography ==
- Sailors Don't Care (1940)
- Somewhere in Camp (1942)
- Front Line Kids (1942)
- The Missing Million (1942)
- Gert and Daisy's Weekend (1942)
- Gert and Daisy Clean Up (1942)
- We'll Meet Again (1943)
- Get Cracking (1943)
- Up with the Lark (1943)
- A Place of One's Own (1945)
- Caravan (1946)
- The Brothers (1947)
- Dear Murderer (1947)
- Good-Time Girl (1948)
- Snowbound (1948)
- The Bad Lord Byron (1949)
- Christopher Columbus (1949)
- Don't Ever Leave Me (1949)
- The Dancing Years (1950)
- The Late Edwina Black (1952)
- Appointment in London (1953)
- The Sea Shall Not Have Them (1954)
- The Flesh is Weak (1957)
- A Question of Adultery (1958)
- The Angry Hills (1959)
- Bluebeard's Ten Honeymoons (1960)
- A Terrible Beauty (1960)
- Doctor Blood's Coffin (1961)
- The Snake Woman (1961)
- The Gentle Terror (1961)
- Double Bunk (1961)
- Three on a Spree (1961)
- Dentist on the Job (1961)
- Ambush in Leopard Street (1962)
- Serena (1962)
- Don't Talk to Strange Men (1962)
- The Switch (1963)
- Zulu (1964)
- Coast of Skeletons (1964)
- City Under the Sea (1965)
- The Crooked Road (1965)
- Dateline Diamonds (1965)
- Night Caller from Outer Space (1965)
- The Viking Queen (1967)
