= Iris Vandeleur =

British actress (1884–1969)

- Born: 11 January 1882; Stirling, Scotland, U.K.
- Died: 27 June 1969 (aged 87); Chelsea, England, U.K.
- Occupation: Actress
- Years active: 1938-1961 (film & TV)

Iris Vandeleur (1884–1969) was a British stage and film actress. In 1951 she appeared in the BBC television series Sherlock Holmes as Mrs. Hudson, the landlady.

In the West End she appeared in 1939 in Ian Hay's comedy Little Ladyship.

== Filmography ==
Year	Title	Role	Notes
1938	They Drive by Night	Flower Seller	Uncredited
1941	Love on the Dole	Mrs. Nattle	
1941	Old Mother Riley's Circus	Landlady	
1941	The Common Touch	Alice	Uncredited
1942	Gert and Daisy's Weekend	Ma Butler	
1942	Gert and Daisy Clean Up	Ma Butler	
1942	Rose of Tralee	Mrs. Crawley	
1945	Home Sweet Home	Mrs. Jones	Uncredited
1947	The Silver Darlings	Kirsty	
1947	Fame Is the Spur	Woman Who Opens Front Door	Uncredited
1948	Daughter of Darkness	Mrs. Smithers	
1948	Good-Time Girl	Lodger	
1949	The Spider and the Fly	Cleaning Woman	Uncredited
1952	Emergency Call	Mrs. Flint	
1955	The Love Match	Mrs. Entwhistle	
1955	Track the Man Down	Mrs. Dawson	Uncredited
1958	The Supreme Secret	Grandma	
1960	Trouble with Eve	Mrs. Biddle	
