= Germain Burger =

British cinematographer and film director (1900–1986)

Germain Burger (3 October 1900 – 7 October 1986) was a British cinematographer and film director.

== Selected filmography ==
Cinematographer

- Irish and Proud of It (1936)
- The Penny Pool (1937)
- Down Our Alley (1939)

Director

- Devil's Rock (1938)
- Sheepdog of the Hills (1941)
- Rose of Tralee (1942)
- Death by Design (1943)
- My Ain Folk (1945)
