= Angela Glynne =

British actress (1933–2008)

Angela Glynne (7 September 1933 in Middlesex, England – 22 April 2008 in Northridge, California aged 74) was a British film actress.

== Selected filmography ==
- Bank Holiday (1938)
- Those Kids from Town (1942)
- Gert and Daisy Clean Up (1942)
- Hard Steel (1942)
- Rose of Tralee (1942)
- Demobbed (1944)
- Fortune Lane (1947)
- The Last Load (1948)
- The Happiest Days of Your Life (1950)
- One Good Turn (1951)
- The House Across the Lake (1954)
