= The Great Mr. Handel =

1942 film

- Directed by: Norman Walker
- Written by: Lawrence du Garde Peach; Gerald Elliott; Victor MacLure
- Produced by: James B. Sloan
- Starring: Wilfrid Lawson; Elizabeth Allan; Malcolm Keen; Michael Shepley
- Cinematography: Jack Cardiff; Claude Friese-Greene
- Edited by: Sam Simmonds
- Music by: George Frideric Handel; Ernest Irving
- Production company: G.H.W. Productions
- Distributed by: General Film Distributors
- Release date: 9 November 1942
- Running time: 98 minutes
- Country: United Kingdom
- Language: English

The Great Mr. Handel is a 1942 British Technicolor historical film directed by Norman Walker and starring Wilfrid Lawson, Elizabeth Allan and Malcolm Keen. It was written by Lawrence du Garde Peach, Gerald Elliott and Victor MacLure. The film is a biopic of the 18th-century German-British composer Georg Friedrich Händel, focusing in particular on the years leading up to his 1741 oratorio Messiah.

== Cast ==
- Wilfrid Lawson as Georg Friedrich Händel
- Elizabeth Allan as Mrs. Cibber
- Malcolm Keen as Lord Chesterfield
- Michael Shepley as Sir Charles Marsham
- Max Kirby as Frederick, Prince of Wales
- Hay Petrie as Phineas
- Morris Harvey as John Heidegger
- A. E. Matthews as Charles Jennens
- Frederick Cooper as Pooley
- Andrew Leigh as Captain Coram

== Production ==
The film was made by the Rank Organisation at Denham Film Studios, using Technicolor. After a private screening, the company head J. Arthur Rank criticised its lack of glamorous appeal.

== Release ==
=== Box office ===
The film was not a box office success on its release.

=== Reception ===
The Monthly Film Bulletin wrote: "It is not – nor is it meant to be – a complete picture of Handel. It is not – nor is it meant to be – a complete picture of London life in the 18th century. It is nevertheless an entertaining film showing incidents in the life of the composer, chiefly while he was composing the music of the Messiah. The treatment is episodic, and the episodes are linked by a series of London Cries, beautifully sung and pictured in Technicolor. Care has been taken to create the right atmosphere and the producer is to be congratulated on avoiding bad howlers. The music is beautifully rendered by the London Philharmonic Orchestra though Handel never heard the Hallelujah Chorus on such a grand scale. ... The colour is beautiful if subdued, but the continuity leaves something to be desired. Of the acting the impression is left that Mrs. Cibber was a high soprano and also a contralto, that Handel was a hard, leanish Englishman in wig and costume, and that Lord Chesterfield was almost the only one at home in the costume and manner of his period. Nevertheless the film is eminently sincere."

Kine Weekly wrote: "Wilfrid Lawson explores new fields with his portrayal of Handel, a role that affords him ample scope for his abilities as a character star, Elizabeth Allan is seen to advantage as the lovely prima donna, Mrs. Cibber, and hand-picked players are well in evidence in other important parts."

Variety wrote: "Obviously and inevitably music is the keynote of (and triumphantly dominates) the film. As played by the London Philharmonic Orchestra it is a feast of tonal beauty. The production, sedulously correct and true to the period, mirrors the London of 200 years ago in a series of Hogarth-like paintings come fo life. Costumes and sets sumptuously colorful and, in these days of clothes coupons, surprisingly extravagant. ... Wilfrid Lawson in the title role speaks with a pronounced German accent but is virile enough to make his defiance of the Prince of Wales and a bishop of the Church of England ring true. ... As Mrs. Cibber, the diva, Elizabeth Allan is a radiant beauty with a seemingly endless wardrobe of entrancing crinoline gowns."
