= Rose of Tralee (1942 film) =

- Trade advertisement
- Directed by: Germain Burger
- Written by: Kathleen Butler; H. F. Maltby
- Story by: Oswald Mitchell; Ian Walker; Kathleen Tyrone
- Produced by: F. W. Baker
- Starring: John Longden; Lesley Brook; Angela Glynne
- Cinematography: Geoffrey Faithfull
- Edited by: A. Charles Knott
- Distributed by: Butcher's Film Service
- Release date: 1942
- Running time: 77 minutes
- Country: United Kingdom
- Language: English

Rose of Tralee is a 1942 British musical film directed by Germain Burger and starring John Longden, Lesley Brook and Angela Glynne. It was written by Kathleen Butler and H. F. Maltby and concerns an Irish singer who heads to America to pursue his dream of stardom.

== Preservation status ==
The British Film Institute National Archive holds a collection of ephemera but no film or video materials.

== Plot ==
Struggling Irish singer Paddy O'Brien can no longer support his wife Mary and their young daughter Rose. When Mary's wealthy uncle, Stephen Graham, offers to provide for them on the condition that Paddy leaves them, Paddy reluctantly agrees. His plan is to go to America, make his fortune, and then bring his family over to join him. After a long, hard struggle, Paddy finally achieves success in America, and returns to England just after the outbreak of the Second World War. While he was away, Stephen has died, leaving Mary and Rose poorer than ever. Paddy joins the R.A.F., and through a series of coincidences the family is happily reunited.

== Cast ==
- John Longden as Paddy O'Brien
- Lesley Brook as Mary O'Brien
- Angela Glynne as Rose O'Brien
- Mabel Constanduros as Mrs Thompson
- Talbot O'Farrell as Tim Kelly
- Gus McNaughton as Gleeson
- George Carney as Collett
- Virginia Keiley as Jean Hale
- Iris Vandeleur as Mrs Crawley
- Morris Harvey as McIsaac

== Reception ==
The Monthly Film Bulletin wrote: "The story is rather slight and there is far more sentiment than is necessary. The film is brought up to date by introducing the war as a background, but the acting is rather forced. Nevertheless, Iris Vandeleur as the heartless landlady, Mrs. McCrawley, who throws Mary and Rose out when they cannot pay their bill, makes a brief but excellent appearance, and John Longden, as Paddy, sings a number of Irish songs quite well."

Kine Weekly wrote: "The play is a simple, down-to-earth dramatisation of the tuneful and enduring song. Its obvious, yet evergreen, sentiment effectively colours a number of stern and amusing home-front cameos, and these, paraded in sequence and set to popular melody, furnish the bricks and mortar of popular emotional melodrama."

The Daily Film Renter wrote: "The story is appealing throughout and amply provides with pathos and sentiment. Johty Longden, as Paddy, is in good voice in well known Irish songs. Lesley Brook sympathetically portrays Mary, while little Angela Glynne will delight all the women with her song and dialogue."

== See also ==
- "The Rose of Tralee" (song)
- Rose of Tralee (1937 film)
