= 1942 in the United Kingdom =

Events from the year 1942 in the United Kingdom. The year was dominated by the Second World War.

== Incumbents ==
- Monarch – George VI
- Prime Minister – Winston Churchill (Coalition)

== Events ==
- 1 January
  - Sneyd Colliery Disaster: An underground explosion in the North Staffordshire Coalfield kills 55.
  - Book Production War Economy Agreement comes into force.
- 9–29 January – 1942 Betteshanger miners' strike in the Kent Coalfield.
- 10 January – World War II: Liverpool Blitz ends with German bombs dropped in the Stanhope Street area of the city, with nine people dying and many more suffering injuries. Among the houses destroyed in the bombing is the former home of Adolf Hitler's half-brother Alois. Four more people die as a result of their injuries the following day.
- 26 January – World War II: First United States troops for the European theatre arrive in the UK, at Belfast.
- 29 January – radio programme Desert Island Discs first broadcast on the BBC Forces Programme, presented by Roy Plomley; Austrian-born revue performer Vic Oliver (the Prime Minister's son-in-law) is the first castaway. The programme will still be running 80 years later.
- January – Mildenhall Treasure discovered by ploughman Gordon Butcher in Suffolk.
- February–April – Liverpool Chinese seamen strike for improved pay.
- 7 February – soap rationing introduced.
- 15 February – World War II: General Arthur Percival's forces surrender to the Japanese in the event known as the Fall of Singapore.
- 16 February – National Service (No. 2) Act introduces conscription to the Home Guard.
- 19 February – Clement Attlee is appointed first Deputy Prime Minister of the United Kingdom.
- 25 February – Princess Elizabeth (later Queen Elizabeth II) registers for war service.
- April – Women's Timber Corps set up.
- 5 April – World War II: Japanese Navy attacks Colombo in Ceylon (Sri Lanka). Royal Navy Cruisers HMS Cornwall and HMS Dorsetshire are sunk southwest of the island.
- 9 April – World War II: Japanese Navy launches air raid on Trincomalee in Ceylon (Sri Lanka); Royal Navy aircraft carrier HMS Hermes and Royal Australian Navy destroyer HMAS Vampire are sunk off the island's east coast.
- 23 April
  - World War II: Exeter becomes the first city bombed as part of the "Baedeker Blitz" in retaliation for the British bombing of Lübeck.
  - Exeter-born William Temple is enthroned as Archbishop of Canterbury (being translated from York) in succession to Cosmo Gordon Lang.
- 24 April – Barnburgh Main Colliery collapse: 4 killed.
- 25–27 April – World War II: "Baedeker Blitz" – Bath Blitz: three bombing raids on Bath kill 417; among the buildings destroyed or badly damaged the Assembly Rooms are gutted.
- 1 May – destroyer HMS Punjabi sinks after collision with battleship HMS King George V in Arctic waters with 49 fatalities.
- 5 May–6 November – World War II: Battle of Madagascar; British commander Robert Sturges leads the invasion of Vichy French-held Madagascar.
- 6 May – The Radio Doctor (Charles Hill) makes his first BBC radio broadcast giving avuncular health care advice.
- 30 May – World War II: First RAF "thousand bomber raid" sets off to carry out the bombing of Cologne in Germany.
- 15 June – propaganda film The Next of Kin is commercially released by Ealing Studios.
- July–August – J. Arthur Rank's Odeon Cinemas purchase UK sites of Paramount Cinemas.
- July
  - Military scientists begin testing of anthrax as a biological warfare agent on the Scottish island of Gruinard.
  - Total evacuation of Stanford Training Area on Breckland in Norfolk.
  - Canned dried (powdered) eggs from the United States become available to British consumers.
- 10 July – the patriotic Academy Award-winning drama film Mrs. Miniver, starring Greer Garson, is released in London.
- 26 July – rationing of sweets and chocolate begins.
- 11 August – traffic admitted onto the new Waterloo Bridge across the River Thames in London.
- 19 August – World War II: British and Canadian troops conduct the Dieppe Raid.
- 25 August – Dunbeath air crash: Prince George, Duke of Kent, brother of George VI, is among 14 killed in a military air crash near Caithness, Scotland.
- 30 August–2 September – World War II: At the Battle of Alam el Halfa in Egypt, General Montgomery leads the Eighth Army to victory over Field Marshal Rommel's Afrika Korps.
- September – The Brains Trust first broadcast under this title on BBC Home Service radio.
- 12 September – World War II: British transport ship RMS Laconia torpedoed and sunk by a German U-boat in the Atlantic, west of Africa, with the loss of around 2,000 lives, mainly Italian prisoners of war.
- 13 September – World War II:
  - The RAF and the Soviet Air Force bomb oil wells and refining facilities at Ploeşti in Romania causing extensive damage.
  - The RAF carries out its 100th bombing raid on the German city of Bremen.
- 17 September – Noël Coward's film In Which We Serve premieres.
- 23 September
  - The British Council of Churches, an ecumenical organisation, is established, as is the Council of Christians and Jews.
  - World War II: British forces capture the capital of Madagascar, Antananarivo.
- 2 October
  - British cruiser Curaçao collides with troopship RMS Queen Mary off the coast of Donegal and sinks: 338 drown.
  - World War II: Japanese troopship Lisbon Maru sinks following a torpedo attack the previous day by submarine USS Grouper off the coast of China: 829 are killed, mostly British prisoners of war who (unknown to the attacker) are being held on board.
- 5 October – Oxford Committee for Famine Relief founded.
- 9 October – the Statute of Westminster Adoption Act passed by the Parliament of Australia formalises Australian autonomy from the U.K.
- 23 October – World War II: British and Commonwealth forces launch a major attack against German and Italian forces in the Second Battle of El Alamein in Egypt.
- 25 October – the milk ration is cut to two and a half pints a week.
- 29 October – a public meeting presided over by the Archbishop of Canterbury and with international political figures in attendance at the Royal Albert Hall in London registers outrage over The Holocaust.
- 30 October – World War II: British sailors board German submarine U-559 as it sinks in the Mediterranean and retrieve its Enigma machine and codebooks.
- 31 October – World War II: Canterbury is bombed by the German Luftwaffe, apparently in reprisal for an RAF 1,000 bomber raid on Cologne.
- 4 November – World War II: Second Battle of El Alamein effectively ends with Erwin Rommel forced to order German forces to retreat this evening in the face of pressure from General Montgomery's Eighth Army. Clearing up operations continue until 11 November.
- 6 November – the Church of England archbishops announce relaxation of the custom that women should wear hats in church.
- 8 November – World War II: British and American troops invade French North Africa in Operation Torch.
- 13 November – World War II: Allied troops recapture Tobruk.
- 17 November – World War II: Admiral Max Horton takes over from Percy Noble as Commander-in-Chief, Western Approaches, with responsibility for the safety of Atlantic convoys.
- 1 December – publication of the Beveridge Report into social insurance. It is so popular that people queue overnight to buy it and the government issues a brief threepenny version.
- 7 December – World War II: British commandos conduct Operation Frankton, a raid on shipping in Bordeaux harbour.
- 16 December – the Trades Union Congress backs the Beveridge Report.
- 30 December – British insurance companies attack the Beveridge Report.
- World War II
  - Maunsell Forts erected in the Thames Estuary.
  - The National Loaf, a fortified wholemeal bread, becomes the only variety available from bakers.

== Publications ==
- "Flying Officer X" (H. E. Bates)'s short story collection The Greatest People in the World.
- "BB"'s children's story The Little Grey Men.
- Enid Blyton's children's story Five on a Treasure Island, first in The Famous Five series.
- Joyce Carey's novel To Be a Pilgrim.
- Agatha Christie's novels The Body in the Library (Miss Marple), Five Little Pigs (Hercule Poirot) and The Moving Finger (Miss Marple; US).
- T. S. Eliot's poem Little Gidding, last of the Four Quartets (in October New English Weekly).
- Richard Hillary's wartime autobiography The Last Enemy.
- C. S. Lewis' novel The Screwtape Letters.
- Alker Tripp's text Town Planning and Road Traffic.
- Evelyn Waugh's novel Put Out More Flags.

== Births ==
=== January – April ===
- 3 January – John Thaw, English actor (died 2002)
- 5 January – Jan Leeming, TV presenter and newsreader
- 8 January
  - Robin Ellis, English actor
  - Stephen Hawking, English cosmologist (died 2018)
  - George Passmore, English artist (Gilbert and George)
- 19 January – Michael Crawford, English singer and actor
- 21 January – George Foulkes, Labour MP and peer
- 31 January – Derek Jarman, English director and writer (died 1994)
- 1 February – Terry Jones, Welsh actor, writer and director (died 2020)
- 2 February – Graham Nash, English musician
- 5 February – Susan Hill, English author
- 7 February – Gareth Hunt, English actor (died 2007)
- 10 February – John Clarke, British physicist, winner of the Nobel Prize in Physics
- 11 February – Charles Harrison, British art historian (died 2009)
- 12 February – Norma Major, philanthropist and spouse of John Major
- 15 February – Glyn Johns, English recording engineer
- 19 February – Howard Stringer, Welsh businessman
- 22 February – Peter Abbs, English poet and academic (died 2020)
- 24 February – Paul Jones, singer
- 27 February – Mike Bailey, British footballer
- 28 February – Brian Jones, English rock musician (The Rolling Stones) (died 1969)
- 9 March – John Cale, Welsh composer and musician
- 13 March – Geoffrey Hayes, English television presenter and actor (died 2018)
- 14 March – Rita Tushingham, English actress
- 25 March
  - Richard O'Brien, English actor and writer
  - Kim Woodburn, English television personality (died 2025)
- 27 March
  - Michael Jackson, English writer about beer and whisky (died 2007)
  - John Sulston, English molecular biologist, recipient of the Nobel Prize in Physiology or Medicine (died 2018)
  - Michael York, English actor
- 28 March
  - Neil Kinnock, Welsh-born politician
  - Janet Nelson, English historian (died 2024)
  - Mike Newell, British film director
- 29 March – Julie Goodyear, English actress
- 1 April
  - Brian Binley, businessman and politician (died 2020)
  - Roderick Floud, historian and academic
- 5 April – Peter Greenaway, Welsh filmmaker
- 8 April
  - Roger Chapman, English rock singer (Family, Streetwalkers)
  - Tony Banks, Baron Stratford, Labour Party MP and Minister for Sport (died 2006)
- 12 April – Bill Bryden, Scottish-born theatre director (died 2022)
- 16 April – Sir Frank Williams, Formula One team owner (died 2021)
- 17 April – David Bradley, English actor
- 19 April
  - David Fanshawe, English composer (died 2010)
  - Alan Price, English musician
- 20 April – Giles Henderson, English lawyer and academic
- 28 April – Mike Brearley, cricketer

=== May – August ===
- 4 May – Sandy Bruce-Lockhart, Baron Bruce-Lockhart, politician (died 2008)
- 8 May
  - Norman Lamont, politician, Chancellor of the Exchequer
  - Terry Neill, Northern Irish footballer and football manager (died 2022)
- 11 May – Rachel Billington, writer
- 12 May – Ian Dury, British musician (died 2000)
- 13 May – Jeff Astle, British footballer (died 2002)
- 18 May – Nobby Stiles, England footballer (died 2020)
- 20 May – Lynn Davies, Welsh long jump Olympic champion
- 24 May – Sir Fraser Stoddart, Scottish-born scientist, recipient of the Nobel Prize in Chemistry (died 2024)
- 25 May – Brian Davison, rock drummer (died 2008)
- 29 May – Charlotte Johnson Wahl, artist, mother of Boris Johnson (died 2021)
- 2 June – Tony Buzan, popular psychologist (died 2019)
- 8 June
  - Fred Dinenage, journalist and television presenter
  - Doug Mountjoy, Welsh snooker player (died 2021)
- 9 June – Ossie Clark, fashion designer (murdered 1996)
- 10 June – Gordon Burns, television presenter
- 18 June
  - Pat Hutchins, English illustrator and writer (died 2017)
  - Paul McCartney, English musician and composer (The Beatles)
- 20 June
  - Andrew Graham, economist and academic
  - Valerie Myerscough, mathematician and astrophysicist (died 1980)
- 23 June – Martin Rees, Baron Rees of Ludlow, cosmologist and astrophysicist
- 24 June – Dustin Gee, British comedian (died 1986)
- 25 June – Patricia Brake, English actress (died 2022)
- 1 July – Julia Higgins, polymer scientist
- 4 July – Prince Michael of Kent
- 7 July – Tom Blundell, scientist
- 12 July – Tam White, Scottish musician and actor (died 2010)
- 16 July – Frank Field, Baron Field of Birkenhead, politician (died 2024)
- 17 July
  - Peter Sissons, English newsreader and journalist (died 2019)
  - Zoot Money, vocalist, keyboardist and bandleader (died 2024)
- 23 July – Myra Hindley, English murderer (died 2002)
- 27 July
  - Mystic Meg, born Margaret Lake, astrologer (died 2023)
  - Ernie Ross, Scottish politician (died 2021)
- 31 July – James Douglas-Hamilton, Baron Selkirk of Douglas, politician (died 2023)
- 7 August – Richard Sykes, microbiologist and businessman
- 12 August – David Munrow, musician and music historian (died 1976)
- 16 August – John Challis, English actor and comedian (died 2021)
- 17 August – Alfreda Thorogood, ballet dancer and teacher
- 24 August – Peter Gummer, Baron Chadlington, English businessman
- 25 August – Howard Jacobson, novelist and journalist
- 26 August – Dennis Turner, British politician (died 2014)

=== September – December ===
- 15 September – Philip Harris, entrepreneur and educationist
- 17 September – Des Lynam, Irish-born TV sports presenter
- 18 September – Alex Stepney, footballer and coach
- 24 September – Gerry Marsden, Merseybeat singer-songwriter (died 2021)
- 27 September
  - Tessa Blackstone, English academic administrator, public servant and Labour politician
  - Alvin Stardust, born Bernard Jewry, English pop singer (died 2014)
- 29 September - Ian McShane, English actor
- 30 September – Gus Dudgeon, English record producer (died 2002)
- 21 October – John Stevens, Baron Stevens of Kirkwhelpington, English police officer
- 23 October – Anita Roddick, English businesswoman and environmentalist (died 2007)
- 26 October – Bob Hoskins, English actor (died 2014)
- 27 October – Phil Chisnall, footballer (died 2021)
- 28 October – Freddie Williams, Scottish businessman (died 2008)
- 7 November – Jean Shrimpton, English fashion model and actress
- 23 November – Jane Lumb, English fashion model and actress (died 2008)
- 24 November
  - Billy Connolly, Scottish comedian
  - Craig Thomas, Welsh thriller writer (died 2011)
- 29 November – Michael Craze, English actor (died 1998)
- 2 December – Dennis Kirkland, English television producer (died 2006)
- 4 December
  - Tim Boswell, farmer and politician
  - Gemma Jones, English character actress
- 6 December – Richard Shepherd, politician (died 2022)
- 8 December – Robin Medforth-Mills, professor (died 2002)
- 12 December – Morag Hood, Scottish actress (died 2002)
- 13 December
  - Howard Brenton, playwright and screenwriter
  - Charles R. Burton, English explorer (died 2002)
- 21 December – Frances Ritchie, nurse and religious sister
- 31 December – Andy Summers, English rock musician

== Deaths ==
- 16 January – Prince Arthur, Duke of Connaught and Strathearn, third eldest son of Queen Victoria (born 1850)
- 10 March – Sir William Henry Bragg, physicist, Nobel Prize laureate (born 1862)
- 27 March – Vernon Kell ('K'), first director of MI5 (born 1873)
- 16 April – Princess Alexandra of Edinburgh and Saxe-Coburg and Gotha, granddaughter of Queen Victoria, in Germany (born 1878)
- 17 April – Laura Annie Willson, mechanical engineer and suffragette (born 1877)
- 23 May – Charles Robert Ashbee, designer (born 1863)
- 7 June – Alan Blumlein, electronics engineer (born 1903; killed in military aircraft accident)
- 18 June – Sutherland Macdonald, tattoo artist (born 1860)
- 22 July
  - Gilbert Joyce, Bishop of Monmouth (born 1866)
  - Conrad Noel, vicar and socialist (born 1869)
- 28 July – Sir Flanders Petrie, Egyptologist (born 1853)
- 10 August – Bob Kelso, Scottish footballer (born 1865)
- 25 August – Prince George, Duke of Kent, fourth eldest son of George V (born 1902; killed on active service in military aircraft accident)
- 4 December – Hugh Malcolm, Scottish Royal Air Force officer, posthumous recipient of the Victoria Cross (born 1917; killed in action)
- 22 December – E. H. Jones, Welsh army officer, educationist and writer (born 1883)

== See also ==
- List of British films of 1942
- Military history of the United Kingdom during World War II
