= Gert and Daisy Clean Up =

1942 British film by Maclean Rogers

- Directed by: Maclean Rogers
- Written by: Kathleen Butler; H. F. Maltby; Elsie Waters; Doris Waters; Harry Gibbs
- Produced by: F.W. Baker
- Starring: Elsie Waters; Doris Waters; Iris Vandeleur
- Cinematography: Jack Parker; Stephen Dade
- Edited by: Charles Knott
- Music by: Percival Mackey
- Production company: Butcher's Film Service
- Distributed by: Butcher's Film Service
- Release date: August 1942
- Running time: 85 minutes
- Country: United Kingdom
- Language: English

Gert and Daisy Clean Up is a 1942 British comedy film directed by Maclean Rogers and starring Elsie Waters, Doris Waters and Iris Vandeleur. It was written by Kathleen Butler and H. F. Maltby, with additional dialogue by Elsie and Doris Waters and Harry Gibbs.

== Plot ==
Gert and Daisy are working in a restaurant but are sacked when the mayor is served yellow soap instead of cheese. They subsequently expose the black-marketing activities of local grocer Mr Perry.

== Cast ==
- Elsie Waters as Gert
- Doris Waters as Daisy
- Iris Vandeleur as Ma Butler
- Elizabeth Hunt as Hettie
- Toni Edgar-Bruce as Mrs. Wilberforce
- Joss Ambler as Mr. Perry
- Ralph Michael as Jack Gregory
- Uriel Porter as Snow White
- Harry Herbert as Old Cheerful
- Angela Glynne as girl
- Arthur Hambling as PC Albert Green
- Johnnie Schofield as policeman on night duty
- Douglas Stewart as mayor
- David Trickett as boy

== Production ==
The film's sets were designed by the art director Andrew Mazzei. It was shot at the Riverside Studios in Hammersmith.

== Reception ==
The Monthly Film Bulletin wrote: "A good rollicking farce into which a very topical message has been adroitly sandwiched. Elsie and Doris Waters give a characteristically buoyant performance as Gert and Daisy and they are supported by a cast who are at the same time very amusing and most naturally human. The film is efficiently directed and produced and the inclusion of several boisterous songs from Gert and Daisy and a negro spiritual, sung in a truly Robesonesque fashion by Uriel Porter, adds to its general appeal."

Picture Show wrote: "Good, clean fun is provided by the latest adventures of Gert and Daisy which provide a comical commentary on war-time domestic life ... Elsie and Doris Waters are the life and soul of the film, and there is no lack of comedy situations and.typical repartee, and one or two catchy songs."

In British Sound Films: The Studio Years 1928–1959 David Quinlan rated the film as "average", writing: "Rumbustuous farce with ebullient performances from the stars."
