= List of British films of 1935 =

British films released in 1935

A list of British films released in 1935.

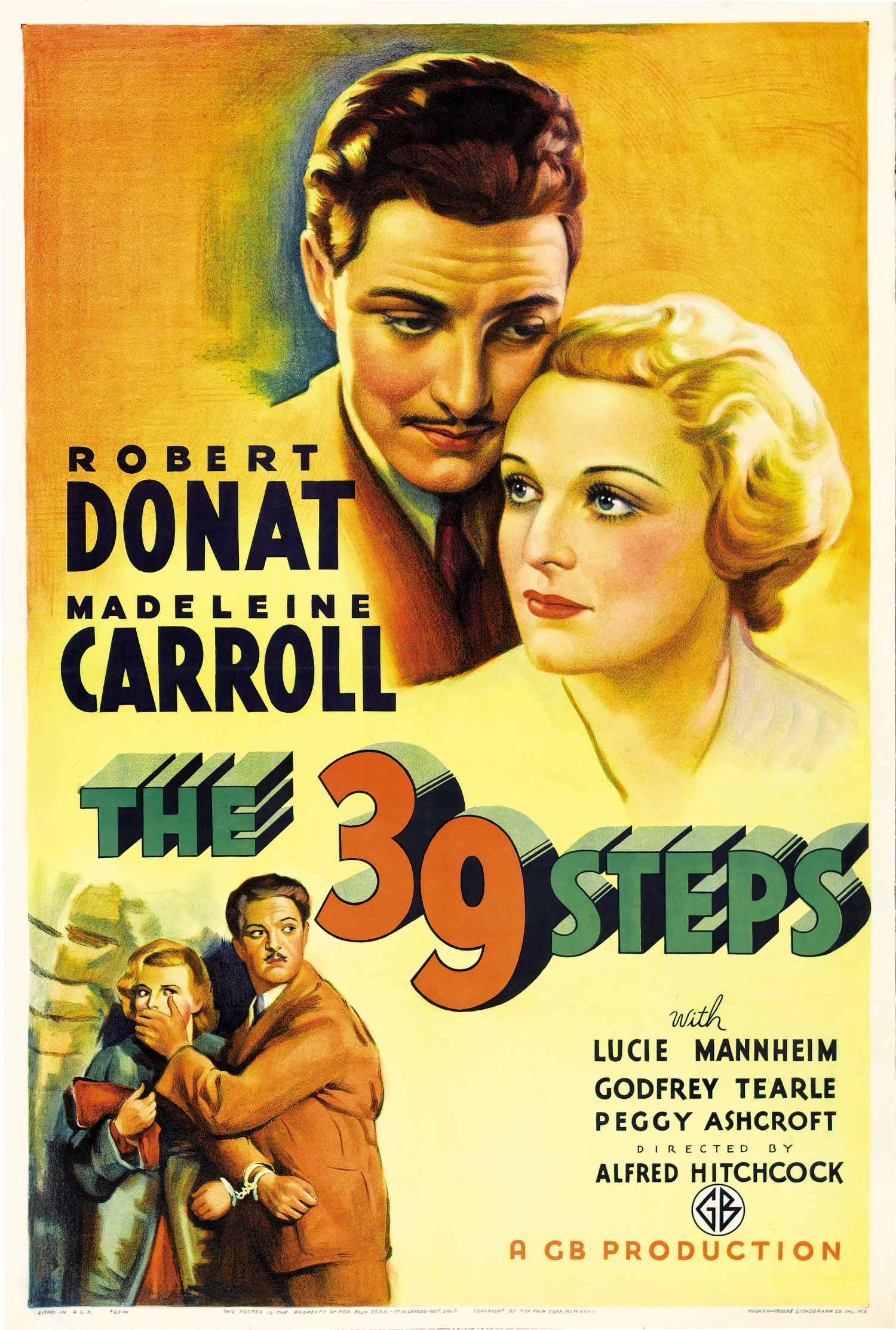
The 39 Steps directed by Alfred Hitchcock and starring Robert Donat and Madeleine Carroll.

== A-K ==
Title	Director	Cast	Genre	Notes
18 Minutes	Monty Banks	Gregory Ratoff, John Loder, Benita Hume	Comedy	
The 39 Steps	Alfred Hitchcock	Robert Donat, Madeleine Carroll, Lucie Mannheim	Mystery	Number 4 in the list of BFI Top 100 British films
Abdul the Damned	Karl Grune	Fritz Kortner, Nils Asther, Adrienne Ames	Drama	
The Ace of Spades	George Pearson	Michael Hogan, Dorothy Boyd, Richard Cooper	Drama	
Admirals All	Victor Hanbury	Wynne Gibson, Gordon Harker, Anthony Bushell	Comedy	
Adventure Ltd.	George King	Sebastian Shaw, Pearl Argyle, Clifford Heatherley	Adventure	
Alibi Inn	Walter Tennyson	Molly Lamont, Ben Welden, Olive Sloane	Drama	
All at Sea	Anthony Kimmins	Tyrell Davis, Googie Withers, Rex Harrison	Comedy	
Annie, Leave the Room!	Leslie S. Hiscott	Morton Selten, Eva Moore, Jane Carr	Comedy	
Barnacle Bill	Harry Hughes	Archie Pitt, Joan Gardner, Gus McNaughton	Drama	
Be Careful, Mr. Smith	Max Mack	Bobbie Comber, Bertha Belmore, Cecil Ramage	Comedy	
The Big Splash	Leslie S. Hiscott	Frank Pettingell, Finlay Currie, Marguerite Allan	Comedy	
The Black Mask	Ralph Ince	Wylie Watson, Aileen Marson, Joyce Kennedy	Crime	
Blue Smoke	Ralph Ince	Tamara Desni, Bruce Seton, Hal Walters	Sports	
Boys Will Be Boys	William Beaudine	Will Hay, Gordon Harker, Norma Varden	Comedy	
Breakers Ahead	Anthony Gilkison	Barry Livesey, Roddy Hughes, Cicely Oates	Drama	
Brewster's Millions	Thornton Freeland	Jack Buchanan, Lili Damita, Nancy O'Neil	Musical comedy	
Bulldog Jack	Walter Forde	Jack Hulbert, Fay Wray, Ralph Richardson	Comedy thriller	
Can You Hear Me, Mother?	Leslie Pearce	Sandy Powell, Mary Lawson, Raymond Huntley	Comedy	
Car of Dreams	Graham Cutts, Austin Melford	John Mills, Grete Mosheim, Robertson Hare	Musical comedy	
The Case of Gabriel Perry	Albert de Courville	Henry Oscar, Olga Lindo, Margaret Lockwood	Crime	
Charing Cross Road	Albert de Courville	John Mills, June Clyde, Jean Colin	Drama	
Checkmate	George Pearson	Maurice Evans, Sally Gray, Felix Aylmer	Crime	
City of Beautiful Nonsense	Adrian Brunel	Emlyn Williams, Sophie Stewart, Eve Lister	Drama	
The Clairvoyant	Maurice Elvey	Claude Rains, Fay Wray, Jane Baxter	Drama	
Cock o' the North	Oswald Mitchell, Challis Sanderson	George Carney, Marie Lohr, Eve Lister	Musical comedy	
Come Out of the Pantry	Jack Raymond	Jack Buchanan, Fay Wray, Olive Blakeney	Musical	
Crime Unlimited	Ralph Ince	Esmond Knight, Lilli Palmer, Cecil Parker	Crime thriller	
Cross Currents	Adrian Brunel	Ian Colin, Marjorie Hume, Sally Gray	Comedy	
The Crouching Beast	Victor Hanbury	Fritz Kortner, Wynne Gibson, Andrews Engelmann	Drama	
Dandy Dick	William Beaudine	Will Hay, Nancy Burne, Davy Burnaby	Comedy	
Dance Band	Marcel Varnel	Charles "Buddy" Rogers, June Clyde, Steven Geray	Musical	
Dark World	Bernard Vorhaus	Tamara Desni, Fred Duprez, Googie Withers	Drama	
Death Drives Through	Edward L. Cahn	Chili Bouchier, Robert Douglas, Miles Mander	Sports	
Death on the Set	Leslie S. Hiscott	Henry Kendall, Eve Gray, Garry Marsh	Mystery	
Department Store	Leslie S. Hiscott	Geraldine Fitzgerald, Garry Marsh, Sebastian Shaw	Crime	
The Deputy Drummer	Lupino Lane	Kathleen Kelly, Wallace Lupino, Margaret Yarde	Comedy	
The Dictator	Victor Saville	Clive Brook, Madeleine Carroll, Emlyn Williams	Historical drama	
The Divine Spark	Carmine Gallone	Marta Eggerth, Philip Holmes, Benita Hume	Musical	
Drake of England	Arthur B. Woods	Matheson Lang, Jane Baxter Athene Seyler	Historical drama	
D'Ye Ken John Peel?	Henry Edwards	John Garrick, Winifred Shotter, Stanley Holloway	Adventure	
Emil and the Detectives	Milton Rosmer	George Hayes, Mary Glynne, George Merritt	Family	
Escape Me Never	Paul Czinner	Elisabeth Bergner, Hugh Sinclair, Griffith Jones	Drama	Bergner was nominated for an Academy Award.
Expert's Opinion	Ivar Campbell	Lucille Lisle, Leslie Perrins, Franklyn Bellamy	Thriller	
Falling in Love	Monty Banks	Charles Farrell, Mary Lawson, Gregory Ratoff	Comedy	
Father O'Flynn	Wilfred Noy, Walter Tennyson	Henry Oscar, Dorothy Vernon, Ralph Truman	Musical	
Fighting Stock	Tom Walls	Tom Walls, Robertson Hare, Ralph Lynn	Comedy	
A Fire Has Been Arranged	Leslie S. Hiscott	Chesney Allen, Bud Flanagan, Alastair Sim	Comedy	
First a Girl	Victor Saville	Jessie Matthews, Sonnie Hale, Griffith Jones	Comedy	
Flame in the Heather	Donovan Pedelty	Gwenllian Gill, Bruce Seton, Richard Hayward	Historical	
Foreign Affaires	Tom Walls	Tom Walls, Robertson Hare, Cecil Parker	Comedy	
Forever England	Walter Forde, Anthony Asquith	Betty Balfour, John Mills, Barry MacKay	World War I	
Full Circle	George King	René Ray, Garry Marsh, Margaret Yarde	Crime	
Gay Old Dog	George King	Edward Rigby, Moore Marriott, Marguerite Allan	Comedy	
Gentlemen's Agreement	George Pearson	Vivien Leigh, Frederick Peisley, Anthony Holles	Drama	
Get Off My Foot	William Beaudine	Max Miller, Chili Bouchier, Jane Carr	Comedy	
The Ghost Goes West	René Clair	Robert Donat, Jean Parker, Eugene Pallette	Comedy	
The Girl in the Crowd	Michael Powell	Patricia Hilliard, Googie Withers, Harold French	Comedy	
The Guv'nor	Milton Rosmer	George Arliss, Gene Gerrard, Viola Keats	Comedy	
Handle with Care	Randall Faye	Molly Lamont, Jack Hobbs, James Finlayson	Comedy	
Heart's Desire	Paul L. Stein	Richard Tauber, Leonora Corbett, Carl Harbord	Musical drama	
Heat Wave	Maurice Elvey	Albert Burdon, Cyril Maude, Anna Lee	Comedy	
Hello, Sweetheart	Monty Banks	Claude Hulbert, Gregory Ratoff, Jane Carr	Comedy	
Her Last Affaire	Michael Powell	Hugh Williams, Viola Keats, Francis L. Sullivan	Drama	
His Majesty and Company	Anthony Kimmins	John Garrick, Morton Selten, Barbara Waring	Musical	
Honeymoon for Three	Leo Mittler	Stanley Lupino, Aileen Marson, Jack Melford	Comedy	
Honours Easy	Herbert Brenon	Greta Nissen, Patric Knowles, Margaret Lockwood	Drama	
Hyde Park Corner	Sinclair Hill	Gordon Harker, Binnie Hale, Jack Melford	Drama	
I Give My Heart	Marcel Varnel	Gitta Alpár, Owen Nares, Margaret Bannerman	Musical	
Immortal Gentleman	Widgey R. Newman	Basil Gill, Rosalinde Fuller, Dennis Hoey	Drama	
In Town Tonight	Herbert Smith	Jack Barty, Stanley Holloway, Finlay Currie	Musical	
Inside the Room	Leslie S. Hiscott	Austin Trevor, Dorothy Boyd, Garry Marsh	Mystery	
The Invader	Adrian Brunel	Buster Keaton, Lupita Tovar, Lyn Harding	Comedy	
Invitation to the Waltz	Paul Merzbach	Lilian Harvey, Carl Esmond, Esme Percy	Musical	
It Happened in Paris	Carol Reed, Robert Wyler	John Loder, Nancy Burne, Dorothy Boyd	Comedy	
It's a Bet	Alexander Esway	Gene Gerrard, Helen Chandler, Judy Kelly	Comedy drama	
Jimmy Boy	John Baxter	Jimmy O'Dea, Guy Middleton, Enid Stamp Taylor	Comedy	
Joy Ride	Harry Hughes	Gene Gerrard, Zelma O'Neal, Betty Ann Davies	Drama	
Jubilee Window	George Pearson	Sebastian Shaw, Ralph Truman, Margaret Yarde	Comedy	
Key to Harmony	Norman Walker	Belle Chrystall, Reginald Purdell, Olive Sloane	Drama	
King of the Damned	Walter Forde	Conrad Veidt, Helen Vinson, Noah Beery	Action	
Koenigsmark	Maurice Tourneur	Elissa Landi, Pierre Fresnay, John Lodge	Adventure	

== L-Z ==
Title	Director	Cast	Genre	Notes
The Lad	Henry Edwards	Gordon Harker, Betty Stockfeld, Jane Carr	Comedy	
Late Extra	Albert Parker	James Mason, Virginia Cherrill, Alastair Sim	Crime	
Lazybones	Michael Powell	Ian Hunter, Claire Luce, Sara Allgood	Comedy	
Lend Me Your Husband	Frederick Hayward	John Stuart, Nora Swinburne, Nancy Burne	Comedy	
Lend Me Your Wife	W. P. Kellino	Henry Kendall, Kathleen Kelly, Hal Gordon	Comedy	
Lieutenant Daring R.N.	Reginald Denham	Hugh Williams, Geraldine Fitzgerald, Frederick Lloyd	Adventure	
Line Engaged	Bernard Mainwaring	Bramwell Fletcher, Jane Baxter, Arthur Wontner	Thriller	
A Little Bit of Bluff	Maclean Rogers	Reginald Gardiner, H. F. Maltby, Peggy Novak	Comedy	
Look Up and Laugh	Basil Dean	Gracie Fields, Alfred Drayton, Vivien Leigh	Comedy	
The Love Test	Michael Powell	Judy Gunn, Louis Hayward, Googie Withers	Comedy	
Lucky Days	Reginald Denham	Chili Bouchier, Leslie Perrins, Ronald Simpson	Comedy	
The Mad Hatters	Ivar Campbell	Chili Bouchier, Kim Peacock, Vera Bogetti	Comedy	
Man of the Moment	Monty Banks	Douglas Fairbanks Jr., Laura La Plante, Claude Hulbert	Comedy	
The Man Without a Face	George King	Moore Marriott, Ben Williams, Vi Kaley	Drama	
Maria Marten	Milton Rosmer	Tod Slaughter, Eric Portman, Sophie Stewart	Horror	Based on the Red Barn Murder
Marry the Girl	Maclean Rogers	Sonnie Hale, Winifred Shotter, Judy Kelly	Comedy	
McGlusky the Sea Rover	Walter Summers	Jack Doyle, Tamara Desni, Henry Mollison	Adventure	
Me and Marlborough	Victor Saville	Cicely Courtneidge, Tom Walls, Barry MacKay	Comedy	
Midshipman Easy	Carol Reed	Hughie Green, Margaret Lockwood, Harry Tate	Adventure	
Mimi	Paul L. Stein	Douglas Fairbanks Jr., Gertrude Lawrence, Carol Goodner	Romance	
The Morals of Marcus	Miles Mander	Lupe Vélez, Ian Hunter, Adrianne Allen	Comedy	
Moscow Nights	Anthony Asquith	Harry Baur, Laurence Olivier, Penelope Dudley-Ward	Drama	
Mr. Cohen Takes a Walk	William Beaudine	Paul Graetz, Chili Bouchier, Violet Farebrother	Comedy	
Mr. What's-His-Name?	Ralph Ince	Seymour Hicks, Olive Blakeney, Enid Stamp-Taylor	Comedy	
Music Hath Charms	Thomas Bentley	Henry Hall, Carol Goodner, Arthur Margetson	Musical	
My Heart Is Calling	Carmine Gallone	Jan Kiepura, Mártha Eggerth, Sonnie Hale	Musical	
The Mystery of the Mary Celeste	Denison Clift	Bela Lugosi, Shirley Grey, Arthur Margetson	Mystery	
Night Mail	Herbert Smith	Henry Oscar, Jane Carr, Garry Marsh	Thriller	
The Night of the Party	Michael Powell	Leslie Banks, Ian Hunter, Jane Baxter	Mystery	
No Limit	Monty Banks	George Formby, Florence Desmond, Edward Rigby	Comedy	
No Monkey Business	Marcel Varnel	Gene Gerrard, June Clyde, Renée Houston	Comedy	
Off the Dole	Arthur Mertz	George Formby, Beryl Ingham, Constance Shotter	Comedy	
Oh, Daddy!	Graham Cutts, Austin Melford	Leslie Henson, Robertson Hare, Frances Day	Comedy	
Oh, What a Night	Frank Richardson	Molly Lamont, Valerie Hobson, James Carew	Comedy	
Old Faithful	Maclean Rogers	Horace Hodges, Glennis Lorimer, Wally Patch	Drama	
Old Roses	Bernard Mainwaring	Horace Hodges, Nancy Burne, Bruce Lester	Crime	
Once a Thief	George Pearson	John Stuart, Nancy Burne, Lewis Shaw	Crime	
Once in a New Moon	Anthony Kimmins	Eliot Makeham, René Ray, Morton Selten	Sci-fi	
The Passing of the Third Floor Back	Berthold Viertel	Conrad Veidt, Anna Lee, René Ray	Drama	
Peg of Old Drury	Herbert Wilcox	Anna Neagle, Cedric Hardwicke, Margaretta Scott	Biopic	
The Phantom Light	Michael Powell	Binnie Hale, Gordon Harker, Ian Hunter	Thriller	
Play Up the Band	Harry Hughes	Stanley Holloway, Betty Ann Davies, Hal Gordon	Comedy	
The Price of a Song	Michael Powell	Campbell Gullan, Marjorie Corbett, Felix Aylmer	Crime	
The Price of Wisdom	Reginald Denham	Mary Jerrold, Roger Livesey, Lilian Oldland	Drama	
The Private Secretary	Henry Edwards	Edward Everett Horton, Barry MacKay, Judy Gunn	Comedy	
The Public Life of Henry the Ninth	Bernard Mainwaring	Leonard Henry, George Mozart, Wally Patch	Comedy	
Radio Pirates	Ivar Campbell	Leslie French, Mary Lawson, Enid Stamp-Taylor	Musical	
A Real Bloke	John Baxter	George Carney, Mary Clare, Diana Beaumont	Drama	
The Right Age to Marry	Maclean Rogers	Frank Pettingell, Joyce Bland, Moira Lynd	Comedy	
The River House Mystery	Fraser Foulsham	G. H. Mulcaster, Bernard Lee, Roddy Hughes	Crime	
The Riverside Murder	Albert Parker	Basil Sydney, Judy Gunn, Alastair Sim	Crime	
The Rocks of Valpre	Henry Edwards	John Garrick, Winifred Shotter, Leslie Perrins	Crime	
Rolling Home	Ralph Ince	Will Fyffe, Molly Lamont, Ruth Maitland	Comedy	
Royal Cavalcade	Multiple directors	John Mills, Jane Baxter, Owen Nares	Portmanteau drama	
Sanders of the River	Zoltan Korda	Leslie Banks, Paul Robeson, Orlando Martins	Adventure	
Say It with Diamonds	Redd Davis	Frank Pettingell, Vera Bogetti, Gerald Rawlinson	Comedy	
School for Stars	Donovan Pedelty	Fred Conyngham, Jean Gillie, Torin Thatcher	Romance	
Scrooge	Henry Edwards	Seymour Hicks, Donald Calthrop, Mary Glynne	Drama	
Sexton Blake and the Bearded Doctor	George A. Cooper	George Curzon, Henry Oscar, John Turnbull	Mystery	
Sexton Blake and the Mademoiselle	Alex Bryce	George Curzon, Raymond Lovell, Ian Fleming	Mystery	
She Shall Have Music	Leslie S. Hiscott	Jack Hylton, June Clyde, Gwen Farrar	Musical	
The Silent Passenger	Reginald Denham	Peter Haddon, John Loder, Austin Trevor	Crime	
Smith's Wives	Manning Haynes	Ernie Lotinga, Kay Walsh, Tyrrell Davis	Comedy	
So You Won't Talk	William Beaudine	Monty Banks, Vera Pearce, Enid Stamp-Taylor	Comedy	
Someday	Michael Powell	Esmond Knight, Margaret Lockwood, Raymond Lovell	Romance	
Squibs	Henry Edwards	Betty Balfour, Gordon Harker, Stanley Holloway	Musical	
The Stoker	Leslie Pearce	Leslie Fuller, Phyllis Clare, Georgie Harris	Comedy	
Stormy Weather	Tom Walls	Tom Walls, Ralph Lynn, Robertson Hare	Comedy	
Street Song	Bernard Vorhaus	John Garrick, René Ray, Wally Patch	Musical	
Strictly Illegal	Ralph Cedar	Leslie Fuller, Betty Astell, Glennis Lorimer	Comedy	
The Student's Romance	Otto Kanturek	Grete Natzler, Patric Knowles, Carol Goodner	Musical	
Ten Minute Alibi	Bernard Vorhaus	Phillips Holmes, Aileen Marson, Theo Shall	Crime	
That's My Uncle	George Pearson	Richard Cooper, Betty Astell, Mark Daly	Comedy	
Things Are Looking Up	Albert de Courville	Cicely Courtneidge, Max Miller, Mary Lawson	Comedy	
Three Witnesses	Leslie S. Hiscott	Henry Kendall, Eve Gray, Sebastian Shaw	Crime	
The Triumph of Sherlock Holmes	Leslie S. Hiscott	Arthur Wontner, Ian Fleming, Jane Carr	Mystery	
Trust the Navy	Lupino Lane	Nancy Burne, Guy Middleton, Wallace Lupino	Comedy	
The Tunnel	Maurice Elvey	Richard Dix, Leslie Banks, Madge Evans	Science fiction	
Turn of the Tide	Norman Walker	John Garrick, Geraldine Fitzgerald, Wilfrid Lawson	Drama	
Two Hearts in Harmony	William Beaudine	Bernice Claire, George Curzon, Enid Stamp-Taylor	Comedy drama	
Vanity	Adrian Brunel	Jane Cain, Percy Marmont, Moira Lynd	Comedy	
Variety	Adrian Brunel	George Carney, Barry Livesey, Jack Livesey	Musical	
The Village Squire	Reginald Denham	Leslie Perrins, Vivien Leigh, Moira Lynd	Comedy	Leigh's film debut
Vintage Wine	Henry Edwards	Seymour Hicks, Claire Luce, Judy Gunn	Comedy	
Where's George?	Jack Raymond	Sydney Howard, Frank Pettingell, Sam Livesey	Comedy	
While Parents Sleep	Adrian Brunel	Jean Gillie, Enid Stamp Taylor, Romilly Lunge	Comedy	
White Lilac	Albert Parker	Basil Sydney, Judy Gunn, Percy Marmont	Mystery	
Who's Your Father	Lupino Lane	Lupino Lane, Peter Haddon, Jean Kent	Comedy	
Widow's Might	Cyril Gardner	Laura La Plante, Yvonne Arnaud, Garry Marsh	Comedy	
Windfall	George King	Edward Rigby, Marie Ault, George Carney	Drama	

== Documentary ==
Title	Director	Cast	Genre	Notes
R.A.F.	John Betts		Documentary	

== See also ==
- 1935 in British music
- 1935 in British television
- 1935 in the United Kingdom

== Bibliography ==
- Chibnall, Steve. Quota Quickies: The Birth of the British 'B' Film. British Film Institute, 2007.
- Low, Rachael. Filmmaking in 1930s Britain. George Allen & Unwin, 1985.
- Wood, Linda. British Films, 1927-1939. British Film Institute, 1986.
