= 1935 in British music =

This is a summary of 1935 in music in the United Kingdom.

== Events ==
- February – At the suggestion of Frank Bridge, Benjamin Britten is invited to a job interview by the BBC's director of music Adrian Boult and his assistant Edward Clark.
- 12 March – Jack Hylton makes his first recording since leaving the Decca label, for His Master's Voice.
- 19 November – The first performance in England of Shostakovich's Symphony No 1 takes place at the Proms, by the BBC Symphony Orchestra, conductor Henry Wood.
- 19 November – Kathleen Ferrier marries Albert Wilson; the marriage is never consummated.
- date unknown – Michael Tippett joins the British Communist Party.

== Popular music ==
- "Fanlight Fanny", words & music by George Formby, Harry Gifford and Frederick E. Cliffe
- "Men About Town", words & music by Noël Coward
- "Mrs Worthington", words & music by Noël Coward
- "The Canoe Song", by Mischa Spoliansky (sung by Paul Robeson in the film Sanders of the River)
- "Where the Arches Used To Be", by D. O'Connor and K. Russell, performed by Flanagan and Allen
- "Who's Been Polishing The Sun", words & music by Noel Gay

== Classical music: new works ==
- Arnold Bax – Symphony No. 6
- Arthur Bliss – Music for Strings
- Sir George Dyson – Belshazzar's Feast
- Joseph Holbrooke – Aucassin and Nicolette (ballet)
- Michael Tippett – String Quartet No. 1
- William Walton – Symphony No. 1
- Ralph Vaughan Williams – Symphony No. 4
- Charles Williams – Majestic Fanfare

== Film and Incidental music ==
- Jack Beaver – Airport
- Benjamin Britten – God's Chillun
- Louis Levy – Hyde Park Corner
- Eric Spear – Play Up the Band
- William Trytel – The Triumph of Sherlock Holmes

== Musical theatre ==
- 25 February – Jack O'Diamonds (w. Clifford Gray & H. F. Maltby, m. Noel Gay) opens at the Gaiety Theatre; it later transfers to the Cambridge Theatre and runs for 126 performances in all.
- 2 May – Glamorous Night (w. Christopher Hassall m. Ivor Novello) opens at the Theatre Royal, Drury Lane, and runs for 243 performances.

== Musical films ==
- Be Careful, Mr Smith, starring Bobbie Comber
- Brewster's Millions, directed by Thornton Freeland, starring Jack Buchanan and Lili Damita
- Come Out of the Pantry, directed by Jack Raymond, starring Jack Buchanan, Fay Wray and James Carew
- The Divine Spark, directed by Carmine Gallone, starring Marta Eggerth and Philip Holmes
- Heart's Desire, directed by Paul L. Stein, starring Richard Tauber and Leonora Corbett
- In Town Tonight, directed by Herbert Smith, starring Jack Barty and Stanley Holloway
- Music Hath Charms, directed by Thomas Bentley, starring Henry Hall and Carol Goodner
- Radio Pirates, directed by Ivar Campbell, starring Leslie French and Mary Lawson
- Variety, directed by Adrian Brunel, starring George Carney and Barry Livesey

== Births ==
- 5 February – Alex Harvey, Scottish rock singer (died 1982)
- 27 February – Alberto Remedios, operatic tenor (died 2016)
- 4 March – Nancy Whiskey, née Wilson, Scottish folk singer (died 2003)
- 29 March
  - Delme Bryn-Jones, operatic baritone (died 2001)
  - Ruby Murray, Northern Ireland-born pop singer (died 1996)
- 5 April – Peter Grant, music manager (Led Zeppelin) (died 1995)
- 10 April – Tony Zemaitis, guitar maker (died 2002)
- 19 April – Dudley Moore, comedy writer-performer, composer and jazz pianist (died 2002)
- 27 May – Mal Evans, roadie (The Beatles) (killed 1976)
- 28 May – Richard Van Allen, operatic bass (died 2008)
- 5 July – Shirley Collins, folk singer
- 12 July – Barry Mason, songwriter (died 2021)
- 24 July – Les Reed, songwriter and light orchestra leader (died 2019)
- 15 August – Jim Dale, actor and singer-songwriter
- 16 September – Robin Field, composer
- 1 October – Julie Andrews, née Wells, musical performer
- 17 October – Michael Eavis, music promoter (Glastonbury Festival) and dairy farmer
- 20 October – Roy Bailey, folk singer (died 2018)
- 21 October – Derek Bell, Northern Ireland-born harpist and composer (died 2002)
- 4 November – Elgar Howarth, conductor and composer (died 2025)
- 5 November – Nicholas Maw, composer (died 2009)
- 23 December – Johnny Kidd, singer (died 1966)

== Deaths ==
- 3 March – Caradog Roberts, composer, 56
- 17 March – Mary Grant Carmichael, pianist and composer, 83
- 17 April – Templar Saxe, actor and singer, 69
- 28 April – Sir Alexander Campbell Mackenzie, composer, 87
- 3 May – Charles Manners, operatic bass and opera manager, 77
- 19 July – Philip Napier Miles, philanthropist, music patron and composer, 70
- 2 September – Isidore de Lara, singer and composer, 77
- 27 September – Alan Gray, organist and composer, 79
- 6 October – Frederic Hymen Cowen, pianist, conductor and composer, 83

== See also ==
- 1935 in British television
- 1935 in the United Kingdom
- List of British films of 1935
