= 1935 in the United Kingdom =

Events from the year 1935 in the United Kingdom. This year was the Silver Jubilee of King George V. Political events included a general election in November and changes in the leadership of both the Conservative and Labour parties.

== Incumbents ==
- Monarch – George V
- Prime Minister - Ramsay MacDonald (Coalition) (until 7 June), Stanley Baldwin (Coalition) (starting 7 June)

== Events ==
- 1 January – Ramblers' Association founded.
- 21 February – the Rolls-Royce Merlin aircraft engine is first flown, at Hucknall Aerodrome.
- 26 February – Robert Watson-Watt first demonstrates the use of radar, at Daventry.
- 2 March – King Prajadhipok (Rama VII) of Siam abdicates and flees with his wife Rambai Barni to England.
- 6 March – Croydon Aerodrome robbery: £21,000 worth of gold is stolen and never recovered.
- 12 March – speed limit in built-up areas reduced to 30 mph.
- 18 March – Britain protests at Germany's introduction of conscription.
- April – reflective cat's-eyes first used on British roads.
- 6 May – The British Empire holds silver jubilee celebrations for King George V.
- 11 May – Ewart Astill captains Leicestershire County Cricket Club for the remainder of the season, the first professional cricketer to lead any county on a regular basis since the 19th century.
- 13 May – Arabist, historian and war hero T. E. Lawrence, known as Lawrence of Arabia, is involved in a serious accident while riding his motorcycle near Clouds Hill, his home in Dorset; he dies of his injuries on 19 May, aged 46.
- 14 May – Northamptonshire County Cricket Club gains (over Somerset at Taunton by 48 runs) what proves to be their last victory for 99 matches, easily a record in the County Championship. Their next Championship win will not be until 29 May 1939.
- 19 May – canonization of Cardinal John Fisher and Sir Thomas More by Pope Pius XI. This year also, Bede is sanctified by the Catholic Church.
- 21 May – the funeral of T. E. Lawrence is held at St Nicholas' Church, Moreton in Dorset. Winston Churchill, E. M. Forster, Lady Astor and King Ghazi of Iraq attend.
- 22 May – the government announces plans to triple the size of the Royal Air Force in the next two years, partly in response to German re-armament.
- 23 May – Woolmington v DPP, a landmark case decided on appeal in the House of Lords, reaffirms the presumption of innocence as the "golden thread" in criminal law.
- 1 June – the driving test becomes compulsory.
- 6 June – Alfred Hitchcock's film of The 39 Steps released in the UK.
- 7 June – Ramsay MacDonald retires; Stanley Baldwin takes over as prime minister.
- 18 June – Anglo-German Naval Agreement: Britain agrees to a German navy equal to 35% of her own naval tonnage.
- 29 June – first portion of Swanscombe skull, belonging to a woman from 400,000 years past, is discovered in north Kent.
- 12 July – rioting breaks out in Belfast following Orange parades; by the end of August eight Protestants and five Catholics have been killed, hundreds injured and over 2,000 homes destroyed (almost all Catholic).
- 13 July – official completion of the London County Council's Becontree estate in East London, the largest housing estate in the world, consisting of some 27,000 new council houses which are home to more than 100,000 people. The first families moved to the estate, which straddles the borders of Dagenham, Barking and Ilford, in 1921.
- 29 July – T. E. Lawrence's Seven Pillars of Wisdom is first published in an edition for general circulation, two months after his death resulting from a motorcycle accident.
- 30 July – Allen Lane founds Penguin Books to publish the first mass market paperbacks in Britain.
- 17–24 August – the Deaflympics take place in London.
- 18 August – last service held in Mardale church in the Lake District prior to the village's flooding to create Manchester Corporation's Haweswater Reservoir.
- 3 September – Malcolm Campbell breaks the 300 mph barrier for the first time and sets a new land speed record of 301.337 mph (484.955 km/h) at the Bonneville Salt Flats, Utah, driving the Campbell-Railton Blue Bird.
- 11 September – Bahram completes the English Triple Crown by finishing first in the 2,000 Guineas, Epsom Derby and St Leger.
- 12 September – an underground explosion at North Gawber (Lidgett) colliery, Barnsley, South Yorkshire, kills nineteen.
- 30 September – the London and North Eastern Railway begins to run the Silver Jubilee train between London King's Cross and Newcastle, Britain's first streamliner, using Nigel Gresley's LNER Class A4 steam locomotives.
- October – first steel produced from new works at Corby.
- 8 October – Clement Attlee is appointed as interim leader of the Labour Party in succession to George Lansbury who has resigned due to a wish to maintain his Christian pacifist principles.
- 21 October – Grant v Australian Knitting Mills, a landmark case in consumer law, decided on appeal in the Judicial Committee of the Privy Council.
- 4 November – opening of Hornsey Town Hall, London, designed by Reginald Uren, the first major UK building in the International Style.
- 6 November – maiden flight of the Royal Air Force's Hawker Hurricane fighter aircraft, at Brooklands.
- 14 November – in the general election, Prime Minister Stanley Baldwin is returned to office at the head of a National Government led by the Conservative Party with a large but reduced majority. This election begins the modern tradition of the Speaker of the House of Commons seeking re-election as such rather than under a party label. There will be no further general election for 10 years.
- 26 November
  - In the Labour Party leadership election, Clement Attlee is confirmed as leader.
  - Release of Scrooge, the first all-talking full-length film version of Charles Dickens' A Christmas Carol, with Sir Seymour Hicks in the title rôle.
- 10 December
  - James Chadwick wins the Nobel Prize in Physics "for the discovery of the neutron."
  - 1935 SABENA Savoia-Marchetti S.73 crash at Tatsfield: all eleven on board the flight are killed.
- 12 December – opening of The De La Warr Pavilion at Bexhill on Sea in East Sussex, designed by Erich Mendelsohn and Serge Chermayeff in the International style.
- 18 December – Samuel Hoare resigns as foreign secretary; replaced by Anthony Eden.
- Undated – Rowntree's of York produce their first Chocolate Crisp bars, which will in 1937 be renamed Kit Kat.

== Publications ==
- Enid Bagnold's novel National Velvet.
- Agatha Christie's Hercule Poirot novels Three Act Tragedy and Death in the Clouds.
- Graham Greene's novel England Made Me.
- Georgette Heyer's Regency romance Regency Buck.
- Christopher Isherwood's novel Mr Norris Changes Trains.
- John Masefield's children's fantasy The Box of Delights.
- George Orwell's novel A Clergyman's Daughter.
- Marion Richardson's teaching guides Writing and Writing Patterns.
- Dorothy L. Sayers' Lord Peter Wimsey novel Gaudy Night.
- Caroline Spurgeon's study Shakespeare's Imagery, and what it tells us.
- P. G. Wodehouse's short story collection Blandings Castle and Elsewhere.

== Births ==
- 2 January
  - Ray Byrom, English footballer (died 2020)
  - David McKee, writer and illustrator (died 2022)
- 3 January – David Vine, television presenter (died 2009)
- 11 January – Melvyn Hayes, actor
- 18 January – Jon Stallworthy, poet (died 2014)
- 19 January
  - Robin Birley, archaeologist (died 2018)
  - Bryan Pringle, actor (died 2002)
- 21 January – Andrew Sinclair, polymath (died 2019)
- 24 January
  - Eric Ashton, English rugby league footballer (died 2008)
  - Bamber Gascoigne, broadcaster and author (died 2022)
- 25 January – J. G. Farrell, novelist (died 1979)
- 27 January
  - Gillian Beer, academic and critic
  - D. M. Thomas, novelist, poet and translator (died 2023)
- 28 January – David Lodge, novelist (died 2025)
- 30 January – Stuart Wheeler, financier and political activist (died 2020)
- 3 February – Jeremy Kemp, actor (died 2019)
- 5 February – Alex Harvey, Scottish rock musician (died 1982)
- 7 February – Cliff Jones, Welsh footballer
- 9 February
  - Paul Flynn, politician (died 2019)
  - Roger Needham, computer scientist (died 2003)
- 11 February – Delena Kidd, actress
- 16 February – Brian Bedford, actor (died 2016)
- 17 February – Christina Pickles, actress
- 21 February – Mark McManus, Scottish actor (died 1994)
- 25 February – David Wilde, pianist and composer (died 2025)
- 27 February – Anne Treisman, psychologist (died 2018)
- 3 March – George Gardiner, politician (died 2002)
- 7 March – Michael Hopkins, architect (died 2023)
- 10 March – Peter Rolfe Vaughan, engineer (died 2008)
- 13 March – David Nobbs, comic writer (died 2015)
- 21 March – Brian Clough, footballer and football manager (died 2004)
- 23 March – Barry Cryer, comedy writer and performer (died 2022)
- 24 March – Mary Berry, food writer and television presenter
- 25 March – Susan Engel, actress
- 27 March
  - Sir Angus Farquharson of Finzean, aristocrat and public servant (died 2018)
  - Julian Glover, actor
- 28 March
  - Frank Judd, politician (died 2021)
  - Michael Parkinson, journalist and television presenter (died 2023)
- 29 March – Ruby Murray, Northern Irish singer (died 1996)
- 5 April
  - Donald Lynden-Bell, astrophysicist (died 2018)
  - Guy Lyon Playfair, writer (died 2018)
- 10 April – Tony Zemaitis, guitar maker (died 2002)
- 13 April – Peter Moran, Roman Catholic prelate (died 2026)
- 14 April – Terrance Dicks, television writer (died 2019)
- 15 April – Alan Plater, playwright and screenwriter (died 2010)
- 19 April – Dudley Moore, comedian, actor and musician (died 2002)
- 20 April – Gary Raymond, actor
- 29 April – April Ashley, transgender model (died 2021)
- 5 May – Eddie Linden, poet (died 2023)
- 7 May – Michael Hopkins, architect (died 2023)
- 8 May – Jack Charlton, footballer (died 2020)
- 9 May – Roger Hargreaves, children's author (died 1988)
- 11 May – Chris Perrins, English biologist, ornithologist and academic
- 13 May – Stella Rimington, Director General of MI5 (died 2025)
- 14 May – Mel Charles, Welsh footballer (died 2016)
- 17 May – Dennis Potter, writer (died 1994)
- 23 May
  - Juliet Campbell, née Collings, diplomat and academic administrator
  - Julian Grenfell, 3rd Baron Grenfell, politician
- 27 May – Roger Owen, British historian (died 2018)
- 28 May
  - Anne Reid, actress
  - Richard Van Allen, opera singer (died 2008)
- 1 June – Norman Foster, architect and designer
- 2 June – Roger Brierley, actor (died 2005)
- 3 June – Raoul Franklin, physicist and academic (died 2021)
- 5 June – Anne Pashley, track and field sprinter and operatic soprano (died 2016)
- 12 June – Jane Freeman, actress (died 2017)
- 16 June – James Bolam, actor
- 17 June – Antony Maitland, children's author and illustrator (died 2025)
- 18 June – John Spencer, snooker player (died 2006)
- 19 June – Derren Nesbitt, actor
- 23 June – Keith Burkinshaw, footballer and manager
- 25 June
  - Tony Lanfranchi, racing driver (died 2004)
  - Charles Sheffield, science fiction author and physicist (died 2002)
- 27 June – Colin Bazley, bishop
- 28 June
  - Roy Faulkner, footballer
  - John Inman, comic actor (died 2007)
  - Tremayne Rodd, 3rd Baron Rennell, rugby union player (died 2006)
- 29 June
  - Jill Briscoe, British American author, editor and speaker
  - Derek Partridge, actor, television presenter, spokesman and voice-over artist
- 30 June
  - Shane Alexander, 2nd Earl Alexander of Tunis
  - Les Savill, cricketer
- 1 July – David Prowse, weightlifter and film performer (died 2020)
- 5 July – Shirley Collins, folk singer
- 7 July – Billy Russell, footballer (died 2022)
- 9 July – Michael Williams, actor (died 2001)
- 11 July – Oliver Napier, politician (died 2011)
- 15 July – William G. Stewart, television producer and presenter (died 2017)
- 19 July – David Parry-Evans, Royal Air Force commander (died 2020)
- 20 July
  - Peter Palumbo, Baron Palumbo, real estate developer, art collector and connoisseur of architecture
  - Ted Rogers, comedian (died 2001)
- 24 July – Les Reed, songwriter (died 2019)
- 27 July – Billy McCullough, footballer (died 2026)
- 28 July – Simon Dee, television presenter (died 2009)
- 5 August – Wanda Ventham, actress
- 10 August – Ian Stewart, Baron Stewartby, politician and numismatist (died 2018)
- 13 August – Rod Hull, entertainer (died 1999)
- 15 August – Jim Dale, actor and singer
- 27 August – Michael Holroyd, biographer
- 5 September – Johnny Briggs, actor (died 2021)
- 6 September – Jock Wallace Jr., Scottish football player and manager (died 1996)
- 18 September – John Spencer, English snooker player (died 2006)
- 20 September – Keith Roberts, science fiction writer (died 2000)
- 21 September – Jimmy Armfield, footballer (died 2018)
- 28 September
  - Ronald Lacey, English actor (d. 1991)
  - Alan Shepherd, motorcycle racer (died 2007)
- 29 September
  - David Daker, actor
  - Bruce Tulloh, long-distance runner (died 2018)
- 30 September – Janet Reger, née Chabinsky, lingerie designer (died 2005)
- 1 October – Julie Andrews, born Julia Wells, singer and actress
- 9 October
  - Prince Edward, Duke of Kent
  - Don McCullin, photojournalist
- 10 October – Judith Chalmers, television presenter (died 2026)
- 13 October – Michael Heath, cartoonist
- 17 October – Michael Eavis, founder of Glastonbury Festival
- 20 October – Roy Bailey, folk singer (died 2018)
- 30 October – Michael Winner, film director (died 2013)
- 31 October – David Harvey, economic geographer
- 2 November
  - Lucy Barfield, godchild of C. S. Lewis and inspiration for Lucy Pevensie in The Chronicles of Narnia (died 2003)
  - Peter Seabrook, gardening writer and broadcaster (died 2022)
- 4 November – Elgar Howarth, conductor and composer (died 2025)
- 5 November
  - David Battley, actor (died 2003)
  - Nicholas Maw, composer (died 2009)
  - Lester Piggott, jockey (died 2022)
- 11 November – Arnold Whittall, musicologist (died 2026)
- 12 November – William Tallon, Steward and Page of the Backstairs (died 2007)
- 13 November – George Carey, Archbishop of Canterbury
- 14 November – Michael Busselle, photographer and author (died 2006)
- 15 November – Gillian Reynolds, radio critic
- 18 November – Rodney Hall, English-born Australian author and poet
- 20 November – Bridget Jones, literary academic (died 2000)
- 27 November – Verity Lambert, television producer (died 2007)
- 29 November – Amanda Walker, actress
- 10 December – Terry Allcock, footballer and cricketer (died 2024)
- 14 December – Anthony Wilden, author and social theorist, translator of Jaques Lacan (died 2019)
- 15 December – Jim Iley, football player and manager (died 2018)
- 18 December
  - Brian Bamford, golfer (died 2021)
  - Caroline, Countess of Cranbrook, aristocrat and food quality campaigner
  - Rosemary Leach, actress (died 2017)
- 23 December – Johnny Kidd, English rock and roll singer-songwriter (died 1966)
- 29 December – Jean Denton, politician and racing driver (died 2001)

== Deaths ==
- 7 February – Lewis Grassic Gibbon, Scottish-born writer; peritonitis (born 1901)
- 15 February – Basil Hall Chamberlain, Japanologist (born 1850)
- 28 February – Sir Arthur Lowes Dickinson, accountant (born 1859)
- 12 March – Sir Malcolm Smith, politician (born 1856)
- 16 March – John Macleod, Scottish physician and physiologist, recipient of the Nobel Prize in Physiology or Medicine (born 1876)
- 27 March – Francis Rattenbury, architect; murdered (born 1867)
- 5 April – Basil Champneys, architect (born 1842)
- 20 April – Lucy, Lady Duff-Gordon, fashion designer (born 1863)
- 18 May – T. E. Lawrence ("Lawrence of Arabia"), soldier; motorcycle accident (born 1888)
- 6 June – George Grossmith, Jr., musical comedy performer and producer (born 1874)
- 21 August – John Hartley, tennis player, double winner of Wimbledon (born 1849)
- 28 September – William Kennedy Dickson, cinematographic pioneer (born 1860)
- 29 September – Winifred Holtby, novelist and journalist (born 1898)
- 20 October – Arthur Henderson, Scottish-born politician, recipient of the Nobel Peace Prize (born 1863)
- 20 November – John Jellicoe, 1st Earl Jellicoe, admiral (born 1859)
- 3 December – Princess Victoria, daughter of King Edward VII (born 1868)
- 10 December
  - Sir John Carden, 6th Baronet, tank and vehicle designer (born 1892)
  - Sir Alfred Sharpe, colonial governor (b. 1853)
- 16 December – Percy Gilchrist, industrialist (b. 1851)
- 30 December – Rufus Isaacs, 1st Marquess of Reading, politician and judge (b. 1860)

== See also ==
- List of British films of 1935
