= Underneath the Arches =

Underneath the Arches may refer to:

- "Underneath the Arches" (song), a 1932 popular song co-written by Bud Flanagan, a member of The Crazy Gang
- Underneath the Arches (film), a 1937 British comedy starring The Crazy Gang
- Underneath the Arches (musical), a 1981 musical about The Crazy Gang
- Underneath the Arches (documentary), a 1970s British radio documentary about homelessness
