= The Flying Fifty-Five =

The Flying Fifty-Five may refer to:

- The Flying Fifty-Five (novel), a 1922 novel
- The Flying Fifty-Five (1924 film), a British silent sports film
- Flying Fifty-Five, a 1939 British sports drama film
