= Umbrella Man =

Umbrella Man may refer to:

- Umbrella man (JFK assassination), Louie Steven Witt, a witness to the JFK assassination who was seen carrying an umbrella
- Neville Chamberlain, Prime Minister of the United Kingdom from 1937 to 1940, nicknamed "Umbrella Man" because he often carried an umbrella in public and was invariably depicted with it in cartoons - sometimes even drawn as an umbrella
- Antonio Luis Hernandez, a Puerto Rican gang member in New York City who was a cohort of Salvador Agron, the Capeman
- Robert W. Patten, an eccentric figure in Seattle's history and the cartoon figure modeled after him
- The widely reposted image of an unnamed protester, who during the 2014 Hong Kong protests, used two umbrellas to protect himself from tear gas
- Umbrella man (Minneapolis riots), an unnamed protester who was captured on video by Brad Svenson engaging in property destruction on May 27, 2020, during the George Floyd protests in Minneapolis–Saint Paul

== Arts, media, and entertainment ==
- "The Umbrella Man", a Roald Dahl short story collected in The Umbrella Man and Other Stories
- The Umbrella Man, a play by William Matthew Scott, filmed in 1937 as London by Night
- "The Umbrella Man" (song), a song by Flanagan and Allen
- "Umbrella Man", a song by the Partridge Family, from the album Up to Date
- Allow Me, also known as Umbrella Man, a bronze sculpture by John Seward Johnson II
