= Bridget Jones (disambiguation) =

Bridget Jones is a fictional character created by Helen Fielding.

Bridget or Bridgette Jones may also refer to:

- Bridget Jones (film series), a British-American romantic comedy film series
- Bridget Jones (academic) (1935–2000), British scholar of Caribbean literature
- Bridget Jones Nelson (born 1964), American screenwriter
- Bridget Jones the tree, contestant on British reality TV series Sexy Beasts
- Bridgette Jones, a member of the mid-1990s London band Fluffy
