= 1935 in British television =

This is a list of events related to British television in 1935.

== Events ==
- 11 September – Final transmission of John Logie Baird's 30-line television system by the BBC. The BBC begins preparations for a regular high definition broadcasting service from Alexandra Palace in London.

== Births ==
- 24 January – Bamber Gascoigne, television host and author (died 2022)
- 17 February – Christina Pickles, actress
- 21 February – Mark McManus, Scottish actor (died 1994)
- 13 March – David Nobbs, comedy screenwriter (died 2015)
- 23 March – Barry Cryer, comedy writer and performer (died 2022)
- 24 March – Mary Berry, television presenter, chef and food writer
- 28 March – Michael Parkinson, journalist and television presenter (died 2023)
- 4 April – Trevor Griffiths, playwright and screenwriter (died 2024)
- 14 April – Terrance Dicks, television writer (died 2019)
- 19 April – Dudley Moore, actor, comedian and musician (died 2002)
- 1 May – Ian Curteis, director and playwright (died 2021)
- 17 May – Dennis Potter, writer (died 1994)
- 26 May – Sheila Steafel, actress (died 2019)
- 28 May – Anne Reid, actress
- 2 June – Roger Brierley, actor (died 2005)
- 16 June – James Bolam, actor
- 19 June – Derren Nesbitt, actor
- 28 June – John Inman, actor (died 2007)
- 9 July – Michael Williams, actor (died 2001)
- 12 July – Roy Barraclough, comic actor (died 2017)
- 15 July – William G. Stewart, television producer and presenter (died 2017)
- 20 July – Ted Rogers, comedian and light entertainer (died 2001)
- 21 July – Julian Pettifer, television journalist
- 28 July – Simon Dee, television presenter (died 2009)
- 13 August – Rod Hull, entertainer (died 1999)
- 15 August – Jim Dale, actor, composer, director, narrator and singer-songwriter
- 28 August – Harold Snoad, television comedy producer, director and scriptwriter (died 2024)
- 5 September – Johnny Briggs, actor (died 2021)
- 14 September – Amanda Barrie, actress
- 10 October – Judith Chalmers, broadcast presenter (died 2026)
- 28 October – Terence Donovan, English-born actor (died 2026)
- 29 October – Michael Jayston, actor (died 2024)
- 27 November – Verity Lambert, television producer (died 2007)

== See also ==
- 1935 in British music
- 1935 in the United Kingdom
- List of British films of 1935
