= Flanagan and Allen =

British singing and comedy double act

Comedy career
- Medium: Music hall, film, television, recording
- Genre: Comedy music
- Former members: Bud Flanagan and Chesney Allen

Flanagan and Allen were a British singing and comedy double act most active during the 1930s and 1940s. Its members were Bud Flanagan (1896–1968, born Chaim Weintrop) and Chesney Allen (1894–1982). They were first paired in a Florrie Forde revue, and were booked by Val Parnell to appear at the Holborn Empire in 1929.

== Career ==
As music hall comedians, they would often feature a mixture of comedy and music in their act; this led to a successful recording career as a duo and roles in film and television. Just prior to and throughout the Second World War they appeared in several films helmed by Marcel Varnel and John Baxter. Flanagan and Allen were both also members of the Crazy Gang and worked with that team for many years concurrently with their double-act career.

Flanagan and Allen's songs featured the same, usually gentle, humour for which the duo were known in their live performances, and during the Second World War they reflected the experiences of ordinary people during wartime. Songs such as "We're Going to Hang out the Washing on the Siegfried Line" mocked the German defences (Siegfried Line), while others including "Miss You" sang of missing one's sweetheart during enforced absences. Other songs, such as their most famous, "Underneath the Arches" (which Flanagan co-wrote with Reg Connelly), and the song "Umbrella Man" (which was used in many Merrie Melodies and Looney Tunes cartoons), had universal themes such as friendship. The music was usually melodic, following a binary verse, verse chorus structure, with a small dance band or orchestra providing the accompaniment. The vocals were distinctive because, while Flanagan was at least a competent singer and sang the melody lines, Allen used an almost spoken delivery to provide the harmonies and bass line. The duo appeared at the London Palladium at the first Royal Variety Performance in 1932.

The recordings of Flanagan and Allen and the duo are still impersonated by professionals and amateurs. Royal Variety Performances have sometimes featured people 'doing a Flanagan and Allen', notably Roy Hudd and Christopher Timothy, Bernie Winters and Leslie Crowther. In 1980, the latter two featured in a one-off musical drama called Bud & Ches, about the duo produced by ATV for the ITV network. Allen himself appeared in 1980 with Billy Dainty playing the Bud Flanagan part.

In 1971, the later comedy team Morecambe and Wise, who often expressed their admiration for Flanagan and Allen, recorded a tribute album, Morecambe and Wise Sing Flanagan and Allen (Phillips 6382 095), in which they performed some of the earlier team's best known songs in their own style, without attempting to imitate the originals.

Flanagan sang the main theme song, "Who Do You Think You Are Kidding Mr. Hitler?" for the 1968–1977 BBC Television comedy Dad's Army, a show about the wartime Home Guard.

Flanagan and Allen's song "Run, Rabbit, Run" had a revival in 2016–17, featuring prominently in two films: Get Out and Miss Peregrine's Home for Peculiar Children.

== Selected list of Flanagan and Allen songs ==
- "Run, Rabbit, Run"
- "Underneath the Arches"
- "Where the Arches Used To Be"
- "We're Going to Hang out the Washing on the Siegfried Line"
- "The Umbrella Man"
- "Shine on Harvest Moon"
- "On the Outside Looking In"
- "Oi!"
- "Miss You"
- "Are You Havin' Any Fun?"
- "I Don't Want to Walk Without You"
- "The Galloping Major"
- “What More Can I Say”
- "If a Grey Haired Lady Says "How's Your Father?" (That's Mademoiselle from Armentieres)"

== Selected filmography ==
- A Fire Has Been Arranged (1934)
- Underneath the Arches (1937)
- Alf's Button Afloat (1938)
- Gasbags (1940)
- We'll Smile Again (1942)
- Theatre Royal (1943)
- Here Comes the Sun (1946)
- Dunkirk (1958)
