= Leonard Henry =

Leonard Henry may refer to:

- Leonard Henry (American football)
- Leonard Henry (comedian)
- Preacher Henry, American baseball pitcher
