= Dandy Dick =

Dandy Dick may refer to:

- Dandy Dick (play), an 1887 stage farce by Arthur W. Pinero
- Dandy Dick (film), a 1935 film adaptation of the original play
