= Lend Me Your Husband =

Lend Me Your Husband may refer to:

- Lend Me Your Husband (1935 film), a British comedy film
- Lend Me Your Husband (1924 film), an American silent drama film
