= Bertha Willmott =

British actress, singer and music hall performer

Bertha Willmott on a cigarette card

Bertha Mary Willmott (16 September 1894 – 3 June 1973) was a British actress, comedienne, singer and music hall performer.

She was born in West Ham in Essex in 1894, the second of four daughters of Henry Benjamin Willmott (1863 - 1929), an engine fitter, and his wife Bertha Vivian (1872-1953), who married in 1891. When she was a girl at a London convent school the nuns encouraged and commenced her vocal training, which she continued at the London School of Music. At age 14 she became well known in the provinces for her Irish songs in costume. During World War I she appeared in the revue Razzle-Dazzle which opened in June 1916 at the Theatre Royal, Drury Lane where it ran for 408 performances. She spent much of her leisure singing for the soldiers. While playing in the chorus at the Empire Theatre in Leicester Square in 1918 she met Reginald Thomas Bishop Seymour (1895-1962), a Lieutenant in the Royal Garrison Artillery. They married three months later at Romford in Essex. From about 1939 the couple ran the Spinney Hill Hotel in Northampton. They had one son, Donald Henry Thomas Bishop Seymour (1920 - 1999). At about this time Willmott turned to comedy, and in 1924 she made her first radio broadcast from Savoy Hill. Billed as "The Radio Comedy Girl with a Voice", she scored success after success, especially with her contributions to the Old Time Music Hall series. In 1931 she appeared in the BBC radio musical show The Ridgeway Parade, while in 1935 she was in the British musical film Variety. From the 1920s through to the 1940s Willmott released a number of recordings, including 'Maggie! - Yes, Ma!' (1923), 'Mum And Dad And The Nipper' (1932), 'No ! No ! A Thousand Times No !' (1935), 'Live And Love Another Day' (1937), 'Bless 'Em All' (1940) and 'You'll Be Far Better Off In A Home' (1942).

Willmott made an early appearance in the new medium of television on 4 January 1937 in The Two Leslies and Bertha Willmott for the BBC Television Service. In 1938 she appeared with Seymour Hicks and Ellaline Terriss in the BBC radio broadcast of George Edwardes, an "illustrated biography" of the Edwardian musical impresario. In 1941 she sang music hall favourites in a BBC radio broadcast for military personnel serving during World War II, while in 1943 she played The Singer in Millions Like Us, a war-time British propaganda film. In April 1944 Willmott was among the cast of Variety Bandbox broadcast by BBC radio. In 1953 she appeared in the popular BBC light entertainment programme The Good Old Days. In the same year she was the Queen Ratling of the Grand Order of Lady Ratlings, a branch of the show-business charity the Grand Order of Water Rats.

Bertha Willmott Seymour died in 1973 in Northampton in Northamptonshire.
