= A Window in Piccadilly =

1928 film

- Directed by: Sidney Morgan
- Written by: Sidney Morgan
- Produced by: Sidney Morgan
- Starring: Joan Morgan; John F. Hamilton; James Carew; Julie Suedo
- Production company: Sidney Morgan Productions
- Distributed by: Woolf & Freedman Film Service
- Release date: January 1928
- Running time: 7,500 feet
- Country: United Kingdom
- Language: English

A Window in Piccadilly is a 1928 British silent romance film directed by Sidney Morgan and starring Joan Morgan, John F. Hamilton and James Carew. It was made at Twickenham Studios as an independent production by Sidney Morgan.

It was Edmund Willard's first acting role in a film.

== Cast ==
- Joan Morgan as The Girl
- John F. Hamilton as Piccolo
- James Carew as The Father
- Julie Suedo as Sally
- Maurice Braddell as Harry
- Edmund Willard as The Fourth Party
- DeGroot as The Professor

== Bibliography ==
- Low, Rachael. History of the British Film, 1918-1929. George Allen & Unwin, 1971.
- Wood, Linda. British Films 1927-1939. British Film Institute, 1986.
