= Irish Hearts (1934 film) =

- Directed by: Brian Desmond Hurst
- Written by: Johnson Abrahams (novel); Brian Desmond Hurst
- Produced by: Harry Clifton; Harley Knoles
- Starring: Lester Matthews; Nancy Burne; Molly Lamont; Patric Knowles
- Cinematography: Walter Blakeley; Eugen Schüfftan
- Music by: Herbert Hughes
- Production company: Clifton-Hurst Productions
- Distributed by: Metro-Goldwyn-Mayer
- Release date: November 1934
- Running time: 70 minutes
- Country: United Kingdom
- Language: English

Irish Hearts is a 1934 British drama film directed by Brian Desmond Hurst and starring Lester Matthews, Nancy Burne and Molly Lamont. It was made at Cricklewood Studios, as a quota quickie. It was also known by the alternative title Norah O'Neale. It was based on Johnson Abrahams's novel Night Nurse.

== Plot ==
A doctor is in love with two nurses, while he confronts an epidemic.

== Cast ==
- Lester Matthews as Dermot Fitzgerald
- Nancy Burne as Norah O'Neale
- Molly Lamont as Nurse Otway
- Patric Knowles as Pip Fitzgerald
- Kyrle Bellew as Matron
- Torin Thatcher as Dr. Hackey
- Patrick Barr as Dr. Connellan
- Sara Allgood as Mrs. Gogarthy
- Arthur Sinclair as Farmer
- Joyce Chancellor as Sheila Marr
- Kathleen Drago as Dublin Mother
- Maire O'Neill as Mrs. Moriarty
- Mehan Hartley as Fanninby
- Tom Collins as Dr. Joyce
- Pegeen Mair as Ward Nurse
- Mary Warren as Allannah Kenny
- Theresa McCormac as Mrs. Kenny
- Mary O'Reilly as Nurse Chambers
- Georgina Leech as Girl
- Iya Abdy as Casualty Nurse
- Sean Dempsey
- Leo Rowsome

== Bibliography ==
- Wood, Linda. British Films, 1927–1939. British Film Institute, 1986.
