= Don Russell (art director) =

British art director (1905–1972)

- Born: 26 January 1905; London, England, United Kingdom
- Died: 1972 (aged 66–67); Devon, England, United Kingdom
- Occupation: Art Director
- Years active: 1935-1964 (film)

Don Russell (1905–1972) was a British art director.

== Selected filmography ==
- Lend Me Your Husband (1935)
- Joy Ride (1935)
- To the Public Danger (1948)
- Trouble in the Air (1948)
- A Tale of Five Cities (1951)
- Dangerous Cargo (1954)
- Port of Escape (1956)
- The Dungeon of Harrow (1962)

== Bibliography ==
- Brian McFarlane. Lance Comfort. Manchester University Press, 1999.
