= Kenneth Villiers =

British actor (1912–1992)

- Born: 27 June 1912; Colombo, Ceylon
- Died: 27 August 1992 (aged 80)
- Occupations: Actor, Director, Interior Designer
- Years active: 1934–1948 (film)1948-1992 (interior design)

Kenneth Villiers (1912–1992) was a British film actor. He also directed three documentary films.

== Selected filmography ==
- Mr. Cohen Takes a Walk (1935)
- They Didn't Know (1936)
- Broken Blossoms (1936)
- Things to Come (1936)

== Bibliography ==
- Marshall, Wendy L. William Beaudine: From Silents to Television. Scarecrow Press, 2005.
- https://www.independent.co.uk/news/people/obituary-kenneth-villiers-1580529.html
