= Song at Eventide =

1934 film

- Fay Compton and Lester Matthews in the film
- Directed by: Harry Hughes
- Screenplay by: John Hastings Turner
- Produced by: John F. Argyle
- Starring: Fay Compton; Leslie Perrins; Lester Matthews
- Cinematography: Desmond Dickinson
- Production company: Argyle Talking Pictures
- Release date: 3 December 1934
- Running time: 85 minutes
- Country: United Kingdom
- Language: English

Song at Eventide is a 1934 British musical film directed by Harry Hughes and starring Fay Compton, Lester Matthews and Nancy Burne. It was written by John Hastings Turner. The screenplay concerns a top cabaret singer who is blackmailed in a scandal that threatens to ruin her and her family.

== Preservation status ==
The British Film Institute National Archive holds a collection of ephemera and stills but no film or video materials.

== Plot ==
The story is told in flashback of the rise of singer Helen D'Alaste from a dingy Marseilles café to be the toast of the stage, thanks to the efforts of her unscrupulous manager Ricardo. Lord Belsize falls in love with her, and they marry. When he discovers the secrets of her past he rejects her, taking custody of their child. Much later, Helen sees her now grown up daughter being the target of Ricardo's affections, and warns Lord Belsize of the danger. Helen decides the only way to find peace is to become a nun.

== Partial cast ==
- Fay Compton as Helen d'Alaste
- Lester Matthews as Lord Belsize
- Nancy Burne as Patricia Belsize
- Leslie Perrins as Ricardo
- Tom Helmore as Michael Law
- Minnie Rayner as Blondie
- O. B. Clarence as Registrar
- Tully Comber as Jim
- Barbara Gott as Anna
- Charles Paton as Director

== Reception ==
Kine Weekly wrote: "Conventional but popular melodrama set to music which tells its evergreen, artless story with sound dramatic effect. The unfolding is a trifle on the slow side, but every phase of the development is framed in appropriate and colourful settings, and emotional appeal is built up with commendable steadiness. Fay Compton runs the familiar gamut with conviction, and her particularly good singing voice, exploited to advantage, amplifies the touching sentiment."

The Daily Film Renter wrote: "Rather slow-moving narrative, with plot which may amuse the many. Effectively produced and sufficiently well acted."

Picture Show wrote: "The story of a cabaret singer's unfortunate experiences of married life, after which she enters a convent. Fay Compton scores as Helen, and gives a most sympathetic interpretation of the part; she is ably supported by Lester Mathews as Lord Belsize. The remainder of the cast put in some really good work."
