= They Didn't Know =

- Directed by: Herbert Smith
- Written by: Brock Williams
- Produced by: Herbert Smith
- Starring: Eve Gray; Leslie Perrins; Kenneth Villiers
- Cinematography: Geoffrey Faithfull
- Production company: British Lion Film Corporation
- Distributed by: Metro-Goldwyn-Mayer
- Release date: 24 April 1936
- Running time: 67 minutes
- Country: United Kingdom
- Language: English

They Didn't Know is a 1936 British comedy film directed by Herbert Smith and starring Eve Gray, Leslie Perrins and Kenneth Villiers. It was made at Beaconsfield Studios as a quota quickie.

== Cast ==
- Eve Gray as Cutie
- Leslie Perrins as Duval
- Kenneth Villiers as Basil Conway
- Hope Davy as Ursula
- John Deverell as Lord Budmarsh
- Diana Beaumont as Pamela Budmarsh
- C. Denier Warren as Padre
- Patrick Ludlow as Charles Rockway
- Maidie Hope as Lady Charfield
- A. Scott-Gaddy
- Hal Walters
- Fred Withers

== Bibliography ==
- Low, Rachael. Filmmaking in 1930s Britain. George Allen & Unwin, 1985.
- Wood, Linda. British Films, 1927-1939. British Film Institute, 1986.
