= Machinery and Technical Transport Limited =

The Machinery and Technical Transport Limited was an international shipping and forwarding agent based at Ling House, Dominion Street, London. In 1935, one of their gold deliveries were stolen from the strong room of Imperial Airways at Croydon Aerodrome in one of the largest thefts of gold bullion of the time, the Croydon Aerodrome robbery.
