= The Crimson Candle =

1934 British film by Bernard Mainwaring

- Directed by: Bernard Mainwaring
- Written by: Bernard Mainwaring
- Produced by: Bernard Mainwaring
- Starring: Eve Gray; Eliot Makeham; Kenneth Kove
- Distributed by: Metro-Goldwyn-Mayer
- Release date: February 1934
- Running time: 48 minutes
- Country: United Kingdom
- Language: English

The Crimson Candle is a 1934 British comedy crime film directed, written and produced by Bernard Mainwaring and starring Eve Gray, Eliot Makeham and Kenneth Kove. It was shot at Wembley Studios as a quota quickie for distribution by Metro-Goldwyn-Mayer.

== Preservation status ==
The British Film Institute National Archive holds no stills or ephemera, and no film or video materials.

== Plot ==
A doctor attempts to prove that a maid is a murderer.

== Cast ==
- Eve Gray as Mavis
- Eliot Makeham as Doctor Gaunt
- Kenneth Kove as Honorable Horatius Chillingsbotham
- Derek Williams as Leonard Duberley
- Kynaston Reeves as Inspector Blunt
- Eugene Leahy as detective
- Audrey Cameron as maid
- Arthur Goullet

== Reception ==
The Daily Film Renter wrote: "Action throughout is rather slow, and the acting performances are no more than adequate. Settings and general technique pass muster in quota booking for the not too critical. ... For the major part of the film little happens, and only towards the end does the picture begin to move. The acting generally is no more than adequate."

Picturegoer wrote: "Here is one of M.-G.-M.'s British quota pictures, a thoroughly ingenuous and aimless haunted-house comedy-drama which is dated in idea and production and would need a very unsophisticated audience to appreciate it. It is a pity that such artistes as Eve Gray, Eliot Makeham, Kenneth Koves and Kynaston Reeves – all of whom do their best with the poorest of material – should be given such a nonsensical plot."
