= Edmund Willard =

British actor (1884–1956)

Edmund Willard's 1939 Spotlight photo

Edmund Willard (19 December 1884 – 6 October 1956) was a British actor of the 1930s and 1940s.

Born in Brighton, Sussex in 1884, the nephew of Victorian era actor Edward Smith Willard, in 1920 Willard appeared in the plays of William Shakespeare at the Royal Shakespeare Theatre in Stratford-upon-Avon. He appeared in Hamlet, Twelfth Night, The Merchant of Venice, Richard III, and The Taming of the Shrew.

Willard's first film role was as the Fourth Party in A Window in Piccadilly (1928). His other film appearances include The Private Life of Don Juan (1934) with Douglas Fairbanks and Merle Oberon, The Scarlet Pimpernel (1934) with Leslie Howard and Raymond Massey, The Mystery of the Mary Celeste (1935) with Bela Lugosi, Van Zeeland in Rembrandt (1936) with Charles Laughton and Gertrude Lawrence, the Chief Steward in Underneath the Arches (1937) with Bud Flanagan, Chesney Allen and The Crazy Gang, the Chief of German Intelligence in Dark Journey (1937) with Vivien Leigh and Conrad Veidt, Hoots Mon! (1940) with Max Miller, Penn of Pennsylvania (1942) with Clifford Evans and Deborah Kerr, and The Young Mr. Pitt (1942) with Robert Donat and Robert Morley.

His television roles included appearances in Fabian of the Yard (1954), The Errol Flynn Theatre (1956) and The Scarlet Pimpernel (1956).

Willard married Mabel Theresa Tebbs (1885–1974) in 1907 at Steyning in Sussex. They had a daughter, the children's author Barbara Willard, and a son, Christopher Willard (died 1944).

Edmund Willard died in 1956 in Kingston, London, aged 71.

== Partial filmography ==
- The Green Orchard (1916) - Tony Rye
- A Window in Piccadilly (1928) - The Fourth Party
- Cape Forlorn (1931) - Henry Cass
- A Night in Montmartre (1931) - Alexandre
- The Crooked Lady (1932) - Joseph Garstin
- Rynox (1932) - Capt. James
- La mille et deuxième nuit (1933) - The Sultan (English version, voice)
- The Fear Ship (1933) - Jack Arkwright
- The Private Life of Don Juan (1934) - Prisoner (uncredited)
- The Iron Duke (1934) - Marshal Ney
- The Scarlet Pimpernel (1934) - Bibot - Republican Officer (uncredited)
- William Tell (1934) - Walter Fuerst
- Heat Wave (1935) - Hoffman
- Moscow Nights (1935) - Officer of Prosecution
- The Mystery of the Mary Celeste (1935) - Toby Bilson
- King of the Damned (1935) - The Greek
- Royal Eagle (1936) - Burnock
- Rembrandt (1936) - Van Zeeland
- The Mill on the Floss (1936) - (uncredited)
- Dark Journey (1937) - General Berlin of German Intelligence
- Underneath the Arches (1937) - Chief Steward
- Farewell Again (1937) - Pvt. Withers
- Smash and Grab (1937) - Cappellano
- Make It Three (1938) - Big Ed
- The Stars Look Down (1940) - Mr. Ramage
- Hoots Mon! (1940) - Sandy McBride
- Pastor Hall (1940) - Freundlich
- Atlantic Ferry (1941) - Robert Napier
- Penn of Pennsylvania (1942) - Ship's Captain
- The Young Mr. Pitt (1942) - Minor Role (uncredited)
- Cardboard Cavalier (1949) - Oliver Cromwell
- Helter Skelter (1949) - Ezekial
- Up in the World (1956) - Judge (uncredited) (final film role)
