= The Umbrella Man (song) =

"The Umbrella Man" (often popularly referred to as Any Umbrellas?) is a British song written by James Cavanaugh, Larry Stock and Vincent Rose. It was first published in 1924 and first performed live by the comedy double act Flanagan and Allen in 1939 in the musical revue These Foolish Things. It became one of their standards along with “Hometown” and “Underneath the Arches”. It is used in Dennis Potter's The Singing Detective (1986) and the TV adaptation of John le Carré's A Perfect Spy (1987).

Popular recordings in the United States in 1939 were made by Kay Kyser & His Orchestra (vocals by Ginny Simms & Harry Babbitt) and by the Johnny Messner Music Box Band (vocal by The Three Jacks).

== Chart information ==
Billboard magazine, issue dated January 28, 1939: Sheet-Music Leaders chart for week ending January 21, 1939: Umbrella Man charted at number 1.

== Other recordings ==
- Sammy Kaye and His Orchestra (1938)
- Ambrose & His Orchestra (vocal by Denny Dennis) (1939).
- Connee Boswell – recorded January 10, 1939, for Decca Records (catalog No. 2258A).
- Gracie Fields & Tommy Fields – recorded February 17, 1938, for Regal Zonophone Records (catalog No. MR-2996).
- Guy Lombardo and His Royal Canadians (Decca 2221)
