= Show Flat =

- Directed by: Bernard Mainwaring
- Written by: Martha Robinson (play); Cecil Maiden (play); George Barraud; Sherard Powell
- Produced by: Anthony Havelock-Allan
- Starring: Eileen Munro; Anthony Hankey; Clifford Heatherley; Polly Ward
- Production company: British & Dominions Film Corporation
- Distributed by: Paramount British Pictures
- Release date: October 1936
- Running time: 76 minutes
- Country: United Kingdom
- Language: English

Show Flat is a 1936 British comedy film directed by Bernard Mainwaring and starring Eileen Munro, Anthony Hankey and Clifford Heatherley. It was made at Shepperton Studios. The screenplay concerns a struggling couple who take over a vacant flat in order to impress somebody by holding a dinner there.

== Cast ==
- Eileen Munroas Aunt Louisa
- Anthony Hankey as Paul Collett
- Clifford Heatherley as Ginnsberg
- Max Faber as Ronnie Chubb
- Polly Ward as Mary Blake
- Vernon Harris as Tom Vernon
- Miki Decima as Miss Jube
- Billy Bray as Fox
- Victor Rietti

== Bibliography ==
- Low, Rachael. Filmmaking in 1930s Britain. George Allen & Unwin, 1985.
- Wood, Linda. British Films, 1927–1939. British Film Institute, 1986.
