= Royal Eagle =

1936 film

- Directed by: George A. Cooper
- Screenplay by: Arnold Ridley
- Produced by: Clive Loehnis
- Starring: John Garrick; Nancy Burne; Edmund Willard
- Production company: Quality Films (Elstree)
- Release date: 1936
- Running time: 70 minutes
- Country: United Kingdom
- Language: English

Royal Eagle is a 1936 British crime film directed by George A. Cooper and starring John Garrick, Nancy Burne, Felix Aylmer and Edmund Willard. It was written by Arnold Ridley, and was made as a quota quickie.

== Preservation status ==
The British Film Institute National Archive holds a collection of stills but no film or video materials.

== Plot ==
Clerk Jim Hornby finds himself suspected by Scotland Yard of being in cahoots with crooks Barnock and Vale, who are on the run, wanted for attempted robbery and murder. To give him some relaxation, his girlfriend Sally and her father and mother, take Hornby on the Royal Eagle pleasure steamer trip to Margate. Coincidentally, Barnock and Vale are also on board, masquerading as buskers. Barnock kills Vale, who had begun confessing to two police officers, and Hornby and Barnack fight. Hornby triumphs, saves Sally's life, and proves his innocence.

== Cast ==
- John Garrick as Jim Hornby
- Nancy Burne as Sally Marshall
- Felix Aylmer as Windridge
- Edmund Willard as Burnock
- Lawrence Anderson as Vale
- Hugh E. Wright as Albert Marshall
- Muriel Aked as Miss Mimm
- Fred Groves as Sam Waldock
- Betty Shale as Mrs Marshall

== Reception ==
Kine Weekly wrote: "Crime drama with a novel setting, played with a healthy ingenuousness which should appeal to the masses. ... Apart from its thematic and technical values, the film also has a good cast, unique exploitation angles, and the quota ticket. ... A novelty attraction with punch, the picture should have no difficulty in satisfying the crowd."

The Daily Film Renter wrote: "This film provides something new in backgrounds, in that most of the action is staged on a Thames pleasure steamer plying between London and Margate. ... Settings are extremely convincing, with picturesque Thames-side exteriors a feature. John Garrick is a manly Jim, and Nancy Burne a pleasing feminine lead, but honours go to Muriel Aked for her garrulous old woman, and Edmund Willard, who is a suitably villainous Burnock."
