= Where the Arches Used to Be =

Flanagan and Allen song

Single by Flanagan and Allen
- B-side: "Life Begins Again"
- Released: 1935
- Genre: Sentimental ballad
- Length: 2:57
- Label: Columbia
- Songwriters: Bud Flanagan; Horatio Nicholls

"Where the Arches Used to Be" is a song performed by the comedic act Flanagan and Allen in the 1935 film A Fire Has Been Arranged. It was a sequel to their popular theme song "Underneath the Arches". A sentimental ballad, the protagonists lament the fact that the railway arches where they have slept for many years are being knocked down and flats built in their place, leaving them homeless. The song ends with them heading out on the open road.

== Bibliography ==
- Sutton, David (2000). A Chorus of Raspberries: British Film Comedy 1929–1939. Exeter: University of Exeter Press. ISBN 978-0-85989-603-0.
