= It Happened in Paris (1935 film) =

- Opening titles
- Directed by: Robert Wyler; Carol Reed
- Screenplay by: H. F. Maltby; John Huston; Katherine Strueby
- Based on: L'Arpète by Yves Mirande
- Produced by: Ray Wyndham
- Starring: John Loder; Nancy Burne; Edward H. Robins
- Cinematography: Robert Martin
- Music by: Monia Liter
- Production company: Wyndham Films
- Distributed by: Associated British Film Distributors
- Release date: July 1935
- Running time: 68 minutes
- Country: United Kingdom
- Language: English

It Happened in Paris is a 1935 British romantic comedy film directed by Robert Wyler and Carol Reed, starring John Loder, Nancy Burne, and Esmé Percy. It was written by H. F. Maltby, John Huston and Katherine Strueby based on the play L'Arpete by Yves Mirande.

The film marked the directorial debut of Reed, who sources variously claim as having assisted directing or co-directed the film. It is also notable for John Huston's contribution to the screenplay. The film follows Paul, an American millionaire's son who travels to France to study art, and falls in love in Paris.

== Premise ==
Paul, the artistically-inclined son of an American millionaire, moves to Paris where he can find inspiration and study the masters. While there, he finds inspiration of a different sort in the form of the beautiful Jacqueline.

== Cast ==
- John Loder as Paul
- Nancy Burne as Jacqueline
- Edward H. Robins as Knight
- Dorothy Boyd as Patricia
- Esmé Percy as Pommier
- Minnie Rayner as Concierge
- Lawrence Grossmith as Bernard
- Bernard Ansell as Simon
- Jean Gillie as Musette
- Margaret Yarde as Marthe
- Roy Emerton as Gendarme
- Warren Jenkins as Raymond
- Paul Sheridan as Baptiste
- Kyrle Bellew as Ernestine
- Arthur Burne as minor role
- Eveline Chipman as Mrs. Carstairs
- Greta Gynt as minor role
- Bela Mila as Madame Renault
- Dennis Val Norton as Roger
- Nancy Pawley as Ernestine
- Bill Shine as Albert

== Production ==
The film was made at Ealing Studios by the independent production company Wyndham Films.

== Reception ==
Kine Weekly wrote: "Simple, romantic drama, the Cinderella story of which is set in a colourful pseudo French atmosphere. The plot makes no great demands on the intellect, but it gently explores all the popular avenues of the novelette and provides in its perambulations pleasant light entertainment for the unsophisticated."

The Daily Film Renter wrote: "Opening contains many entertaining light touches, depicting Gallic camaraderie of struggling painters. Growth of love between hero and dress designer is effectively portrayed, profession of latter serving to introduce display of models which should please feminine patrons. Later scenes dealing with lovers' misunderstanding is familiar fare, but capable acting makes the film safe popular material for most houses."
