= Once a Thief (1935 film) =

1935 film

- Directed by: George Pearson
- Written by: Robert Dargavel
- Screenplay by: Basil Mason
- Produced by: Anthony Havelock-Allan
- Starring: John Stuart; Nancy Burne
- Cinematography: Francis Carver
- Edited by: F.C. Wilson
- Production company: British & Dominions Film Corporation
- Distributed by: Paramount British Pictures
- Release date: 14 June 1935 (London)
- Running time: 67 minutes
- Country: United Kingdom
- Language: English

Once a Thief is a 1935 British black-and-white crime film directed by George Pearson and starring John Stuart and Nancy Burne. It was written by Basil Mason from a story by Robert Dargavek and made as a quota quickie by British & Dominions Film Corporation and Paramount British Pictures.

== Plot ==
Industrial chemist Roger Drummond invents a new formula for paint. In short-term need of money, he borrows some cash from a handbag he finds, and later returns the money, but in then meantime a valuable necklace has been stolen from the bag by a thief, and Drummond is charged with the theft by the bags's owner, Marion Ashley, niece of his employer. Drummond is found guilty and is sent to prison, and in his absence his colleague George Marston steals the paint formula. On his release Drummond exposes Marston, and finds love with Marion.

== Cast ==
- John Stuart as Roger Drummond
- Nancy Burne as Marion Ashley
- Lewis Shaw as Frank Ashley
- Derek Gorst as George Marston
- Frederick Culley as Sir John Chirwin
- Lola Duncan as Mrs. Eagle
- Joan Kemp-Welch as Alice
- Ronald Shiner as man

== Reception ==
Kine Weekly wrote: "There are too many loose ends in this British drama for it to aspire higher than the supporting feature category, and even then the quota ticket still represents the main excuse for booking it. The principal players certainly strive hard to build drama into the salient situations, but important threads are too haphazardly discarded for the entertainment as a whole to reach a satisfactory standard."

The Daily Film Renter wrote: "Highly artificial in tone, plot never succeeds in getting at grips with reality, while players struggle hard with puppet-like roles. Quota support for uncritical patrons only."
