= Breakers Ahead (1935 film) =

1935 British film by Anthony Gilkison

- Directed by: Anthony Gilkison
- Written by: Anthony Gilkison
- Produced by: Fraser Foulsham
- Starring: Barry Livesey; Roddy Hughes; Cicely Oates
- Music by: Charles Cowlrick; Hubert Bath
- Production company: Anglo-Cosmopolitan Productions
- Distributed by: Reunion Films
- Release date: February 1935
- Running time: 58 minutes
- Country: United Kingdom
- Language: English

Breakers Ahead is a 1935 British drama film directed by Anthony Gilkison and starring Barry Livesey, Roddy Hughes and Cicely Oates. It was produced at Shepperton Studios as a quota quickie and is also known by the alternative title The Lady of Pendower. It included scenes of Cornish wrestling featuring Francis Gregory.

Scenes were shot at St Winwaloe's Church, Gunwalloe and Gwithian Sands and hundreds of local people from Penzance were used as extras.

== Synopsis ==
In Cornwall two fishermen are bitter rivals. One unsuccessfully tries to drown another. However he later redeems himself by saving the other during a storm at the cost of his own life.

== Cast ==
- Barry Livesey as George Kenyon
- April Vivian as Stella Trevarthon
- Billy Holland as Bob Pentreath
- Roddy Hughes as Will
- Cicely Oates as Aunt Martha
- Richard Worth as Skipper
- Francis Gregory as Champion Cornish wrestler

== Bibliography ==
- Chibnall, Steve. Quota Quickies: The Birth of the British 'B' Film. British Film Institute, 2007.
- Low, Rachael. Filmmaking in 1930s Britain. George Allen & Unwin, 1985.
- Wood, Linda. British Films, 1927-1939. British Film Institute, 1986.
