= Mr. Cohen Takes a Walk =

1935 film

- Theatrical release poster
- Directed by: William Beaudine
- Screenplay by: Brock Williams
- Based on: Mr. Cohen Takes a Walk; 1934 novel by Mary Roberts Rinehart
- Produced by: Irving Asher
- Starring: Paul Graetz; Violet Farebrother; Chili Bouchier
- Music by: Basil Emmott
- Production company: Warner Bros. Pictures
- Distributed by: Warner Bros. Pictures
- Release date: 13 December 1935
- Running time: 80 minutes
- Country: United Kingdom
- Language: English

Mr. Cohen Takes a Walk (also known as Mister Cohen Takes a Walk and Father Takes a Walk), is a 1935 British comedy film directed by William Beaudine and starring Paul Graetz, Violet Farebrother, and Chili Bouchier. It was written by Brock Williams based on the 1935 novel by Mary Roberts Rinehart. It was one of many British quota quickies produced by Warner Bros. Pictures.

== Preservation status ==
The BFI National Archive holds a collection of ephemera and stills but no film or video materials.

== Plot ==
Jake Cohen, the owner of a department store, goes on the road, and leaves the business under the control of his children, only to have to return when they fight with each other on the eve of a workers' strike.

== Cast ==
- Paul Graetz as Jake Cohen
- Violet Farebrother as Rachel Cohen
- Chili Bouchier as Julia Levine
- Mickey Brantford as Jack Cohen
- Ralph Truman as Sam Cohen
- Barry Livesey as Joe Levine
- Sam Springson as Abraham Levy
- Kenneth Villiers as Bob West
- Meriel Forbes as Sally O'Connor
- George Merritt as Pat O'Connor

== Reception ==
The Monthly Film Bulletin wrote: "Marred by a hackneyed subsidiary plot the story in general lacks originality. The production is weak and the casting on the whole is poor, but Paul Graetz as Jacob Cohen makes something of a tedious part and succeeds in giving the latter stages of the film a convincing air. The propagandist conclusion is out of place. The small role of a country clergyman taken by an unmentioned actor deserves notice."

Kine Weekly wrote: "Tender, whimsical Jewish character comedy drama, covering the complete gamut of popular entertainment through the delightful and accurate performance of Paul Graetz, in the name part. Into the star's portrayal can be read sound philosophy, refreshing humour, and tender, human interest, and it is these qualities that bring to the wide itinerary, mapped out by the homely story, the power to intrigue all types of audiences. Smoothly balanced by a strong supporting cast, and admirably mounted technically, the picture represents a first-rate general booking."

The Daily Film Renter wrote: "Human story of lovable Jewish department store king who takes holiday on road as tramp, returning post haste, however, when labour troubles threaten smooth running of business. Splendidly acted by Paul Graetz, who gives polished character study in lead, subject is convincingly staged in appropriate settings, with picturesque rural exteriors as attractive feature. Sympathetic direction, unobtrusive romantic element, and amusing comedy trimmings. Good popular entertainment."

Picturegoer wrote: "While in no sense a 'super', this human little picture in its unpretentious way is more deserving of three stars than many which rank in the former class. While delightful in the sincere simplicity of its plot, it is notable too for the sensitive performance given by Paul Graetz in the title role – a part, incidentally, which caused Hollywood to take notice of Mr. Graetz. ... William Beaudine's direction is a little leisurely, but the acting is so good that one can forgive that."

Picture Show wrote: "Paul Graetz as Jacob Cohen gives a most vivid portrayal of the kindly, simple Jew. Micky Brantford and Ralph Truman play the roles of the sons well. Violet Farebrother as Mrs. Cohen is extremely good. ... An entertaining but rather slow-moving picture."
