= Bernard Mainwaring =

British film director (1897–1963)

Bernard Mainwaring (1897–1963) was a British film director.

== Selected filmography ==
- The Crimson Candle (1934)
- Whispering Tongues (1934)
- Line Engaged (1935)
- Old Roses (1935)
- The Public Life of Henry the Ninth (1935)
- Show Flat (1936)
- Cross My Heart (1937)
- Jennifer Hale (1937)
- Member of the Jury (1937)
- The Villiers Diamond (1938)
