= Flying Fifty-Five =

- DVD cover
- Directed by: Reginald Denham
- Written by: Vernon Clancey; Kenneth Horne; Victor M. Greene
- Based on: The Flying Fifty-Five by Edgar Wallace
- Produced by: Victor M. Greene
- Starring: Derrick De Marney; Nancy Burne; Marius Goring; Peter Gawthorne
- Cinematography: Ernest Palmer
- Edited by: Ted Richards
- Production company: Admiral Films
- Distributed by: RKO Pictures
- Release date: May 1939
- Running time: 72 minutes
- Country: United Kingdom
- Language: English
- Budget: £18,304

Flying Fifty-Five (also known as Flying 55) is a 1939 British sports-drama film directed by Reginald Denham and starring Derrick De Marney, Nancy Burne, Marius Goring, John Warwick and Peter Gawthorne. It was written by Vernon Clancey, Kenneth Horne and Victor M. Greene, and made by Admiral Films at Welwyn Studios. The film is based on a 1922 novel of the same name by Edgar Wallace which had previously been made into a 1924 silent film The Flying Fifty-Five.

== Plot ==
After being disinherited by his wealthy father, an amateur jockey, Bill Urquhart goes to work under an assumed name (Bill Hart) at a rural racing stables owned and run by Stella Barrington and her drunken brother, Charles, who is an old friend of Bill's. Confusion arises when Bill is mistakenly reported to have been murdered.

== Partial cast ==
- Derrick De Marney as Bill Urquhart
- Nancy Burne as Stella Barrington
- Marius Goring as Charles Barrington
- John Warwick as Jebson
- Peter Gawthorne as Jonas Urquhart
- D. A. Clarke-Smith as Jacques Gregory
- Amy Veness as Aunt Eliza
- Ronald Shiner as Scrubby Oaks
- Billy Bray as Cheerful
- Francesca Bahrle as Clare
- Terry-Thomas as young man
- Norman Pierce as creditor
- Basil McGrail as jockey

== Reception ==
The Monthly Film Bulletin wrote: "This is obviously a cheaply made film, and has little to recommend it except some pleasant riding scenes."

Kine Weekly wrote: "Romantic melodrama of the Turf, adapted from a story by Edgar Wallace. Good enough, but it is not the author at his best; for one thing it fails to inherit his flair for covering up the obvious, and for another its development is too tranquil. Accurate characterisation, refreshing native atmosphere and an inherent sense of humour stifle criticism."

The Daily Film Renter wrote: "Occasionally naive, but reasonably well acted and safe popular entertainment, Wallace name providing drawing card."

== See also ==
- List of films about horses
- List of films about horse racing
