= Janet Reger =

British lingerie designer and entrepreneur

- Born: Janet Chabinsky; 30 September 1935; London, England
- Died: 14 March 2005 (aged 69)
- Awards: 2013 UK Lingerie Award for Favourite British Designer Of The Year
- Website: https://janetreger.com/

Janet Reger (née Chabinsky (Phillips); 30 September 1935 – 14 March 2005) was a British lingerie designer and business woman, best known for her eponymous lingerie brand which became famous in the 1960s and 1970s.

== Early life and education ==
Born Janet Chabinsky into a Jewish family in the East End of London in 1935, she was the granddaughter of Jewish-Russian immigrants who came to England to seek a better life and escape persecution. Reger's family had a background in the clothing industry, her grandfather ran a textile business and her parents manufactured bras during the Second World War. Chabinsky was hard to pronounce, so people would call Reger's grandfather, Philip, his first name. Eventually, the family adopted Phillips as a surname. by When The Blitz started during World War Two, the family fled to Reading where they were much safer, and where Reger was further raised.

An excerpt from Janet's autobiography (Janet Reger: Her Story) reads, "At the beginning we lived in Jubilee Street, in the East End of London. I was nearly four when World War II's blitz began, and my little sister, Barbara, had just been born. All that first week of bombing we slept in the air-raid shelter in the garden. One afternoon as I played hopscotch in the street, the sirens sounded and my father snatched me from my game and ran with me in his arms to the shelter. We scrambled down the steps as the first bomb fell, a screaming sound that made me put my fingers in my ears. And then, the explosion, worse than anything we had heard before. My father had closed the curtain across the entrance, so we lay in the dark, listening to the planes, the bombs, the guns. It was hours before the all clear and we emerged to see gaping holes in our house, the entire street a sign of devastation."

Reger was at Battle Council Primary School. She later studied "Contour Fashion", underwear and swimwear design at Leicester College of Art and Design in the 1950s.

== Personal life ==
In May 1958, Reger moved to a kibbutz, Ma'agan Michael, in Israel. There, she met her husband, Peter Reger, whom she married on 1 January 1961. They had a daughter, Aliza Reger, on 27 December 1963. In 1985, Peter died by suicide.

Janet Reger died on 14 March 2005 after a long battle with cancer and her daughter Aliza became chief executive and took over the business which was still active into the 2020s.

Reger wrote an autobiography, Janet Reger: Her Story (1991).

== Career ==
After Leicester, Reger found a job in Margaret Street, "heart of the rag trade" as she said in her autobiography. She worked there as the sole designer and pattern cutter. Reger later started working as a designer at Marks & Spencer in Somerset, Slix swimwear in London, and Daintyfit.

In 1966, Reger decided to set up her own lingerie business with her husband, Peter Reger. It began as a small backstreet store and quickly turned into a recognised international company. With a lot of scepticism that she received for her bold designs for undergarments, in the 1970s Reger took part in the revolution for lingerie becoming a fashion statement rather than just an undergarment.

In 1974 Janet opened a factory in Wirksworth, Derbyshire, where she made underwear and had a factory shop in London's West End at 12 New Bond Street, Mayfair, until the 1980s.
