= Old Roses =

- George Hayes and Horace Hodges in the film
- Directed by: Bernard Mainwaring
- Written by: Anthony Richardson
- Produced by: Bernard Mainwaring
- Starring: Horace Hodges; Nancy Burne; Bruce Lester
- Music by: Colin Wark (musical director)
- Distributed by: Fox Film Company
- Release date: 1935
- Running time: 60 minutes
- Country: United Kingdom
- Language: English

Old Roses is a 1935 British crime film directed by Bernard Mainwaring and starring Horace Hodges, Nancy Burne and Bruce Lester. It was written by Anthony Richardson, and was made as a quota quickie. The screenplay concerns an elderly man who assists the police in solving a murder, but accidentally reveals his own criminal past in the process.

== Plot ==
Johnnie Lee, known as "Old Roses", spends his retirement growing roses in rural Devon. Local sweethearts Chris Morgan and Jenny Erroll, whose relationship is disapproved of by Chris's father, use Johnnie's home as a clandestine meeting place. Johnnie is fighting to keep his home, which is on land needed for a new road development. When Chris is suspected of murder, Johnnie, believing in his innocence, decides to save him. He makes a false confession, and in doing so reveals an unhappy episode in his own past. When the real murderer is discovered, Johnnie is released, but his noble act on Chris's behalf softens the heart of Chris's father, who sanctions Chris's marriage to Jenny.

== Cast ==
- Horace Hodges as Johnnie Lee
- Nancy Burne as Jenny Erroll
- Bruce Lester as Chris Morgan
- Charles Mortimer as John Morgan
- Felix Aylmer as Lord Sandelbury
- Wilfred Walter as Sweeton
- Esme Church as Mrs Erroll
- George Hayes as Simes
- Eric Portman as Lou
- Trefor Jones as singing gypsy

== Reception ==
Kine Weekly wrote: "The tale told in this simple picture is so old-fashioned that few will accept its sugary sentiment. The players do their best with the naive plot and trite dialogue, but little in the way of general entertainment rewards their efforts. It is just a pretty-pretty quota feature for small halls. ... This film is little more than a character sketch with melodramatic and romantic embellishments."

The Daily Film Renter wrote: "Confused plot issues, loosely knit narrative structure, farrago of incredible incidents, and crudely introduced killing for which old man takes blame, militate against entertainment values. Indifferently directed, poorly acted, undistinguished presentation. Natural work of Horace Hodges and pleasant village exteriors only assets. Quota support for uncritical. Incredibly naive, this story wanders all over the place before the tortuously contrived climax hoves in sight."

Picture Show wrote: "The main appeal of this unpretentious British picture lies in the characterisation of 'Old Roses' by Horace Hodges. ... The story is not too convincing, and is none too convincingly played, but the outdoor sequences are really lovely."
