= Nancy Burne =

British actress (1912–1954)

- Gallaher cigarette card, 1935
- Born: 23 December 1907; Chorlton, Lancashire, England
- Died: 25 March 1954 (aged 46); Maidstone, Kent, England
- Occupation: Actress

Nancy Burne (23 December 1907 – 25 March 1954) was an English stage and film actress.

== Biography ==
Born in Chorlton, Lancashire, she began her film career at British International Pictures, starring alongside comedians such as Gene Gerrard, Stanley Lupino and Will Hay. Most of her subsequent screen appearances were as a leading lady in quota quickies.

She starred alongside John Loder in the 1935 romantic comedy It Happened in Paris, which marked Carol Reed's debut as director. In 1937 she had a supporting role in the independent film Thunder in the City, an expensive drama starring Edward G. Robinson which was a major financial and critical failure. Her final screen appearance was in the 1939 horseracing film Flying Fifty-Five.

== Filmography ==
- The Love Nest (1933)
- The Butterfly Affair (1933)
- Facing the Music (1933)
- The Warren Case (1934)
- Irish Hearts (1934)
- Song at Eventide (1934)
- Dandy Dick (1935)
- Lend Me Your Husband (1935)
- Trust the Navy (1935)
- Once a Thief (1935)
- Old Roses (1935)
- It Happened in Paris (1935)
- Reasonable Doubt (1936)
- A Wife or Two (1936)
- Royal Eagle (1936)
- Skylarks (1936)
- Knights for a Day (1937)
- Thunder in the City (1937)
- John Halifax (1938)
- Flying Fifty-Five (1939)
