= Croydon Aerodrome robbery =

1935 theft from Croydon Aerodrome, England

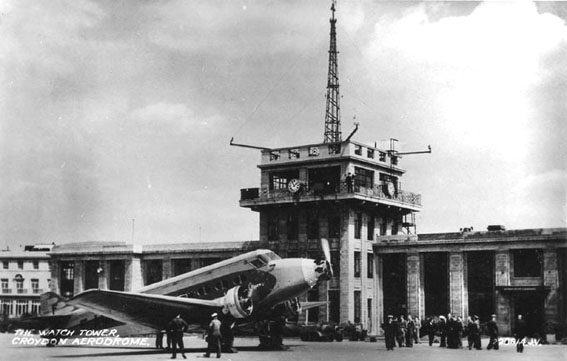
- Croydon Aerodrome in the 1930s
- Date: 5 March 1935
- Outcome: £21,000 worth of gold stolen and never recovered
- Accused: Cecil Swanland; Silvio "Shonck" Mazzarda; John O'Brien
- Verdict: Swanland convicted, Mazzarada and O'Brien acquitted

The Croydon Aerodrome robbery was the theft of £21,000 worth of gold bullion, gold sovereigns and American Eagles from London's Croydon Aerodrome (then in Surrey) on 6 March 1935. As was customary at the aerodrome, only one security guard was on duty; he held the keys to the strong room, and met each incoming cargo flight. A gang of men had acquired a duplicate set of keys, and were able to enter the strong room in the almost empty aerodrome and leave with the gold.

Three men were charged with the theft. One was convicted and sentenced to seven years in prison, while the other two were acquitted after a witness changed his testimony. Not all the gang members were identified, and the gold was never found.

== Background ==
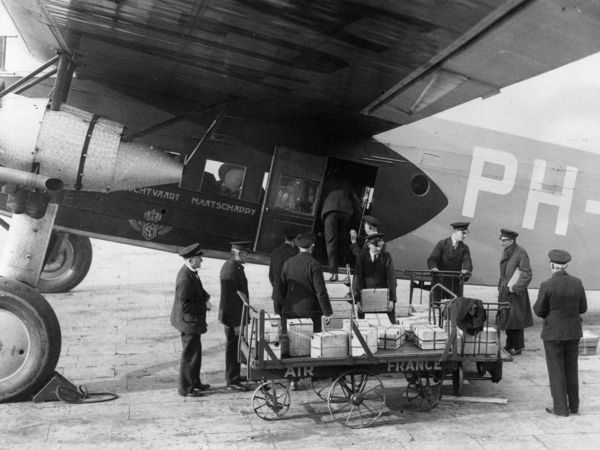
Russian gold being unloaded at Croydon Aerodrome in 1934.

During the interwar years, Croydon Aerodrome was London's main airport. Large amounts of cargo, mail and gold passed through the airport en route to and from other parts of the world. In 1935, Flight described the "KLM gold rush" in which, over two days, "altogether twelve special machines, fully loaded with bullion, English sovereigns and American gold dollars, arrived at Croydon from Holland. Moreover, every service machine, and there are four each way daily, carried as much bullion as a brisk passenger traffic would allow." In one week in May of 1935, gold worth three-quarters of a million pounds arrived at Croydon from Paris.

== The theft ==
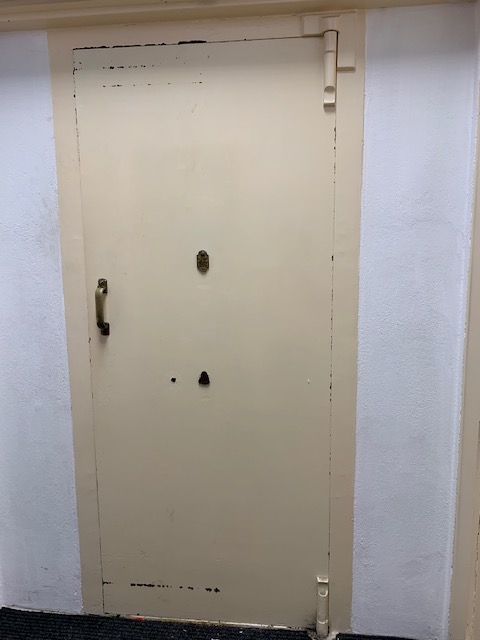
Strong room door at Imperial Airways Croydon Airport

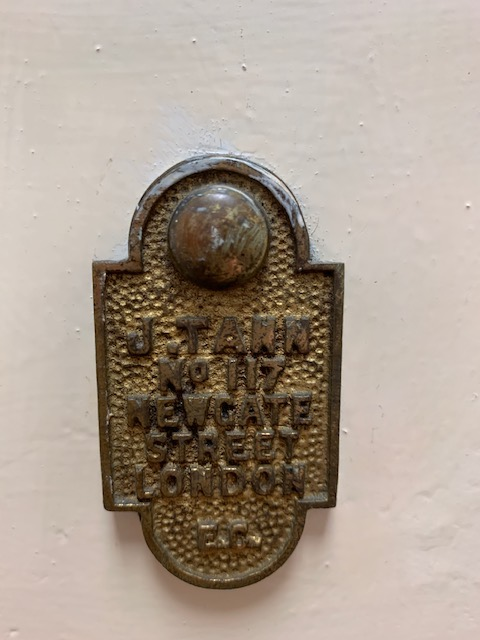
John Tann lock on strong room door at Croydon Airport

On the night of 6 March 1935, Francis Johnson was the sole security guard at the aerodrome, as was usual. Three boxes of gold, bound for Paris and Belgium, had been transferred to the strong room of Imperial Airways earlier that day. One set of keys to the strong room was locked in the superintendent's drawer, and a second set was in the possession of Johnson. He was asleep until shortly after 4 am, when a German aircraft arrived. He then left the terminal to receive the flight. At that time, the vault was locked.

A few hours later, the strong room was found unlocked, and £21,000 (equivalent to £1,700,000, in 2024) worth of gold bullion, gold sovereigns and American Eagles, which Machinery and Technical Transport Limited had entrusted to Imperial Airways, was discovered to be missing.

== Police investigation ==
The police investigation discovered that a cyclist passing by in the early hours of the morning had noted the number plate of a taxi that was suspected to have been used in the robbery. This led the police to George Mason, the driver. Mason disclosed that he had been coaxed by a man named "Little Harry" to drive him and three other men, one of whom was Cecil Swanland, to the airport from King's Cross, collect the gold and deliver it to Swanland's house. Swanland's landlady, Mrs Schultz, reported seeing men unloading boxes from a taxi that same morning, on 6 March.

Swanland had no money and was unable to explain why he had ordered gold cufflinks, £59 worth of clothes and a £50 brooch. A number of incriminating items were found at his home by the police. These included an Imperial Airways timetable, gold seals in his bin and an iron band in the fireplace, similar to those used for holding gold bars together.

Three men were charged with the crime:

- Cecil Swanland, a 47-year-old artist, who had previously been convicted of robbery and forgery, and had already served two jail sentences.
- Silvio "Shonck" Mazzarda, a 38-year-old bookmaker who was also a member of the Sabini gang.
- John O'Brien, a man in his 70s.

Initially, the taxi driver identified Mazzarda and O'Brien in an identity parade, even stating that he had known Mazzarda for 30 years.

According to a police interview of Mazzarda in 1937, replicas of the strong room keys were obtained from the chief unloader, Burtwell Peters.

== The trial ==
Graham Brooks, the prosecuting lawyer at Croydon Borough Police Court, described the robbery as being "as dramatic as an Edgar Wallace novel". He explained:

It was a perfectly quiet and peaceful night at Croydon Aerodrome and everyone thought the gold was locked in the strong room. At seven in the morning a clerk named Ashton went into the strong room. He went to unlock the iron doors but to his surprise found they were unlocked and the room was empty.

The case against Mazzarda and O'Brien collapsed, however, after Mason, the taxi driver, changed his testimony and stated that Mazzarda was not in the taxi.

Swanland was sentenced to seven years imprisonment for his crime. Mazzarda and O'Brien were acquitted.

== Aftermath ==
There still remain unsolved mysteries surrounding the robbery, including the identities of some of the gang members, and what happened to the gold. After the robbery, Swanland's wife, now evicted, moved in with her mother at 28 Dean Street, where the police believed the gold had been transported. She applied to leave money for her husband at Wandsworth Prison, and was noted to have a significant sum in the bank following the theft.

The robbery came before the House of Lords in 1939, in a case known as Philippson and Others v. Imperial Airways, Limited, in which the victims sought compensation from Imperial Airways for their loss, in respect to gold they had consigned for transfer between London and Belgium. The case turned on the exact terms and conditions of carriage between the parties, with the Lords ruling in favour of the claimants. Police records relating to the case are held by the British National Archives at Kew.

== See also ==
- Great Train Robbery (1963)
- List of heists in the United Kingdom
