= Underneath the Arches (song) =

1932 song by Bud Flanagan

Sheet music

"Underneath the Arches" is a 1932 popular song with words and music by Bud Flanagan, and additional lyrics by Reg Connelly. It was one of the most famous songs of the duo Flanagan and Allen.

According to a television programme broadcast in 1957, Bud Flanagan said that he wrote the song in Derby in 1927, and first performed it a week later at the Pier Pavilion, Southport. It refers to the arches of Derby's Friargate Railway Bridge and to the cobbled street where homeless men slept during the Great Depression.

== Singing Sculpture ==
The Flanagan and Allen recording was used as part of the performance art piece The Singing Sculpture, by artists Gilbert & George, premiered in 1969. The artists stood on a table, their hands and heads covered in multi-coloured metallic powder, and sang along with the recording while they moved. At times the performance would last for a day.

== Covers ==
The song has also been covered by Connee Boswell, Primo Scala, the Andrews Sisters, and Andy Russell in the United States. A well-known version in the United Kingdom was made by Max Bygraves. A sequel to the song, Where the Arches Used To Be, was sung by Flanagan and Allen in the film A Fire Has Been Arranged in which the arches are knocked down and flats built in their place.

The Primo Scala recording, with the Keynotes, was released by London Records as catalogue number 238. The record first reached the Billboard charts on 6 August 1948, and lasted 16 weeks on the chart, peaking at No. 6.

The Andrews Sisters' recording was released by Decca Records as catalogue number 24490 (the flip side of their recording of You Call Everybody Darlin'). The record first reached the Billboard charts on 27 August 1948, and lasted 10 weeks on the chart, peaking at No. 10.

The Andy Russell recording was released by Capitol Records as catalogue number 15183. The record first reached the Billboard charts on 1 October 1948, and lasted 5 weeks on the chart, peaking at No. 21.

In 1968 Australian pop singer, Johnny Farnham, covered the track, as his second single, which reached No. 6 on the Go-Set National Top 40 Singles Chart. In 1970 the artist duo Gilbert & George performed the song in Nigel Greenwood Gallery, which launched their career as "singing and living sculptures".

The song is used in the television mini-series A Perfect Spy, based on the novel by John le Carré, while father and son (the key figures) are running under arches near a British beach. It was also the signature tune for the Radio London Underneath the Arches programme. The Song is also referenced by the London based 90's band Carter USM in the song "An All American National Sport" From the album 101 Damnations.

== See also ==
- Pub song
- Underneath the Arches, arranged by Robert McAnally (1959)
