= Mary Grant Carmichael =

English composer

Mary Grant Carmichael (1851 – 17 March 1935) was an English composer. She was born in Birkenhead near Liverpool, and may have been of Irish parentage. She was educated in France and Switzerland, and later studied music in Munich. After completing her education, she worked as a pianist and an accompanist. She died in London.

== Works ==
Carmichael was known as a composer of songs and piano pieces. Selected works include:

- Cradle song (in Four songs) (Text: William Blake)
- Infant Joy (Text: William Blake)
- Introduction to the Songs of Innocence (Text: William Blake)
- It is the hour (Text: George Gordon Noel Byron, Lord Byron)
- Merrily flute and loudly (in Three Lyrics (first set) from Heine's Book of Songs) (Text: after Heinrich Heine)
- Mona spinning (Text: Alice Cary), published in The Girl's Own Paper (1886)
- My faint spirit, op. 12 (Text: Percy Bysshe Shelley)
- So loved and so loving, op. 8 no. 1 (in Three Lyrics (second set) from Heine's Book of Songs) (Text: after Heinrich Heine)
- Sweetheart, sigh no more (Text: Thomas Bailey Aldrich)
- The blossom (in Four songs) (Text: William Blake)
