= The Public Life of Henry the Ninth =

1935 film

- Directed by: Bernard Mainwaring
- Written by: C. G. H. "Bert" Ayres (uncredited)
- Produced by: Henry Fraser Passmore
- Starring: Leonard Henry; Betty Frankiss; George Mozart
- Production company: Hammer Productions
- Distributed by: Metro-Goldwyn-Mayer
- Release date: June 1935
- Running time: 61 minutes
- Country: United Kingdom
- Language: English

The Public Life of Henry the Ninth is a lost 1935 British comedy film directed by Bernard Mainwaring and starring Leonard Henry, Betty Frankiss, and George Mozart. It was written (uncredited) by C. G. H. "Bert" Ayres .

The film was the first film made by Hammer Productions, and was Henry's film debut. It is set largely in the bar of the Henry VIII public house, with the title alluding to the 1933 Oscar-winning film The Private Life of Henry VIII.

== Preservation status ==
The British Film Institute has classed The Public Life of Henry the Ninth as a lost film, included in its "75 Most Wanted" list. The BFI National Archive holds a collection of ephemera and stills but no film or video materials.

== Plot ==
An unemployed street entertainer named Henry becomes a singing sensation when he is allowed to perform at a pub called the "Henry VIII". Henry partners with the barmaid Maggie to form a duo, and he adopts the stage name "Henry the Ninth". He later brings his friends from his old vaudeville days into the act, and business at the bar starts to boom. The owner of the pub refuses to credit his sudden business success to Henry however, which leads Henry to storm off for the London stage, taking his troupe with him.

== Cast ==
- Leonard Henry as Henry
- Betty Frankiss as Maggie
- George Mozart as draughts player
- Wally Patch as landlord
- Aileen Latham as Liz
- Mae Bacon as landlady
- Herbert Langley as Police Constable
- Dorothy Vernon as Mrs. Fickle

== Release ==
The trade show was held on January 30, 1935, and the film went into general release by Metro-Goldwyn-Mayer in June, 1935. It was released again in 1940, this time by Exclusive.

== Critical reception ==
Kinematograph Weekly reviewed the film in its June 15, 1935 issue, writing: "Pleasant artless comedy, no serious pretensions, but does fill an hour quite pleasantly. Lighting and photography are up to standard."

The Daily Film Renter wrote: "Pleasing supporting feature for the masses ... Leonard Henry makes his screen debut in this, the maiden: effort of a new British production company, with a considerable degree of success. ...Aileen Latham stands out as an unprepossessing barmaid, who 'blossoms out' under Henry's tuition, while the heroine is played by Betty Frankiss. Wally Patch makes a robust landlord, and Mai [sic] Bacon has some good moments as his wife."

The Monthly Film Bulletin wrote: "Good light entertainment. Without being riotously funny, the piece has a number of genuinely amusing situations. There are good sidelights on Cockney life. Leonard Henry is a likeable character in his first film, and is definitely a success. Betty Frankiss and George Mozart are supporting members of a competent cast."

Picture Show wrote: "Leonard Henry as the versatile potman is most entertaining, and Wally Patch makes an amusing landlord. Aileen Latham as the drudge Liz, who rises to barmaid and sings quite well, is well cast. The remainder of the players are good. Amusing entertainment."

Picturegoer wrote: "An artless comedy of London life which had possibilities which have not been well exploited. Its chief claim to your attention is the fact that it marks Leonard Henry's screen debut. He shows in this modest start that he has what it takes, and I hope he will soon branch out rather more ambitiously. ... The story has the virtue of being unpretentious and sincerely simple. What it lacks is good timing and polish. Leonard Henry puts his songs over well, but is inclined to force the comedy at times. Wally Patch is very good as the landlord, as is Mae Bacon as his wife."
