= The Flying Fifty-Five (novel) =

1922 novel by Edgar Wallace

- Author: Edgar Wallace
- Language: English
- Genre: Crime
- Publication date: 1922
- Publication place: United Kingdom
- Media type: Print

The Flying Fifty-Five is a 1922 sports mystery novel by the British writer Edgar Wallace set in the horse racing world.

== Film adaptations ==
It has been adapted for films twice: a 1924 British silent film of the same title and a 1939 sound remake Flying Fifty-Five directed by Reginald Denham.

== Bibliography ==
- Goble, Alan. The Complete Index to Literary Sources in Film. Walter de Gruyter, 1999.
