= The Flying Fifty-Five (1924 film) =

1924 film

- Directed by: A. E. Coleby
- Written by: A. E. Coleby
- Based on: The Flying Fifty-Five by Edgar Wallace
- Starring: Lionelle Howard; Frank Perfitt; Lionel d'Aragon
- Production company: Stoll Pictures
- Distributed by: Stoll Pictures
- Release date: November 1924
- Country: United Kingdom
- Languages: Silent; English intertitles

The Flying Fifty-Five is a 1924 British silent sports film directed by A. E. Coleby and starring Lionelle Howard, Frank Perfitt and Lionel d'Aragon. It is based on a 1922 novel of the same name by Edgar Wallace, and was remade as a sound film in 1939.

== Cast ==
- Lionelle Howard as Reggie Cambrey
- Stephanie Stephens as Stella Barrington
- Brian B. Lemon as Lord Fountwell
- Frank Perfitt as Joanh Urquhart
- Lionel d'Aragon as Sir Jacques Gregory
- Bert Darley as Honourable Claude Barrington
- Adeline Hayden Coffin as Aunt
- John Alexander as Jebson
- Johnny Butt
- Annie Esmond

== See also ==
- List of films about horses
- List of films about horse racing
