= Roy Faulkner (footballer, born 1935) =

English footballer

Personal information
- Full name: Roy Vincent Faulkner
- Date of birth: 28 June 1935 (age 91)
- Place of birth: Manchester, England
- Position: Inside forward

Senior career*
Years	Team	Apps	(Gls)
1955–1956	Manchester City	7	(4)
1957–1961	Walsall	100	(45)
- Wellington Town
Total		107	(49)
- * Club domestic league appearances and goals

Roy Faulkner (born 28 June 1935) is an English former footballer who played as an inside forward in the Football League for Manchester City and Walsall.

== Honours ==
with Walsall

- Football League Fourth Division champion: 1959–60
