= Underneath the Arches (radio programme) =

Documentary broadcast on BBC Radio London in 1977

Underneath the Arches is a documentary broadcast on BBC Radio London in 1977. The programme broke tradition by enabling London’s homeless people to tell their own stories. Underneath the Arches was presented by the homeless people themselves without any links from a programme presenter. Instead, short clips from catchy music hall songs were used to establish each location and, with careful editing, the interviewees related their own experiences and introduced each other.

The programme revealed that people became homeless for a variety of reasons. Some had been victims of poverty, some had been in prison and were having difficulty returning to mainstream society; others had been battling unsuccessfully against alcohol abuse or drug addiction, and some were suffering from mental illness. The documentary also highlighted the lack of appropriate services such as hostels, drop-in centres and advice services.

The unique presentation by producer Owen Spencer-Thomas won the Unda award for the best religious radio programme in 1977. He befriended many of the homeless people who featured in the documentary. Winning their confidence, he visited them as they prepared for another night sleeping rough on London's pavements. The publicity generated by the programme boosted funds for the "Crisis at Christmas" campaign and brought more volunteers to the charity which used a derelict church in Lambeth to house and feed homeless people during Christmas week each year in the 1970s. Underneath the Arches refers both to the railway arches at Charing Cross railway station where many homeless people have slept rough, and to the music hall song "Underneath the Arches".
