= Michael Busselle =

British photographer

- Born: 4 November 1935; Sevenoaks, Kent, England
- Died: 13 July 2006 (aged 70)
- Occupations: Photographer, Writer

Michael Busselle (4 November 1935 – 13 July 2006) was an English photographer and writer whose photographs and writing were featured in more than 50 books. His first book, Master Photography, has sold over a million copies worldwide.

== Career ==
Born in Sevenoaks, Kent, Busselle showed an early aptitude for portrait photography. Although he initially worked with the Ministry of Defence, in 1957 he quit his post to become a full-time photographer. The first few years of his career in photography consisted mainly of assistant positions with various London photography studios. Busselle eventually opened his own studio in Covent Garden in the early 1960s. Although successful with portrait and advertising assignments, by the 1980s he began to focus almost exclusively on travel and leisure photography, earning him several award-nominated compilations including The Wine Lover's Guide to France, runner-up for Wine Magazine's Book of the Year award, Landscape in Spain, runner-up in the Spanish Ministry of Tourism sponsored Otiz Ochague photography competition, and French Vineyards, an André Simon Book of the Year nominee.

Busselle was a fellow of the Royal Photographic Society and a regular contributor to several magazines such as The Sunday Express, Connoisseur and Atlantic Monthly. He also lectured and ran photography workshops.

== Personal life ==
Busselle pursued international travel whenever possible. He was married and had one child, a son.

== Selected bibliography ==
- Master Photography : Take and Make Perfect Pictures (1978) ISBN 0-528-81079-0
- Complete Guide to Photographing People (1983) ISBN 0-89586-292-1
- The Encyclopedia of Photography (1983) ISBN 0-7064-1741-0
- The Wine Lover's Guide to France (1986) ISBN 1-85145-005-X
- Landscape in Spain (1988) ISBN 1-85145-246-X
- The Complete 35mm Sourcebook (1992) ISBN 0-8174-3704-5
- Creative Digital Photography (2002) ISBN 0-8174-3730-4
- Photographing Landscapes and Gardens (2002) ISBN 2-88046-676-8
