= Les Savill =

English cricketer

Personal information
- Full name: Leslie Austin Savill
- Born: 30 June 1935 (age 91); Brentwood, Essex, England
- Batting: Right-handed

Domestic team information
- Years: Team
- 1953–1961: Essex
- 1964: Devon

Career statistics
Competition	First-class
Matches	125
Runs scored	3,919
Batting average	21.29
100s/50s	4/15
Top score	115
Balls bowled	12
Wickets	1
Bowling average	26.00
5 wickets in innings	–
10 wickets in match	–
Best bowling	1/26
Catches/stumpings	50/–
- Source: Cricinfo, 21 April 2011

Leslie 'Les' Austin Savill (born 30 June 1935) is a former English cricketer. Savill was a right-handed batsman whose bowling style is unknown. He was born in Brentwood, Essex.

Savill made his first-class debut for Essex against Glamorgan in the 1953 County Championship. He played first-class cricket for Essex more from 1953 to 1961, making 125 appearances, with his final appearance coming against Surrey. In his 125 appearances for the county, he scored 3,919 runs at a batting average of 21.29, with fifteen half centuries, four centuries and a high score of 115. His highest first-class score came against Cambridge University in 1959. Savill passed 1,000 runs for a season once, in 1959 when he scored 1,197 runs at an average of 32.35. His only first-class wicket was George Dews, who he dismissed for 130 when Essex played Worcestershire in 1959. His only bowling innings, which consisted of 2 overs was expensive, costing 26 runs.

Following the end of his first-class career, he played a single Minor Counties Championship match for Devon in 1964 against Berkshire.
