= Barry Livesey =

British actor (1905–1959)

- in They Were Sisters (1945)
- Born: Barrie Edwards Livesey; 1905; Barry, Vale of Glamorgan, Wales
- Died: 1959 (aged 53–54); Maidstone, Kent, England
- Occupation: Actor
- Parent(s): Sam Livesey; Margaret Ann Edwards

Barry Edwards Livesey (16 Oct 1905 in Barry, Vale of Glamorgan – 1959 in Maidstone, Kent) was a British stage and film actor. He was sometimes credited as Barrie Livesey. He was the son of Sam Livesey, the brother of actor Jack Livesey, and the cousin and step-brother of actor Roger Livesey.

== Filmography ==
Year	Title	Role	Notes
1921	The Old Curiosity Shop	Tom Scott	Film debut
1933	His Grace Gives Notice	Ted Burlington	
1933	Paris Plane	Minor Role	
1934	Something Always Happens	George Hamlin	
1935	Mr. Cohen Takes a Walk	Joe Levine	
1935	Breakers Ahead	George Kenyon	
1935	Variety	Victor Boyd	
1936	Rembrandt	Peasant Lad	
1945	They Were Sisters	Brian	Final film
