= Variety (1935 film) =

- Frame from the film
- Directed by: Adrian Brunel
- Written by: Adrian Brunel; Oswald Mitchell
- Produced by: John Argyle
- Starring: George Carney; Barry Livesey; Jack Livesey; Sam Livesey
- Cinematography: Desmond Dickinson
- Edited by: Daniel Birt
- Music by: Horace Sheldon
- Production company: Argyle Talking Pictures
- Distributed by: Butcher's Film Service
- Release date: March 1935
- Running time: 86 minutes
- Country: United Kingdom
- Language: English

Variety is a 1935 British musical film directed by Adrian Brunel and starring George Carney, Barry Livesey and Sam Livesey. It was written by Brunel and Oswald Mitchell. The film follows a revue show format, with a number of performers playing themselves, and was made at Cricklewood Studios.

== Preservation status ==
The British Film Institute National Archive holds a collection of ephemera and stills but no film or video materials.

== Plot ==
The film tells the story of the development of the variety theatre, showcasing many well-known variety artistes, from the old-time Music Hall of the 1890s to the modern day. The chronology is based on a tale of the fictional show business Boyd family, who run their own theatre called "Boyd's Empire", and linked to newsworthy national and international events.

== Cast ==
- George Carney
- Barry Livesey as Victor Boyd
- Cassie Livesey as Maggie Boyd
- Jack Livesey as Matt Boyd
- Sam Livesey as Charlie Boyd
- April Vivian as Joan
- Phyllis Robins
- The Sherman Fisher Girls as themselves
- Billy Cotton as himself
- Lily Morris as herself
- Horace Sheldon as himself
- Bertha Willmott as herself
- Olsen's sea lions
- The Houston Sisters
- and many more artistes (see)

== Reception ==
The Monthly Film Bulletin wrote: "The individual acts have been well chosen, and on the whole the film has been put together quite well. Judging from the Trade Show audience the most popular items of these are, Olsen's Sea Lions, the Houston Sisters, and Billy Cotton's Band. But there is good variety entertainment here. The photography and direction are good, but the acting of those concerned with the story is not all it might be."

Kine Weekly wrote: "Romance of the vaudeville stage, illustrating the rise, decline and rehabilitation of variety entertainment as witnessed by three generations of a family of showmen. The fashioning of the rich material does not reveal a great deal of imagination or originality, but it is so popular and topical that it is able to withstand the handicap of indifferent technique. The variety bill round which the picture is built, a big attraction in itself, contains a terrific list of top-line turns, and these are smoothly linked together by a simple story, the strength of which lies in its true assessment of the value of patriotic sentiment."

The Daily Film Renter wrote: "Cavalcade of English music hall from Chairman days of 1892 to modern highspeed variety. Slender story traces varying fortunes of family of showmen who adapt themselves to changing conditions to reap golden reward. ... Entertainment bid vested in series of excellent turns, most popular of which, at trade show, were Houston Sisters; Sam Barton, Olsens Sea Lions, Can-Can Dancers, Bobbie 'Uke' Henshaw, Billy Cotton and his Band, Nellie Wallace, Edward Victor's shadowgraphs, and actual news reel shots of Queen Victoria's Jubilee. Excellent popular attraction, with pronounced stellar pull."

pis
