= Bridget Jones (academic) =

British literary academic (1935–2000)

- Born: Bridget Heather Wheeler; 20 November 1935; London, England
- Died: 4 April 2000 (aged 64); Oxford, England
- Other names: Bridget Heather Jones, Bridget Wheeler Jones
- Education: Minchenden Grammar School
- Alma mater: Newnham College, Cambridge
- Occupations: Academic, writer
- Years active: 1963–1995
- Known for: introducing authors from the francophone Caribbean to French language and literature studies programs

Bridget Jones (20 November 1935 – 4 April 2000) was a British literary academic who pioneered the inclusion of Caribbean literature in European university studies programs. While teaching French literature at the University of the West Indies, Jones developed an interest in French Caribbean writing and developed one of the first PhD curricula focused on francophone Caribbean literature. Upon returning to England, she taught at the University of Reading and the Roehampton Institute. An annual award, distributed by the Society for Caribbean Studies, as well as a scholarship program, given by the University of the West Indies, are named in her honour.

== Early life ==
Bridget Heather Wheeler was born on 20 November 1935 in London to Kathleen and Ernest Wheeler. She attended Hazelwood Primary School and completed her secondary education at Minchenden Grammar School. Winning a scholarship to Newnham College, Cambridge, she went on to study French and Spanish, graduating with First-class honours in Medieval and Modern Languages Tripos. While at Cambridge she met, Donald Jones, a Jamaican student, studying chemical engineering, whom she would later marry. Wheeler spent 1958 in France, working as an assistant in Douai and then returned to London in 1959, to marry Jones and begin her PhD studies at King's College London under the tutelage of John M. Cocking.

== Career ==
In 1963, Jones' husband took a position at an oil refinery in Jamaica and the couple relocated to Kingston, where Jones took a position teaching Spanish at a boys' secondary school. With a group of theatre enthusiasts, Jones was among the founders of a film society and aired a weekly programme on the arts on the Jamaica Broadcasting Corporation radio channel. She also produced film reviews for The Sunday Gleaner and hosted legendary parties featuring local cuisine and music. After a year, she joined the faculty of the University of the West Indies (UWI), as a lecturer in the French Department.

Two years before, the University College of the West Indies, as it was then called, gained independence from the University of London, simultaneously with Jamaican and Trinidadian independence from the British colonial system. The press for decolonization led Jones, and other academics of her time, to investigate ways to include both language and literature from the Caribbean in her courses. Translations of various Creole languages, which had previously been omitted from dictionaries, began to be included in resources and works by francophone and Afro-Caribbean authors began to be added to curricula at the university. In 1967, Jones completed her PhD at King's College with her thesis Antonin Artaud, His Work and Literary Situation and was promoted to a senior lecturer. She worked with the team of academics preparing more inclusive syllabi and supervised the PhD studies of one of the first thesis projects, which explored French-Caribbean literature.

Jones' teaching on nineteenth- and twentieth-century French language and literature was supplemented by her publications which included works on Afro-, Anglo- and Franco-Caribbean literary figures. Her research focused on such writers as Léon Damas, René Depestre and Simone Schwarz-Bart, among others, and she compiled with Merle Hodge an anthology of francophone Caribbean poets. Developing an interest in folk culture, Jones served on the UWI faculty committee to develop programs around Caribbean folklore themes and wrote articles for the Folklore Bulletin. She was also involved with the university's theatre programme and organised productions of Afro- and French-Caribbean plays and recitations. In 1981, she began working with the Caribbean Examinations Council, conducting research into the qualifications required for degree certification.

Economic downturns in the 1970s and 1980s forced Jones' husband to look abroad for work. When he relocated to Saudi Arabia in 1982, Jones returned with the couple's two sons, Daniel and Matthew to England. Settling in Reading, she began work on a master's degree in applied linguistics, but was unable to secure work because of the economic recession. She continued publishing on francophone Caribbean literature, as well as theatre, and specifically focused studies, centered on French Guiana. In 1985 and 1986, she taught at the University of Reading and the following year was hired by the Roehampton Institute to teach in the department of modern languages. In 1989, Jones and other academics in the UK, founded the Association for the Study of Caribbean and African Literature in French (ASCALF), to promote the inclusion of literature from the Caribbean in higher education curricula.

In 1992, Jones was diagnosed with cancer and after treatment resulted in its remission, resumed her publishing and research trips to the French overseas Caribbean departments. She served as chair of ASCALF for the 1994 and 1995 term. Involved in the admissions to the languages department at Roehampton, Jones promoted international networking and organized programmes like Francophonie: mythes, masques et réalités, hosted in 1994, and Surréalisme et francophonie, held in 1997. Participating in international conferences, she assisted in developing materials on Afro- and Franco-Caribbean literature for symposiums such as the Institute of Germanic Studies, the Society for Caribbean Studies, and the Society for French Studies, among others. In the summer of 1995, her cancer returned, prompting Jones to retire and relocate to Oxford with her husband. In 1997, she co-authored with Sita Dickson Littlewood Paradoxes Of French Caribbean Theatre which was a major reference work indexing 400 plays written since 1900 in either French in Creole languages by authors from French Guiana, Guadeloupe, and Martinique.

== Death and legacy ==
Jones died on 4 April 2000 in Oxford. The optional curricula program she designed for inclusion of French Caribbean writers has become a mandatory course in the French literature department at UWI. A scholarship fund was established in her name for students studying French at UWI and in 2003, The Francophone Caribbean Today: Literature, Language, Culture was published as a tribute to her pioneering efforts to expand academic treatment of the Caribbean to literary studies programs. She is considered a pioneer in the development of francophone studies programs in the Caribbean, Ireland and the United Kingdom. The annual Bridget Jones Award is given by the Society for Caribbean Studies to "an arts practitioner from any region in the Caribbean to present their work at the Society's Annual Conference".

== Selected works ==
- Jones, Bridget (1974). "Léon Damas as Storyteller: 'Sur un air de guitare'". Black Images. 3 (3). Toronto, Canada: Black Images, Inc: 19–23. OCLC 29405854.
- Jones, Bridget (1975). "Some French Influences in the Fiction of Orlando Patterson". Savacou (11–12). Kingston, Jamaica: Caribbean Artists Movement: 27–38.
- Jones, Bridget (1977). "Love Poems". Arts Review. 2 (1–2). Mona, Jamaica: Creative Arts Centre, University of the West Indies: 62.
- Jones, Bridget (1979). "Léon Damas and His 'Riding Horse'". In Racine, Daniel L. (ed.). Léon-Gontran Damas, 1912–1978, Founder of Negritude: A Memorial Casebook. Washington, D.C.: University Press of America. pp. 227–232. ISBN 978-0-819-10727-5.
- Jones, Bridget (1980). "Seven Poems". In Mordecai, Pamela; Morris, Mervyn (eds.). Jamaica Woman: An Anthology of Poems. London, England: Heinemann. pp. 45–48. ISBN 043-598-600-7.
- Jones, Bridget (December 1981). "Comrade Eros: The Erotic Vein in the Writing of René Depestre". Caribbean Quarterly. 27 (4). Mona, Jamaica: The University of the West Indies: 21–30. doi:10.1080/00086495.1981.11671991. ISSN 0008-6495. OCLC 5547329079.
- Jones, Bridget (1982). "Introduction". In Schwarz-Bart, Simone (ed.). The Bridge of Beyond. Translated by Barbara Bray. London, England: Heinemann. pp. iv–xviii. ISBN 043-598-770-4.
- Jones, Bridget (1986). "Theatre in the French West Indies". Carib (4): 35–54.
- Jones, Bridget (translator); Clitandre, Pierre (1987). Cathedral of the August Heat. London, England: Readers International. ISBN 093-052-330-X.
- Jones, Bridget (translator); Charles, Faustin, ed. (1989). "Alex-Louise Tessonneau's 'Little Girl Saved by her Father'". Under the Storyteller's Spell: Caribbean Folk Tales. London, England: Viking Kestrel Penguin Group. pp. 117–127. ISBN 067-082-276-0.
- Jones, Bridget; Stephenson, E. (1994). "Politique et société à la Guyane". In Burton, Richard; Réno, Fred (eds.). Les Antilles-Guyane au rendez-vous de l'Europe: le grand tournant?. Paris, France: Economica. pp. 101–121. ISBN 978-2-717-82544-2.
- Jones, Bridget; Littlewood, Sita E. Dickson (1998). Paradoxes of French Caribbean Theatre: An annotated checklist of dramatic works—Guadeloupe, Guyane, Martinique from 1900. London, England: Department of Modern Languages, Roehampton Institute. ISBN 978-1-871-95483-8.
