= Leonard Henry (comedian) =

Comedian and broadcaster (1890–1973)

- Born: Leonard Henry Ruming; 15 March 1890; Lambeth, London, England
- Died: 6 January 1973 (aged 82); London, England
- Occupations: Comedian, broadcaster
- Years active: 1912–1969

Leonard Henry Ruming (15 March 1890 – 6 January 1973), known as Leonard Henry, was an English comedian, actor, and radio broadcaster.

== Biography ==
Born in Lambeth, London, he first performed as a comic entertainer in concert parties in 1912. He made his first radio broadcast in 1926, and thereafter appeared regularly on the BBC. He also played in pantomimes, variety shows, and Shakespeare plays.

He was known for monologues containing comic non sequiturs, funny voices and noises, and increasingly outlandish lists, for instance of those attending a function. He was the first person to blow a raspberry on British radio, and was also reputed to be able to make an impromptu joke on any subject suggested by his audience. He wrote and starred in his own revues, including Humouresque and April Foolishness, and was a regular performer in Charlot's Hour, the first regular weekly light entertainment programme on British radio, starting in 1928. He hosted the radio version of the 1932 Royal Command Performance. He was one of the most popular British radio comedians of the early 1930s, and was twice voted top in a newspaper poll of favourite radio personalities.

He appeared in short films, and in the longer films The Musical Beauty Shop (1930) and The Public Life of Henry the Ninth (1935). The latter film, now lost, in which Henry took the leading role, was the first one to be made by Hammer Film Productions.

He also composed songs, and continued to appear regularly on BBC radio as a comedian and later as a compere of programmes, including Housewives' Choice. His autobiography, My Laugh Story, was published in 1937. In 1969, he was still well enough known to be the featured guest on Desert Island Discs.

Leonard Henry died in London in 1973, aged 82.
