= Lend Me Your Husband (1935 film) =

- Directed by: Frederick Hayward
- Written by: Randall Faye; Michael Trevellian
- Produced by: Randall Faye; George King
- Starring: John Stuart; Nora Swinburne; Nancy Burne
- Cinematography: Geoffrey Faithfull
- Edited by: John Seabourne Sr.
- Production company: Embassy Pictures
- Distributed by: RKO Pictures
- Release date: 18 November 1935
- Running time: 61 minutes
- Country: United Kingdom
- Language: English

Lend Me Your Husband is a 1935 British comedy film directed by Frederick Hayward and starring John Stuart, Nora Swinburne and Nancy Burne. It was written by Randall Faye and Michael Trevellian, and was made at Walton Studios as a quota quickie. The film's sets were designed by the art director Don Russell.

== Synopsis ==
Jeff Green is in love with his friend Tony's wife, Ba-Ba, and plans to run away with her. Jeff is already married himself, to Virgie, who discovers his plan but lets him go, confident that a week in Ba-Ba's company will cure his infatuation. In the farcical confusion which follows, involving an imagined kidnapping, it does.

== Cast ==
- John Stuart as Jeff Green
- Nora Swinburne as Virgie Green
- Nancy Burne as Ba-Ba
- Annie Esmond as mother
- Evan Thomas as Tony

== Reception ==
The Monthly Film Bulletin wrote: "The plot is well handled and endless complications keep the story going. The acting throughout is competent and although the direction is unimaginative it is adequate. Despite the theme there is nothing indelicate in the treatment. Quite an amusing farce."

Kine Weekly wrote: "Marital comedy, a tiresome conversation piece, unoriginal in design and verbal decoration. Talk, talk, talk from beginning to end, and feeble talk at that, it has little claim to serious consideration as a booking proposiion on any grounds other than that represented by its quota ticket."

The Daily Film Renter wrote: "Artless narrative develops along lines of ingenuous knockabout, with acting of exaggerated type. Has a few mild laughs, but mainly a booking on quota value. ... It is an obvious story of a type that has been done before – and to much better effect."
