= Underneath the Arches (film) =

1937 film

- Directed by: Redd Davis
- Written by: Alison Booth; H. Fowler Mear
- Produced by: Julius Hagen
- Starring: Bud Flanagan; Chesney Allen; Stella Moya; Lyn Harding
- Cinematography: Sydney Blythe
- Music by: William Trytel
- Production company: Twickenham Studios
- Distributed by: Wardour Films
- Release date: 23 February 1937
- Running time: 72 minutes
- Country: United Kingdom
- Language: English

Underneath the Arches is a 1937 British comedy film directed by Redd Davis and starring Bud Flanagan, Chesney Allen, Stella Moya, Lyn Harding and Edmund Willard. It was written by Alison Booth and H. Fowler Mear, and was made by Julius Hagen's Twickenham Studios.

== Synopsis ==
Two down-on-their-luck Englishmen travel by ship to a South American country where they foil one revolution, and then accidentally start another.

== Cast ==
- Bud Flanagan as Bud
- Chesney Allen as Ches
- Stella Moya as Anna
- Lyn Harding as Pedro
- Edmund Willard as Chief Steward
- Enid Stamp-Taylor as Dolores
- Edward Ashley as Carlos
- Aubrey Mather as Professor

== Reception ==
The Monthly Film Bulletin wrote: "Inconsequential comedy ... The thin story is held together by the amusing idiosyncracies of Flanagan and Allen. Flanagan's natural humour overrides what might otherwise be serious breaks in the development. It is his performance that makes the film first class entertainment of its kind."

Kine Weekly wrote: "Boisterous, crazy comedy extravaganza, presenting a fairly popular compromise between raw humour and rough stuff. The gags and situations are not particularly original, nor is the story designed to link them together written with any great regard for continuity or showmanship but Flanagan and Allen, rough and ready as their methods are, know their public. Their artless ribald fooling promotes sufficient hearty fun to get the film over with the masses."

The Daily Film Renter wrote: "It is perhaps appropriate that this effort provides Flanagan and Allen with material of a 'crazy' type, although it seems a pity a stronger story could not have been selected. ... Production is adequate to story demands, and direction in keeping with the spirit of the thing. Followers of Flanagan and Allen will probably find the picture quite amusing."
