= Dandy Dick (film) =

1935 British film by William Beaudine

- Opening titles
- Directed by: William Beaudine
- Written by: William Beaudine; Clifford Grey; Will Hay; Frank Miller; Arthur Wing Pinero
- Produced by: Walter C. Mycroft
- Starring: Will Hay; Nancy Burne
- Cinematography: Jack Parker
- Production company: British International Pictures Ltd.
- Distributed by: Wardour Films
- Release date: March 1935 (UK)
- Running time: 70 min
- Country: United Kingdom
- Language: English

Dandy Dick is a 1935 British comedy film directed by William Beaudine and starring Will Hay, Nancy Burne and Esmond Knight. It was written by Beaudine, Clifford Grey, Hay and Frank Miller based on the 1887 play Dandy Dick by Arthur Wing Pinero. It is the second and last of Hay's films to be based on a play by Pinero, the first being Those Were the Days.

== Plot ==
A vicar who lives in the country with his daughter and grandson discovers he owns a share in a racehorse. He must now put his principles aside and attempt to save the church by gambling. A doping scandal ensues.

== Cast ==
- Will Hay as the Reverend Richard Jedd
- Nancy Burne as Pamela Jedd
- Esmond Knight as Tony Mardon
- Davy Burnaby as Sir William Mardon
- Mignon O'Doherty as Georgiana Jedd
- Wally Patch as Police Constable Topping
- Moore Marriott as stableboy (uncredited)

== Production ==
Filming took place from October to November 1934 at Elstree Studios, and a sequence where the vicar is arrested was shot in front of the Shenley Road Police Station.

== Reception ==
Kine Weekly wrote: "The simple plot is happily contrived, and its amusing situations, set in an appropriate and refreshingly English atmosphere, are put over in the right spirit by Will Hay and a sound supporting cast. The direction is not marked by great resource or imagination, nor are the technical qualities outstanding, but the disarming artlessness of the show, quietly expressed through the author's technical skill, is such as to make it a most agreeable proposition for the majority of halls. It should appeal particularly to the family."

The Daily Film Renter wrote: "Will Hay does very well as the vicar, bringing a great deal of his well-known music hall comicalities to bear upon the part, which offers him ample scope for his talents."

Picturegoer wrote: "As the good-natured but unsophisticated and impecunious village clergyman, the popular vaudeville artist not only reveals an excellent sense of comedy characterisation, but a screen personality that is both interesting and unconsciously ingratiating."
