= A Fire Has Been Arranged =

- Opening titles
- Directed by: Leslie S. Hiscott
- Screenplay by: H. Fowler Mear; Michael Barringer
- Story by: H. Fowler Mear; James A. Carter
- Produced by: Julius Hagen
- Starring: Chesney Allen; Bud Flanagan; Harold French
- Cinematography: Sydney Blythe
- Edited by: Michael C. Chorlton
- Music by: W.L. Trytel
- Release date: 1935
- Running time: 70 minutes
- Country: United Kingdom
- Language: English

A Fire Has Been Arranged is a 1935 British comedy film directed by Leslie S. Hiscott and starring Chesney Allen, Bud Flanagan and Alastair Sim. The screenplay was by H. Fowler Mear and Michael Barringer from a story by Mear and James A. Carter. It was made at Twickenham Studios. The film ends with the song "Where the Arches Used To Be".

== Plot ==
After a spell in prison three criminals return to recover their loot only to find the place where they have stashed it has been turned into a department store. They take jobs at the store in order to locate the whereabouts of their loot. The three discover that the unscrupulous managers of the store, Shuffle and Cutte, are keen to be accomplices in their plot.

== Cast ==
- Chesney Allen as Ches
- Bud Flanagan as Bud
- Hal Walters as Hal
- Harold French as Toby
- Mary Lawson as Betty
- Alastair Sim as Cutte
- C. Denier Warren as Shuffle
- Robb Wilton as Oswald
- Vincent Holman as ex-detective
- Jack Vyvian as prison warder
- The Buddy Bradley Rhythm Girls as shop girls

== Reception ==
The Monthly Film Bulletin wrote: "Farce, with some music, about a couple of amiable crooks who hide some loot in a field only to find on their release from prison ten years later that suburbia has engulfed their field. This idea, amusing and full of possibilities in itself, is adorned with one or two musical numbers and frequent bursts of repartee which are irrelevant to the main idea. Some of the 'gags' are very clever and really funny and the director, wisely perhaps in the circumstances, has allowed Flanagan and Allen to have very much their own way. Alastair Sim is a menacing villain in appropriately melodramatic vein, and Mary Lawson and Robb Wilton make all-too-short appearances."

Kine Weekly wrote: "Robust comedy, a picture which relays music-hall humour to the screen without loss of laughs. ... The principal comedians know their public, and by playing to the gallery with an unfailing touch they leave no doubt as to the ability of the crazy entertainment to register."

The Daily Film Renter wrote: "Inconsequential story fashioned to exploit crazy antics of comedians, who put over familiar 'business' with gusto. Occasional song numbers, interludes of chorine high-stepping, and amusing support by Alastair Sim and Robb Wilton help to keep ball rolling, while realistic blaze forms climax. Good, robust comedy fare for the masses, with unmistakable stellar pull."
