= The Londonderry Air (film) =

- Phyllis Ryan and Liam Gaffney in the film
- Directed by: Alex Bryce
- Written by: Alex Bryce; David Evans
- Based on: The Londonderry Air by Rachel Field
- Produced by: Victor M. Greene
- Starring: Sara Allgood; Liam Gaffney; Phyllis Ryan
- Production company: Fox-British Pictures
- Release date: 1938
- Country: United Kingdom
- Language: English

The Londonderry Air is a 1938 British comedy romance film directed by Alex Bryce and starring Sara Allgood, Liam Gaffney and Phyllis Ryan. It was written by Bryce and David Evans based on the play of the same title by Rachel Field.

== Plot summary ==
A young woman abandons her plans to settle down in a respectable marriage and runs off with a travelling fiddler she falls in love with.

== Cast ==
- Sara Allgood as Widow Rafferty
- Liam Gaffney as The Pedlar
- Phyllis Ryan as Rose Martha
- Jimmy Mageean as Sheamus
- Maureen Moore as Mrs. Murphy
- Grenville Darling as auctioneer
- Kitty Kirwan as deaf woman

== Reception ==
The Monthly Film Bulletin wrote: "The contrast between the everyday task, the common round and the gay wandering life of the pedlar is well-drawn. The unpleasantness of the former is accentuated by the domineering, nagging Widow, whose acidity is insufficiently balanced by the easy-going, weak, stolid but kindly Sheamus. The theme is light and familiar, but the acting is good, especially that of Phyllis Ryan as Rose, and the direction has an engaging freshness about it. The dialogue is crisp and the photography good."

Kine Weekly wrote: "Rural Irish comedy with familiar village types and the minimum amount of plot, but sufficient sincerity and authenticity to provide fair entertainment. ... The strength of this production lies in the casting. Sara Allgood dominates the film by her performance as the Widow Rafferty, the manner in which she instills charm into an unattractive character being worthy of a better object. Liam Gaffney is a genuine discovery as the happy-go-lucky pedlar, and employs an agreeable tenor voice to advantage, while Jimmy McGeean and Phyllis Ryan contribute convincing studies of Sheamus and Rose Martha."

The Daily Film Renter wrote: "Song interludes, moderately amusing party scene and village auction characterisations represent major points of appeal in otherwise uneventful development. Adequate acting, direction and settings. ... The script is overburdened with dialogue, a lot of it couched in the idiom of traditional Irish whimsy."

Picture Show wrote: "There is almost no action, a great deal of talk, and yet it is directed and acted with sympathy and understanding, and has some beautiful Irish exterior scenes."

Picturegoer wrote: "A very slight plot introduces familiar village types and meanders along pleasantly enough in a naive manner. Sara Allgood dominates the picture as the Widow Rafferty ... Liam Gaffney is good as the pedlar and has an agreeable tenor voice. The character drawing on which the entertainment relies is not bad."
