= Irish and Proud of It =

Irish and Proud of It may refer to:

- King Kelly of the U.S.A., a 1934 American film often known by this title
- Irish and Proud of It (film), a 1938 Irish film
