= Inside the Lines =

Inside the Lines may refer to:

- Inside the Lines (1918 film), an American silent thriller film
- Inside the Lines (1930 film), an American pre-Code spy drama film
- "Inside the Lines", a 2016 song by Swedish DJ Mike Perry
