= Against the Tide (1937 film) =

1937 British film by Alex Bryce

- Frame from the film
- Directed by: Alex Bryce
- Screenplay by: Alex Bryce; David Evans
- Story by: Reginald Pound
- Produced by: Victor M. Green
- Starring: Robert Cochran: Cathleen Nesbitt; Linden Travers
- Cinematography: Ronald Neame
- Edited by: Challis Sanderson
- Production companies: Fox-British Pictures; Victor M. Greene Productions
- Distributed by: Twentieth Century Fox Film Company (UK)
- Release date: 20 September 1937 (UK)
- Running time: 67 minutes
- Country: United Kingdom
- Language: English

Against the Tide is a 1937 British drama film directed by Alex Bryce and starring Robert Cochran, Cathleen Nesbitt and Linden Travers. It was written by Bryce and David Evans from a story by Reginald Pound.

== Plot ==
A Cornish fishing village is struck by a tragedy.

== Cast ==
- Cathleen Nesbitt as Margaret Leigh
- Robert Cochran as Jim Leigh
- Linden Travers as Mary Poole
- Jimmy Mageean as Tom Jenkins
- Herbert Cameron as William Poole
- Neil Carlton as Bert Poole
- Dorothy Vernon as Mrs Brewer

== Critical reception ==
The Monthly Film Bulletin wrote: "The story does not rise to tragic heights, but remains on the lower level of pathos. The characterisation is good; the bitterness of the older people is marked, but this is counterbalanced by the rough kindness of Jimmy Macgeean [sic] who helps the young couple in many ways. Cathleen Nesbitt gives an excellent performance as Margaret and the supporting cast is good."

Kine Weekly wrote: "The acting is competent and the atmosphere, apart from a poor attempt at culminating spectacle, is convincing, but the plot is a little too obvious in its dénouement to point any particular moral. Primarily a dramatic conversation piece, the film is no more than a fair average quota booking. ... Cathleen Nesbitt is very good as Margaret Leigh; she acts with natural power, and Linden Travers earns sympathy as Mary, but Robert Cochran is decidedly weak as Jim; his performance lacks balance."

Picturegoer wrote: "There is some quite good character drawing in this picture, but it is too obvious in its development and weak in its attempt at spectacle to be at all widely appealing. Robert Cochran is weak as the hero, the son of a fisherman whose mother refuses to let him go to sea and is jealous of his love for the daughter of another fisherman. Cathleen Nesbitt is, however, very good as his mother and Linden Travers adequate as the girl with whom he falls in love."

Picture Show wrote: "The atmosphere of the village is finely caught. Unusual entertainment."
