= Passenger to London =

1937 film

- Directed by: Lawrence Huntington
- Written by: David Evans
- Produced by: Lawrence Huntington
- Starring: John Warwick; Jenny Laird; Nigel Barrie
- Cinematography: Stanley Grant
- Edited by: Peter Tanner
- Music by: Charles Cowlrick
- Production company: Fox British Pictures
- Distributed by: Twentieth Century Fox
- Release date: June 1937
- Running time: 57 minutes
- Country: United Kingdom
- Language: English

Passenger to London (also known as The Black Trunk) is a 1937 British espionage thriller film directed by Lawrence Huntington and starring John Warwick, Jenny Laird and Nigel Barrie. It was written by David Evans.

== Plot ==
On board a continental express, British secret service agent Carlton hides valuable documents in a trunk belonging to fellow passenger Barbara Lane. When Carlton is murdered in London, Government agent Frank Drayton sets out to retrieve the papers and rescue Barbara, who has been drawn into the intrigue.

== Cast ==
- John Warwick as Frank Drayton
- Jenny Laird as Barbara Lane
- Paul Neville as Vautel
- Ivan Wilmot as Veinberg
- Aubrey Pollock as Sir James Garfield
- Victor Hagen as Carlton
- Nigel Barrie as Sir Donald Frame
- Sybil Brooke as Miss Park
- Dorothy Dewhurst as Manageress

== Production ==
It was shot at Wembley Studios in London as a quota quickie by the British subsidiary of Twentieth Century Fox.

== Reception ==
Kine Weekly wrote: "Opening sequences on the Continental train are well done, but too slow for full dramatic effect; the cheap hotel is quite well suggested, but the stock characters, uninspired dialogue, obtrusive and background music rob it of any chance to be convincing. There are some good! directorial touches, especially in the continuity."

The Daily Film Renter wrote: "Action packs fair quota of thrills, even though development is far-fetched and plot machinations appear somewhat confected, while effective settings include continental express. Useful supporting feature for definitely popular patronage."

Picturegoer considered the storyline as "too obvious" and the film being "too slow to be fully effective".

In British Sound Films: The Studio Years 1928–1959 David Quinlan rated the film as "poor", writing: "Good settings, but otherwise feeble thriller."
