= False Evidence =

False Evidence may refer to:

- False evidence, information created or obtained illegally, to sway the verdict in a court case
- False Evidence (1919 film), 1919 American silent drama film directed by Edwin Carewe
- False Evidence (1922 film), 1922 British silent film directed by Harold M. Shaw
- False Evidence (1937 film), 1937 British crime film directed by Donovan Pedelty
