= David Evans (writer) =

British screenwriter (1893–1966)

- Born: 7 August 1893; Wales, United Kingdom
- Died: 20 May 1966 (Aged 72); Los Angeles, California, United States
- Occupation: Writer
- Years active: 1934–1961 (film & TV)

David Evans (August 7, 1893 – May 20, 1966) was a British screenwriter and novelist. He entered the British film industry during the 1930s where he worked on a number of quota quickies. During the 1940s he was employed on several more prestigious films such as Terence Fisher's Portrait from Life (1948). From the mid-1950s he switched to the United States working on a final screenplay Strange Intruder (1956) before switching to television.

== Selected filmography ==
- Boomerang (1934)
- You Must Get Married (1936)
- Landslide (1937)
- Against the Tide (1937)
- Macushla (1937)
- Wise Guys (1937)
- Passenger to London (1937)
- Member of the Jury (1937)
- There Was a Young Man (1937)
- The Five Pound Man (1937)
- Murder in the Family (1938)
- The Londonderry Air (1938)
- Second Thoughts (1938)
- Irish and Proud of It (1938)
- The Villiers Diamond (1938)
- Who Goes Next? (1938)
- What Would You Do, Chums? (1939)
- I'll Turn to You (1946)
- This Man Is Mine (1946)
- When You Come Home (1948)
- The Three Weird Sisters (1948)
- Snowbound (1948)
- Portrait from Life (1949)
- Midnight Episode (1950)
- Once a Sinner (1950)
- The Late Edwina Black (1951)
- The Third Visitor (1951)
- Strange Intruder (1956)

== Bibliography ==
- Goble, Alan. The Complete Index to Literary Sources in Film. Walter de Gruyter, 1999.
- Nelmes, Jill. The Screenwriter in British Cinema. Bloomsbury Publishing, 2019.
