= Donisthorpe (surname) =

Donisthorpe is a surname. Notable people with the surname include:

- Horace Donisthorpe (1870–1951), British myrmecologist and coleopterist
- Richard Donisthorpe, (fl. 1797) (usually Richard Donisthorp), English clockmaker
- Wordsworth Donisthorpe (1847–1914), English individualist, anarchist and inventor
- Martin Donisthorpe Armstrong, English writer
- G. Sheila Donisthorpe (1898-1946), English novelist and playwright
