= The Luck of the Irish (1936 film) =

- Directed by: Donovan Pedelty
- Written by: Donovan Pedelty; Victor Haddick (novel)
- Produced by: Victor M. Greene; Richard Hayward; Donovan Pedelty
- Starring: Richard Hayward; Kay Walsh
- Cinematography: James Wilson
- Music by: Hubert Bath
- Production company: Crusade Films
- Distributed by: Paramount British Pictures
- Release date: 15 September 1936
- Running time: 80 minutes
- Country: United Kingdom
- Language: English

The Luck of the Irish is a British drama film directed by Donovan Pedelty, who also co-wrote the screenplay, and starring Richard Hayward and Kay Walsh. It is based on a novel by Victor Haddick.

It was made as a quota film at Elstree Studios. The production company Crusade Films had a contract to supply films for release by the British subsidiary of Paramount Pictures. The film's sets were designed by the art director Andrew Mazzei.

== Plot ==
An Irishman tries to save his ancestral home through the fortunes of a racehorse.

== Cast ==
- Richard Hayward as Sam Mulhern
- Nan Cullen as Widow Whistler
- Charles Fagan as Sergeant Doyle
- Meta Grainger as Lady O'Donnel
- Harold Griffin as Simon Reid
- John M. Henderson as Sir Richard O'Donnel
- R. H. MacCandless as Gavin Grogan
- Niall MacGinnis as Derek O'Neill
- Jimmy Mageean as Sir Brian O'Neill
- Charlotte Tedlie as Hortense O'Neill
- Kay Walsh as Eileen O'Donnel

== Bibliography ==
- Wood, Linda. British Films, 1927-1939. British Film Institute, 1986.
