= The Living Room (play) =

1953 play by Graham Greene

- Heinemann first edition: Dorothy Tutin & Eric Portman in the original production
- Original language: English
- Written by: Graham Greene
- Genre: Drama

Premiere
- Date: 10 February 1953
- Place: Lyceum Theatre, Edinburgh

The Living Room is a 1953 play by Graham Greene.

== Synopsis ==
The play consists of two acts, each of two scenes and is set entirely in the living room of Rose Pemberton and her two elderly aunts who live with the aunts' brother James, a disabled Roman Catholic priest. The aunts have a long-running fear of death in the house, with any bedroom being locked away from further use following a death of its resident family member. The story revolves around the introduction of Rose's new lover, Michael Dennis, to the family. It later transpires that Michael is married when his suicidal wife arrives at the house.

== Premiere ==
After premiering at the Lyceum Theatre in Edinburgh it transferred to the West End where it ran for 308 performances at Wyndham's Theatre between 16 April 1953 and 9 January 1954.

=== Original cast ===
- Mary, the daily woman – Dorothy Dewhurst
- Michael Dennis – John Robinson
- Rose Pemberton – Dorothy Tutin
- Miss Teresa Browne – Mary Jerrold
- Miss Helen Browne – Violet Farebrother
- Father James Browne – Eric Portman
- Mrs Dennis – Valerie Taylor

== Broadway ==
Greene premiered the play in North America at the Crest Theatre in Toronto, Canada in October 1954, starring Frances Hyland. A Broadway production then followed in November 1954 at Henry Miller's Theatre, where it ran for just 22 performances.

=== Broadway cast ===
- Mary, the daily woman – Hazel Jones
- Michael Dennis – Michael Goodliffe
- Rose Pemberton – Barbara Bel Geddes
- Miss Teresa Browne – Nora Nicholson
- Miss Helen Browne – Ann Shoemaker
- Father James Browne – Walter Fitzgerald
- Mrs Dennis – Carol Goodner

== Critical reception ==
The Sunday Express found the drama's central relationship "basically revolting," though concluded that the play would run and run, "because nothing is so appealing to a British audience as sex with an odour of sanctity and the glow of highbrowism"; whereas despite reservations, Kenneth Tynan called it "the best first play of its generation." The New York Times however, noted "a literate and rather bloodless drama...Although dramatic form often eludes novelists who are used to more time and space, Mr. Greene has made the transition competently."

== Revivals ==
The Living Room was revived at the Jermyn Street Theatre in March 2013, with a cast including Christopher Timothy and Tuppence Middleton.

== Bibliography ==
- Wearing, J.P. The London Stage 1950–1959: A Calendar of Productions, Performers, and Personnel. Rowman & Littlefield, 2014.
