= The Villiers Diamond =

1938 film

- Opening title
- Directed by: Bernard Mainwaring
- Screenplay by: David Evans; Ernest Dudley
- Story by: F. Wyndham Mallock
- Produced by: John Findlay
- Starring: Edward Ashley; Evelyn Ankers; Frank Birch
- Cinematography: Stanley Grant
- Distributed by: Twentieth Century Fox
- Release date: 1938
- Running time: 50 minutes
- Country: United Kingdom
- Language: English

The Villiers Diamond is a 1938 British crime film directed by Bernard Mainwaring and starring Edward Ashley, Evelyn Ankers and Frank Birch. It was written by David Evans and Ernest Dudley from a story by F. Wyndham Mallock. The screenplay concerns a man who is threatened with scandal when he accidentally acquires a stolen diamond.

== Plot ==
Silas Wade, having fraudulently obtained the legendary Villiers Diamond, is cornered by his former accomplice, Herbert Barker. Barker demands his cut of the proceeds, but Wade has not yet managed to sell the diamond. Then Wade's niece Joan arrives unexpectedly, having been expelled from her finishing school, and demands the trust-fund money that her uncle has already secretly squandered. In need of cash, Wade hires Barker as his "butler" and hatches a plot to stage a burglary of his less valuable jewellery, in order to collect the insurance money. He invites four desperate individuals recruited from a newspaper's personal column, intending to frame one of them for the theft. But his plan backfires. The guest Wade has chosen as the scapegoat is actually Joan's fiancé, Alan O'Connel, and another guest turns out to be Captain Dawson of Scotland Yard. Wade and Barker are arrested, and the Villiers Diamond is recovered.

== Cast ==
- Edward Ashley as Captain Dawson
- Evelyn Ankers as Joan Raymond
- Frank Birch as Silas Wade
- Liam Gaffney as Alan O'Connel
- Leslie Harcourt as Henry Barker
- Julie Suedo as Mrs Forbes
- Sybil Brooke as Miss Waring
- Bill Shine as Joe
- Margaret Davidge as Mrs. Benson
- Anita Sharp-Bolster as Mlle. Dulac

== Reception ==
The Monthly Film Bulletin wrote: "An amusing story with several surprises and no unpleasantness, while the acting especially of Miss Evelyn Ankers has charm."

Kine Weekly wrote: "Tame type of crime drama with low-comedy trimmings. The anaemic plot is hindered rather than helped by undue restraint on the part of the cast. Such thin material as is here unspooled needs far more robust – not to say exaggerated – acting to get it over. Mild interest, coupled now and then with frank incredulity, is the utmost the film is likely to create."

The Daily Film Renter wrote: "The plot is somewhat weak throughout and the action stilted, but the cast is adequate for the story, which has limited appeal."

TV Guide called it "a vapid crime story."
