= Men Like These =

1931 film directed by Walter Summers

Men like These
- Theatrical release poster
- Directed by: Walter Summers
- Screenplay by: Walter Summers
- Starring: John Batten; Athol Fleming; Sydney Seaward; Syd Crossley; James Enstone; Lesley Wareing
- Cinematography: Jack Parker
- Edited by: Leslie Norman
- Production company: British International Pictures
- Release date: 30 May 1932
- Running time: 63 minutes
- Country: United Kingdom
- Language: English

Men Like These (also known as Trapped in a Submarine) is a 1932 British drama film directed and written by Walter Summers and starring John Batten, Sydney Seaward, Syd Crossley, James Enstone and Lesley Wareing.

== Plot summary ==
A number of men are trapped underwater in the L56 submarine and through their comradeship and devotion to duty finally manage to escape.

== Cast ==
- John Batten
- Syd Crossley
- James Enstone
- Edward Gee
- John Hunt as Commander
- Sydney Seaward
- Charles Peachey
- Lesley Wareing as wife
- Athol Fleming as Lieutenant

== Reception ==
Kine Weekly wrote: "The whole thing is so real that it is difficult to apply the acting test to the members of the cast. But in deference to genius one must pick out one or two of the artistes as outstanding. Sidney Seaward, for example, as the petty officer who controls the seven men apparently doomed to death, is excellent. His acting is not so much a display of histrionics as the reaction of a great tragic crisis. No less good is John Batten as the young boy who féars death and is constrained to show it. ... We should be very grateful that a man like Walter Summers has been chosen to deal with a subject of this sort. He has avoided melodramatics and made a picture that shows with a wealth of realism the dangers that beset those employed in the submarine service."

Film Weekly wrote: "Men Like These is a worthy picture, made so by the extremely capable handling of its director, Walter Summers, to whom the greater part of the credit for success must go. ... Only one thing mars the strength of the drama, and that is not so much the dialogue, which some have called banal, but which, after all, is natural to such men, as the insistence upon patriotism and 'being British', which is the one false theatrical note in the film's stark realism."

Picturegoer wrote: "I do not hesitate to call this thrilling picture of a submarine disaster, with its fine depiction of courage and devotion to duty, a masterpiece of pictorial realism. ... the characters are wonderfully drawn; they do not so much act as live their parts. An especially noteworthy performance is given by John Batten as a young boy who fears death and, though showing it, manages finally to reassert his manhood. ... You will come away from this picture with a perfectly justifiable pride in your countrymen which is augmented by the clever treatment and avoidance of theatricality."

Variety wrote: "Before they had half finished this one, British International discovered the Admiralty would not allow any publicity connection to be drawn between the film and the Poseidon submarine disaster, on which the film is obviously based. As such, B. I. found a titleless film and a lot of explanations, They solved the title problem by asking the flicker critics to suggest names, and the title above was adopted, the words occurring twice during descriptive passages in the dialog. ... It struck this reviewer as a first class piece of work, marred somewhat by some mock-heroics here and there in the dialog."
