= The Early Bird (1936 film) =

1936 British film by Donovan Pedelty

- Directed by: Donovan Pedelty
- Written by: J. McGregor Douglas (play); Donovan Pedelty
- Produced by: Victor M. Greene
- Starring: Richard Hayward; Jimmy Mageean; Charlotte Tedlie; Myrtle Adams
- Cinematography: Jim Burger
- Edited by: Sam Simmonds
- Music by: Al Bollington
- Production company: Crusade Films
- Distributed by: Paramount Pictures
- Release date: August 1936
- Running time: 69 minutes
- Country: United Kingdom
- Language: English

The Early Bird is a 1936 British comedy film directed by Donovan Pedelty and starring Richard Hayward, Jimmy Mageean and Charlotte Tedlie.

== Production ==
The film was made at Highbury Studios and in Northern Ireland. It was a quota quickie produced for distribution by the American studio Paramount Pictures. The film's sets were designed by art director George Provis.

== Cast ==
- Richard Hayward as Daniel Duff
- Jimmy Mageean as Charlie Simpson
- Charlotte Tedlie as Mrs. Gordon
- Myrtle Adams as Lizzie
- Nan Cullen as Mrs. Madill
- Elma Hayward as Susan Duff
- Terence Grainger as Archie Macready
- Charles Fagan as Harold Gordon

== Bibliography ==
- Chibnall, Steve. Quota Quickies: The British of the British 'B' Film. British Film Institute, 2007.
- Low, Rachael. Filmmaking in 1930s Britain. George Allen & Unwin, 1985.
- Wood, Linda. British Films, 1927-1939. British Film Institute, 1986.
