= Murder Tomorrow =

- Trade advertisement from The Daily Film Renter (16 March 1938)
- Directed by: Donovan Pedelty
- Written by: Donovan Pedelty; Frank Harvey (play)
- Produced by: Victor M. Greene
- Starring: Gwenllian Gill; Jack Livesey; Molly Hamley-Clifford
- Cinematography: Ernest Palmer
- Production company: Crusade Films
- Distributed by: Paramount British Pictures
- Release date: 11 February 1938
- Running time: 69 minutes
- Country: United Kingdom
- Language: English

Murder Tomorrow (also known as Murder To-morrow) is a 1938 British crime film directed by Donovan Pedelty and starring Gwenllian Gill, Jack Livesey and Molly Hamley-Clifford. It was written by Pedelty based on the 1937 play of the same title by Frank Harvey, and was made at Cricklewood Studios as a quota quickie for release by Paramount Pictures.

== Preservation status ==
The British Film Institute National Archive holds a collection of ephemera but no film or video materials.

== Plot ==
After he discovers that Jean Andrews has fallen in love with solicitor Peter Winton, her ex-husband McKay tracks her to a boarding house. In a tussle, McKay falls and is accidentally killed. Jean hides the body but Peter discovers it, and she confesses to him. They devise a plan to make it appear that McKay died the following day, by changing the newspapers and tickets in his pockets. They then go away for the weekend, and on their return call the police.

== Cast ==
- Gwenllian Gill as Jean Andrews
- Jack Livesey as Peter Winton
- Molly Hamley-Clifford as Mrs Fitch
- Rani Waller as Miss Canning
- Francis Roberts as Sergeant Enfield
- Raymond Lovell as Inspector Travers
- Jonathan Field as PC Sanders

== Reception ==
The Monthly Film Bulletin wrote: "The film is entertaining because the plot, although simple, is consistently well worked out, and is good cinema, possibly because it is written and directed by the same person definitely as a film. The direction, photography and particularly the characterisation, from the heroine down to the inquisitive tradesman, are all good, and amusing where intended to be so."

Kine Weekly wrote: "Facetious treatment of the macabre, ritzy accents and highfalutin dialogue are very nearly this effort's undoing. The premise of the plot is good, but dramatic effect is more often than not marred by incongruous approach. In fact, if it were not for Molly Hamley-Clitford's ability to maintain character equilibrium the film would have been a flop. Thanks to her it stands a good chance."

The Daily Film Renter wrote: "Plot builds up to suspenseful climax showing harassed heroine's success, while comedy is to fore in scenes where public school policemen come in for good-natured lampooning. Flippant treatment of sombre theme provokes some unintentional laughs, but subject should represent passable quota support."
