= Jenny Laird =

British actress (1912–2001)

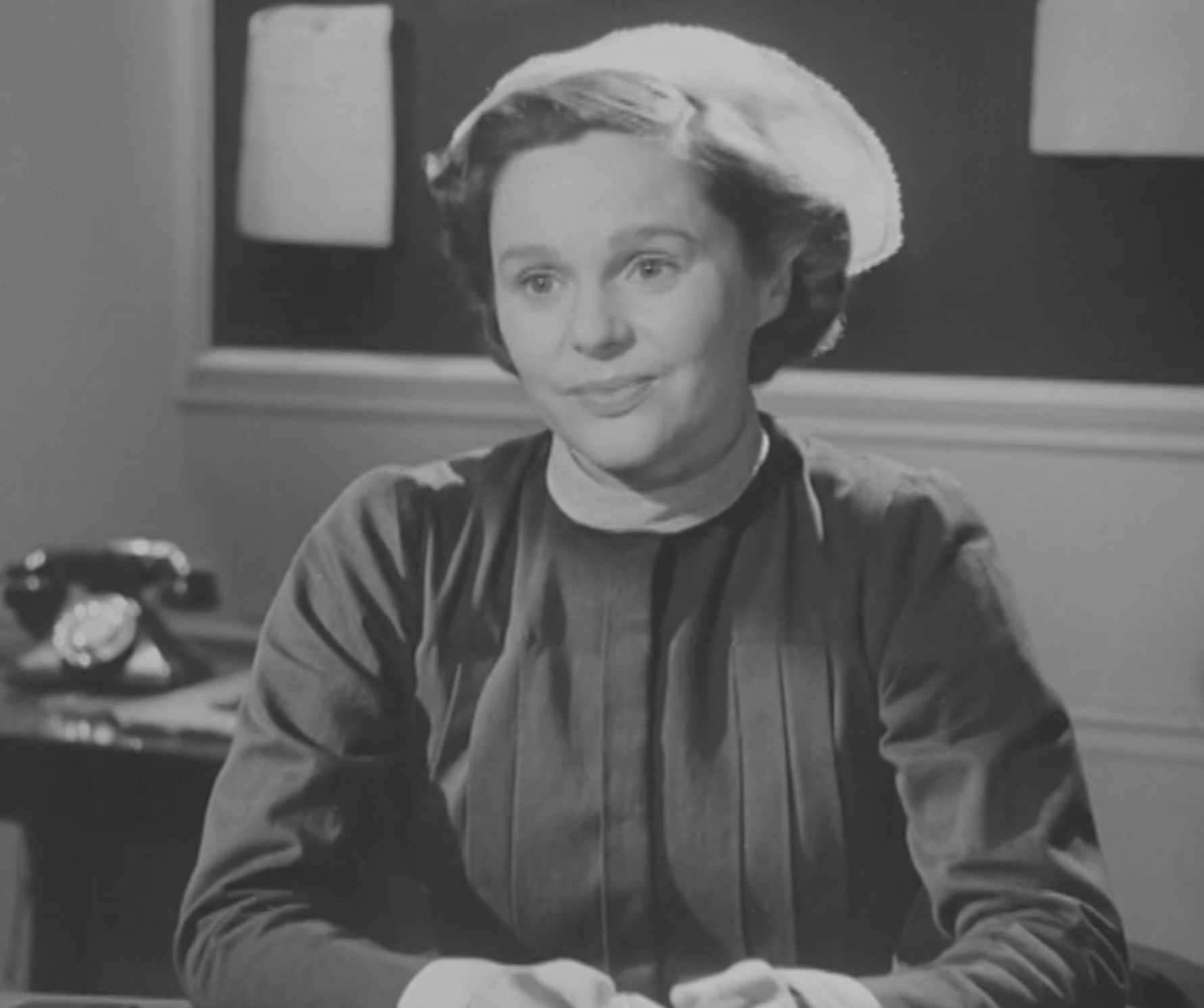
- Jenny Laird (1951) in Life in Her Hands
- Born: Phyllis Edith Mary Blythe; 13 February 1912; Chorlton, Manchester, Lancashire, England
- Died: 31 October 2001 (aged 89); London, England
- Years active: 1935–1991

Phyllis Edith Mary Blythe (13 February 1912 – 31 October 2001), known professionally as Jenny Laird, was a British stage, film and television actress.

== Early life and education ==
Born in Manchester, Laird and her parents moved to the south, and she was educated at Maidstone grammar school and London University. She worked briefly as an advertising copywriter while studying acting with teachers such as the Central School's legendary Elsie Fogerty and in 1937 she made her repertory debut at the Brixton Theatre in A Bill of Divorcement.

== Theatre ==
Laird worked with director Alec Clunes at the Arts Theatre Club during its heyday in the 1940s and 1950s. What the actor-manager sought for the little underground playhouse in London's Great Newport Street was an audience "eager for intelligent and entertaining plays". Laird's acting went from strength to strength in Farquhar, Ibsen, Chekhov, Shaw and other modern plays. While at the Arts Theatre, she periodically returned to "commercial" theatre, playing Rose in The Recruiting Officer (1943) and Nora in A Doll's House (1945). As Ellie, in the revival by Californian John Fernald (whom Laird married in 1947) of Shaw's Heartbreak House (1950), she revealed, one critic wrote, "an enchanting combination of youth and firmness. Her broken heart never ceased to glint through her mask of ice". Her shapely legs and green eyes figured prominently in West End plays by Ivor Novello, N. C. Hunter and Robert Morley.

== Writing ==
With her husband, she co-wrote the West End comedy And No Birds Sing, adapted several plays from the French, and in 1977 wrote Mixed Economy, which played at the King's Head Theatre in Islington, starring Margaret Rawlings and Laird's daughter Karen Fernald.

== Personal life ==
In 1947, Laird married her collaborator John Fernald; they had one daughter, Karen.

== Selected filmography ==
- The Morals of Marcus (1935) - Maid (uncredited)
- Auld Lang Syne (1937) - Alison Begbie
- The Last Chance (1937) - Betty
- Passenger to London (1937) - Barbara Lane
- What a Man! (1938) - Daisy Pennyfeather
- Lily of Laguna (1938) - Jane Marshall
- Black Eyes (1939) - Lucy
- Just William (1940) - Ethel Brown
- The Lamp Still Burns (1943) - Ginger Watkins
- Painted Boats (1945) - Mary Smith
- Beware of Pity (1946) - Trudi
- Wanted for Murder (1946) - Jeannie McLaren
- Black Narcissus (1947) - Sister Honey
- Your Witness (1950) - Mary Baxter, Sam's Wife
- The Long Dark Hall (1951) - Mrs. Sims
- Life in Her Hands (1951) - Matron
- Gilbert Harding Speaking of Murder (1953) - Linda Maxwell
- Face in the Night (1957) - Postman's Widow
- Conspiracy of Hearts (1960) - Sister Honoria
- Village of the Damned (1960) - Mrs. Harrington
- The Masks of Death (1984) - Mrs. Hudson (U.S TV movie)

== Television ==
- The Human Jungle (1963) (1 episode)
- The Forsyte Saga (TV series) (1967)
- The Onedin Line (1972) (3 episodes)
- Doctor Who (1974) (Planet of the Spiders)
- Shoulder to Shoulder (1974) - Matron of Holloway Prison (Lady Constance Lytton)
- Secret Army (TV series) (1974) - Little Old Lady (Else Lambrichts)
- Lillie (1978) (The Jersey Lily)
- All Creatures Great and Small (1988) (Barks and Bites)
- Inspector Morse (1991) (Second Time Around) (final screen role)
