= Shock (1934 film) =

- Directed by: Roy J. Pomeroy
- Screenplay by: Madeleine Ruthven
- Story by: Roy J. Pomeroy
- Starring: Ralph Forbes; Gwenllian Gill; Monroe Owsley
- Cinematography: Jack MacKenzie
- Edited by: Jack Ogilvie
- Production company: Monogram Pictures
- Release date: July 20, 1934 (US)
- Running time: 70 minutes
- Country: United States
- Language: English

Shock is a 1934 American film written by Madeleine Ruthven from a story by Roy J. Pomeroy. It is also directed by Pomeroy and stars Ralph Forbes, Gwenllian Gill and Monroe Owsley.

== Plot ==
While on a pass from his unit, Derek Marbury, a British lieutenant during World War I meets and falls in love with Lucy Neville, a young lady his company's captain, Bob Hayworth, had been romantically interested in. The two hastily marry, and are just beginning their honeymoon, when Marbury's leave is cancelled and all personnel are called back to their regiments, due to an impending German offensive. Once back at the front, his best man and the captain's brother, Gilroy Hayworth, is selected for a dangerous reconnaissance mission. Gilroy is so distraught over the mission he kills himself, rather than face the danger. To prevent a family disgrace, Marbury offers to go on the mission, and making it look like Gilroy was killed in action. Bob agrees with the plan, but on the mission, Marbury is injured by a German shell and knocked unconscious. He awakes in a London hospital, not knowing where or who he is.

Without knowing his real name, the hospital attendant gives him the name of John Drake, and after he recovers he is sent back to the front. Meanwhile, Bob has gone to see Lucy, and tell him that her husband as more than likely deserted, hoping the disgrace will lead Lucy to divorcing Marbury, so that Bob can marry her. Lucy refuses to believe that of the man she married and rebuffs Bob. Marbury is assigned to an aerial unit. Over the next year, he distinguishes himself in combat, as well as becoming friends with Captain Peabody, and Alan Neville, who unbeknownst to them both, is his brother-in-law. On their next leave the three friends intend to go back to England and visit Neville's sister. However, on the next mission Alan is mortally wounded. Before he dies, he makes Marbury/Drake promise to visit his sister, and let her know how he died.

After the war ends, Marbury/Drake, now a major tracks down Lucy, who now has a son, which was conceived during the one day honeymoon with her husband, before he was sent back to the front. While she recognizes him, she does not let on that she knows who he is, and Marbury/Drake agrees to help her search for her missing husband. As the search goes on, he falls in love with Lucy for the second time. Bob is still trying to win over Lucy, and when he tries to discredit Drake, he actually calls him by his real name, Marbury. The utterance triggers Marbury's memory. He falls into a short-term delirium, but when he awakes from the spell, Lucy is waiting for him, and the two are reconciled.

== Cast ==
- Ralph Forbes as Derek Marbury, aka John Drake
- Gwenllian Gill as Lucy Neville Marbury
- Monroe Owsley as Captain Bob Hayworth
- Reginald Sharland as Captain Peabody
- Mary Forbes as Lady Heatherly
- Douglas Walton as Gilroy Hayworth
- Billy Bevan as Meadows
- Clyde Cook as Hawkins
- Alex Courtney as Alan Neville
- David Holt as Rickey Marbury
- Charles Coleman as Colonel
- David Dunbar as Sergeant Matthews
- C. Montague Shaw as Major
- Eric Snowden as Cockney
- Olaf Hytten as Adjutant

== Production ==
In early April 1934 it was announced that Shock would be one of the four films being produced to finish out Monogram's 1934 production schedule. The picture was conceived with an all-English cast, one of six films Monogram was producing that year with a focus on the English market. In mid-May it was announced that the film would begin production before the end of the month. In that same issue of The Film Daily, it was revealed the Roy Pomeroy would be helming the picture, from his original story, with Madeline Ruthvin writing the screenplay, and Ralph Forbes starring. Shortly after, it was announced that Gwenllian Gwill was to be loaned from Paramount Pictures to co-star in the film. Also in mid-March it was revealed that Reginald Sharland would be joining the cast, and the other members of the cast would include Monroe Owsley, Billy Bevan, Clyde Cook, Douglas Walton, Alex Courtney, Olaf Hytten, and C. Montague Shaw. David Holt was added to the cast a week later, with Margaret Seddon joining the cast the following week. By the end of May the film was in production, with filming beginning the week of May 19. By June 9, filming was completed and the movie was in editing. The movie was released on July 20, 1934.

== Reception ==
Photoplay was impressed with the war scenes, but felt that the film was sentimental and predictable. Motion Picture Herald was lukewarm to the film. While they felt there were certain action scenes which showed merit, they felt that the plot offered nothing new. They felt that the British accents of the players might cause some difficulty in American markets. However, Motion Picture Daily gave the picture a good review, calling it "A pleasing and entertaining film...". They felt the film started slowly, but then picked up the pace for the final two-thirds of the picture. They complimented the cinematography as well as the cast, but they did think the direction could have been better. Harrison's Reports also gave the film a good review. While they also felt the plot was old, they gave good marks to Forbes and Gill. They felt the romance in the film was good, and while dated, the plot did hold the suspense. The Film Daily enjoyed the picture, although they felt the major plot point of a wife not recognizing her husband upon his return from war stretched believability. The felt the entire cast gave good performances. And while the felt the cinematography was good, they only rated the direction as fair.
