= Ralph Michael =

English actor (1907–1994)

- Michael in Murder Most Foul (1964)
- Born: Ralph Champion Shotter; 26 September 1907; Edmonton, London, England
- Died: 9 November 1994 (aged 87); Brighton, Sussex, England
- Occupation: Actor
- Years active: 1931–1994
- Spouses: Fay Compton (m. 1942; div. 1946) Joyce Heron (m. 1947; died 1980)

Ralph Michael (26 September 1907 – 9 November 1994) was an English actor. He was born as Ralph Champion Shotter in London. A prolific film, theatre and television actor, he is perhaps best known for the movies he made at Ealing Studios during the 1940s, such as San Demetrio London (1943), For Those in Peril (1944) and Dead of Night (1945).

== Career ==
He began his acting career at The Old Vic Theatre in the 1931-1932 season, playing among others Horatio in Hamlet. His film career began in the late 1930s with False Evidence (1937), before becoming a contract actor at Ealing Studios. There he had uncredited supporting roles in The Bells Go Down (1943) and They Came to a City (1944), then moved up the cast list with major roles in San Demetrio London (1943), For Those in Peril (1944), Johnny Frenchman (1945), The Captive Heart (1946) and most memorably in the 'Haunted Mirror' section of the anthology film Dead of Night (1945). He was the star of A Song for Tomorrow (1948) and Penny and the Pownall Case (1948) before settling down to being a supporting actor in films such as The Hasty Heart (1949), The Astonished Heart, The Sound Barrier (1952), A Night to Remember (1958), The Heroes of Telemark (1965), Khartoum (1966) and Empire of the Sun (1987).

Television credits include: The Adventures of Robin Hood, A Tale of Two Cities, Dixon of Dock Green, Danger Man, Kessler, The Forsyte Saga, Man in a Suitcase, The Avengers, Colditz, Doctor at Large, Gazette, Public Eye, Sutherland's Law, Softly, Softly, The Professionals, Rumpole of the Bailey, A Tale of Two Cities, Prince Regent, Doctor Who, Bergerac, Miss Marple, Dempsey and Makepeace, Rockliffe's Babies, Howards' Way, A Bit of Fry & Laurie, Jeeves and Wooster and The Camomile Lawn.

== Personal life ==
He was married twice. He was the fourth and last husband of actress Fay Compton (they divorced in 1946 after he had an affair with the actress Patricia Roc), and he was later married to actress Joyce Heron, from 1947 until her death in 1980.

== Partial filmography ==
- False Evidence (1937) – Police Constable Barlow
- John Halifax (1938) – Phineas Fletcher
- The Girl Who Forgot (1940) – Tony Stevenage
- Front Line Kids (1942) – Paul
- Gert and Daisy Clean Up (1942) – Jack Gregory
- Women Aren't Angels (1943) – Jack
- The Bells Go Down (1943) – Dunkirk Survivor (uncredited)
- San Demetrio London (1943) – 2nd. Officer Hawkins
- For Those in Peril (1944) – P / O Rawlings
- They Came to a City (1944) – Sergeant Jimmy (uncredited)
- Dead of Night (1945) – Peter Cortland
- Johnny Frenchman (1945) – Bob Tremayne
- The Captive Heart (1946) – Capt. Thurston R.A.M.C.
- A Song for Tomorrow (1948) – Roger Stanton
- Penny and the Pownall Case (1948) – Det. Insp. Michael Carson
- The Hasty Heart (1949) – Kiwi
- The Astonished Heart (1950) – Philip Lucas
- The Sound Barrier (1952) – Fletcher
- Women Without Men (A.K.A. Blonde Bait) - (1956) – Julian Lord
- Seven Waves Away (1957) – George Kilgore
- The Birthday Present (1957) – Crowther (uncredited)
- The Supreme Secret (1958) – Sgt. Milligan
- A Night to Remember (1958) – Jay Yates
- Date at Midnight (1959) – Sir Edward Leyton
- A Taste of Money (1960) – Supt. White
- The World of Tim Frazer (1960-61, TV series) – Charles Ross
- The Court Martial of Major Keller (1961) – Colonel Winch
- The Valiant (1962) – Commander Clark
- Private Potter (1962) – Padre
- Children of the Damned (1964) – Defense Minister
- Murder Most Foul (1964) – Ralph Summers
- A Jolly Bad Fellow (1964) – Superintendent Rastleigh
- He Who Rides a Tiger (1965) – Carter
- The Heroes of Telemark (1965) – Nilssen
- Khartoum (1966) – Sir Charles Dilke
- Grand Prix (1966) – Mr. Stoddard
- House of Cards (1968) – Claude de Gonde
- The Assassination Bureau (1969) – Editor (uncredited)
- The Magic Christian (1969) - Man at bar (uncredited)
- The Count of Monte Cristo (1975) – M. Dantes
- Dagboek van een Oude Dwaas (1987) – Marcel Hamelinck
- Lionheart (1987) – William Nerra
- Empire of the Sun (1987) – Mr Partridge
