= John Batten (actor) =

New Zealand actor (1903–1993)

- Born: 3 April 1903; Wellington, New Zealand
- Died: 10 August 1993 (aged 90); Colchester, England
- Relatives: Jean Batten (sister)

John Batten (3 April 1903 – 10 August 1993) was a New Zealand actor who appeared in a number of British and American films from the 1920s to 1930s. He was the brother of the well-known aviator Jean Batten.

== Early life ==
Born in Wellington, New Zealand, on 3 April 1903, John Batten was the second son of a dentist and his wife. His childhood was spent in Rotorua, to where the Batten family had moved the year after his birth. His mother, Ellen, was prominent in the local theatre scene there. In 1913, the Batten family moved to Auckland. By this time, it included a younger sister for John, Jean Batten, who was born in 1909. He attended King's College for a time although he was subsequently educated at state schools when money became scarce. In 1920, he went to London and studied at the Royal Academy of Dramatic Arts and the following year went to Australia. After working for the Royal Comic Opera Company he made his way to California in the United States.

== Film career ==
The poster for the 1929 film Under the Greenwood Tree, in which Batten had a leading role

After being cast in a Booth Tarkington play in Los Angeles, Batten began to appear in films. An early role was as an extra in a Cecil B. DeMille movie. He subsequently acted in The Battle of the Sexes in 1928 for D. W. Griffith and in The Last of Mrs Cheyney, alongside Norma Shearer. After encountering visa problems, he went to the United Kingdom. There he played the lead role in 1929's Under the Greenwood Tree, a British International Pictures production. In 1930 he appeared in another lead role, in The Love Waltz. In 1932, he appeared in the Walter Summers film Men Like These, portraying one of the crew of a stricken submarine.

When his sister Jean Batten moved to London in 1931, she lived with John Batten as she established her fledgling aviation career but the two subsequently quarreled. She went onto make notable record-breaking flights—including the record solo flight for a woman from England to Australia and the first solo flight from England to New Zealand—but the siblings never spoke again. In the meantime, acting work became scarce for Batten and by 1935 he had a job working as a receptionist for a plastic surgeon. By this time he was married, to Madeline Murat, a successful writer, and had a daughter. Due to a lack of acting opportunities, in 1936 he moved his family to Tahiti, where his wife continued to write.

By 1940 he had divorced Madeline and was back in New Zealand. He joined the Royal New Zealand Navy, serving aboard the cruisers HMNZS Achilles and HMNZS Gambia during the Second World War. In 1943, he was granted special leave to go to London for six months, acting at Ealing Studios in For Those In Peril, a film about the British Air-Sea Rescue Service.

== Later life ==
After the war he lived in New Zealand for a time and appeared in Rudall Hayward's Song of the Wanganui, a short film released in 1961. He played the role of a naval officer holidaying along the Whanganui River. At some time in the 1960s, he moved back to the United Kingdom and settled in Colchester. He died there on 10 August 1993. His obituary in The Press described him as New Zealand's "first international movie star".
