= Oliver Wakefield =

British comedian (1909–1956)

- Born: 29 May 1909; Mahlabathini, Colony of Natal, South Africa
- Died: 30 June 1956 (aged 47); Rye, New York, U.S.
- Occupation(s): Actor, comedian

Oliver Wakefield (29 May 1909 – 30 June 1956) was a popular British actor and comedian, born in South Africa, who was active from the 1930s until his death in 1956. Often billed as "The Voice of Inexperience", Wakefield is best known for his idiosyncratic satirical monologues.

== Biography ==
Born in Mahlabathini, Natal, Wakefield was educated in South Africa, then traveled to England, where he began acting with a Shakespearean repertory company. He then attended the Royal Academy of Dramatic Arts for further study, where he developed his distinctive style of humorous monologue. Wakefield created the stage persona of a nervous upper class young man, customarily dressed in full dinner suit and habitually carrying a cigarette. He developed a distinctive stuttering mode of speech featuring tortuous syntax, malapropisms, spoonerisms, dropped words and unfinished sentences which he used to disguise his satirical observations, wry sarcasm and clever double entendres. In his early career he was clean-shaven but later grew a handlebar moustache.

He quickly established himself in nightclubs and music hall and became the first Resident Comedian on the BBC, as well as making pioneering appearances in the early days of British TV, despite sometimes contravening the BBC's strict rules on vulgarity. He also became established in the United States and appeared in the variety movie short On the Air and Off (1933) (USA short, filmed at Biograph Studios, Bronx, New York City) (Universal Pictures). He made one of his first American stage appearances in the Ziegfeld Follies of 1934, which also featured Eve Arden. He was sometimes billed in the U.S. as Lord Oliver Wakefield, and later said: "For some considerable time, millions of people thought I was a peer of the realm and I was afforded many privileges...".

Wakefield appeared in several British Pathé newsreels in the late 1930s. In 1937 he starred in the 20th Century Fox film There Was Young Man, followed by featured roles in several British films between 1938 and 1942 including The Peterville Diamond (1942), playing a gentleman jewel thief (whose partner-in-crime was played by future Doctor Who star William Hartnell). He made regular appearances at the Savoy Theatre, the Berkeley, the Ritz, Cafe de Paris, Churchill's and other leading London venues. He was booked to open at the Rainbow Room in New York City three weeks after the outbreak of World War II, but chose to remain in England, where he served in the R.A.F.

After the war, Wakefield returned to show business. He toured Australia, performing for a year in Melbourne and Sydney, followed by a 52-week radio series for the Australian Broadcasting Commission. Moving to the United States in 1952, he performed at the Blue Angel in New York, followed by engagements at Number One Fifth Avenue, Ruban Bleu and Bon Soir and TV appearances on All Star Revue, the Kate Smith show, The Steve Allen Show and many others. His last Broadway appearance was in the Broadway revue, Two's Company at the Alvin Theatre in New York in 1952, which starred Bette Davis. In Canada he appeared frequently on the Canadian Broadcasting Service on the Frigidair TV Show, played a fourteen-week engagement at Montreal club Ruby Foos and hosted his own TV panel Show Make a Match.

Wakefield died from a heart attack at his Rye, New York home at 351 Park Avenue, aged 47.

== Selected filmography ==
- There Was a Young Man (1937)
- Shipyard Sally (1939)
- George and Margaret (1940)
- The Peterville Diamond (1942)
- Let the People Sing (1942)
