= Eblana Theatre =

Dublin theatre (1959 to 1995)

Coordinates: 53°20′59″N 6°15′8″W

- Interactive map of Eblana Theatre
- Address: Busáras, Store Street; Dublin 1 Ireland

Construction
- Opened: 17 September 1959
- Years active: 1959–1995
- Architect: Michael Scott

The Eblana Theatre in Ireland was situated in the basement of Busáras, Dublin's central bus station. A small theatre seating 225–240 people, it had no wings, nor other common items of theatrical architecture having been adapted from a short-lived newsreel cinema. It operated from 17 September 1959 until 1995.

== Establishment ==
The space that became the Eblana Theatre was planned as a small newsreel cinema to entertain waiting bus passengers, and so it operated for about two years. In 1958 the lease was acquired by actress Phyllis Ryan. She and associates (including actor Des Nealon) ran the venue as a conventional theatre and home to her company, Gemini Productions. It opened in 1959 during the Dublin Theatre Festival.

The presence of the theatre fulfilled a plan to use Busáras as a multifunction public building. Its early cinematic purpose meant the theatre had no wings, which made complex sets and mounting large plays impossible.

The Eblana's modest scale and its proximity to the bus station toilets were a source of derision and a joke that it was "The only public toilet in Dublin with its own theatre". Performances were sometimes interrupted by lost passengers seeking the amenities.

== Associations ==
During the 1960s and 1970s, Phyllis Ryan was the major producer of new plays in Ireland outside of the Abbey Theatre. She and her company kept independent theatre alive in Dublin and premiered most of the work of playwright John B. Keane. Writers that Gemini Productions nurtured such as Brian Friel, Joe O'Donnell, Hugh Leonard, and Tom Murphy were later adopted by the Abbey and other theatres but owed their first productions to Ryan's vision and courage.

== Closure ==
Gemini Productions moved out of the venue in the mid-1980s and it was run for a short time during the mid-1990s by Andrews Lane Theatre. It was then leased by Northside Theatre Company, and closed in 1995.

The theatre is mostly intact in spite of claims to the contrary, including that it became a left luggage facility. Posters and programmes remain from its last performance.

In 2012, plans to refurbish the theatre to house the Fry Model Railway were announced at an estimated cost of one million euros. This plan did not proceed and, as of 2024, the theatre was still closed, with Bus Éireann working on plans to convert the space to a staff training centre.

== See also ==
- Eblana (an ancient Irish settlement, traditionally associated with the site of modern Dublin)
