= Behind Your Back =

1937 British film by Donovan Pedelty

- Press pack
- Directed by: Donovan Pedelty
- Written by: Donovan Pedelty
- Based on: play by Charles Landstone
- Produced by: Victor M. Greene
- Starring: Jack Livesey; Dinah Sheridan; Betty Astell
- Cinematography: Stanley Grant
- Production company: Crusade Films
- Distributed by: Paramount British Pictures
- Release date: April 1937
- Running time: 70 minutes
- Country: United Kingdom
- Language: English

Behind Your Back is a 1937 British drama film directed by Donovan Pedelty and starring Jack Livesey, Dinah Sheridan and Betty Astell. It was written by Pedelty based on the play by Charles Landstone, and made at Wembley Studios as a quota quickie.

== Preservation status ==
The British Film Institute National Archive holds a collection of ephemera and stills but no film or video materials.

== Plot ==
Theatre manager Archie Bentley is in love with stage manageress Gwen Bingham, but when he discovers that she has a past, they fight. The doorman, Leslie Woodofrd, is in love with the cashier, Kitty Hogan, and his wife catches him in Kitty's arms. Lady Millicent Coombs, a dramatist, arrives on the scene and settles all the difficulties.

== Cast ==
- Jack Livesey as Archie Bentley
- Dinah Sheridan as Kitty Hogan
- Betty Astell as Gwen Bingham
- Stella Bonheur as Lady Millicent Coombe
- Desmond Marshall as Leslie Woodford
- Rani Waller as Mary Woodford
- Kenneth Buckley as Albert Clifford
- Toni Edgar-Bruce as Clara Bradley
- Raymond Lovell as Adam Adams
- Jimmy Mageean as man from the stalls
- Molly Hamley-Clifford as Mrs Cowell
- Jonathan Field as Vivian Hooker
- Dorothy Dewhurst as Hon. Mrs. Vealfield

== Reception ==
The Monthly Film Bulletin wrote: "Most of the action takes place in the dress-circle bar and this, together with the limited use made of the camera, gives the film a 'stagey' atmosphere. The dialogue, however, is sufficiently clever to sustain interest, and the cast displays excellent team work. Jack Livesey, in particular, as Archie, maintains his usually high standard of acting."

Kine Weekly wrote: "The treatment is novel and the dialogue is good, and so is much of the character drawing, but bright as the talk is there is a little too much of it, and that is the snag. Although more intelligent than the average quota offering, the film lacks many of the popular essentials. In brief, it is not entirely kinematic. ... The story has no dramatic point; its mission is to illustrate the ups and downs of theatrical life from the inside. Its intimacy is intriguing, and the many diverse characters intertwine effectively and pattern into unusual entertainment, but the momentum is strictly regulated to dialogue."

Picture Show wrote: "This rather dull theatrical drama takes place in the dress circle bar during the performance of a not-too-successful play. It deals with the trials and tribulations of the various people concerned with its production. Its stage origin is clearly seen, and there is practically no action whatever."
