= Gwenllian Gill =

British actress (1915–2004)

- Born: 11 December 1915; Hartlepool, County Durham, England
- Died: 24 January 2004 (aged 88); Eureka Springs, Arkansas, United States
- Occupation: Actress
- Years active: 1934–1960 (film)

Gwenllian Gill (11 December 1915 – 24 January 2004) was a British film actress. After originally appearing in some films in Hollywood she returned to Britain to appear in leading roles in several quota quickies.

== Selected filmography ==
- Shock (1934)
- Behold My Wife! (1934)
- Come On Marines! (1934)
- Menace (1934)
- Father Brown, Detective (1934)
- White Lilac (1935)
- Flame in the Heather (1935)
- Irish and Proud of It (1936)
- King of Hearts (1936)
- False Evidence (1937)
- Murder Tomorrow (1938)
- Midnight Lace (1960)

== Bibliography ==
- Goble, Alan. The Complete Index to Literary Sources in Film. Walter de Gruyter, 1999.
