= Lockwood West =

British actor (1905–1989)

- Born: Harry Lockwood West; 28 July 1905; Birkenhead, Cheshire, England
- Died: 28 March 1989 (aged 83); Brighton, East Sussex, England
- Resting place: Downs Crematorium, Brighton
- Spouse: Olive Carleton-Crowe (m. 1927; died 1985)
- Children: 2, including Timothy West
- Relatives: Samuel West (grandson)

Harry Lockwood West (28 July 1905 – 28 March 1989) was a British actor. He was the father of actor Timothy West and the grandfather of actor Samuel West.

== Life and career ==
West was born in Birkenhead, Cheshire, England in 1905, the son of Mildred (née Hartley) and Henry Cope West and through his mother a fourth cousin of the actress Margaret Lockwood, their common ancestor being Joseph Lockwood (c.1758–1837), a former Mayor of Doncaster, West Riding of Yorkshire. West married the actress Olive Carleton-Crowe and with her had two children; a son, the actor Timothy West and a daughter. Carleton-Crowe died in 1985.

He made his stage debut in 1926 as Lieutenant Allen in Alf's Button at the Hippodrome Theatre in Margate, Kent. His London stage debut was as Henry Bevan in The Barretts of Wimpole Street at the Queen's Theatre in 1931.

West's television appearances include Just William (1962), Dr. Finlay's Casebook (1964), No Hiding Place (1965), The Prisoner (1967), Doctor at Large (1971), Please Sir! (1972), The Shadow of the Tower (1972), The Pallisers (1974), I, Claudius (1976), Porterhouse Blue (1987) and posthumously in Specials (1991). He portrayed King Edward VII in 1972 in an episode of the LWT television drama series Upstairs, Downstairs entitled "Guest of Honour", in which the King visited the family for dinner, and also in the BBC television drama series The Life and Times of David Lloyd George in 1981. His son Timothy West was to also play the King in the 1975 television series Edward the Seventh.

His film appearances include A Song for Tomorrow (1948), Bedazzled (1967), Up the Junction (1968), Jane Eyre (1970), The Satanic Rites of Dracula (1973), Young Sherlock Holmes (1985) and as Geoffrey in The Dresser (1983) .

On BBC Radio West appeared in numerous drama productions from the 1940s to the 1980s. He played ' Marlow ' an office manager in ' A Life of Bliss ' , to George Cole (actor)'s David Bliss, in 1969. Between 1969 and 1980 played the role of Arthur Tyson in the BBC Radio 2 daily serial Waggoners' Walk.

He died of cancer on 28 March 1989, in Brighton.

== Selected filmography ==
- A Song for Tomorrow (1948) – Mr. Stokes
- Badger's Green (1949) – Managing director
- Edward, My Son (1949) – Hall porter (uncredited)
- Celia (1949) – Dr. Cresswell
- No Place for Jennifer (1950) – Head Salesman at Jeweller's Shop
- Last Holiday (1950) – Dinsdale
- High Treason (1951) – Minister (uncredited)
- Hammer the Toff (1952) – Kennedy
- The Oracle (1953) – Adams
- Sailor of the King (1953) – Lt. Marsh (uncredited)
- Seagulls Over Sorrento (1954) – Curly, Stores Petty Officer (uncredited)
- Lease of Life (1954) – The Bookdealer
- Private's Progress (1956) – Detective (uncredited)
- The Birthday Present (1957) – Mr. Barraclough
- The Mark of the Hawk (1957) – Magistrate
- The Man Who Could Cheat Death (1959) – First Doctor (uncredited)
- Tunes of Glory (1960) – Provost
- Strongroom (1962) – Police Inspector
- The Running Man (1963) – Bank Manager
- The Leather Boys (1964) – Reggie's Father
- Game for Three Losers (1965) – Justice Tree
- Rotten to the Core (1965) – Bank Manager (uncredited)
- Life at the Top (1965) – Man at 1st meeting (uncredited)
- Bedazzled (1967) – St. Peter
- Up the Junction (1968) – Magistrate
- A Dandy in Aspic (1968) – Quince
- Jane Eyre (1970) – Reverend Wood
- One Brief Summer (1970) – Ebert
- The Satanic Rites of Dracula (1973) – Freeborne
- The Dresser (1983) – Geoffrey Thornton
- The Shooting Party (1985) – Rogers
- Young Sherlock Holmes (1985) – Curio Shop Owner
