= There Was a Young Man =

- Nancy O'Neil, Oliver Wakefield and John Laurie in the film
- Directed by: Albert Parker
- Written by: Dudley Clark; David Evans
- Produced by: Albert Parker
- Starring: Oliver Wakefield; Nancy O'Neil; Clifford Heatherley
- Cinematography: Stanley Grant
- Production company: Twentieth Century Fox
- Distributed by: Twentieth Century Fox
- Release date: 28 September 1937
- Running time: 63 minutes
- Country: United Kingdom
- Language: English

There Was a Young Man is a 1937 British comedy film directed by Albert Parker and starring Oliver Wakefield, Nancy O'Neil and Clifford Heatherley. It was written by Dudley Clark and David Evans, and made at Wembley Studios as a quota quickie by Twentieth Century Fox.

== Plot ==
George Peabody is an unsuccessful inventor. When his wealthy uncle passes away, George and his fiancée Barbara anticipate a large inheritance, but they are disappointed to find George has been left only £200. Despite this, the residents of his seaside town, believing him to be a millionaire, treat him like a celebrity. All is well until a pair of crooks appoint George as the head of a fraudulent land development scheme, leaving him in a financial mess. However, his luck turns when a relic left him by his uncle is revealed to be valuable sacred object, fetching him £5,000. His windfall puts an end to his troubles.

== Cast ==
- Oliver Wakefield as George Peabody
- Nancy O'Neil as Barbara Blake
- Clifford Heatherley as Wallop
- Robert Nainby as vicar
- Molly Hamley-Clifford as Mrs. Blake
- Eric Hales as Vernon
- Brian Buchel as Prince Bunkhadin
- John Laurie as stranger
- Syd Crossley as Slim

== Reception ==
The Daily Film Renter wrote: "Serviceable plot overwhelmed in gabble, with players not appearing to take subject seriously. Exaggerated humour, plethora of situations and noisy crowd scenes in unconvincing subject. Poor stuff for most indulgent patrons."

Kine Weekly wrote: "The comedy values of the story are considerable but hasty production and stagey acting spoil many of the situations."

Picturegoer wrote: "Apart from Oliver Wakefield's portrayal of a shy, small-town investor ... there is little to recommend this picture. The idea is there, but it has not been well developed nor is it helped by certain crudities both in characterisation and acting. Oliver Wakefield exploits his stutter and clipped speech to the full."

Picture Show wrote: "Rather dull comedy ... It is fairly well acted, but is never convincing and is seldom very funny."
