= Jack Livesey =

British actor (1901–1961)

- In Penny Paradise (1938)
- Born: Jack Edwards Livesey; 11 June 1901; Barry, Vale of Glamorgan, Wales
- Died: 12 October 1961 (aged 60); Burbank, California, U.S.
- Occupation: Film actor
- Years active: 1918–1961
- Parent(s): Sam Livesey; Margaret Ann Edwards

Jack Edwards Livesey (11 June 1901 – 12 October 1961) was a British film actor.

He was born in Barry, Vale of Glamorgan, the son of Sam Livesey, the brother of Barry Livesey, and the cousin and step-brother of Roger Livesey. He died in Burbank, California, aged 60.

On stage he appeared in the hit West End musical The Lisbon Story from 1943 to 1944.

In 1960, he portrayed Gillespie MacKenzie in an episode of the Western series Maverick titled "Cruise of the Cynthia B" starring James Garner and Mona Freeman. Garner's character (Bret Maverick) finds him hanging from a tree in the opening scene, cuts him down, and subsequently regrets it.

== Partial filmography ==
- The Divine Gift (1918)
- La mille et deuxième nuit (1933) - Prince Tahar (English version, voice)
- The Wandering Jew (1933) - Godfrey, Duke of Normandy
- Song of the Plough (1933) - Squire's Son
- The Warren Case (1934) - Husband In Nightclub (uncredited)
- The Passing of the Third Floor Back (1935) - Mr. Larkcom
- Variety (1935) - Matt Boyd
- The Howard Case (1936) - Jerry
- Rembrandt (1936) - Journeyman
- It's Never Too Late to Mend (1937) - Tom Robinson
- Behind Your Back (1937) - Archie Bentley
- First Night (1937) - Richard Garnet
- Murder Tomorrow (1938) - Peter Wilton
- Penny Paradise (1938) - Bert
- Old Bones of the River (1938) - Captain Hamilton
- Bedtime Story (1938) - Sir John Shale
- The World Owes Me a Living (1945) - Jack Graves
- The First Gentleman (1948) - Edward
- Murder at the Windmill (1949) - Vivian Van Damm
- Paul Temple's Triumph (1950) - Sir Graham Forbes
- Patterns of Power (1956) - Mr. Vandeventer
- Midnight Lace (1960) - Policeman (uncredited)
- Alfred Hitchcock Presents (1960) (Season 5 Episode 29: "The Hero") - Ship's Captain
- Alfred Hitchcock Presents (1961) (Season 6 Episode 17: "The Last Escape") - Psychiatrist
- Alfred Hitchcock Presents (1962) (Season 7 Episode 13: "The Silk Petticoat") - Dr. Minden (final role in Alfred Hitchcock Presents, posthumous release)
- That Touch of Mink (1962) - Doctor Richardson (posthumous release)
- The Notorious Landlady (1962) - Counsel (uncredited, posthumous release, final film role)
