= Francis de Wolff =

English actor (1913–1984)

- Francis de Wolff in The Smallest Show on Earth, 1957
- Born: Francis-Marie Arist de Wolff; 7 January 1913; Essex, England
- Died: 18 April 1984 (aged 71); Sussex, England
- Occupation: Actor
- Years active: 1935–1977
- Spouse(s): Jean Fairlie (m. 1942; div. 1950) Melissa Dundas (m. 1958; div. 1971) Linda Finch (m. 1976)
- Children: 4

Baron Francis-Marie Arist de Wolff (7 January 1913 – 18 April 1984) was an English character actor. Large, bearded, and beetle-browed, he was often cast as villains and foreigners in both film and television.

== Early life ==
De Wolff was born in Essex in January 1913. He was the son of Baron Vladimir de Wolff, a Russian-born nobleman, and Baroness Gwendolin May de Wolff. He grew up on the family’s estate in Lewes, and studied acting at the Royal Academy of Dramatic Arts.

== Career ==
De Wolff made his film debut in Flame in the Heather (1935), and made many other appearances in such films as Fire Over England (1937), Treasure Island (1950), Scrooge (1951), as the Ghost of Christmas Present, Ivanhoe (1952), Moby Dick (1956), Saint Joan (1957), From Russia with Love (1963), and Carry On Cleo (1964).

He is perhaps best remembered, however, as a supporting player in horror movies of the 1950s and 1960s, many of them for Hammer Films. These include Corridors of Blood (1958), The Hound of the Baskervilles (1959), The Man Who Could Cheat Death (1959), The Two Faces of Dr. Jekyll (1960), Devil Doll (1964), and The Black Torment (1964). His last film appearance was in The Three Musketeers (1973).

His television appearances included The Avengers, Maigret, Richard the Lionheart, Danger Man, Doctor Who (twice, once playing Agamemnon), The Ordeal of Richard Feverel, The Saint, Rookery Nook, Paul Temple, Dixon of Dock Green, The Tomorrow People, and the miniseries Jesus of Nazareth.

== Personal life ==
De Wolff was married three times, and had four children.

=== Death ===
He died in Sussex at the age of 71, on April 18, 1984.

== Filmography ==
- Ten Minute Alibi (1935)
- Flame in the Heather (1935) as Hawley
- Line Engaged (1935) (uncredited)
- Fire Over England (1937) as Sir James Tarleton
- It's Hard to Be Good (1948) as Fighting Neighbour (uncredited)
- Cardboard Cavalier (1949) as Soldier
- Adam and Evelyne (1949) as 2nd Man at Restaurant Bar (uncredited)
- Trottie True (1949) as George Edwards (uncredited)
- Under Capricorn (1949) as Major Wilkins
- Treasure Island (1950) as Black Dog
- The Naked Heart (1950) as Papa Suprenant
- She Shall Have Murder (1950) as Police Inspector
- The Powder Monkey (1951 TV movie) as Ben
- Flesh and Blood (1951) as Ambassador (uncredited)
- Scrooge (1951) as Spirit of Christmas Present
- Tom Brown's Schooldays (1951) as Squire Brown
- Ivanhoe (1952) as Front De Boeuf
- Miss Robin Hood (1952) as Accident Policeman
- Moulin Rouge (1952) as Victor (uncredited)
- The Master of Ballantrae (1953) as Matthew Bull
- The Kidnappers (1953) as Jan Hooft Sr.
- The Diamond (1954) as Yeo
- The Man Upstairs (1954 TV movie) as Cyrus Armstrong
- The Seekers (1954) as Capt. Bryce
- Geordie (1955) as Samson
- King's Rhapsody (1955) as The Prime Minister
- Here's Archie (1956 TV movie) as Tutor
- Moby Dick (1956) as Captain Gardiner
- Odongo (1956) as George Watford
- The Smallest Show on Earth (1957) as Albert Hardcastle
- Saint Joan (1957) as La Tremouille
- Sea Fury (1958) as Mulder
- The Roots of Heaven (1958) as Father Farque
- Corridors of Blood (1958) as Black Ben
- The Hound of the Baskervilles (1959) as Doctor Richard Mortimer
- The Man Who Could Cheat Death (1959) as Inspector Legris
- Tommy the Toreador (1959) as Hotel Proprietor
- The Savage Innocents (1960) as Trading Post Proprietor
- The Two Faces of Dr. Jekyll (1960) as Inspector
- Clue of the Twisted Candle (1960) as Ramon Karadis
- The Curse of the Werewolf (1961) as Bearded Customer (uncredited)
- The Silent Invasion (1962) as Emile
- The Durant Affair (1962) as Mario Costello
- Siege of the Saxons (1963) as The Blacksmith
- From Russia with Love (1963) as Vavra
- The World Ten Times Over (1963) as Shelbourne
- The Three Lives of Thomasina (1963) as Targu
- Devil Doll (1964) as Dr. Keisling
- The Black Torment (1964) as Black John
- Carry On Cleo (1964) as Agrippa
- Licensed to Kill (1965) as Walter Pickering
- The Liquidator (1965) as Ambassador Dragov (uncredited)
- Triple Cross (1966) as German Colonel General
- Ghosts – Italian Style (1968) as The Scotsman
- The Fixer (1968) as Warden
- Sinful Davey (1969) as Andrew
- Rookery Nook (1970 TV movie) as Mr. Putz
- The Canterbury Tales (1972) as The Bride's Father (uncredited)
- The Three Musketeers (1973) as Sea Captain
