= Richard Hayward (actor) =

Irish actor (1892–1964)

- Born: 24 October 1892; Southport, Lancashire, England
- Died: 13 October 1964 (aged 71); Ballymena, Northern Ireland
- Occupations: Film actor, writer and musician

Richard Hayward (24 October 1892 – 13 October 1964) was a British film actor, writer and musician.

== Life and career ==
Born in Southport, Lancashire, his family moved to Northern Ireland when he was a baby. Hayward was an enthusiast for all Ulster regional popular culture. He was a member of the Orange Order, to which he dedicated much time. After a period working at the Gaiety Theatre, Dublin he helped form the Belfast Repertory Theatre Company. He was a popular singer in the forties and fifties. His career meant he lived a typical theatrical lifestyle being constantly on the move.

Hayward wrote a number of travel books about Ireland, exploring every county. He was closely associated with the Belfast Naturalists' Field Club, serving as its president in 1951.

== Death ==
He died after a road accident outside Ballymena, in October 1964.

== Selected filmography ==
- Flame in the Heather (1935) – Fassiefern
- The Voice of Ireland (1936)
- The Early Bird (1936) – Daniel Duff
- The Luck of the Irish (1936) – Sam Mulhern
- Shipmates o' Mine (1936) – Mike Dooley
- Devil's Rock (1938) – Sam Mulhern
- Irish and Proud of It (1938) – Donogh O'Connor
- A Night to Remember (1958) – Victualling Officer (final film role)

Hayward also wrote the screenplay of the musical drama Devil's Rock.

== Selected books ==
He wrote a number of books, mostly topographical, about Ireland, including:

- In praise of Ulster (Arthur Barker, 1938)
- Where the Shannon flows (1940)
- Corrib Country (Dundalgan Press, 1943)
- In the Kingdom of Kerry (Dundalgan Press, 1946)
- Leinster and the city of Dublin (Arthur Barker, 1949)
- Ulster and the City of Belfast (Arthur Barker, 1950)
- Belfast through the ages (Dundalgan Press, 1952)
- Connacht and the city of Galway (Arthur Barker, 1952)
- Story of the Irish Harp (Arthur Guinness, Son & Co., 1954)
- Mayo, Sligo, Leitrim & Roscommon (Arthur Barker, 1955)
- Munster and the city of Cork (Phoenix House, 1964)
