= Harold Dearden =

British psychiatrist and screenwriter (1882–1962)

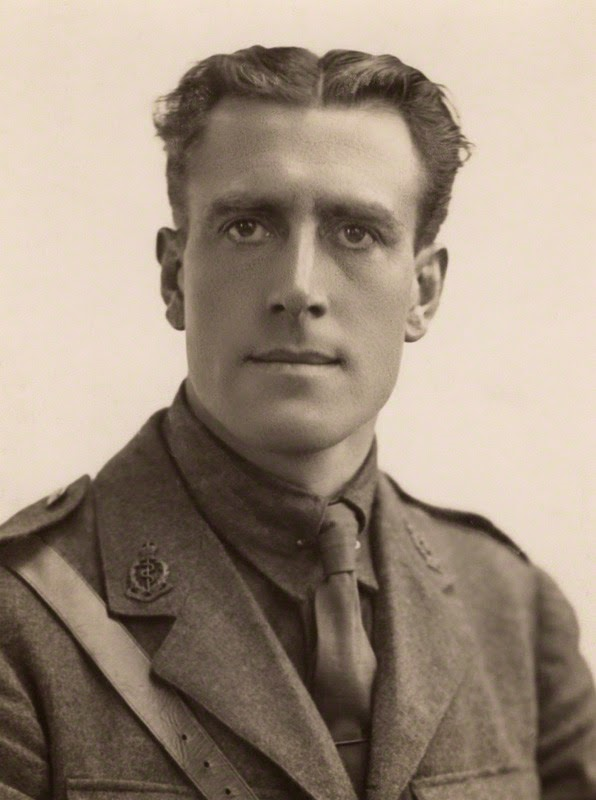
- Born: 13 December 1882; Bolton
- Died: 6 July 1962 (aged 79); Hay-on-Wye
- Occupations: Psychiatrist, screenwriter

Harold Dearden (13 December 1882 – 6 July 1962) was a British psychiatrist and screenwriter.

== Biography ==
Dearden was born in Bolton, Lancashire. He was educated at Gonville and Caius College, Cambridge and London Hospital. He qualified as a physician in 1911.

During World War I, he joined the Royal Army Medical Corps. He was a medical officer for the 3rd Battalion of the Grenadier Guards. In 1916, he became honorary Captain. At the Battle of the Somme he was wounded, suffering from a lost eye and shell shock. He was later invalided out of the war.

During World War II, Dearden worked as a psychiatrist and was principal interrogator at Camp 020.

He wrote the play Interference (with Roland Pertwee). He also wrote the Two White Arms which became a successful film. In 1943, he married Ann Verity Gibson Watt, and they had four children.

He died at his home in Hay-on-Wye from cerebral thrombosis.

== Spiritualism ==
Dearden was skeptical of claims of psychical phenomena and spiritualism. In his book Devilish But True: The Doctor Looks at Spiritualism (1936), he compared cases of witchcraft to spiritualist mediums. He noted the similarity of hysterical behaviour and hallucinations.

In 1927, he wrote an article How Spiritualists are Deluded. Dearden attended séances and was a judge for a group formed by the Sunday Chronicle to investigate the materialization medium Harold Evans. During a séance Evans was exposed as a fraud. He was caught masquerading as a spirit, in a white nightshirt.

== Publications ==
- Insanity: Prevention or Cure? (1922)
- The Moral Imbecile (1922)
- The Technique of Living (1924)
- The Doctor Looks at Life (1924)
- The Science of Happiness (1925)
- Exercise and the Will: With a Chapter on Obesity (1927)
- How Spiritualists are Deluded (1927)
- Medicine and Duty: The First World War Diary of Dr Harold Dearden (1928, 2014)
- Two White Arms: A Comedy-Farce in Three Acts (1928)
- The Mind of the Murderer (1930)
- Such Women are Dangerous (1933)
- The Fire Raisers: The Story of Leopold Harris and His Gang (1934)
- A Confessor of Women (1934)
- Queer People (1935)
- Devilish But True: The Doctor Looks at Spiritualism (1936)
- The Wind of Circumstance (1938)
- Time and Chance (1940)
- Creation's Heir (1947)
- Some Cases of Sir Bernard Spilsbury and Others: Death Under the Microscope (1948)
