= Lesley Wareing =

British actress (1913–1988)

- Born: 16 October 1913; Hampstead, London; United Kingdom
- Died: 13 April 1988 (aged 74); Faversham, Kent; United Kingdom
- Years active: 1931–1939

Lesley Hyldyn Shona Wareing (16 October 1913 – 13 April 1988) was a British actress who appeared in a number of films between 1931 and 1939. She was born in Hampstead, London in 1913 and made her debut in the 1931 film Men Like These. She appeared in the 1935 film Fighting Stock.

== Selected filmography ==
- Men Like These (1931)
- Josser Joins the Navy (1932)
- The Iron Duke (1934)
- Fighting Stock (1935)
- It's You I Want (1936)
- Bedtime Story (1938)
- The Terror (1938)
