= Seeing Is Believing (film) =

1934 film directed by Redd Davis

- Directed by: Redd Davis
- Written by: Donovan Pedelty
- Starring: William Hartnell; Gus McNaughton; Faith Bennett
- Production company: British and Dominions
- Distributed by: Paramount British Pictures
- Release date: February 1934
- Running time: 70 minutes
- Country: United Kingdom
- Language: English

Seeing Is Believing is a 1934 British comedy crime film directed by Redd Davis and starring William Hartnell, Gus McNaughton and Faith Bennett. It was written by Donovan Pedelty, and made at British and Dominions Elstree Studios as a quota quickie for release by Paramount Pictures.

== Plot ==
Ronald Gibson joins the police force much against the wish of his father, a wealthy shipowner, who employs Geoffrey Cooper and Marion Harvey, two private detectives, to see that he is discharged. While in his father's office Ronald sees Nita leonard take a necklace out of her handbag and, believing that he is on the trail of a thief, follows her on a pleasure cruise. Geoffrey and Marion follow him, and he thinks that they are a couple of crooks. After many misadventures Ronald finds that he has been hoaxed, but Nita's love affords him ample compensation.

Ronald Gibson joins the police force against the wishes of his father, a shipping magnate, who hires two private detectives, Geoffrey Cooper and Marion Harvey, to orchestrate Ronald's dismissal. While visiting his father's office, Ronald spots a woman named Nita Leonard removing a necklace from a handbag. Convinced he has stumbled onto a major jewel robbery, he follows her onto a cruise. ship to crack the case. Geoffrey and Marion shadow him on the voyage, leading a clueless Ronald to believe they are a pair of dangerous crooks. Following a string of chaotic misadventures, Ronald finally learns that the entire scenario was a giant hoax, but finding love with Nita proves to be his compensation.

== Cast ==
- William Hartnell as Ronald Gibson
- Gus McNaughton as Geoffrey Cooper
- Faith Bennett as Marion Harvey
- Vera Bogetti as Nita Leonard
- Fewlass Llewellyn as Sir Robert Gibson
- Joana Pereira as Mme. Bellini
- Elsie Irving as Lady Mander
- Pat Baring

== Reception ==
Kine Weekly wrote: "Farcical comedy which follows familiar paths until the journey turns from enjoyment to tedium. The complications take far too long to straighten out, and repetition dilutes the humour until the situations become unfunny. The players work hard, but direction is not good enough to ensure that they receive rewards commensurate with their efforts."

The Daily Film Renter wrote: "Nonsensical story of earnest young policeman who follows supposed jewel thieves in order to prove detective abilities. Development on strained farce lines, with central theme subordinated to welter of knockabout incident, against background of pleasure cruise. Film has a few laughs and feeble romantic element, and rates as quota fare for easily pleased."

Picture Show called the film "a rather tedious comedy."

Picturegoer wrote: "Slight farcial comedy which runs much too long for the strength of its material and ends by becoming very tedious."
