= The Birthday Present =

1957 British film by Pat Jackson

- Theatrical release poster
- Directed by: Pat Jackson
- Screenplay by: Jack Whittingham
- Produced by: Jack Whittingham
- Starring: Tony Britton; Sylvia Syms
- Cinematography: Ted Scaife
- Edited by: Jocelyn Jackson
- Music by: Clifton Parker
- Production company: British Lion Film Corporation
- Distributed by: British Lion Film Corporation (U.K.)
- Release dates: 31 October 1957 (London, UK)
- Running time: 100 minutes
- Country: United Kingdom
- Language: English

The Birthday Present is a 1957 British drama film directed by Pat Jackson and starring Tony Britton and Sylvia Syms. The screenplay was by Jack Whittingham who also produced the film for British Lion Films.

== Plot ==
Simon Scott, a top toy salesman, returns from a business trip to Germany with a watch hidden inside a toy intended as a birthday present for his wife Jean. He is caught by customs, arrested, and the following day sentenced to three months’ imprisonment for smuggling. He is taken to Wormwood Scrubs. He is not the normal type of prisoner, wearing a three-piece suit with a silk tie. He is taken to a spartan cell.

As he pleads guilty there is no right of appeal, other than against the length of sentence. He tells his wife an appeal is too costly and will take too long.

His wife tells his employer’s managing director, Colonel Wilson, that, contrary to earlier reports, Simon has not been sick but is serving a prison sentence. Wilson tries to keep the information to himself but colleagues eventually find out. Privately he decides he would allow Simon to return to work following his release.

However, when Simon does next meet him, the MD regretfully tells him that a board meeting has decided that he cannot continue to work for them (as marketing manager of their toy factory). An employment agency warns Scott that many professional people with a criminal record are forced back into crime due to the inability to find employment. His wife then takes a job (as a photographic model) in order to support them. Simon eventually has an offer of a similar job at another factory (without divulging his crime at the interview) but after saying he has the job they call his old employer for a reference, are told the truth and decide to withdraw the offer.

However, Wilson, who remains convinced he took the right decision at his earlier meeting with Simon, forcefully debates the issue with the directors and points out if he had been fined rather than going to prison they would have a different attitude.

The film ends with Simon receiving a letter from Wilson saying he can return after all.

== Cast ==
- Tony Britton as Simon Scott
- Sylvia Syms as Jean Scott
- Jack Watling as Bill Thompson
- Geoffrey Keen as Colonel Wilson
- Walter Fitzgerald as Sir John Dell
- David Hutcheson as ex. R.A.F. type
- Thorley Walters as photographer
- Richard Leech as Hawkins
- John Welsh as chief customs officer
- Lockwood West as Mr. Barraclough
- Ernest Clark as barrister
- Cyril Luckham as magistrate
- Harry Fowler as Charlie
- James Raglan as prison governor
- Victor Brooks as 2nd reception officer
- Ian Bannen as junior customs officer
- Howard Marion-Crawford as George Bates
- Frederick Piper as careers officer
- Anthony Sagar as 1st reception officer
- Barry Keegan as junior reception officer
- Malcolm Keen as Bristow
- Laidman Brown as Dawson
- Arnold Bell as Green
- Michael Warre as Jerry
- Ralph Michael as Crowther
- Gay Cameron as Ruth
- Frances Rowe as secretary
- Jeremy Burnham as Dudley
- Howard Lang as cell block officer
- Glyn Houston as police officer in court

== Production ==
The film was the first production from Jack Whittingham Productions Ltd, a new company formed by Jack Whittingham and Pat Jackson. The film was shot at Shepperton Studios and released by British Lion.

Pat Jackson considered it one of his favourite films, calling it "an honest piece of filmmaking, with a lovely performance from Sylvia Syms. It was a very interesting and well written script."

== Reception ==
Pat Jackson said "it got wonderful, wonderful notices... didn't do commercially well because Asian 'flu if you remember, hit London very badly, it was all sort of at that time."

The Monthly Film Bulletin wrote: "The intention of making a film about the problems of a man released from gaol is creditable enough, and the authors of the story evidently intended to bring home a serious point. Unfortunately, the good intentions are not entirely realised by the film. For a start, the treatment is novelettish, and the problem handled and solved at a purely sentimental level. Moreover, the direction so lacks real force and conviction, that the final impression is of a technically competent piece of commercial film-making – clean, smooth, hygienic and quite unpoetic. The morale and the way of life the film exposes seem too much inspired by Customs regulations and the travelling salesman's handbook."

Kine Weekly wrote: "The acting is highly competent and the insight into human behaviour keen, but the prison sequences are somewhat protracted. ...Tony Britton contributes a smooth study as the immaculate and confident though foolish Simon, Sylvia Syms is most appealing as the loyal Jean, and Geoffrey Keen and Walter Fitzgerald impress as Wilson and Sir John. The supporting types, too, are accurately etched. The kaleidoscopic opening has colour and the concluding reels thrust home its stern moral, but during its middle stages a little too much attention is paid to prison detail."

Variety called it "smooth but uninspired".

The Radio Times wrote: "doleful, overlong slice of surburban life."

Allmovie called it "a bitter half-hour anecdote stretched to 100 minutes... Intended as a slice of raw realism, Birthday Present plays more like a cautionary social studies film."

TV Guide said, "All-around fine technical efforts add a sense of authenticity."

Filmink called it "a hidden gem".
