= Donovan Pedelty =

British journalist, film director and screenwriter (1903–1989)

- Born: Joseph Cecil Donovan Pedelty; 26 July 1903; Tynemouth, England; United Kingdom
- Died: 12 March 1989 (aged 85); Eureka Springs, Arkansas; United States
- Occupations: Film director, Editor
- Years active: 1933–1938 (film)

Donovan Pedelty (1903–1989) was a British journalist, screenwriter and film director.

During the 1930s, Pedelty specialised in making quota quickies with Irish themes. These were generally not well received by critics.

== Filmography ==
=== Director ===
- School for Stars (1935)
- Flame in the Heather (1935)
- School for Stars (1935)
- The Luck of the Irish (1936)
- The Early Bird (1936)
- Irish and Proud of It (1936)
- Behind Your Back (1937)
- First Night (1937)
- Landslide (1937)
- False Evidence (1937)
- Bedtime Story (1938)
- Murder Tomorrow (1938)

=== Screenwriter ===
- The Little Damozel (1933)
- That's a Good Girl (1933)
- Seeing Is Believing (1934)
- City of Beautiful Nonsense (1935)
- Brewster's Millions (1935)
- Radio Pirates (1935)
- Two on a Doorstep (1936)

== Bibliography ==
- Chibnall, Steve. Quota Quickies: The Birth of the British 'B' Film. British Film Institute, 2007.
