= Second Thoughts (1938 film) =

1938 film

- Frank Fox and A. Bromley Davenport in the film.
- Directed by: Albert Parker
- Written by: David Evans
- Starring: Frank Fox; Evelyn Ankers; Frank Allenby
- Cinematography: Ronald Neame
- Production company: 20th Century Fox- British Pictures
- Distributed by: Twentieth Century Fox Film Company (UK)
- Release date: 1938
- Running time: 61min
- Country: United Kingdom
- Language: English

Second Thoughts (also known as The Crime of Peter Frame) is a 1938 British drama film directed by Albert Parker and starring Frank Fox, Evelyn Ankers, Frank Allenby and Joan Hickson. It was written by David Evans, and was made at Wembley Studios as a quota quickie by the British subsidiary of 20th Century Fox.

== Preservation status ==
The British Film Institute National Archive holds a collection of stills but no film or video materials.

== Synopsis ==
The screenplay concerns a chemist who is left unhinged following a laboratory explosion and begins to plot a murder.

== Cast ==
- Frank Fox as Tony Gordon
- Evelyn Ankers as Molly Frame
- Frank Allenby as Peter Frame
- A. Bromley Davenport as George Gaunt
- Marjorie Fielding as Mrs Gaunt
- Joan Hickson as Ellen
- Bill Shine as minor role

== Critical reception ==
The Monthly Film Bulletin wrote: "The coincidences and constructions put on innocent behaviour are well within the bounds of probability and give the film its air of reality. The end of the film has a subtlety which is unusual in this type of film. The dialogue is good, the acting excellent. The film is well cast, and the direction has fine touches."

Picturegoer wrote: "Very obvious plot, but one which has some good dramatic moments. Frank Allenby does justice to the leading role ... Evelyn Ankers is an adequate heroine, while sound performances come from A. Bromley Davenport and Marjorie Fielding."

Picture Show wrote: "A rather dull and wearisome drama ... quite well acted."

TV Guide called it an "Undistinguished second feature in spite of all the spent rage."
