= Roy Pomeroy =

Special effects designer

- Born: April 10, 1892; Darjeeling, India
- Died: September 3, 1947 (aged 55); Los Angeles, California, United States
- Occupation: Special effects artist
- Years active: 1923-1934

Roy Pomeroy (April 20, 1892 – September 3, 1947) was an American special effects artist and film director. One of the only three technicians that founded the Academy of Motion Picture Arts and Sciences, he was awarded the Academy Award for Engineering Effects for the film Wings at the 1st Academy Awards.

== Biography ==
Pomeroy's career began during the silent era, when he worked as a special effects engineer for Famous Players–Lasky and its successor studio Paramount Pictures. For 1923's The Ten Commandments, Pomeroy designed the parting of the Red Sea sequence and an effect in which the commandments appeared in letters of flame. He worked on Peter Pan, Old Ironsides, and The Rough Riders, all for Famous Players or Paramount. His work on the groundbreaking aviation film Wings, released in 1927, earned him the Academy Award for Engineering Effects at the first-ever Academy Awards ceremony.

Pomeroy was head of research at Paramount, and experimented on an ultimately unsuccessful device to add sound to the studio's large-format Magnascope process. He was sent to visit the RCA and Western Electric sound laboratories to study Vitaphone sound technology, and upon his return was treated by studio workers and executives as an expert. Jesse Lasky said, "We couldn't have treated him with more awe and homage if he had been Edison himself." Propman Joe Youngerman said, "He threw his weight around. He claimed he knew all about it."

In 1928, Paramount decided it was ready to release an "all-talkie", a film with synchronized dialogue throughout rather than in select scenes. They chose Interference, a silent film directed by Lothar Mendes that had been completed but not yet released. Pomeroy was assigned to reshoot the film with sound. He demanded—and received—a pay raise from $250 per week to $2,500. The silent and sound versions were released simultaneously; the sound version was better regarded by critics, but still detracted for stilted dialogue. However, the sound techniques were praised for their relative sophistication (the critic Mordaunt Hall noted that the audience "even heard a pen scratching its way over the paper as Evelyn Brent wrote a message"), anticipating many elements commonplace today; in particular, a scene in which one character is crying shows not the character crying but a reaction shot of her lover, placing the attention on his emotional reaction rather than insistently displaying the source of the sound.

After being tapped for his next directing assignment, Pomeroy asked for another raise to $3,500 a week. The studio balked and reassigned the project to William DeMille instead, and Pomeroy resigned from the studio. He directed two more sound films: Inside the Lines for RKO in 1930, and Shock for W.T. Lackey Productions in 1934. Pomeroy was passionate about archery and kept a collection of bows in his studio office.

== Filmography ==
- Peter Pan (1924)
- Wings (1927)
- Interference (1928)
- Inside the Lines (1930)
- Shock (1934)
