= Ernest Palmer (British cinematographer) =

British cinematographer (1901–1964)

- Born: Harold Ernest Palmer; March 1901; St Pancras, London, England
- Died: 12 March 1964 (aged 62–63); West Ealing, London, England
- Occupation: Cinematographer

Harold Ernest Palmer (March 1901 – 12 March 1964) was a British cinematographer. He worked on some 130 feature films and TV series episodes between 1930 and 1963.

== Selected filmography ==
- Children of Chance (1930)
- Children of Fortune (1931)
- The Innocents of Chicago (1932)
- After Office Hours (1932)
- Verdict of the Sea (1932)
- The Ghost Camera (1933)
- The Umbrella (1933)
- His Grace Gives Notice (1933)
- Flood Tide (1934)
- The River Wolves (1934)
- The Admiral's Secret (1934)
- Music Hall (1934)
- Whispering Tongues (1934)
- The Black Abbot (1934)
- The Ace of Spades (1935)
- While Parents Sleep (1935)
- That's My Uncle (1935)
- Death on the Set (1935)
- Birds of a Feather (1936)
- Grand Finale (1936)
- The Man Behind the Mask [a.k.a. Behind the Mask (UK reissue title)] (1936)
- The Edge of the World (1937)
- Rhythm Racketeer (1937)
- The Last Chance (1937)
- Save a Little Sunshine (1938)
- Too Many Husbands (1938)
- Murder Tomorrow (1938)
- Bedtime Story (1938)
- What a Man! (1938)
- The Stars Look Down (1939) [uncredited]
- The Spider (1940)
- Law and Disorder (1940)
- The Next of Kin (1942)
- He Found a Star (1941)
- The Goose Steps Out (1942)
- San Demetrio London (1943)
- For You Alone (1945)
- 29 Acacia Avenue [a.k.a. The Facts of Love (USA)] (1945)
- Murder in Reverse (1945)
- Waltz Time (1945)
- Lisbon Story (1946)
- The Trojan Brothers (1946)
- The Ghosts of Berkeley Square (1947)
- Green Fingers (1947)
- The Three Weird Sisters (1948)
- But Not in Vain (1948)
- School for Randle (1949)
- Let's Have a Murder (1950)
- Over the Garden Wall (1950)
- The Changing Face of Europe [a.k.a. The Grand Design (UK)] (1951) (segment 3 "Somewhere to Live")
- Love's a Luxury (1952)
- It's a Grand Life (1953)
- Take a Powder (1953)
- The Trial of Madame X (1955)
- Assignment Redhead (1956)
- The Heart Within (1957)
- The Woman Eater (1958)
- The Crowning Touch (1959)
