= Two White Arms =

1932 film

- Feature on the film from Picture Show (24 September 1932)
- Directed by: Fred Niblo
- Written by: Harold Dearden
- Produced by: Eric Hakim
- Starring: Adolphe Menjou; Margaret Bannerman; Claud Allister
- Cinematography: Henry W. Gerrard; Henry Harris
- Edited by: Helen Thomas; Lars Moen
- Production company: Eric Hakim Productions
- Distributed by: Metro-Goldwyn-Mayer
- Release date: March 1932
- Running time: 81 minutes
- Country: United Kingdom
- Language: English

Two White Arms (also known as Wives Beware) is a 1932 British comedy film directed by Fred Niblo and starring Adolphe Menjou, Margaret Bannerman and Claud Allister. It was written byHarold Dearden adapted from his 1928 play. Produced by Eric Hakim Productions and backed by MGM, the film was made at Wembley Studios. It was Bannerman's first 'talkie'.

== Preservation status ==
The British Film Institute National Archive holds a collection of ephemera and stills but no film or video materials.

== Plot ==
A man tires of married life and feigns the loss of his memory so he can pursue other women.

== Cast ==
- Adolphe Menjou as Major Carey Liston
- Margaret Bannerman as Lydie Charrington
- Claud Allister as Doctor Biggash
- Jane Baxter as Alison Drury
- Kenneth Kove as Bob Russell
- Ellis Jeffreys as Lady Ellerslie
- René Ray as Trixie
- Jean Cadell as Mrs Drury
- Henry Wenman as Mears
- Spencer Trevor as Sir George
- Melville Cooper as Mack

== Reception ==
Film Weekly wrote: "The mingling of straight romantic drama and calculated absurdity is more than a little disconcerting. The direction and acting are too heavy either to take full advantage of the comedy, or to bring out an underlying note of satire."

Kine Weekly wrote: "The picture meanders from the serious to the comic with uncertainty and seldom succeeds in providing piquant entertainment. The strong cast do their best, but Adolphe Menjou and his support find it difficult to get going and are handicapped my the vague story and its treatment. The good technical work and the indisputable star values represent the main box-office attractions."

== Historical achievement ==
On 6 June 1933, Wives Beware was shown at the Camden Drive-In Theater in Pennsauken, New Jersey, making it the first film shown at a fully dedicated drive-in theater.
