= First Night (film) =

- Jack Livesey and Rani Waller in the film
- Directed by: Donovan Pedelty
- Written by: Donovan Pedelty; G. Sheila Donisthorpe (play)
- Produced by: Victor M. Greene
- Starring: Jack Livesey; Rani Waller; Sunday Wilshin
- Production company: Crusade Films
- Distributed by: Paramount British Pictures
- Release date: July 1937
- Running time: 69 minutes
- Country: United Kingdom
- Language: English

First Night is a 1937 British drama film directed by Donovan Pedelty and starring Jack Livesey, Rani Waller and Sunday Wilshin. It was written by Donovan Pedelty based on the 1937 play by G. Sheila Donisthorpe. It was made at Wembley Studios as a quota quickie.

== Preservation status ==
The British Film Institute National Archive holds a collection of ephemera and stills but no film or video materials.

== Plot ==
Judith Armstrong is a domestic drudge for her selfish mother and sisters, respected only by her sympathetic dentist father who supports her ambition to be a playwright. When a local try-out theatre stages her play, she fall for its handsome producer, Richard Garnet. The show becomes a sensational success, securing a West End run. However, crippled by her inferiority complex, Judith fears public attention and dismisses Garnet’s affection as pity for her. Ultimately, he persuades her to embrace both her first-night triumph, and his love.

== Cast ==
- Jack Livesey as Richard Garnet
- Rani Waller as Judith Armstrong
- Sunday Wilshin as Rosalind Faber
- Ernest Mainwaring as Henry Armstrong
- Margaret Damer as Elaine Armstrong
- Ann Wilton as Ivy
- Felix Erwin as Patterson Luke
- Bill Shine

== Reception ==
The Monthly Film Bulletin wrote: "The story is human and interesting, and worthy of better production than it has been given. There is more dialogue than action, and this of a somewhat psychoanalytical kind, but it is quite effective and acute. The characterisation is life-like. Rani Waller is distinctly good in the difficult part of Judith. Jack Livesey makes an energetic and pleasant young producer, and the supporting parts, including an adenoidal maid, are adequately filled."

Kine Weekly wrote: "Photographed stage play which is alternately Cinderellaish and psycho-therapeutic, and excessively verbose in both. May succeed on sentiment if not on science as a second-feature proposition for popular halls. ... Rani Waller does quite well in the obviously difficult role of a heroine, who spends most of her time psycho-analysing herself, and a little more sympathy might have been thrown her way. ... The dialogue is reasonably good, which is just as well, as there is a tremendous lot of it. Even so, there are some lines in the course of Judith's non-stop soul-searchings that may get laughs in the wrong places. The main trouble is, however, that while the theme is mainly sophisticated, the treatment is not."

Picture Show wrote: "Dull, rather stagy drama of a family Cinderella who blossoms forth as a playwright, but is afraid of success. It is loaded with dialogue and has little action. Competently acted."
