= Father O'Nine =

- Directed by: Roy Kellino
- Written by: Harold G. Brown (from a story by)
- Produced by: Ivor McLaren
- Starring: Hal Gordon; Dorothy Dewhurst; Claire Arnold
- Cinematography: Robert LaPresle
- Edited by: Reginald Beck
- Production company: Fox-British Pictures
- Distributed by: Twentieth Century Fox (UK)
- Release date: 19 December 1938 (UK)
- Running time: 49 minutes
- Country: United Kingdom
- Language: English

Father O'Nine is a 1938 British comedy film directed by Roy Kellino and starring Hal Gordon, Dorothy Dewhurst and Claire Arnold. It was made at Wembley Studios as a quota quickie by the British subsidiary of Twentieth Century Fox. The film's sets were designed by the art director Carmen Dillon.

== Cast ==
- Hal Gordon as Eddie Mills
- Dorothy Dewhurst as Mill Wilson
- Claire Arnold as Miss Pip
- Jimmy Godden as Colonel Briggs
- Denis Cowles as Blenkinsop
- Joe Monkhouse as Albert

== Bibliography ==
- Low, Rachael. Filmmaking in 1930s Britain. George Allen & Unwin, 1985.
- Wood, Linda. British Films, 1927-1939. British Film Institute, 1986.
