= Dorothy Dewhurst =

English stage and film actress (1886–1959)

Dorothy Irene de Singleton Dewhurst (1886 – 12 December 1959) was an English stage and film actress. Born in 1886 in Sale, Cheshire, England, she was married to the actor George Bernard Copping, who died before her. She died on 12 December 1959 in London.

She appeared in multiple films between 1936 and 1959. These include Love at Sea (1936), Father O'Nine (1938), Bedtime Story (1938), and Blackmail Is So Difficult (1959).

She appeared on the stage in multiple performances in London in the 1920s and 1930s. In 1938, she appeared in The Torch Theatre's production of a play by Irish playwright Teresa Deevy called Katie Roche. Produced by Lennox Robinson, there were nine performances. It was the first time it was presented in a London Theatre, having been published in "Famous Plays of 1935-36" after its production in the Abbey Theatre Dublin.

In 1953, she appeared in the original cast of Graham Greene's first play, The Living Room, which premiered at Wyndham's Theatre, London, and was produced by Peter Glenville.

== Filmography ==
Sourced from the British Film Institute, unless otherwise stated.

- Blackmail Is So Difficult (1959)
- Arsenic and Old Lace (1958)
- Hedda Gabler (1957)
- Absence of Mind (1955)
- Raising a Riot (1955)
- The Lark Still Sings (1954)
- Pride and Prejudice (1952)
- Eden End (1951)
- Stranger at My Door (1950)
- Old Mother Riley Joins Up (1939)
- Bedtime Story (1938)
- Father O'Nine (1938)
- Behind Your Back (1937)
- Wings of the Morning (1937)
- Passenger to London (1937)
- Two on a Doorstep (1936)
- Grand Finale (1936)
- Love at Sea (1936)
- Full Speed Ahead (1936)

== Selected stage appearances ==
- Katie Roche (1938)
- The Living Room (1953)
