= Bedtime Story (1938 film) =

1938 British film by Donovan Pedelty

- Directed by: Donovan Pedelty
- Written by: Donovan Pedelty
- Produced by: Victor M. Greene
- Starring: Jack Livesey; Lesley Wareing; Eliot Makeham
- Cinematography: Ernest Palmer
- Production company: Admiral Films
- Distributed by: Grand National Pictures
- Release date: March 1938
- Running time: 71 minutes
- Country: United Kingdom
- Language: English

Bedtime Story is a 1938 British comedy drama film directed by Donovan Pedelty and starring Jack Livesey, Lesley Wareing and Eliot Makeham. It was made as a quota quickie at Cricklewood Studios.

== Cast ==
- Jack Livesey as Sir John Shale
- Lesley Wareing as Judy
- Eliot Makeham as Uncle Toby
- Dorothy Dewhurst as Lady Blundell
- Margery Morris as Isabel
- Michel Bazalgette as Prince
- Jonathan Field as Butler

== Bibliography ==
- Chibnall, Steve. Quota Quickies: The Birth of the British 'B' Film. British Film Institute, 2007.
- Low, Rachael. Filmmaking in 1930s Britain. George Allen & Unwin, 1985.
- Wood, Linda. British Films, 1927-1939. British Film Institute, 1986.
