= Liam Gaffney =

Irish actor (1911–1994)

Liam Gaffney. Photo: John Vickers

Liam Gaffney (22 June 1911 – July 1994) was an Irish stage, film and television actor. His stage work included appearances with Dublin's Abbey Theatre, and in London's West End.

== Selected filmography ==
- Irish and Proud of It (1936)
- Macushla (1937)
- The Londonderry Air (1938)
- The Villiers Diamond (1938)
- The Four Just Men (1939)
- The Parnell Commission (1939, TV film)
- Dr. O'Dowd (1940)
- Captain Boycott (1947)
- The Bad Lord Byron (1949)
- The Case of Charles Peace (1949)
- The Lady with the Lamp (1951)
- Curtain Up (1952)
- My Death Is a Mockery (1952)
- Women of Twilight (1952)
- Mantrap (1953)
- Street of Shadows (1953)
- Rooney (1958)
- Jazz Boat (1960)
- The Trials of Oscar Wilde (1960)
- Island of Terror (1966)
