= A Song for Tomorrow =

1948 British film by Terence Fisher

- Original British quad poster
- Directed by: Terence Fisher
- Screenplay by: W.E.C. Fairchild
- Story by: W.E.C. Fairchild
- Produced by: Ralph Nunn-May
- Starring: Ralph Michael; Evelyn Maccabe
- Cinematography: Walter J. Harvey (as Walter Harvey)
- Edited by: Gordon Pilkington
- Music by: William Blezard
- Production companies: Highbury Productions; Production Facilities
- Distributed by: General Film Distributors (UK)
- Release date: 7 June 1948 (UK)
- Running time: 60 minutes
- Country: United Kingdom
- Language: English

A Song for Tomorrow is a 1948 second feature ('B') drama film directed by Terence Fisher in his directorial debut. It stars Evelyn Maccabe and Ralph Michael. The screenplay by W.E.C. Fairchild concerns a World War II fighter pilot who suffers amnesia.

== Premise ==
Derek Wardell is a World War II RAF fighter pilot who suffers amnesia, remembering only the voice of opera singer Helen Maxwell, with whom he falls in love.

== Cast ==
- Ralph Michael as Roger Stanton
- Evelyn Maccabe as Helen Maxwell
- Shaun Noble as Derek Wardell
- James Hayter as Nicholas Klaussman
- Valentine Dunn as Mrs Wardell
- Christopher Lee as Auguste
- Conrad Phillips as Lieutenant Fenton
- Ethel Coleridge as woman in cinema
- Carleen Lord as Helen's dresser
- Yvonne Forster as nurse
- Martin Boddey as Major
- Sam Kydd as Sergeant
- Lockwood West as Mr Stokes

== Production ==
It was made at Highbury Studios.

== Critical reception ==
The Monthly Film Bulletin wrote: "The script, production and acting are shoddy and insignificant. The only redeeming feature of the film is the contralto voice of Evelyn McCabe, which gives an unexpected richness to an otherwise poor effort."

Kine Weekly wrote: "'On the cuff' dramatic musical, with psychiatric trimmings. It introduces Evelyn McCabe, a most promising vocalist, but it has little else to recommend it. The acting is, with a few exceptions, amateurish, and the script novelettish. Poor."

TV Guide wrote, "A touch of amnesia on the audience's part would help them forget this insipid mess."
