= Flame in the Heather =

- Directed by: Donovan Pedelty
- Written by: Donovan Pedelty; Esson Maule (novel)
- Produced by: Victor M. Greene
- Starring: Gwenllian Gill; Barry Clifton; Bruce Seton
- Cinematography: Stanley Grant
- Production company: Crusade Films
- Distributed by: Paramount British Pictures
- Release date: September 1935
- Running time: 66 minutes
- Country: United Kingdom
- Language: English

Flame in the Heather is a 1935 British historical drama film directed by Donovan Pedelty and starring Gwenllian Gill, Barry Clifton and Bruce Seton. It was made as a quota quickie at British and Dominions Elstree Studios. Much of the film was shot on location around Fort William. It was fairly unusual as a low-budget quota film to be set in the past, as most films tended to have contemporary settings.

== Plot ==
During the Jacobite Rebellion, an English spy infiltrates the Clan Cameron, but falls in love with the chief's daughter.

== Cast ==
- Gwenllian Gill as Alison
- Barry Clifton as Colonel Stafford
- Bruce Seton as Murray
- Richard Hayward as Fassiefern
- Ben Williams as Rushton
- Kenneth McLaglen as Donald
- Rani Waller as Myrat
- Francis de Wolff as Hawley

== Bibliography ==
- Chibnall, Steve. Quota Quickies: The Birth of the British 'B' Film. British Film Institute, 2007.
- Low, Rachael. Filmmaking in 1930s Britain. George Allen & Unwin, 1985.
- Wood, Linda. British Films, 1927–1939. British Film Institute, 1986.
