= Interference (film) =

1928 film by Lothar Mendes

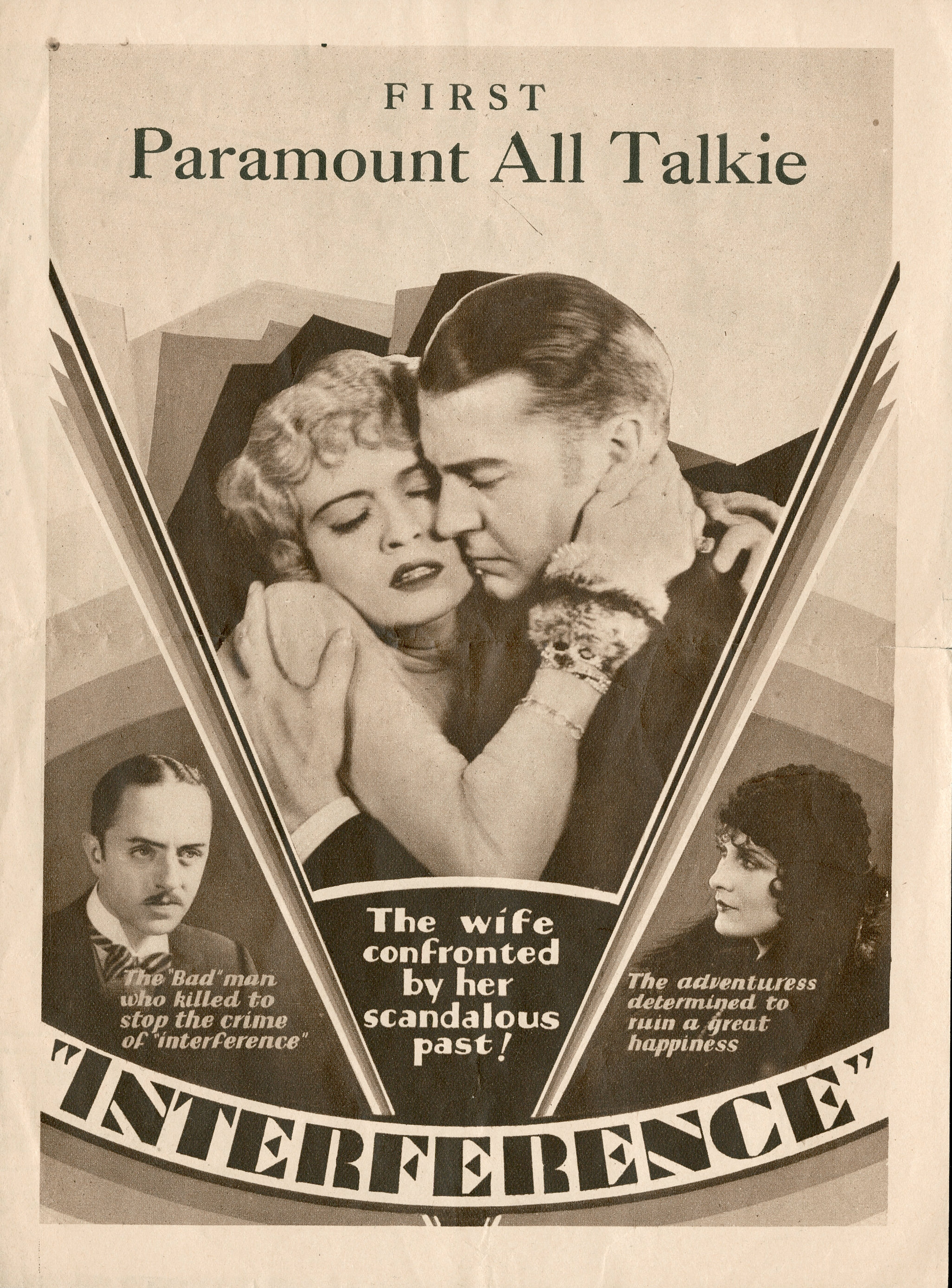
- Directed by: Lothar Mendes (silent version); Roy J. Pomeroy (sound version)
- Written by: Roland Pertwee (play); Harold Dearden (play); Louise Long; Hope Loring (screenplay); Ernest Pascal (dialogue); Julian Johnson (titles)
- Produced by: J. G. Bachmann
- Starring: Clive Brook; William Powell; Evelyn Brent
- Cinematography: Henry W. Gerrard; Farciot Edouart; J. R. Hunt
- Edited by: George Nichols Jr.
- Music by: W. Franke Harling
- Production company: Paramount Pictures
- Distributed by: Paramount Pictures
- Release dates: November 16, 1928 (New York City); January 5, 1929 (US)
- Running time: 10 reels
- Country: United States
- Languages: English; Also silent version with English intertitles

The full film

Interference is a 1928 American pre-Code drama film directed by Lothar Mendes, as Paramount Pictures' first feature-length all-talking motion picture. It stars Clive Brook, William Powell, Evelyn Brent, and Doris Kenyon, all making their sound film debuts. In England, when a first husband turns out not to be dead, blackmail leads to murder.

== Plot ==
At a Remembrance Day service in London, Deborah Kane spots her old flame Philip Voaze who was supposedly killed during World War I. She discovers that he has actually survived the fighting and has been living under an assumed identity. Aware that his wife Faith is now remarried to Sir John Marlay, a famous heart surgeon, she tries to force Philip to return to her by threatening to reveal Faith's inadvertent bigamy. Philip eventually concludes that the only way to defend Faith's present happiness is to kill Deborah.

== Cast ==
- William Powell as Philip Voaze
- Evelyn Brent as Deborah Kane
- Clive Brook as Sir John Marlay
- Doris Kenyon as Faith Marlay
- Tom Ricketts as Charles Smith
- Brandon Hurst as Inspector Haynes
- Louis Payne as Childers
- Wilfred Noy as Dr. Gray
- Donald Stuart as Freddie
- Clyde Cook as Hearse Driver

== Production ==
The film was originally produced as a silent which was directed by Lothar Mendes. However, after its completion, Paramount halted its release and decided to remake the film completely in sound. The sound version was directed by special effects technician-turned-director Roy J. Pomeroy, as the basis for Paramount Pictures' first feature-length all-talking motion picture. Since Pomeroy lacked experience as a director, he was assisted by William deMille during the filming. It was based on the 1927 West End play Interference by Roland Pertwee and Harold Dearden. It was shot on a budget of $250,000. A silent version was also released to cater for theaters that had not yet wired for sound. While the sound version survives, the silent version is now lost.

In 1935, it was remade by Paramount as Without Regret.

== Critical reception ==
The film was praised in the New York Times as "a specimen of the strides made by the talking picture". However, a Variety review was more negative, describing Interference as "indifferent entertainment".

At the London premiere, Clive Brook's mother remembered a gaffe during the screening that put the crowd in an uproar. In one scene, Brook receives a postcard, tears it up and says, "Another one of those damn postcards." The needle on the disk for sound got stuck and kept repeating, "Another one of those damn postcards," over and over again while Brook, on-screen, took his wife into his arms and kissed her.

== See also ==
- List of early sound feature films (1926–1929)

== Bibliography ==
- Bryant, Roger. William Powell: The Life and Films. McFarland, 2014.
