= G. Sheila Donisthorpe =

British novelist and playwright (1898–1946)

- Born: 17 December 1898; London
- Died: 1 September 1946 (aged 47)
- Occupations: Novelist, playwright
- Notable work: Loveliest of Friends! (novel, 1931); Children to Bless You! (play, 1936)
- Spouse: Frank Wordsworth Donisthorpe

Gladys Sheila Donisthorpe (17 December 1898 – 1 September 1946), born Gladys Millie Leon, was a London-born novelist and playwright.

== Personal life ==
Donisthorpe was born as Gladys Millie Leon in London in 1898.

In 1916, Donisthorpe married British inventor and tennis player Frank Wordsworth Donisthorpe, son of Wordsworth Donisthorpe. Donisthorpe was eighteen years old, and the two married in Southwark, England. Her name changed to Gladys Sheila Donisthorpe.

== Career ==
Donisthorpe composed advertising copy for Selfridges department stores. Donisthorpe's first novel, You (1928), was called "a childishly immature, pretentious, and trivial book, with no artistic excuse for its existence" in an American newspaper. Her next novel was the pulpy Loveliest of Friends! (1931), a cautionary story about married women seduced into lesbian relationships. "If the book is a trifle wordy, the words are all of a dark, poisonous, decadent beauty, a lush pornography, like the tale," commented a North Carolina reviewer. A Boston reviewer considered it "an unhappy and revolting novel." The novel was popular in the United States and Great Britain, going through several editions.

Of Loveliest of Friends! and its lesbian themes, Neil Pearson wrote: "since everything else Donisthorpe wrote seems to have been drawn from life it’s probably safe to assume that Loveliest of Friends describes a phase in her personal development”, but that with the content of the book in mind and how anti-lesbian it was, “[Donisthorpe] wasn’t gay, and it shows.”

Plays by Donisthorpe included Children to Bless You! (1935-1936), First Night (1937), Guests at Lancaster Gate, Mermaid's Gout, Other People's Houses (1941), Gaily We Set Out, Society Blues, and Fruit of the Tree. One of her novels was adapted for film as First Night (1937); another play by Donisthorpe, Children to Bless You!, was broadcast live on British television.

Donisthorpe published a memoir in 1943 titled Show Business: A Book of the Theatre.

== Selected publications ==
- You (1927, novel; serialized in The Smart Set in 1928)
- Loveliest of Friends! (1931, novel)
- The Blind Journey (1933, novel)
- Sets Your Star (1933, novel)
- Children, to bless you (1936, play)
- Show business; a book of the theatre (1943, memoir)
- Fruit of the tree (play)

== Death ==
Donisthorpe died in 1946, aged 47 years.
