= Phyllis Ryan (actress) =

Irish actor and producer (1920–2011)

- Born: 27 May 1920
- Died: 6 June 2011 (aged 91)
- Occupations: Actress; director; producer

Phyllis Ryan (27 May 1920 – 6 June 2011) was an Irish actress, founder, producer, dramaturg and artistic director. During 1936–1944 and 2000 she was involved with the Abbey Theatre where she appeared in many productions. In 1939 she toured with the Abbey Theatre and appeared in a production by Irish playwright Teresa Deevy called The King of Spain's Daughter; there were 16 performances in all from September to November.

She launched Orion Productions in 1956. In 1958 came Gemini Productions, based for many years in Dublin's Eblana Theatre in Busáras.

In the 1960s and 1970s Ryan was the major producer of new plays in Ireland outside of the Abbey Theatre. Phyllis Ryan and her Gemini Productions kept independent theatre alive in Dublin and premièred most of the work of playwright John B. Keane. The playwrights – Brian Friel, Joe O'Donnell, Tom Murphy and others – that Gemini nurtured were later adopted by the Abbey and other theatres.

She wrote and published her memoirs, The Company I Kept, in 1996.

== Career ==
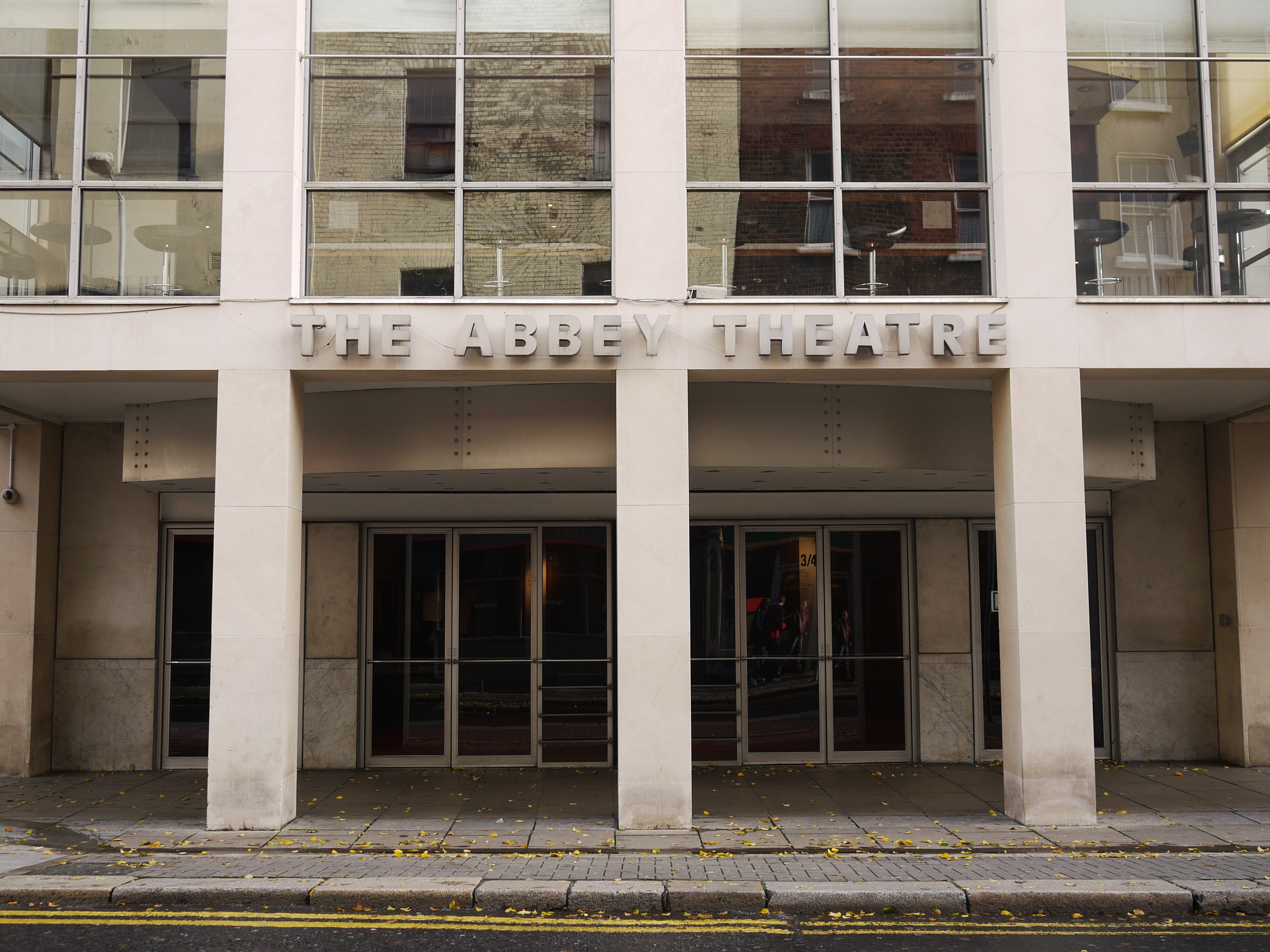
Ryan started acting in the Abbey Theatre in 1934, getting her first role in 1936

Ryan joined the Abbey Company in 1934 at age 14. Ryan's' career began in 1936 when playing Blanaid in The Moon in the Yellow River a Denis Johnston's play. In 1936 she performed in 6 plays, 3 of which were in the Abbey, two in the Peacock and she toured in The New Gossoon by George Shiels in Cork Opera House for three performances. The following year in 1937 she starred in Shadow and Substance as the lead, Brigid. This position got her a recommendation to become a member of the Abbey Company. The play had a total of 12 performances in the Abbey in which Ryan portrayed the lead for a total of 9 of those shows from 1937 to 1944, including their tour in 1940 to the Cork Opera House. She had performed for both Abbey and Peacock in over 28 productions. she had worked with people such as Cyril Cusack, Eileen Crowe, Shelah Richards, Ria Mooney and Barry Fitzgerald.

She launched two production companies Orion Productions in 1956 and then launched Gemini Productions. Gemini productions held shows in a theatre called the Elbana from 1959. The Eblana Theatre closed in 1995. This theatre was the main house for Gemini Production which debuted plays such as John B. Keane's The Field, King of the Castle by Eugene McCabe, and An Trial by Mairead Ni Ghrada’s. This production company let relatively unknown young writers such as Brian Friel, Hugh Leonard, Fionnuala Flanagan and Keane debut their work to a wide audience. Ryan's last performance in the Abbey Theatre was in 2000 when she was the Chorus in Medea by Euripides, a translation by Kenneth McLeish and Frederic Raphael which had a total of 35 performances beginning Tuesday the 6 of June 2000. She also appeared in The King of Spain's Daughter a play by Teresa Deevy in 1939 on BBC Television.

== Early TV ==
• The King of Spain's Daughter (3 mar 1939)
A play by Teresa Deevy
Writer	Teresa Deevy
Producer	Denis Johnston
Annie Kinsella	Phyllis Ryan
Peter Kinsella	Brefni O'Rorke
Mrs Marks	Ann Clery
Jim Harris	Patrick Boxill
Roddy Mann	Tony Quinn
