= Irish and Proud of It (film) =

- Opening titles
- Directed by: Donovan Pedelty
- Written by: Dorothea Donn-Byrne; David Evans; Donovan Pedelty
- Produced by: Victor M. Greene; Donovan Pedelty
- Starring: Richard Hayward; Dinah Sheridan; Liam Gaffney
- Cinematography: Germain Burger; Geoffrey Faithfull
- Edited by: Hans Nieter
- Music by: Colin Wark
- Production company: Crusade Films
- Distributed by: Paramount Pictures
- Release date: November 1936
- Running time: 78 minutes
- Country: United Kingdom
- Language: English

Irish and Proud of It (also known as Never Go Home) is a 1936 British comedy film directed by Donovan Pedelty and starring Richard Hayward, Dinah Sheridan (in her film debut) and Liam Gaffney. It was written by Dorothea Donn-Byrne, David Evans and Pedelty and was made at Wembley Studios as a quota quickie for release by the British subsidiary of Paramount Pictures.

== Plot ==
Donogh O'Connor is a popular London-based Irish singer announces one evening how much he would love to go home to his home village in rural Ireland. For a prank, some of his friends take him up on this offer. He is kidnapped and deposited on a wild moor. He returns to the village of his youth, slightly disorientated, and battles an American gangster who has taken control of the settlement.

== Cast ==
- Richard Hayward as Donogh O'Connor
- Dinah Sheridan as Moira Flaherty
- Gwenllian Gill as Mary Johnson
- George Pembroke as Mike Finnegan
- Liam Gaffney as Sean Casey
- Herbert Thorpe as Benito Colombo
- Jimmy Mageean as Old Flaherty

== Critical reception ==
Kine Weekly wrote: "An unpretentious gangster romantic comedy drama, with a picturesque Irish setting and appropriate vocal embellishment, this picture offers agreeable entertainment for the family and industrial element. The story definitely has an idea, and this works out in a leisurely but steady way to a satisfactory climax through a well-balanced cordon of rough stuff and refreshing native humor to the accompaniment of tuneful song."

Variety wrote: "Irish is paradoxically one of the best and one of the worst of current crop of Irish film importations around New York from an Irishman's point of view. It has much that makes it an entertaining film but, unfortunately, possesses much distasteful story material that might militate against its success with the Irish. ... Story is totally different from expected Irish entry. it's streamlined in acting and direction, and shows and attempts to do more than play upon the sympathies and sentimentalities of the race, at home and abroad. Has the nostalgic touch of the breed with song reminders, etc., but never stresses same."

Lionel Collier in Picturegoer described the film as, "unpretentious and workmanlike … enlivened by songs" and commented that the "Irish settings give charm to this slowly developed plot." He offered positive comments to the performances of the two lead players and wrote, "Richard Hayward is not excessively virile as O’Connor, but he acts well and sings excellently. Much of the picture’s success relies on his performance. Dinah Sheridan makes her screen debut in this film, and her work shows promise; she has the advantage too, of good looks which photograph well."
