= False Evidence (1937 film) =

- Directed by: Donovan Pedelty
- Written by: Donovan Pedelty
- Based on: 1937 novel I'll Never Tell by Roy Vickers
- Produced by: Victor M. Greene
- Starring: Gwenllian Gill; George Pembroke; Michael Hogarth
- Cinematography: Stanley Grant
- Production company: Crusade Films
- Distributed by: Paramount British Pictures
- Release date: October 1937
- Running time: 71 minutes
- Country: United Kingdom
- Language: English

False Evidence is a 1937 British crime film directed by Donovan Pedelty and starring Gwenllian Gill, George Pembroke and Michael Hogarth. It was written by Pedelty based on the 1937 novel I'll Never Tell by Roy Vickers, and was made as a quota quickie at Wembley Studios.

== Preservation status ==
The British Film Institute National Archive holds a collection of ephemera but no film or video materials.

== Plot ==
Judy Endale, secretary to John Massiter, arranges for a job for her cousin Gerald Wickham, which will enable them to get married. She is shocked to discover that he has married someone else: Annabelle Stirling. Then Judy's uncle is found strangled, as is his friend who has left him a fortune. Judy and Massiter connect the crimes with Annabelle, and realise that Gerald is in danger. When Judy starts to investigate Annabelle's connection with a gang, Gerald is shot and killed, Annabelle is strangled, and the gang leader dies falling from a window. In the aftermath, Massiter takes care of Judy.

== Cast ==
- Gwenllian Gill as Judy Endale
- George Pembroke as John Massiter
- Michael Hogarth as Gerald Wickham
- Daphne Raglan as Annabelle Stirling
- George Pughe as Tom Vanderlam
- Francis Roberts as Inspector Jones
- Langley Howard as Julius Wickham
- Ralph Michael as Police Constable Barlow

== Reception ==
The Monthly Film Bulletin wrote: "The film moves quickly and is exciting, and the characterisation and acting are good. Direction and photography are competent."

The Daily Film Renter wrote: "Unconvincing story of efforts by crooks to secure large legacy. Presented mainly in terms of stilted dialogue, plot is difficult to follow, while sundry killings invest proceedings with ultra-melodramatic touch. George Pembroke rises above material, turning in likeable performance, but remainder of cast members do not shine. Quota fare for uncritical patronage only."

Kine Weekly wrote: "Technical qualities are quite good, but there is too much talk and not enough action for the type of melodrama presented. The characters are never very convincing, which is a pity, since the plot has definite ingenuity of idea."

Picturegoer wrote: "Indifferent acting and lack of action tend to negative an otherwise quite fairly ingenious murder story. The picture would have gained immeasureably by better acting and less dialogue."
