= Stanley Grant =

British cinematographer and special effects expert

- Born: 13 July 1902; Leicester, Leicestershire, England, United Kingdom of Great Britain and Ireland
- Died: May 1993 (aged 90); Maidenhead, Berkshire; United Kingdom
- Other name: William Stanley Grant
- Occupation: Cinematographer
- Years active: 1936–1954

Stanley Grant (13 July 1902 – May 1993) was a British cinematographer and special effects expert. During the 1930s he worked mainly on quota quickies. In the 1940s he was employed on more prestigious films such as David Lean's Oliver Twist.

== Selected filmography ==
=== Cinematographer ===
- Flame in the Heather (1935)
- Full Speed Ahead (1936)
- Find the Lady (1936)
- The Big Noise (1936)
- Highland Fling (1936)
- Blind Man's Bluff (1936)
- The Black Tulip (1937)
- Jennifer Hale (1937)
- East of Ludgate Hill (1937)
- There Was a Young Man (1937)
- False Evidence (1937)
- Behind Your Back (1937)
- The Villiers Diamond (1938)
- Dial 999 (1938)
- The Last Barricade (1938)
- Ghost Ship (1952)

=== Special effects ===
- Uncle Silas (1947)
- Odd Man Out (1947)
- Oliver Twist (1948)

== Bibliography ==
- Phillips, Gene. Beyond the Epic: The Life and Films of David Lean. University Press of Kentucky, 2006.
