= Reginald Pound =

English journalist and biographer (1894–1991)

- Born: 11 November 1894
- Died: 20 May 1991 (aged 96)
- Occupation: Journalist
- Spouse: Cicely Margaret Dawes
- Children: 7

Reginald Pound (11 November 1894 – 20 May 1991) was an English journalist and biographer. He began contributing to newspapers and magazines during the First World War, while serving in the army. After the war he freelanced - his clients including The Radio Times - until the mid-1920s, when he was appointed literary editor of The Daily Express. In the 1930s he was features editor of The Daily Mail. At the beginning of the Second World War he served in the Ministry of Information and then the BBC. In 1942 he was appointed to his last editorial position, as editor of The Strand Magazine.

The first of his biographies, a life of Arnold Bennett, was published in 1952, and paid close attention to Bennett's journalism as well as his fiction. The Times records that Pound had met Bennett several times and "admired his no-nonsense approach to the craft of letters". Pound was elected a Fellow of the Royal Society of Literature in 1953. His second biography, the official life of Lord Northclife, written in collaboration with Northcliffe's nephew Sir Geoffrey Harmsworth, was published in 1959. His later biographies included those of Alfred Munnings (1962), Robert Falcon Scott (1966), Henry Wood (1969), Queen Victoria (1970), Albert, Prince Consort (1973) and A. P. Herbert (1976).

In 1916 Pound married Cicely Margaret Dawes (d. 1985); they had seven children. He died on 20 May 1991, aged 96.

== Selected works ==
- Illustrated History (1928) - illustrated by A. E. Horne
- Their Moods and Mine (1937)
- Turn Left for England: A Sentimental Journey (1939)
- Pound Notes (1940)
- Running Commentary (1943)
- A Maypole in the Strand (1948)
- Arnold Bennett: A Biography (1952)
- Northcliffe (1959) - with Geoffrey Harmsworth
- Selfridge: A Biography (1960)
- The Englishman: A Biography of Sir Alfred Munnings (1962)
- Evans of the Broke: A Biography of Admiral Lord Mountevans (1963)
- Gillies: Surgeon Extraordinary (1964)
- The Lost Generation (1964)
- The Strand Magazine: 1891-1950 (1966); US edition: Mirror of the Century
- Scott of the Antarctic (1966)
- Harley Street (1967)
- Sir Henry Wood (1969)
- Queen Victoria (1970)
- Albert: A Biography of the Prince Consort (1973)
- A. P. Herbert (1976)
