= Inside the Lines (1930 film) =

1930 film

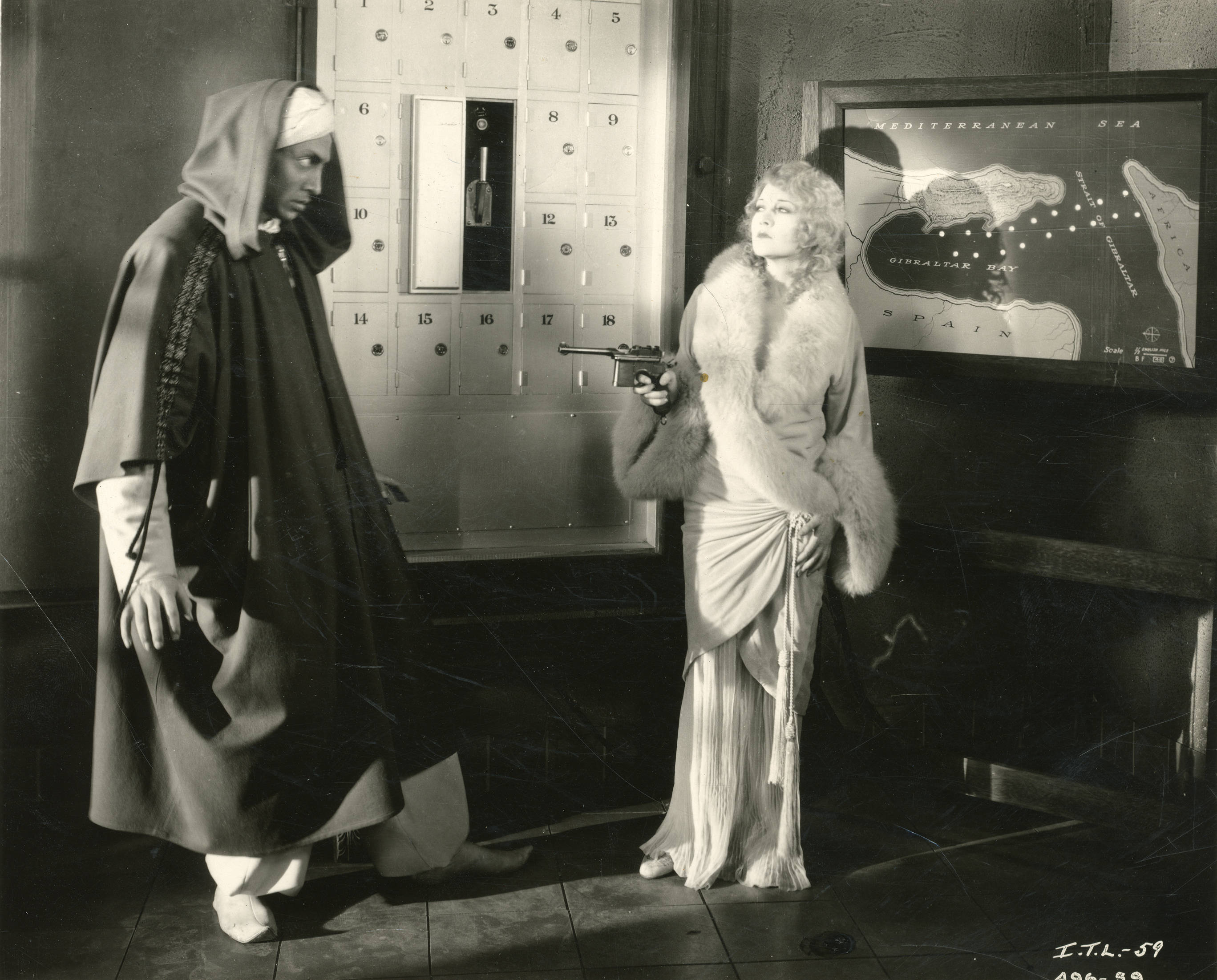
- Still with Auer and Compson
- Directed by: Roy Pomeroy
- Screenplay by: John Farrow; Ewart Adamson
- Based on: Inside the Lines; 1915 play by Earl Derr Biggers
- Produced by: William LeBaron; Roy Pomeroy
- Starring: Betty Compson; Ralph Forbes; Mischa Auer
- Cinematography: Nicholas Musuraca
- Edited by: George Marsh; Ann McKnight
- Music by: Roy Webb
- Production company: RKO Radio Pictures
- Distributed by: RKO Radio Pictures
- Release date: July 5, 1930 (US)
- Running time: 72 minutes
- Country: United States
- Language: English

Full film

Inside the Lines is a 1930 American pre-Code spy drama film starring Betty Compson, Ralph Forbes, and Mischa Auer. It was directed by Roy Pomeroy (who also was the associate producer) from a screenplay by John Farrow and Ewart Adamson, which in turn was based on the 1915 Broadway play of the same name by Earl Derr Biggers. This version is a remake of the 1918 silent version, also with the same name. This film exists in the public domain because the claimants did not renew the copyright after 28 years.

== Plot ==
Jane Gershon is engaged to Eric Woodhouse, living in Germany prior to the onset of World War I. When the war breaks out, they are forced to separate, but are reunited months later in Gibraltar, at the British fortress there. Both are supposedly German spies with orders to destroy the British fleet, anchored in the harbor.

Not fully trusting either of them, the German government has sent another agent, the Hindu Amahdi, to ensure that their sabotage plans are carried out. Both Jane and Eric believe the sincerity of the other as a German agent. When it appears that Jane's attempt to destroy the fleet is uncovered, to save her, Eric takes the blame and seemingly commits suicide. However, when Ahmadi uncovers the truth that Jane is really a double agent for the British government, he attempts to go through with the sabotage. When he is about to kill Jane, Eric reappears and kills him. Jane discovers Eric is also a British double agent and they are happily reunited.

== Cast ==
- Betty Compson as Jane Gershon
- Ralph Forbes as Eric Woodhouse
- Montagu Love as Governor of Gibraltar
- Mischa Auer as Amahdi
- Ivan F. Simpson as Capper (*billed Ivan Simpson)
- Betty Carter as Lady Crandall
- Evan Thomas as Major Bishop
- Wilhelm von Brincken as chief, Secret Service
- https://www.imdb.com/name/nm0788846/>Reginald Sharland as Archie

(cast list is per AFI database)

== Notes ==
The play of the same name, on which this screenplay was based, was produced in 1915 at the Longacre Theatre.

This film is a remake of the 1918 silent version, also titled Inside the Lines, which was directed by David H. Hartford, and starred Lewis Stone and Marguerite Clayton, based on a screenplay by Monte M. Katterjohn. The silent version was produced by Delcah Photoplays, Inc. and Pyramid Film Corporation, and distributed by the World Film Company.

In 1958, the film entered the public domain in the USA due to the copyright claimants failure to renew the copyright registration in the 28th year after publication.

== See also ==
- List of films in the public domain in the United States
