= Macushla (film) =

1937 film by Alex Bryce

- Kitty Kirwan and Pamela Wood in the film.
- Directed by: Alex Bryce
- Production company: Fox-British Pictures
- Release date: 1937
- Running time: 59 minutes
- Country: United Kingdom
- Language: English

Macushla (also known as Unauthorised Road) is a 1937 British comedy drama film directed by Alex Bryce and starring Liam Gaffney, Pamela Wood and Jimmy Mageean. It was made as a quota quickie. The plot concerns a crackdown on an arms smuggling operation across the Northern Irish border. The title of the film refers to the Irish song/term of endearment Macushla.

== Plot ==
Pat Muldoon is an Irish farmer on the Free State border. His son Kerry is involved with a gang of gun-runners, and his daughter Kathleen is in love with police officer Jim O'Grady. When Kerry's gang attempts to ferry guns over the border, Jim and his men intercept their lorry. Kerry shoots an officer, and hides in a local house. When O'Grady and the police break down the door the old woman resident accidentally knocks over a lamp which ignites the house. Kathleen arrives, too late, to warn her brother and is trapped inside the burning house, and when Jim tries to rescue her he is knocked unconscious by a falling beam. Kerry manages to save them both.

== Cast ==
- Pamela Wood as Kathleen Muldoon
- Liam Gaffney as Jim O'Grady
- Jimmy Mageean as Pat Muldoon
- E.J. Kennedy as Hugh Connolly
- Kitty Kirwan as Bridget
- Bryan Herbert as Pat Rooney
- Edgar K. Bruce as Dean McLaglen
- Max Adrian as Kerry Muldoon

== Reception ==
The Monthly Film Bulletin wrote: "Irish comedy drama ranging from 'harmless' cattle smuggling to the more serious business of gun-running. Authentic Irish accent and dialogue make this a pleasantly exciting film."

Kine Weekly wrote: "The theme and scene of this film are sufficiently unhackneyed on the British screen to justify attention. But beyond the pleasing uniformity of the Irish accent little attempt seems to have been made to render the authentic atmosphere of the barrier that divides the Free State from Ulster. In a word, the events, portrayed might have been (except for the accent aforesaid) taking place anywhere picture also lacks body and gusto, and is to a large extent underplayed."
