= List of British films of 1938 =

British films released in 1938

A list of British films released in 1938.

== A–K ==
| Title | Director | Cast | Genre | Notes |
|---|---|---|---|---|
| 13 Men and a Gun | Mario Zampi | Arthur Wontner, Clifford Evans, Allan Jeayes | War | Co-production with Italy |
| Alf's Button Afloat | Marcel Varnel | Bud Flanagan, Chesney Allen, Alastair Sim | Comedy | |
| Almost a Gentleman | Oswald Mitchell | Billy Bennett, Kathleen Harrison, Mervyn Johns | Comedy | |
| Almost a Honeymoon | Norman Lee | Tommy Trinder, Linden Travers, Edmund Breon | Comedy | |
| Anything to Declare? | Redd Davis | John Loder, Noel Madison, Belle Chrystall | Crime | |
| Around the Town | Herbert Smith | Vic Oliver, Irene Ware, Finlay Currie | Musical | |
| Bank Holiday | Carol Reed | Margaret Lockwood, Hugh Williams, John Lodge | Drama | |
| Bed and Breakfast | Walter West | Daphne Courtney, Barry Lupino, Mabel Poulton | Drama | |
| Bedtime Story | Donovan Pedelty | Jack Livesey, Lesley Wareing, Eliot Makeham | Comedy | |
| Blondes for Danger | Jack Raymond | Gordon Harker, Enid Stamp-Taylor, Ivan Brandt | Comedy thriller | |
| Break the News | René Clair | Jack Buchanan, Maurice Chevalier, Marta Labarr | Comedy | |
| Calling All Crooks | George Black | Douglas Wakefield, Billy Nelson, Leslie Perrins | Comedy | |
| The Challenge | Milton Rosmer | Robert Douglas, Frank Birch, Luis Trenker | Adventure | |
| Chinatown Nights | Toni Frenguelli | Harry Agar Lyons, Anne Grey, Nell Emerald | Sci-fi | |
| Chips | Edward Godal | Robb Wilton, Davy Burnaby, Joyce Bland | Musical | |
| The Citadel | King Vidor | Robert Donat, Rosalind Russell, Ralph Richardson | Drama | |
| The Claydon Treasure Mystery | Manning Haynes | John Stuart, Garry Marsh, Evelyn Ankers | Crime | |
| Climbing High | Carol Reed | Michael Redgrave, Jessie Matthews, Alastair Sim | Comedy | |
| Coming of Age | Manning Haynes | Eliot Makeham, Joyce Bland, Jack Melford | Comedy | |
| Convict 99 | Marcel Varnel | Will Hay, Moore Marriott, Googie Withers | Comedy | |
| Crackerjack | Albert de Courville | Tom Walls, Lilli Palmer, Noel Madison | Comedy crime | |
| The Dance of Death | Gerald Blake | Vesta Victoria, Stewart Rome, Julie Suedo | Crime | |
| Dangerous Medicine | Arthur B. Woods | Elizabeth Allan, Cyril Ritchard, Anthony Holles | Thriller | |
| The Dark Stairway | Arthur B. Woods | Hugh Williams, Chili Bouchier, Garry Marsh | Crime | |
| Darts Are Trumps | Maclean Rogers | Eliot Makeham, Nancy O'Neil, Ian Colin | Comedy | |
| Dead Men Tell No Tales | David MacDonald | Emlyn Williams, Sara Seegar, Hugh Williams | Thriller | |
| The Divorce of Lady X | Tim Whelan | Laurence Olivier, Merle Oberon, Binnie Barnes | Romantic comedy | |
| Double or Quits | Roy William Neill | Patricia Medina, Hal Walters, Ian Fleming | Crime | |
| The Drum | Zoltan Korda | Sabu, Raymond Massey, Valerie Hobson | Adventure | |
| Easy Riches | Maclean Rogers | George Carey, Gus McNaughton, Marjorie Taylor | Comedy | |
| Everything Happens to Me | Roy William Neill | Max Miller, Chili Bouchier, Norma Varden | Comedy | |
| Father O'Nine | Roy Kellino | Hal Gordon, Dorothy Dewhurst, Jimmy Godden | Comedy | |
| Follow Your Star | Sinclair Hill | Arthur Tracy, Belle Chrystall, Horace Hodges | Musical | |
| The Gables Mystery | Harry Hughes | Francis L. Sullivan, Antoinette Cellier, Leslie Perrins | Crime | |
| The Gaunt Stranger | Walter Forde | Sonnie Hale, Alexander Knox, Patricia Roc | Mystery | |
| Glamour Girl | Arthur B. Woods | Gene Gerrard, Lesley Brook, Betty Lynne | Comedy | |
| Hey! Hey! USA | Marcel Varnel | Will Hay, Edgar Kennedy, Fred Duprez | Comedy | |
| His Lordship Goes to Press | Maclean Rogers | June Clyde, Hugh Williams, Leslie Perrins | Comedy | |
| His Lordship Regrets | Maclean Rogers | Claude Hulbert, Winifred Shotter, Gina Malo | Comedy | |
| Hold My Hand | Thornton Freeland | Stanley Lupino, Sally Gray, Polly Ward | Musical | |
| Housemaster | Herbert Brenon | Otto Kruger, Diana Churchill, Phillips Holmes | Comedy | |
| I See Ice | Anthony Kimmins | George Formby, Kay Walsh, Garry Marsh | Comedy | |
| If I Were Boss | Maclean Rogers | Bruce Seton, Googie Withers, Julie Suedo | Drama | |
| Incident in Shanghai | John Paddy Carstairs | Margaret Vyner, Patrick Barr, John Deverell | Comedy | |
| Inspector Hornleigh | Eugene Forde | Gordon Harker, Alastair Sim, Hugh Williams | Comedy crime | |
| It's in the Air | Anthony Kimmins | George Formby, Polly Ward, Garry Marsh | Comedy | |
| It's in the Blood | Gene Gerrard | Claude Hulbert, Lesley Brook, James Stephenson | Comedy | |
| I've Got a Horse | Herbert Smith | Sandy Powell, Norah Howard, Evelyn Roberts | Comedy | |
| Jane Steps Out | Paul L. Stein | Diana Churchill, Jean Muir, Peter Murray-Hill | Comedy | |
| John Halifax | George King | John Warwick, Nancy Burne, Ralph Michael | Drama | |
| Kate Plus Ten | Reginald Denham | Jack Hulbert, Genevieve Tobin, Francis L. Sullivan | Thriller | |
| Keep Smiling | Monty Banks | Gracie Fields, Roger Livesey, Mary Maguire | Comedy | |
| Kicking the Moon Around | Walter Forde | Bert Ambrose, Evelyn Dall, Florence Desmond | Musical | |

== L–Z ==
| Title | Director | Cast | Genre | Notes |
|---|---|---|---|---|
| The Lady Vanishes | Alfred Hitchcock | Margaret Lockwood, Michael Redgrave, May Whitty | Mystery | Number 35 in the list of BFI Top 100 British films |
| Lassie from Lancashire | John Paddy Carstairs | Marjorie Browne, Mark Daly, Vera Lennox | Comedy | |
| The Last Barricade | Alex Bryce | Meinhart Maur, Greta Gynt, Hay Petrie | Romance | |
| Lightning Conductor | Maurice Elvey | Gordon Harker, Sally Gray, John Lodge | Comedy | |
| Lily of Laguna | Oswald Mitchell | Nora Swinburne, Richard Ainley, Jenny Laird | Drama | |
| Little Dolly Daydream | Oswald Mitchell | Binkie Stuart, Talbot O'Farrell, Jane Welsh | Musical | |
| The Londonderry Air | Alex Bryce | Sara Allgood, Liam Gaffney, Phyllis Ryan | Romance | |
| Luck of the Navy | Jack Raymond | Geoffrey Toone, Judy Kelly, Clifford Evans | Comedy | |
| Make It Three | David MacDonald | Hugh Wakefield, Edmund Willard, Diana Beaumont | Comedy | |
| Many Tanks Mr. Atkins | Roy William Neill | Claude Hulbert, Reginald Purdell, Davy Burnaby | Comedy | |
| Marigold | Thomas Bentley | Sophie Stewart, Patrick Barr, Edward Chapman | Drama | |
| Meet Mr. Penny | David MacDonald | Richard Goolden, Vic Oliver, Kay Walsh | Comedy | |
| Merely Mr. Hawkins | Maclean Rogers | Eliot Makeham, Dinah Sheridan, Max Adrian | Comedy | |
| Miracles Do Happen | Maclean Rogers | Jack Hobbs, Marjorie Taylor, George Carney | Comedy | |
| Mountains O'Mourne | Harry Hughes | René Ray, Niall MacGinnis, Betty Ann Davies | Musical comedy | |
| Mr. Reeder in Room 13 | Norman Lee | Peter Murray-Hill, Sally Gray, Gibb McLaughlin | Crime | |
| Mr. Satan | Arthur B. Woods | James Stephenson, Chili Bouchier, Betty Lynne | Thriller | |
| Murder Tomorrow | Donovan Pedelty | Gwenllian Gill, Jack Livesey, Raymond Lovell | Crime | |
| My Irish Molly | Alex Bryce | Binkie Stuart, Phillip Reed, Maureen O'Hara | Musical | |
| Night Alone | Thomas Bentley | Lesley Brook, Leonora Corbett, Lesley Brook | Comedy | |
| Night Journey | Oswald Mitchell | Geoffrey Toone, Patricia Hilliard, Alf Goddard | Crime | |
| No Parking | Jack Raymond | Gordon Harker, Irene Ware, Leslie Perrins | Comedy | |
| Oh Boy! | Albert de Courville | Albert Burdon, Mary Lawson, Bernard Nedell | Comedy | |
| Old Bones of the River | Marcel Varnel | Will Hay, Graham Moffatt, Moore Marriott | Comedy | |
| Old Iron | Tom Walls | Eva Moore, Cecil Parker, Veronica Rose | Comedy | |
| Old Mother Riley in Paris | Oswald Mitchell | Arthur Lucan, Kitty McShane, Magda Kun | Comedy | |
| On Velvet | Widgey R. Newman | Wally Patch, Vi Kaley, Julie Suedo | Comedy | |
| Owd Bob | Robert Stevenson | Will Fyffe, Margaret Lockwood, John Loder | Drama | |
| Paid in Error | Maclean Rogers | George Carney, Marjorie Taylor, Googie Withers | Comedy | |
| Penny Paradise | Carol Reed | Edmund Gwenn, Betty Driver, Jimmy O'Dea | Comedy | |
| Premiere | Walter Summers | John Lodge, Judy Kelly, Hugh Williams | Mystery | |
| Prison Without Bars | Brian Desmond Hurst | Corinne Luchaire, Edna Best, Barry K. Barnes | Drama | |
| Pygmalion | Anthony Asquith, Leslie Howard | Leslie Howard, Wendy Hiller, Wilfrid Lawson | Comedy | George Bernard Shaw's play |
| Queer Cargo | Harold D. Schuster | John Lodge, Judy Kelly, Louis Borel | Drama | |
| Quiet Please | Roy William Neill | Reginald Purdell, Lesley Brook, Julien Mitchell | Comedy | |
| The Rebel Son | Adrian Brunel, Albert de Courville, Alexis Granowsky | Harry Baur, Anthony Bushell, Patricia Roc | Historical | |
| The Return of Carol Deane | Arthur B. Woods | Bebe Daniels, Peter Coke, Arthur Margetson | Drama | |
| The Return of the Frog | Maurice Elvey | Gordon Harker, Hartley Power, Rene Ray | Crime | |
| Romance à la carte | Maclean Rogers | Leslie Perrins, Dorothy Boyd, Anthony Holles | Comedy | |
| A Royal Divorce | Jack Raymond | Ruth Chatterton, Pierre Blanchar, Carol Goodner | Drama | |
| Runaway Ladies | Jean de Limur | Betty Stockfeld, Roger Tréville, Hugh Wakefield | Comedy | |
| Sailing Along | Sonnie Hale | Jessie Matthews, Barry MacKay, Roland Young | Musical Comedy | |
| St. Martin's Lane | Tim Whelan | Charles Laughton, Vivien Leigh, Rex Harrison | Comedy Drama | |
| Save a Little Sunshine | Norman Lee | Patricia Kirkwood, Dave Willis, Tommy Trinder | Comedy | |
| Scruffy | Randall Faye | Jack Melford, Toni Edgar-Bruce, Billy Merson | Family | |
| Second Best Bed | Tom Walls | Tom Walls, Jane Baxter, Veronica Rose | Comedy | |
| Second Thoughts | Albert Parker | Evelyn Ankers, A. Bromley Davenport, Marjorie Fielding | Drama | |
| Sexton Blake and the Hooded Terror | George King | George Curzon, Tod Slaughter, Greta Gynt | Crime | |
| Silver Top | George King | Marie Wright, Betty Ann Davies, David Farrar | Crime | |
| Simply Terrific | Roy William Neill | Claude Hulbert, Patricia Medina, Reginald Purdell | Comedy | |
| The Singing Cop | Arthur B. Woods | Keith Falkner, Chili Bouchier, Marta Labarr | Comedy | |
| A Sister to Assist 'Er | George Dewhurst, Widgey R. Newman | Muriel George, Polly Emery, Charles Paton | Comedy | |
| Sixty Glorious Years | Herbert Wilcox | Anna Neagle, Anton Walbrook, C. Aubrey Smith | Historical | |
| The Sky's the Limit | Lee Garmes | Jack Buchanan, Mara Losseff, William Kendall | Musical comedy | |
| South Riding | Victor Saville | Edna Best, Ralph Richardson, Ann Todd | Drama | |
| Special Edition | Redd Davis | Lucille Lisle, John Garrick, Norman Pierce | Thriller | |
| A Spot of Bother | David MacDonald | Robertson Hare, Alfred Drayton, Sandra Storme | Comedy | |
| Star of the Circus | Albert de Courville | Otto Kruger, Gertrude Michael, John Clements | Drama | Remake of the 1937 German film Truxa |
| Stardust | Melville W. Brown | Ben Lyon, Lupe Vélez, Wallace Ford | Musical | |
| Stepping Toes | John Baxter | Hazel Ascot, Enid Stamp-Taylor, Richard Cooper | Musical | |
| Strange Boarders | Herbert Mason | Tom Walls, Renée Saint-Cyr, Googie Withers | Comedy thriller | |
| Sweet Devil | René Guissart | Bobby Howes, Jean Gillie, William Kendall | Comedy | |
| Tea Leaves in the Wind | Ward Wing | Nils Asther, Gibson Gowland, Cyril Chadwick | Drama | |
| The Terror | Richard Bird | Wilfrid Lawson, Bernard Lee, Linden Travers | Crime | |
| Thank Evans | Roy William Neill | Max Miller, Hal Walters, Polly Ward | Comedy | |
| They Drive by Night | Arthur B. Woods | Emlyn Williams, Ernest Thesiger, Anna Konstam | Thriller | |
| This Man Is News | David MacDonald | Barry K. Barnes, Valerie Hobson, Alastair Sim | Comedy thriller | |
| Thistledown | Arthur B. Woods | Aino Bergö, Keith Falkner, Athole Stewart | Musical | |
| Too Many Husbands | Ivar Campbell | Jack Melford, Geoffrey Sumner, Brian Oulton | Comedy | |
| Vessel of Wrath | Erich Pommer | Charles Laughton, Elsa Lanchester, Robert Newton | Drama | |
| The Villiers Diamond | Bernard Mainwaring | Evelyn Ankers, Edward Ashley, Julie Suedo | Crime | |
| The Viper | Roy William Neill | Claude Hulbert, Betty Lynne, Hal Walters | Comedy | |
| The Ware Case | Robert Stevenson | Clive Brook, Jane Baxter, Barry K. Barnes | Crime | |
| Weddings Are Wonderful | Maclean Rogers | June Clyde, Esmond Knight, Rene Ray | Comedy | |
| We're Going to Be Rich | Monty Banks | Gracie Fields, Victor McLaglen, Brian Donlevy | Comedy | |
| What a Man! | Edmond T. Gréville | Sydney Howard, Vera Pearce, Jenny Laird | Comedy | |
| Who Goes Next? | Maurice Elvey | Barry K. Barnes, Sophie Stewart, Jack Hawkins | War | |
| A Yank at Oxford | Jack Conway | Robert Taylor, Lionel Barrymore, Maureen O'Sullivan | Comedy | |
| Yellow Sands | Herbert Brenon | Marie Tempest, Belle Chrystall, Robert Newton | Comedy drama | |
| You're the Doctor | Roy Lockwood | Barry K. Barnes, Googie Withers, Norma Varden | Comedy | |

== Short films ==
| Title | Director | Cast | Genre | Notes |
|---|---|---|---|---|
| Devil's Rock | Germain Burger | Richard Hayward, Geraldine Mitchell | Musical | |
| Dial 999 | Lawrence Huntington | John Longden, Ian Fleming | Crime | |
| The Sky Raiders | Fraser Foulsham | Nita Harvey, Ambrose Day | Thriller | |
| Take Off That Hat | Eric Humphriss | Fred Duprez, C. Denier Warren | Comedy | |

== See also ==
- 1938 in British music
- 1938 in British television
- 1938 in the United Kingdom
