= 1938 in British music =

This is a summary of 1938 in music in the United Kingdom.

== Events ==
- June – at the International Society for Contemporary Music (ISCM) Festival in London Benjamin Britten meets Aaron Copland.
- 18 August – Benjamin Britten is the soloist at the first performance of his Piano Concerto, staged during the London Proms.
- date unknown – the composer Ralph Vaughan Williams begins an affair with Ursula Wood.

== Popular music ==
- "The Biggest Aspidistra In The World" by Tommie Connor, W. G. Haines & James S. Hancock
- "Boomps-A-Daisy", with words and music by Annette Mills
- "Cinderella, Stay In My Arms" w. Jimmy Kennedy m. Michael Carr
- "Dearest Love" w.m. Noël Coward
- "I Went to a Marvelous Party" w.m. Noël Coward
- "The Stately Homes Of England", with words and music by Noël Coward
- "Where Are The Songs We Sung?" w.m. Noël Coward
- "You're What's The Matter With Me" w.m. Jimmy Kennedy and Michael Carr. Introduced by Harry Richman and Evelyn Dall in the film Kicking the Moon Around.

== Classical music: new works ==
- Benjamin Britten – Piano Concerto, Op. 13 (original version)
- Alan Bush – Piano Concerto, Op. 18, with baritone and male choir in last movement
- Hamilton Harty – The Children of Lir
- Herbert Howells – Hymnus Paradisi
- Michael Tippett – Piano Sonata No. 1

== Film and Incidental music ==
- Louis Levy – Crackerjack, directed by Albert de Courville.
- Ernest Irving –
  - The High Command, starring Lionel Atwill, Lucie Mannheim and James Mason.
  - I See Ice, starring George Formby, Kay Walsh and Betty Stockfeld.
  - It's in the Air, starring George Formby, Polly Ward and Jack Hobbs. Directed by Anthony Kimmins.

== Musical theatre ==
- 26 January – The London production of Nine Sharp opens at The Little Theatre, to run for 405 performances.
- 16 March – The London production of Operette opens at His Majesty's Theatre after a short run in Manchester.
- 6 July – Maritza aka Countess Maritza, London production opened at the Palace Theatre
- 29 September – These Foolish Things London revue opened at the Palladium

== Musical films ==
- Around the Town, directed by Herbert Smith, starring Vic Oliver and Irene Ware.
- Break the News, directed by René Clair, starring Jack Buchanan and Maurice Chevalier.
- Kicking the Moon Around, directed by Walter Forde, starring Bert Ambrose and Evelyn Dall
- Mountains O'Mourne, directed by Harry Hughes, starring René Ray and Niall MacGinnis.
- My Irish Molly, directed by Alex Bryce, starring Binkie Stuart
- Over She Goes, directed by Graham Cutts, starring Stanley Lupino and Claire Luce
- Sailing Along, directed by Sonnie Hale, starring Jessie Matthews and Barry MacKay
- Stepping Toes, directed by John Baxter, starring Hazel Ascot and Enid Stamp-Taylor
- Thistledown, directed by Arthur B. Woods, starring Aino Bergö and Athole Stewart
- We're Going to Be Rich starring Gracie Fields, Victor McLaglen and Brian Donlevy

== Births ==
- 18 March – Kenny Lynch, singer, songwriter and actor (died 2019)
- 31 March – Laurie Holloway, pianist and composer
- 27 May – Elizabeth Harwood, operatic soprano (died 1990)
- 1 July – Susan Maughan, singer
- 26 August – Jet Black (The Stranglers)
- 20 September – Jane Manning, operatic soprano
- 5 October – Peter Aston, conductor and composer (died 2013)
- 28 October – Howard Blake, composer
- 31 December – Christopher Steel, composer (died 1991)

== Deaths ==
- 1 February – Marie Dainton, actress and music hall performer, 56
- 9 March – Sydney Baynes, conductor, composer and bandleader, 59
- 18 March – Cyril Rootham, organist and composer, 62
- 18 April – Richard Runciman Terry, musicologist, 72
- 24 July – Marmaduke Barton, pianist and composer, 72
- 14 August – Sir Landon Ronald, conductor and composer, 65
- 3 September – James Kendrick Pyne, organist and composer, 86
- 4 November – John Thomas Job, minister, hymn-writer and poet, 71
- 15 November – Viola Tree, actress, singer and playwright, 54 (pleurisy)

== See also ==
- 1938 in British television
- 1938 in the United Kingdom
- List of British films of 1938
