= 1938 in British television =

This is a list of events related to British television in 1938.

== Events ==
=== February ===
- 21 February – The BBC Television Service broadcasts the first ever piece of television science-fiction, a 35-minute adaptation of a segment of the play R.U.R. by the Czech playwright Karel Čapek.

=== March ===
- 12 March – First news bulletin carried by the BBC Television Service, in sound only. Previously, the service had aired British Movietone News cinema newsreels.

=== April ===
- 1 April – The Oxford and Cambridge Boat Race is first televised on the BBC Television Service.
- 19 April – The first televised international football (soccer) match, England v Scotland, shown on the BBC Television Service.
- 30 April – The FA Cup Final is televised for the first time on the BBC Television Service.

=== May ===
- 31 May – The first quiz show, Spelling Bee, is televised on the BBC Television Service.

=== June ===
- 24 June
  - Test Match Cricket is broadcast for the first time on the BBC Television Service, with coverage of the second test of The Ashes series between England and Australia, live from Lord's Cricket Ground.
  - John Logie Baird gives the world's first public demonstration of a colour television broadcast. The 120-line image is projected at the Dominion Theatre, London on a 12 by 9 feet (3.7 by 2.7 m) screen in front of an audience of 3,000.

=== October ===
- 26 October – The first televised ice hockey match, Harringay Racers vs. Streatham Redskins, is shown by the BBC.

=== November ===
- Due to freak atmospheric conditions, a BBC TV broadcast from London is received in New York City.

=== December ===
- By the end of the year 9,315 television sets have been sold in England.

== Debuts ==
- 11 February – R.U.R (1938)
- 19 February – Clive of India (1938)
- 1 April – The Boat Race (1938–1939, 1946–2019)
- 8 May – Checkmate (1938)
- 11 May – The Emperor Jones (1938)
- 31 May – The Constant Nymph (1938)
- 10 August – Telecrime (1938–1939, 1946)
- 31 May – Spelling Bee (1938)
- July – Ann and Harold (1938)
- 2 July – On the Spot (1938)
- 5 July – White Secrets (1939)
- 12 July – The Case of the Frightened Lady (1938)
- 30 October – Cyrano de Bergerac (1938)
- 31 October – Smoky Cell (1938)
- 1 November – The Last Voyage of Captain Grant (1938)
- 7 November – The Breadwinner (1938)
- 10 November – Villa For Sale (1938)
- 11 November – The White Chateau (1938)
- 23 November – Love from a Stranger (1938)

== Continuing television shows ==
=== 1920s ===
- BBC Wimbledon (1927–1939, 1946–2019, 2021–2024)

=== 1930s ===
- Picture Page (1936–1939, 1946–1952)
- The Disorderly Room (1937–1939)
- For the Children (1937–1939, 1946–1952)

== Ending this year ==
- Ann and Harold (1938)

== Births ==
- 14 March – Eleanor Bron, actress and author
- 6 April – Paul Daniels, magician and television performer (d. 2016)
- 20 April – Peter Snow, radio and television presenter
- 28 April – Fred Dibnah, steeplejack and television personality (d. 2004)
- 7 June – Ian St John, Scottish footballer and TV pundit (d. 2021)
- 6 July – Tony Lewis, Welsh cricketer and sports presenter
- 20 July – Diana Rigg, actress (d. 2020)
- 22 July – Terence Stamp, actor
- 28 July – Ian McCaskill, weatherman (d. 2016)
- 3 August – Terry Wogan, Irish broadcaster (d. 2016)
- 31 August – Martin Bell, war correspondent, independent politician and UNICEF ambassador
- 12 September
  - Michael Leader, actor (d. 2016)
  - Patrick Mower, actor
- 22 October – Derek Jacobi, actor
- 28 October – David Dimbleby, political broadcaster

== See also ==
- 1938 in British music
- 1938 in the United Kingdom
- List of British films of 1938
