= Game show host =

Host of a radio or television game show

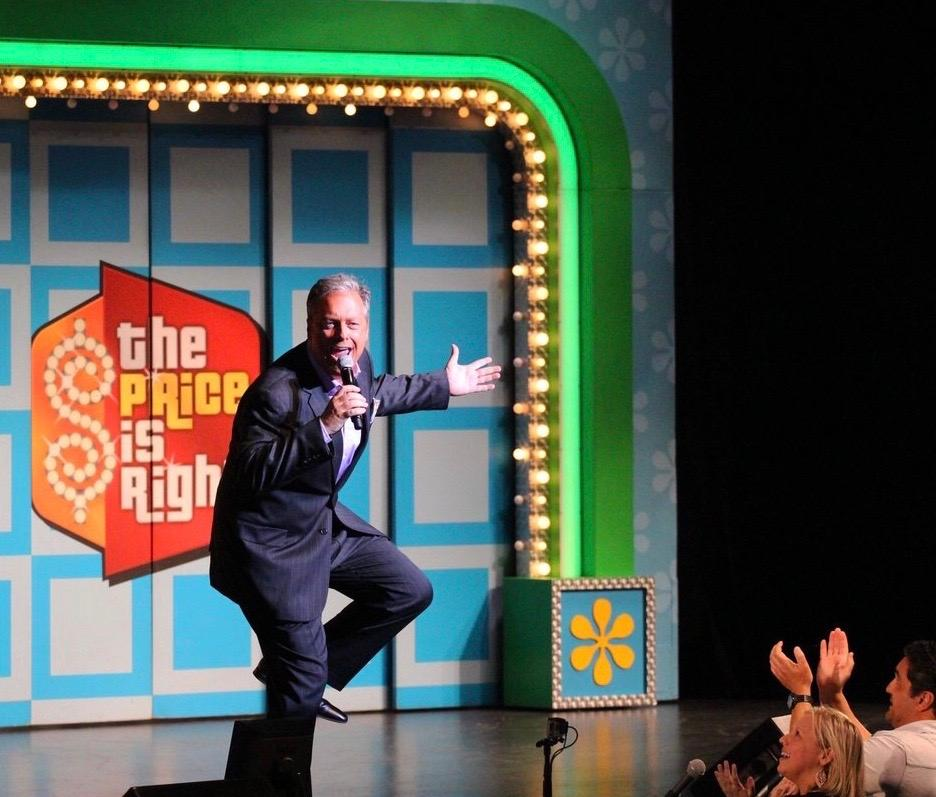
Todd Newton hosting American game show The Price Is Right

A game show host is an individual who manages a game show, introduces contestants, and asks quiz questions to test the knowledge of said contestants. They may also have other duties pertinent to production.

== History ==
In 1938, Freddie Grisewood was the first game show host. He directed Spelling Bee, a fifteen-minute show that was broadcast in the United Kingdom over radio and television.

== Characteristics ==
Especially in the United States, game show hosts have generally been conservative or libertarian in their political beliefs. Reasons for this include many of the hosts' rural origins (early television personalities were expected to have natural General American English accents, which were most prominent in the Midwest) and the merit-based nature of the game show format.

Wink Martindale said of successful game show hosts in a 2017 interview: “A good host is a person who loves people. If you’re a people person, you’re naturally going to be attracted to contestants, and it’s easy for you to be able to interact with those people.”

== World records ==
In June 2014, Alex Trebek set a new world record for "hosting more episodes of a single television game show than anyone else in TV history". Bob Barker previously held this record. In 2019, Pat Sajak became the longest-running host of any game show, defeating Barker’s previous record of 35 years hosting The Price Is Right.

American host Bill Cullen hosted more unique game show formats than any other person, with over 20 to his credit; Martindale, with 20, hosted the second-most.

== See also ==
- List of game show hosts
