= 1938 in the United Kingdom =

Events from the year 1938 in the United Kingdom.

== Incumbents ==
- Monarch – George VI
- Prime Minister – Neville Chamberlain (Coalition)

== Events ==
- 1 January – Sir Alexander Cadogan succeeds Sir Robert Vansittart as permanent under-secretary at the Foreign Office.
- 17 January – Joseph P. Kennedy Sr., is appointed United States Ambassador to the United Kingdom.
- 14 February – The British naval base at Singapore begins operations.
- 20 February – Anthony Eden resigns as Foreign Secretary over the foreign policy of the Chamberlain ministry towards Fascist Italy. Lord Halifax takes over.
- 14 March – Chamberlain makes a speech in the House of Commons saying the government "emphatically" disapproves of the Nazi German Anschluss in Austria two days previously but that "nothing could have prevented this action by Germany unless we and others with us had been prepared to use force to prevent it."
- 16 April – Anglo-Italian Treaty: Britain recognises Italian government over Ethiopia, in return for Italian troops withdrawing from Spain.
- 23 April – York Castle Museum opened.
- 25 April – Anglo-Irish Trade Agreement with the Republic of Ireland settles the Anglo-Irish Trade War and agrees to the Royal Navy abandoning the British sovereign bases at the Treaty ports in Ireland.
- 3 May – Empire Exhibition opens in Glasgow.
- 10 May – An underground explosion at Markham Colliery, near Staveley, Derbyshire, kills 79.
- 1 June – The Bren light machine gun comes into service with the British Army.
- 2 June – The children's zoo at London Zoo is opened by Robert and Ted Kennedy, two of the sons of United States ambassador Joseph P. Kennedy.
- 18 June – Women's Voluntary Service founded to assist the Civil Defence Service.
- 24 June – Test cricket is televised for the first time.
- 3 July – The London and North Eastern Railway's streamlined Class A4 4468 Mallard reaches a speed of 126 mph (203 km/h), the highest certified speed for a steam locomotive.
- 9 July – Gas masks are issued to the civilian population.
- 11 July–3 October – Military installations at the Treaty Ports in the Republic of Ireland (Berehaven, Spike Island at Queenstown, and Lough Swilly) are handed over from British control to the Government of Ireland, under terms of the Anglo-Irish Trade Agreement ratified by the Eire (Confirmation of Agreements) Act earlier in the year.
- 22 July – Britain rejects a proposal from its ambassador in Berlin, Nevile Henderson, for a four power summit on Czechoslovakia consisting of Britain, France, Germany and the U.S.S.R. as London will under no circumstances accept the Soviet Union as a diplomatic partner.
- 29 July – Holidays with Pay Act provides for paid annual leave in wage-regulated industries and for similar voluntary schemes in other employment.
- 30 July – The Beano comic first goes on sale, featuring the character Lord Snooty.
- August – Muslims protest in London about passages they consider disrespectful of their religion in H. G. Wells' A Short History of the World (1922).
- 3 August – Lord Runciman, sent by Neville Chamberlain, arrives in Prague on his mission of mediation in the Sudetenland dispute.
- 4 August – Major thunderstorm over Devon.
- 13–20 August – Great Britain and the United States contest the inaugural Amateur World Series in baseball, played in the north of England. Britain wins every match.
- 18 August – Ewald von Kleist-Schmenzin arrives in London looking for British support for an anti-Nazi putsch, using the looming crisis over the Sudetenland as a pretext. His private mission is dismissed by Neville Chamberlain as unimportant (Chamberlain refers to von Kleist as a "Jacobite"), but he finds a sympathetic if powerless audience in Winston Churchill.
- 23 August – English cricketer Len Hutton scores a record Test score of 364 runs in a match against Australia.
- 28 August – Lord Runciman's mission to mitigate the Sudetenland crisis begins to break down. Prime Minister Neville Chamberlain recalls Ambassador Nevile Henderson from Berlin to instruct Henderson to set up a personal meeting between Chamberlain and Adolf Hitler.
- 31 August – Winston Churchill, still believing France and Britain mean to honour their promises to defend Czechoslovakia against Nazi aggression, suggests in a personal note to Neville Chamberlain that His Majesty's Government may want to set up a broad international alliance, including the United States (specifically mentioning U.S. President Franklin D. Roosevelt as possibly receptive to the idea) and the Soviet Union.
- 7 September – The Times publishes a lead article which calls on Czechoslovakia to cede the Sudetenland to Germany.
- 9 September – Auxiliary Territorial Service, as a women's voluntary service, established.
- 15 September – Prime Minister Neville Chamberlain meets German Chancellor Adolf Hitler in Berchtesgaden in an attempt to negotiate an end to German expansionist policies.
- 21 September – Representatives of the British and French governments call on Czechoslovak President Edvard Beneš to tell him Britain and France will not fight Hitler if he decides to annex the Sudetenland by force. At home, Winston Churchill warns of grave consequences to European security if Czechoslovakia is partitioned.
- 25 September – The Royal Navy ordered to sea.
- 27 September – RMS Queen Elizabeth is launched at Clydebank; she is the largest ship in the world at this time.
- 29 September – Chamberlain signs the Munich Agreement and a resolution with Germany determining to resolve all future disputes between the two countries through peaceful means.
- 30 September – Neville Chamberlain returns to the UK from Munich, at Heston Aerodrome memorably waving the resolution signed the day earlier with Germany, and later in Downing Street giving his famous Peace for our time speech. George VI and Queen Elizabeth appear with Chamberlain on the balcony of Buckingham Palace to celebrate the agreement, a key moment in the European foreign policy of the Chamberlain ministry.
- 1 October – Picture Post magazine first published.
- 29 October – City Hall, Norwich, designed in the Art Deco style by C. H. James and S. R. Pierce, is opened.
- 4 November – At a public meeting in his parliamentary constituency of Epping, Winston Churchill narrowly survives an attempt by fellow Conservative and constituent Sir Colin Thornton-Kemsley to remove him from Parliament.
- 16 November – First reported "attack" of the Halifax Slasher mass hysteria incident.
- 20 November – Queen consort Maud of Norway (aunt of the King) dies in a nursing home in London aged 68.
- 21 November – Apostolic Delegation to Great Britain appointed.
- 1–2 December – First Kindertransport from Berlin to London Liverpool Street station via Harwich.
- 16 December – Aircraft carrier HMS Ark Royal (91) (launched by Cammell Laird in Birkenhead in 1937 under the 1934 build plan) is commissioned into the Royal Navy.

=== Undated ===
- J. Arthur Rank purchases a share in Odeon Cinemas.
- First green belts begin to be established in the UK, around Sheffield and London, the latter under terms of the Green Belt (London and Home Counties) Act.
- Little ringed plover first breeds in England.

== Publications ==
- Elizabeth Bowen's novel The Death of the Heart.
- Agatha Christie's Hercule Poirot novels Appointment with Death and Hercule Poirot's Christmas.
- Daphne du Maurier's novel Rebecca.
- Walter Ian Reid Fraser's textbook An Outline of Constitutional Law.
- Graham Greene's novel Brighton Rock.
- Kathleen Hale's children's book Orlando (The Marmalade Cat): A Camping Holiday, first in the series featuring the eponymous character.
- C. S. Lewis' science fiction novel Out of the Silent Planet.
- George Orwell's memoir Homage to Catalonia.
- Evelyn Waugh's satirical novel Scoop.
- T. H. White's novel The Sword in the Stone, first in the multi-volume The Once and Future King.
- P. G. Wodehouse's comic novel The Code of the Woosters.

== Births ==
- 1 January – Robert Jankel, businessman, founder of carmaker Panther (died 2005)
- 2 January
  - David Bailey, photographer
  - Ian Brady, serial killer (died 2017)
- 3 January – Robin Butler, Baron Butler of Brockwell, civil servant
- 6 January – Michael Graham Cox, actor (died 1995)
- 11 January
  - Alastair Morton, railway executive (died 2004)
  - Arthur Scargill, trade union leader
- 20 January
  - Liz Calder, publisher and editor
  - Derek Dougan, footballer (died 2007)
  - Bob Friend, newscaster (died 2008)
- 21 January – Nicholas Phillips, Baron Phillips of Worth Matravers, English lawyer and judge, Lord Chief Justice of England and Wales
- 26 January – Henry Jaglom, English-born director
- 3 February – Geoff Clayton, English cricketer (died 2018)
- 7 February – Andrea Newman, writer (died 2019)
- 8 February – Margo McLennan, actress (died 2004)
- 13 February – Oliver Reed, actor (died 1999)
- 17 February – Yvonne Romain, actress
- 26 February – Brian Kilby, marathon runner
- 27 February – Jake Thackray, singer-songwriter (died 2002)
- 28 February – John Bulmer, documentary photographer and filmmaker
- 6 March – Pauline Boty, pop art painter (died 1966)
- 14 March – Eleanor Bron, actress and author
- 18 March – Kenny Lynch, entertainer (died 2019)
- 24 March – Ian Hamilton, poet and critic (died 2001)
- 31 March – David Steel, Baron Steel of Aikwood, politician.
- 6 April – Paul Daniels, magician (died 2016)
- 19 April – Hugh Pennington, bacteriologist
- 22 April
  - Alan Bond, English-born Australian businessman (died 2015)
  - Adam Raphael, English journalist and editor
- 28 April – Fred Dibnah, steeplejack and television personality (died 2004)
- 3 May – Lindsay Kemp, dance and mime artist (died 2018)
- 9 May – Geoffrey Holland, English civil servant and academic (died 2017)
- 11 May – Bob Scott, ornithologist (died 2009)
- 12 May – Terry Farrell, architect (died 2025)
- 19 May – Herbie Flowers, musician (died 2024)
- 23 May – Peter Preston, newspaper editor (died 2018)
- 25 May – Margaret Forster, writer (died 2016)
- 26 May
  - May Blood, Baroness Blood, politician (died 2022)
  - Andrew Clennel Palmer, engineer (died 2019)
- 27 May – Elizabeth Harwood, operatic soprano (died 1990)
- 31 May – John Prescott, Welsh-born Deputy Prime Minister (died 2024)
- 2 June – Helen Oxenbury, illustrator and children's book writer
- 5 June – Allan Ahlberg, children's book writer (died 2025)
- 7 June
  - Graham Percy, illustrator (born in New Zealand; died 2008)
  - Ian St John, Scottish footballer (died 2021)
- 14 June – Angela Browne, actress (died 2001)
- 18 June – Michael Sheard, actor (died 2005)
- 21 June – Don Black, lyricist
- 25 June – Jim Feast, chemical scientist
- 26 June – Ted Wragg, professor of education (died 2005)
- 27 June
  - Kathryn Beaumont, English actress
  - Alan Coren, writer and broadcaster (died 2007)
  - David Hope, Baron Hope of Craighead, judge
- 28 June – Simon Douglas-Pennant, 7th Baron Penrhyn
- 29 June – Peter Wollen, film theorist and filmmaker (died 2019)
- 30 June – Mike Hellawell, footballer (died 2023)
- 1 July – Susan Maughan, singer
- 2 July – David Owen, politician
- 3 July – Ron Fogg, footballer (died 2020)
- 5 July – James Bond, motorcycle speedway rider
- 6 July
  - Tony Lewis, cricketer
  - Stuart Young, cricketer
- 8 July – John Ridgway, sailor
- 9 July – Faanya Rose, British-American businesswoman, conservationist, philanthropist and explorer
- 10 July – Hugh Mellor, philosopher (died 2020)
- 11 July – Brian Scarlett, physicist (died 2004)
- 15 July – Josephine Cox, novelist (died 2020)
- 16 July – Tony Jackson, singer and bass guitarist (died 2003)
- 18 July – Ian Stewart, Scottish rock keyboardist (The Rolling Stones) (died 1985)
- 19 July – Nicholas Bethell, 4th Baron Bethell, historian and human rights campaigner (died 2007)
- 20 July
  - Roger Hunt, footballer (died 2021)
  - David Pratt, cricketer
  - Diana Rigg, actress (died 2020)
- 22 July – Terence Stamp, actor (died 2025)
- 27 July – Peter Ucko, archaeologist (died 2007)
- 28 July – Ian McCaskill, weather forecaster (died 2016)
- 29 July
  - Christopher Gibbs, antiques dealer (died 2018)
  - Tom Raworth, poet (died 2017)
- 30 July – Terry O'Neill, photographer (died 2019)
- 4 August – Simon Preston, organist (died 2022)
- 6 August – Rees Davies, historian (died 2005)
- 21 August – Peter Dale, poet and translator (died 2024)
- 25 August – Frederick Forsyth, thriller writer (died 2025)
- 30 August – Alf Meakin, track and field athlete
- 31 August – Martin Bell, journalist and independent politician
- 3 September – Richard MacCormac, architect (died 2014)
- 10 September – David Hamilton, radio and TV personality
- 12 September
  - Michael Leader, actor (died 2016)
  - Patrick Mower, actor
- 13 September
  - Angus Douglas-Hamilton, 15th Duke of Hamilton and 12th Duke of Brandon, Scottish peer (died 2010)
  - John Smith, Scottish politician, leader of the Labour Party (died 1994)
- 16 September – Eddie George, financier and Governor of the Bank of England (died 2009)
- 20 September – Jane Manning, opera and concert singer (died 2021)
- 25 September – Ron Hill, distance runner and sports clothing entrepreneur (died 2021)
- 27 September – Arthur Metcalfe, racing cyclist (died 2002)
- 28 September – Tina Packer, actress and stage director (died 2026)
- 30 September – Alan Hacker, musician (died 2012)
- 9 October
  - Denzil Davies, Welsh politician (died 2018)
  - Angus Montagu, 12th Duke of Manchester, English peer (died 2002)
  - John Sutherland, writer and academic
- 13 October – Hugo Young, journalist (died 2003)
- 14 October – Elizabeth Esteve-Coll, museum director and academic administrator (died 2024)
- 20 October – Iain MacMillan, photographer (died 2006)
- 22 October – Derek Jacobi, actor
- 24 October – Michael Graydon, air marshal
- 28 October
  - David Dimbleby, broadcaster
  - Anne Perry, born Juliet Marion Hulme, detective novelist and murderer (died 2023)
- 1 November – Malcolm Laycock, radio presenter and producer (died 2009)
- 12 November
  - Terry McDonald, footballer and coach
  - Richard May, judge (died 2004)
- 15 November – John MacKay, Baron MacKay of Ardbrecknish, politician (died 2001)
- 17 November – Charles Guthrie, Baron Guthrie of Craigiebank, field marshal
- 4 December – Richard Meade, equestrian (died 2015)
- 9 December – Robin Popplestone, computer scientist (died 2004)
- 10 December – Brian Jones, poet (died 2009)
- 12 December – Felicity Ann d'Abreu, film producer
- 15 December – Michael Bogdanov, theatre director (died 2017)
- 17 December – Carlo Little, drummer (died 2005)
- 21 December – John Quayle, actor
- 22 December – Brian Locking, bassist (The Shadows)

== Deaths ==
- 13 March – Frederick George Jackson, Arctic explorer (born 1860)
- 9 April
  - Archibald Kennedy, 3rd Marquess of Ailsa, aristocrat (born 1847)
  - Sir Thomas Callender, engineer and businessman (born 1855)
- 16 April
  - Steve Bloomer, footballer and manager (born 1874)
  - Bertram Mills, circus manager (born 1873)
- 16 May – Sir Lewis Bayly, admiral (born 1857)
- 9 June – John Broadbent, army officer and politician (born 1872)
- 23 June
  - Clement Edwards, lawyer, journalist and activist (born 1869)
  - William Gillespie, actor (born 1894)
- 4 July – Sir Archibald Berkeley Milne, admiral (born 1855)
- 16 July – Samuel Insull, British-born American businessman (born 1859)
- 18 July – Marie of Edinburgh, Queen consort of Ferdinand I of Romania, granddaughter of Queen Victoria (born 1875)
- 12 September – Prince Arthur of Connaught, grandson of Queen Victoria (born 1883)
- 3 October – Olivia Shakespear, novelist, playwright, and patron of the arts (born 1863)
- 24 October – Gilbert Greenall, 1st Baron Daresbury, businessman (born 1867)
- 27 October – Lascelles Abercrombie, poet and critic (born 1881)
- 16 November – James Barr, physician (born 1849)
- 20 November – Maud of Wales, Queen consort of Haakon VII of Norway and last surviving child of King Edward VII (born 1869)
- 24 December – William Mitchell-Thomson, 1st Baron Selsdon, politician (born 1877)

== See also ==
- List of British films of 1938
