= Annie Laurie (1936 film) =

1936 British film by Walter Tennyson

- Directed by: Walter Tennyson
- Written by: Frank Miller
- Produced by: Wilfred Noy; Walter Tennyson
- Starring: Will Fyffe; Polly Ward; Bruce Seton; Vivienne Chatterton
- Cinematography: Jack Parker
- Edited by: William Hamilton
- Music by: Horace Sheldon
- Production company: Mondover
- Distributed by: Butcher's Film Service
- Release date: 1936
- Running time: 82 minutes
- Country: United Kingdom
- Language: English

Annie Laurie is a 1936 British comedy film directed by Walter Tennyson and starring Will Fyffe, Polly Ward and Bruce Seton. The film takes its name from, but is not based on, the traditional Scottish song Annie Laurie. It was made at Cricklewood Studios in London.

== Cast ==
- Will Fyffe as Will Laurie
- Polly Ward as Annie Laurie
- Bruce Seton as Jamie Turner
- Vivienne Chatterton as Maggie Laurie
- Romilly Lunge as John Anderson
- Percy Walsh as Alec Laurie
- Frederick Culley as Robert Anderson
- Evelyn Barnard as Elspeth McAlpine
- Quentin McPhearson as Small

== Bibliography ==
- Low, Rachael. Filmmaking in 1930s Britain. George Allen & Unwin, 1985.
- Wood, Linda. British Films, 1927-1939. British Film Institute, 1986
