= Bullets for O'Hara =

1941 film by William K. Howard

- Theatrical release poster
- Directed by: William K. Howard
- Screenplay by: Raymond L. Schrock
- Story by: P.J. Wolfson
- Produced by: Bryan Foy
- Starring: Joan Perry; Roger Pryor; Anthony Quinn; Maris Wrixon; Dick Purcell; Richard Ainley
- Cinematography: Ted D. McCord
- Edited by: James Gibbon
- Music by: Bernhard Kaun
- Production company: Warner Bros. Pictures
- Distributed by: Warner Bros. Pictures
- Release date: July 19, 1941
- Running time: 50 minutes
- Country: United States
- Language: English

Bullets for O'Hara is a 1941 American crime drama film directed by William K. Howard, written by Raymond L. Schrock, and starring Joan Perry, Roger Pryor, Anthony Quinn, Maris Wrixon, Dick Purcell and Richard Ainley. It was released by Warner Bros. Pictures on July 19, 1941.

== Plot ==
Offered the home of her well-to-do friends the Standishes for her Florida honeymoon, newlywed Patricia Van Dyne is astonished when her husband Tony promptly robs the place. Tony forces her to go along on a train bound for Chicago, then abandons Pat before the waiting police led by Mike O'Hara can nab him.

O'Hara arrests her, skeptical of Pat's claim that she had nothing to do with the theft. Once she is cleared of the charges, Pat immediately seeks a divorce from Tony. A scheme is hatched, Mike pretending to marry Pat himself to lure Tony out of hiding. Tony lets them go through with the wedding, then snatches Pat and Mike and takes them to the Florida Keys.

Pat is able to have a note delivered to the police, who come to her rescue. Mike apologizes for the confusion and says he will quickly grant her a divorce. Pat says that will not be necessary.

== Cast ==
- Joan Perry as Patricia Van Dyne
- Roger Pryor as Mike O'Hara
- Anthony Quinn as Tony Van Dyne
- Maris Wrixon as Elaine Standish
- Dick Purcell as Wicks
- Richard Ainley as McKay Standish
- Hobart Bosworth as Judge
- William Hopper as Richard Palmer
- Joan Winfield as Marjorie Palmer
- Roland Drew as Bradford
- Joe King as Maxwell
- Victor Zimmerman as Steve
- Hank Mann as Swartzman
- Kenneth Harlan as Jim
- Frank Mayo as Weldon
- Jack Mower as G-Man
- Sidney Bracey as Lamson
- Leah Baird as Police Matron
