= Smithy (1933 film) =

- Directed by: George King
- Produced by: Irving Asher
- Starring: Edmund Gwenn; Peggy Novak; D. A. Clarke-Smith
- Cinematography: Basil Emmott
- Production company: Warner Brothers
- Distributed by: Warner Brothers
- Release date: October 1933
- Running time: 53 minutes
- Country: United Kingdom
- Language: English

Smithy (also known as The Man with a Million) is a 1933 British comedy drama film directed by George King and starring Edmund Gwenn, Peggy Novak and D. A. Clarke-Smith. It was made as a quota quickie by the British subsidiary of Warner Brothers at their Teddington Studios.

== Preservation status ==
The British Film Institute National Archive holds a collection of stills but no film or video materials.

== Plot ==
Stockbroker's clerk John Smith is a dreamer and crossword puzzle enthusiast. Interested in a correspondence course on success being mind over matter, he arranges for the representative to visit his office, who persuades him that all he needs to earn £10,000 a year is confidence. When his colleagues overhear the conversation they mistakenly get the idea that he has inherited that much money a year, and take him out to celebrate. At a night club he meets a cabaret singer and tells her the true story of his non-existent fortune. Next morning he finds his wife waiting at his office, and has to admit that they are as hard up as ever. Then, a letter arrives – he is the winner of a £2,000 crossword competition. With renewed confidence, he goes to meet the nightlcub singer again.

== Cast ==
- Edmund Gwenn as John Smith
- Peggy Novak as Jane
- D. A. Clarke-Smith as Boyd
- Eve Gray as daughter
- Clifford Heatherley as Sir Olds
- Viola Compton as Lucy
- Charles Hickman as son
- Charles Hawtrey

== Reception ==
Kine Weekly wrote: "The plot is put over in an entertaining manner by a well-selected cast, and the many amusing situations are competently handled by George King. ... Bright story, amusing situations, good performance by star and support."

The Daily Film Renter wrote: "With some really good dialogue this might have made quite an amusing picture, but it lacks snap. Edmund Gwenn, however, as the dreamer, acts competently, but is apt to overdo his part at times. Peggy Novak, in the comparatively small part of the cabaret singer, does well, and the remainder of the cast offer reasonable support."

Picture Show wrote: "Competently acted, straightforwardly directed."
