= Trouble in Store (1934 film) =

- Directed by: Clyde Cook
- Produced by: Irving Asher
- Starring: James Finlayson; Jack Hobbs; Clifford Heatherley
- Cinematography: Basil Emmott
- Production company: Warner Bros.
- Distributed by: Warner Bros.
- Release date: 21 May 1934
- Running time: 39 minutes
- Country: United Kingdom
- Language: English

Trouble in Store is a 1934 British comedy film directed by Clyde Cook and starring James Finlayson, Jack Hobbs and Clifford Heatherley. It was produced by Irving Asher and made by Warner Bros. as a quota quickie at the company's Teddington Studios. It was the debut screen performance of Joan Hickson.

== Preservation status ==
The British Film Institute National Archive holds a collection of stills but no film or video materials.

== Premise ==
Comedy and action ensue when a group of store assistants, who are accidentally shut in overnight, spy a break-in and try to apprehend the thieves.

== Cast ==
- James Finlayson as the watchman
- Jack Hobbs as Jack
- Anthony Hankey as Tony
- Clifford Heatherley as Potts
- Margaret Yarde as landlady
- Charles Carson as Sanderson
- Millicent Wolf as Venese
- Joan Hickson as Mabel
- Charles Hawtrey

== Reception ==
The Daily Film Renter wrote: "Naive comedy of two shop assistants ... Development follows conventional lines, suspense values moderate, with adequate portrayals by leading players. Satisfactory direction, while settings, mostly of the interior of the store, are convincing. Second feature for popular patrons."

Picture Show wrote: "Unpretentious comedy with very little story, aged jokes, and trite dialogue."
