= A Little Bit of Bluff =

- Directed by: Maclean Rogers
- Written by: Kathleen Butler; H.F. Maltby
- Produced by: A. George Smith
- Starring: Reginald Gardiner; Marjorie Shotter; H. F. Maltby; Margaret Watson
- Release date: March 1935 (UK)
- Running time: 61 minutes
- Country: United Kingdom
- Language: English

A Little Bit of Bluff is a 1935 British comedy film directed by Maclean Rogers and starring Reginald Gardiner, Marjorie Shotter and Clifford Heatherley. It was written by Kathleen Butler and H.F. Maltby, and was made as a quota quickie.

== Plot ==
Admiral Simcox gives a valuable emerald to his absent-minded wife, who loses it. Her daughter Joyce persuades her boyfriend Hugh Rigby to pose as a detective, to recover the gem.

== Cast ==
- Reginald Gardiner as Hugh Rigby
- Marjorie Shotter as Joyce Simcox
- H. F. Maltby as Admiral Simcox
- Margaret Watson as Mrs. Simcox
- Clifford Heatherley as the butler
- Clifford McLaglen
- Molly Fisher
- Peggy Novak

== Reception ==
Kine Weekly wrote: "A succession of farcical and highly-diverting adventures."

The Daily Film Renter wrote: "Most of the comedy is supplied by Clifford Heatherley, who plays a pompous butler with his usual skill, while Reginald Gardiner essays Rigby somewhat in the style of a musical comedy juvenile. Marjorie Shotter is an acceptable heroine, with, H.F. Maltby as peppery an Admiral as ever trod the quarterdeck."
