= Keep Your Seats, Please =

1936 British film by Monty Banks

- Directed by: Monty Banks
- Written by: Ilya Ilf (novel); Yevgeny Petrov (novel); Anthony Kimmins; Thomas J. Geraghty; Ian Hay
- Produced by: Basil Dean
- Starring: George Formby; Florence Desmond; Alastair Sim; Gus McNaughton; Binkie Stuart
- Cinematography: John W. Boyle
- Edited by: Jack Kitchin
- Music by: Ernest Irving
- Production company: Associated Talking Pictures
- Distributed by: ABFD
- Release date: 1 August 1936
- Running time: 82 minutes
- Country: United Kingdom
- Language: English

Keep Your Seats, Please is a 1936 British comedy film directed by Monty Banks and starring George Formby, Florence Desmond and Alastair Sim. It marked the film debut of the child star Binkie Stuart. The film was made by Associated Talking Pictures.

The film, which features Formby's most famous tune, "When I'm Cleaning Windows", follows a farcical plot based on the 1928 Russian satirical novel The Twelve Chairs by Ilya Ilf and Yevgeni Petrov.

== Plot ==
George Withers learns he is supposed to inherit some valuable jewels from his aunt, and enlists the aid of his dubious lawyer to ensure he gets them. It transpires the stones are hidden in the lining of one of six antique chairs, and his aunt has left instructions for her nephew to purchase the chairs at auction. But unfortunately they are sold separately, as he arrives too late to bid.

== Cast ==
- George Formby as George Withers
- Florence Desmond as Florrie
- Gus McNaughton as Max
- Alastair Sim as A. S. Drayton
- Harry Tate as auctioneer
- Enid Stamp-Taylor as Madame Louise
- Hal Gordon as sailor
- Tom Payne as man from Child Welfare
- Beatrix Fielden-Kaye as woman from Child Welfare
- Clifford Heatherley as Doctor Wilberforce
- Binkie Stuart as Binkie
- May Whitty as Aunt Georgina Withers
- Harvey Braban as Detective Jones
- Ethel Coleridge as spinster
- Syd Crossley as bus conductor
- Maud Gill as Fanny Tidmarsh
- Jimmy Godden as X-ray doctor
- Mike Johnson as Mr. O'Flaherty
- Margaret Moffatt as Mrs. O'Flaherty
- Frank Perfitt as bus inspector

In Associated Talking Pictures' original publicity material for the film, Binkie Stuart is referred to as Fiona Stuart.

== Critical reception ==
Monthly Film Bulletin said "The film takes its title from a song amusingly sung by George Formby on a bus in order to induce the passengers to keep their seats when they are becoming restive at the smell of a goat disguised as a dog. The majority of the situations and details are vulgar, but so handled as to be innocuous. George Formby as the simple George gives a good performance, and makes full use of his face which is well suited to the part. He is well supported by the rest of the cast, especially by Alastair Sim as a villainous lawyer."

Leslie Halliwell said: "Good star comedy on a theme later reworked in It's in the Bag [1944] and The Twelve Chairs [1970]."

Sky Movies wrote, "Formby's on form – especially singing 'Keep Your Seats, Please' and 'When I'm Cleaning Windows' – Florence Desmond's a much stronger leading lady than George usually had, and Alastair Sim made one of his first major impacts in films as the unscrupulous lawyer who also has his beady eye on the hidden fortune".

In British Sound Films: The Studio Years 1928–1959 David Quinlan rated the film as "good", writing: "One of the earliest versions of the Russian farce that has provided standard material for comics down the decades."

The Radio Times Guide to Films gave the film 3/5 stars, writing: "Ilya Ilf and Yevgeny Petrov's celebrated play The Twelve Chairs gets the George Formby treatment in this sprightly musical comedy. Taking time to intone such ukulele classics as "When I'm Cleaning Windows", Formby exhibits a bit more nous than usual, as he and girlfriend Florence Desmond pursue a set of antique chairs, one of which contains the jewels bequeathed him by an eccentric aunt. Formby is upstaged in every scene that he shares with the lugubrious Alastair Sim, as the shady lawyer hired to track down the furniture."
