= I Adore You (film) =

1933 film

- Trade advertisement from The Daily Film Renter (5 January 1934)
- Directed by: George King
- Written by: Paul England
- Based on: original story by W. Scott Darling
- Produced by: Irving Asher
- Starring: Margot Grahame; Harold French; Clifford Heatherley; O. B. Clarence; Peggy Novak
- Music by: Carroll Gibbons
- Production company: Warner Bros-Teddington
- Distributed by: Warner Bros
- Release date: 1933
- Country: United Kingdom
- Language: English

I Adore You is a 1933 British musical comedy film directed by George King and starring Margot Grahame, Harold French and Clifford Heatherley. Errol Flynn appears as an extra. It was written by Paul England based on an original story by W. Scott Darling. Choreography was by Ralph Reader, a protege of Busby Berkeley.

== Preservation status ==
The British Film Institute has classed I Adore You as a lost film. Its National Archive holds no film or video materials.

== Plot ==
Norman Young wants to marry Margot Grahame but her contract with a producer prohibits her from marrying during a five-year period. Norman spends millions to take over the contact.

== Cast ==
- Margot Grahame as herself
- Harold French as Norman Young
- Clifford Heatherley as Louis B. Koenig
- O.B. Clarence as Mr Young
- Peggy Novak as operator
- Georgie Harris as Mr Butcher
- Ernest Sefton as Pilbeam
- Gavin Gordon as Alphonso Bouillabaise
- Carroll Gibbons as himself
- Errol Flynn in a bit part

== Reception ==
Kine Weekly wrote: "A bright, unassuming song and dance show, a cheeky challenge to the type of entertainment at which the Americans are so adept, slight in story values, but bolstered up by spirited back studio detail in which satire and showmanship play a prominent part. The principal players thoroughly enter into the free and easy spirit of the entertainment, novel ideas are introduced into the dance ensembles that decorate the development, and the original numbers are interpreted by Caroll Gibbons and his Savoy Orpheans Band. Useful light entertainment for the masses and popular audiences."

The Daily Film Renter wrote: "Story slight, but tinged with genial satire on picture-making and interspersed with bright song numbers and cleverly arranged dance ensembles. ... Capably directed and artistically mounted. Should prove a good popular booking."

Picturegoer wrote: "Unpretentious but quite bright song and dance show, which is very slight in story values but is backed up by good backstage detail and some novel ideas in dance ensembles. ... Settings are not too elaborate, but they are effective, and there is a free and easy atmosphere about the whole thing which is quite pleasing."

Picture Show wrote: "0. B. Clarence is excellent as the old actor who is mistaken for the new owner. A series of musical comedy acts and some songs pad out the action."
