= Peggy Novak =

British actress (1907–1969)

- 1936 Spotlight photo (by Sasha)
- Born: Peggy Eileen Murphy; 1 November 1907; Birkenhead, Cheshire; United Kingdom
- Died: 13 August 1969 (aged 61); Harrow, Middlesex, England
- Occupation: Film actor
- Years active: 1933–1943
- Spouse: Robert Arthur Smith

Peggy Novak (1 November 1907 – 13 August 1969) was a British actress.

== Selected filmography ==
- Smithy (1933)
- I Adore You (1933)
- The Diplomatic Lover (1934)
- Oh No Doctor! (1934)
- Music Hall (1934)
- Flood Tide (1934)
- A Little Bit of Bluff (1935)
- A Real Bloke (1935)
- Cock o' the North (1935)
- School for Stars (1935)
- Jimmy Boy (1935)
- Luck of the Turf (1936)
- The Song of the Road (1937)
- South Riding (1938)
- Save a Little Sunshine (1938)
- Stardust (1938)
- The Ware Case (1938)
- Old Mother Riley in Society (1940)
- He Found a Star (1941)
