= Little Miss Somebody =

1937 British film by Walter Tennyson

- Trade show advertisement from The Daily Film Renter (8 October 1937)
- Directed by: Walter Tennyson
- Screenplay by: H. Fowler Mear
- Produced by: Walter Tennyson
- Starring: Marie Ault; Binkie Stuart; John Longden
- Cinematography: Geoffrey Faithfull
- Production company: Butcher's Film Service
- Release date: 1937
- Running time: 78 minutes
- Country: United Kingdom
- Language: English

Little Miss Somebody is a 1937 British film directed by Walter Tennyson and starring Marie Ault, Binkie Stuart and John Longden. It was written by H. Fowler Mear and produced by Butcher's Film Service.

== Plot ==
Orphan Binkie Sladen is looked after by her father's best friend Uncle Jim and his fiancée Mary Gray. They are poor but happy. When Angus Duncan arrives from Australia bearing the will of a rich old relative, leaving Binkie a fortune, the village squire Borden gets to hear of this, and manages to adopt Binkie and gain possession of the will. Jim lets Binkie go in the hope of her having a better upbringing than he can provide, but she is very unhappy. Jim contacts the police and is able to bring Binkie back to the home she loves.

== Cast ==
- Marie Ault as Martha Gribble
- Binkie Stuart as Binkie Sladen
- John Longden as Jim Trevor
- Kathleen Kelly as Mary Grey
- Jane Carr as Mrs Borden
- George Carney as Angus Duncan
- D.A. Clarke-Smith as Mr Borden
- Margaret Emden as Mrs Preacher
- Vivienne Chatterton as Amelia Sparkes
- C. Denier Warren as Jonas
- Hal Walters as Albert Sims
- J. Fisher White as Tom Shirley
- Ernest Sefton as Archibald Mortimer
- Cynthia Stock as Nurse Smythe
- Roddy Hughes as Moggs

== Reception ==
The Monthly Film Bulletin wrote: "Binkie Stuart is undeniably clever and delightful, and John Longden and Kathleen support her with great charm and naturalness. It is very well acted throughout and Jane Carr as the frivolous, stupid Mrs. Borden is a joy."

The Daily Film Renter wrote: "Diminutive Binkie Stuart plays leading role on winsome lines, acting, tap-dancing, and putting over song number with self-confidence surprising in one so young. Plot is of naive but popular variety, with robust characterisations, but child star's appealing personality and quota of broad hokum should make subject good proposition for masses."

Kine Weekly wrote: "Sentimental melodrama exploiting with no little regard for showmanship the astonishing yet winning versatility of Binkie Stuart, Britain's box-office baby star No. 1. ... Binkie Stuart acts with engaging absence of precocity, and also sings and dances attractively when the occasions demand."
