= Feather Your Nest =

1937 British film by William Beaudine

- Directed by: William Beaudine
- Written by: Austin Melford; Val Valentine; Robert Edmunds (uncredited); Anthony Kimmins (uncredited)
- Based on: Story by Ivar Campbell and Sheila Campbell
- Produced by: Basil Dean
- Starring: George Formby; Polly Ward; Enid Stamp-Taylor; Gilbert Russell
- Cinematography: Gordon Dines; Ronald Neame
- Edited by: Ernest Aldridge
- Music by: Ernest Irving
- Production company: Associated Talking Pictures
- Distributed by: Associated British Film Distributors
- Release date: March 1937
- Running time: 86 minutes
- Country: United Kingdom
- Language: English

Feather Your Nest is a 1937 British musical comedy film directed by William Beaudine and starring George Formby, Polly Ward and Enid Stamp-Taylor. It was written by Austin Melford and Val Valentine (and, uncredited, Robert Edmunds, Anthony Kimmins) from a story by Ivar Campbell and Sheila Campbell.

The film contains Formby's signature tune, "Leaning on a Lamp-post".

== Plot ==
A worker at a gramophone record factory surprisingly creates a hit song, "Leaning on a Lamp-post".

== Cast ==
- George Formby as Willie Piper
- Polly Ward as Mary Taylor
- Enid Stamp-Taylor as Daphne Randall
- Val Rosing as Rex Randall
- Davy Burnaby as Sir Martin
- Jack Barty as Mr Chester
- Clifford Heatherley as Randall's valet
- Frederick Burtwell as Murgatroyd
- Ethel Coleridge as Mrs Taylor
- Jimmy Godden as Mr Higgins
- Moore Marriott as Mr Jenkins
- Syd Crossley as Police Constable
- Frank Perfitt as studio manager
- Frederick Piper as Green
- Mike Johnson as Charlie
- Leonard Sharp as Mr. Peabody
- Harry Terry as furniture thief
- Hal Walters as man outside furniture shop
- Edie Martin as Blanche

== Critical reception ==
The Monthly Film Bulletin wrote: George Formby has three good songs including the catchy 'Leaning on a Lamppost' (the record). He makes the most of every opportunity the film gives him, displays very slow wits with considerable charm ... The rest of the cast give him good support, though they are not up to his own standard."

Kine Weekly wrote: "Bright, engaging comedy of middle-class life, turning briskly on the vacuous comicalities and inimitable versatility of George Formby. The slight but refreshing story paves the way to innumerable clever gags, and these in turn build up briskly to an exhilarating and eminently satisfactory happy ending. Supporting the star is a first-rate team, while the song numbers have melody and pointed lyrics."

Halliwell's Film Guide observed "the star in less farcical vein than usual."

TV Guide concluded, "not one of Formby's best films, but mildly enjoyable, nonetheless".
