= Clifford Heatherley =

English stage and film actor (1888–1937)

- Born: Clifford Heatherley Lamb; 8 October 1888; Preston, Lancashire, England
- Died: 15 September 1937 (aged 48); Edmonton, London, England
- Years active: 1908–1937

Clifford Heatherley Lamb (8 October 1888 in Preston, Lancashire – 15 September 1937 in London) was an English stage and film actor.

== Filmography ==
- Henry VIII (1911)
- Bleak House (1920)
- The Tavern Knight (1920)
- The Mystery of Mr. Bernard Brown (1921)
- The Autumn of Pride (1921)
- Mademoiselle from Armentieres (1926)
- The Sea Urchin (1926)
- The King's Highway (1927)
- The Rolling Road (1927)
- Boadicea (1927)
- Roses of Picardy (1927)
- Tesha (1928)
- The Passing of Mr. Quin (1928)
- The Constant Nymph (1928)
- Champagne (1928)
- High Treason (1929)
- Splinters (1929)
- The W Plan (1930)
- The Compulsory Husband (1930)
- Symphony in Two Flats (1930)
- Who Killed Doc Robin? (1931)
- Glamour (1931)
- The Love Habit (1931)
- Brother Alfred (1932)
- Fires of Fate (1932)
- Goodnight, Vienna (1932)
- After the Ball (1932)
- The Indiscretions of Eve (1932)
- Help Yourself (1932)
- Happy Ever After (1932)
- Yes, Mr Brown (1933)
- The Little Damozel (1933)
- I Adore You (1933)
- Forging Ahead (1933)
- Discord (1933)
- Beware of Women (1933)
- Smithy (1933)
- Bitter Sweet (1933)
- Cash (1933)
- Trouble in Store (short) (1934)
- The Private Life of Don Juan (1934)
- The Church Mouse (1934)
- The Rise of Catherine the Great (1934)
- The Queen's Affair (1934)
- Get Your Man (1934)
- Abdul the Damned (1935)
- The Invader (1935)
- No Monkey Business (1935)
- A Little Bit of Bluff (1935)
- Adventure Ltd. (1935)
- Cafe Mascot (1936)
- Reasonable Doubt (1936)
- Show Flat (1936)
- If I Were Rich (1936)
- Keep Your Seats, Please (1936)
- There Was a Young Man (1937)
- Don't Get Me Wrong (1937)
- It's Not Cricket (1937)
- Feather Your Nest (1937)

== Stage appearances ==
- Little Nellie Kelly (London production, 1923)
- The Desert Song (Drury Lane London production, 1927)
- Glamorous Night (Drury Lane, 1935)
