= Reginald Gardiner =

British actor (1903–1980)

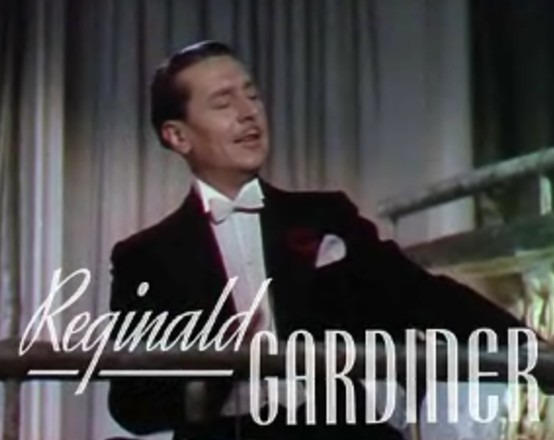
- Trailer for Sweethearts (1938)
- Born: William Reginald Gardiner; 27 February 1903; London, England, UK
- Died: 7 July 1980 (aged 77); Westwood, Los Angeles, California, U.S.
- Resting place: Forest Lawn Memorial Park, Hollywood Hills
- Occupation: Actor
- Years active: 1927–1968
- Spouse(s): Wyn Richmond (m. 19??; div. 19??) Nadia Petrova (m. 1942)
- Children: 2

William Reginald Gardiner (27 February 1903 – 7 July 1980) was an English actor on the stage, in films and on television.

== Early years ==
Gardiner was born in Wimbledon, England, and he was a graduate of the Royal Academy of Dramatic Art. His parents wanted him to be an architect, but he insisted on a career as an actor.

== Stage and radio ==
Gardiner started as a super on stage and eventually became well known on the West End stage. "He appeared in British revues, plays and films before delighting Broadway audiences in 1935 with a wallpaper imitation act in At Home Abroad." His other Broadway credits include Little Glass Clock and An Evening with Beatrice Lillie.

He was also well known to radio listeners, and was known on the air for his amusing train and car noises.

== Film ==
Gardiner worked in almost 100 movies. He started film work in crowd scenes, making his big film break in 1927 the silent film The Lodger, by Alfred Hitchcock.

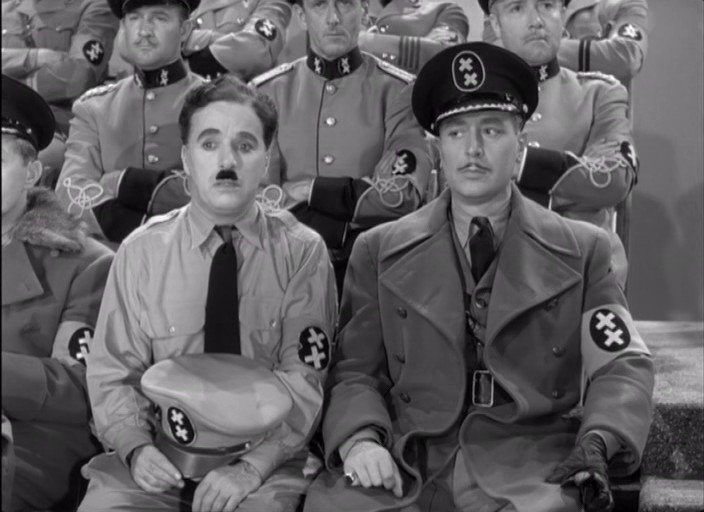
Gardiner and Charlie Chaplin in The Great Dictator (1940)

His Hollywood film debut came in 1936. During his career he was cast in numerous roles, often as a British butler. One of his most famous roles was that of Schultz in Charlie Chaplin's The Great Dictator. He also performed memorable turns as Beverly Carlton (a parody of Noël Coward) in The Man Who Came to Dinner, the spurned "almost-husband" in The Doctor Takes a Wife, Christmas in Connecticut and – one of his most memorable roles – in the Laurel and Hardy epic The Flying Deuces.

== Television ==
Gardiner made numerous guest appearances on television in the 1950s and 1960s, including an episode of Alfred Hitchcock Presents ("Banquo's Chair"), Fess Parker's ABC series, Mr. Smith Goes to Washington, and Stanley Holloway's Our Man Higgins. In 1964, he guest-starred in the Perry Mason episode "The Case of the Ugly Duckling", as business owner Albert Charity, and in the role of Mr. Maudlin in the season 6, episode 19, "Dead as a Dude" of 77 Sunset Strip. In 1966, Gardiner was featured on Green Acres as orchestra conductor Sir Geoffrey in the episode "Culture". In 1967, he made a guest appearance on Petticoat Junction in the episode "Uncle Joe and the Master Plan", as Gaylord Martindale and, in 1968, he appeared as a butler in an episode of “The Monkees” titled “The Monkees Mind Their Manor” – his final performance. Gardiner's last major role was alongside Phyllis Diller in her 1966–1967 ABC series The Pruitts of Southampton.

== Recordings ==
Gardiner recorded a curious and eccentric classic called "Trains", which was regularly played on the 1950s British radio programme Children's Favourites. This record consisted of a tipsy-sounding Gardiner reciting a monologue, which he first introduced in the 1935 Broadway revue At Home Abroad, about steam railway engines (which he claimed were 'livid beasts') and impersonating both the engines themselves and the sound of trains running on the track. This latter he famously characterised as 'diddly-dee, diddly-dum' to mimic the sound pattern as the four pairs of bogie wheels ran over joins between the lengths of track – a sound no longer heard since welded rail joins were introduced. "Trains" was released as a 78 and a 45 by English Decca Records (F 5278) which remained on catalogue into the 1970s. At the end of the record Gardiner signs off with "Well folks, that's all: back to the asylum." He was summoned to Buckingham Palace to give a performance in person.

== Personal life ==
Gardiner was married twice. He first married Wyn Richmond, a British actress, but they divorced. Later he married model Nadia Petrova. Gardiner and Nadia Petrova had a son Peter Robert Gardiner, born on April 25, 1949.

== Death ==
Gardiner died of a heart attack at his home in Westwood, California, on 7 July 1980. He was survived by his wife Nadia.

== Filmography ==
- The Lodger (1927) - Dancer at Ball (uncredited)
- The Perfect Lady (1931) - Lord Tony Carderay
- Josser on the River (1932) - Donald
- Leave It to Smith (1933) - Lord Redwood
- Radio Parade (1933) - Himself
- The Diplomatic Lover (1934) - Dersingham
- Virginia's Husband (1934) - John Craddock
- Borrow a Million (1934) - Alastair Cartwright
- A Little Bit of Bluff (1935) - Hugh Rigby
- Royal Cavalcade (1935) - Bus Conductor
- Opening Night (1935)
- Born to Dance (1936) - Policeman
- A Damsel in Distress (1937) - Keggs
- Everybody Sing (1938) - Jerrold Hope
- Marie Antoinette (1938) - Comte d'Artois
- Sweethearts (1938) - Norman Trumpett
- The Girl Downstairs (1938) - Willie
- The Flying Deuces (1939) - François
- The Night of Nights (1939) - J. Neville Prime
- The Doctor Takes a Wife (1940) - John Pierce
- Dulcy (1940) - Schuyler Van Dyke
- The Great Dictator (1940) - Commander Schultz
- My Life with Caroline (1941) - Paul
- A Yank in the R.A.F. (1941) - Roger Pillby
- Sundown (1941) - Lieutenant Rodney 'Roddy' Turner
- The Man Who Came to Dinner (1942) - Beverly Carlton
- Captains of the Clouds (1942) - Scrounger Harris
- Immortal Sergeant (1943) - Tom Benedict
- Forever and a Day (1943) - Assistant Hotel Manager
- Claudia (1943) - Jerry Seymour
- Sweet Rosie O'Grady (1943) - Charles, Duke of Trippingham
- The Horn Blows at Midnight (1945) - Composer / Archibald 'Archie' Dexter
- Molly and Me (1945) - Harry Phillips / Peabody, the Butler
- Christmas in Connecticut (1945) - John Sloan
- The Dolly Sisters (1945) - Tony, Duke of Breck
- Do You Love Me (1946) - Herbert Benham
- One More Tomorrow (1946) - James 'Jim' Aloysius Fisk
- Cluny Brown (1946) - Hilary Ames
- I Wonder Who's Kissing Her Now (1947) - Will Hough
- Fury at Furnace Creek (1948) - Captain Grover A. Walsh
- That Lady in Ermine (1948) - Alberto
- That Wonderful Urge (1948) - Count André de Guyon
- Wabash Avenue (1950) - English Eddie
- I'll Get By (1950) - Himself (uncredited)
- Halls of Montezuma (1951) - Sergeant Johnson
- Elopement (1951) - Roger Evans
- Androcles and the Lion (1952) - Lentulus
- Black Widow (1954) - Brian Mullen
- Ain't Misbehavin' (1955) - Anatole Piermont Rogers
- The Birds and the Bees (1956) - Gerald
- The Story of Mankind (1957) - William Shakespeare
- Rock-A-Bye Baby (1958) - Harold Hermann
- Alfred Hitchcock Presents (1959) (Season 4 Episode 29: "Banquo's Chair") - Major Cook-Finch
- Back Street (1961) - Dalian
- Mr. Hobbs Takes a Vacation (1962) - Reggie McHugh
- What a Way to Go! (1964) - Painter
- Sergeant Deadhead (1965) - Lieutenant Commander Talbott
- Do Not Disturb (1965) - Simmons

== Selected stage credits ==
- Chance Acquaintance by John Van Druten (1927)
- A Present from Margate by Ian Hay (1933)

== Radio appearances ==
Year	Program	Episode/source
1944	Suspense	Voyage Through Darkness The Merry Widower
