= Television Talent =

- Directed by: Robert Edmunds
- Written by: R. Howard Alexander; Robert Edmunds
- Produced by: R. Howard Alexander
- Starring: Richard Goolden; Hal Walters; Polly Ward
- Production company: Alexander Films
- Distributed by: Ambassador Film Productions
- Release date: November 1937
- Running time: 56 minutes
- Country: United Kingdom
- Language: English

Television Talent is a 1937 British comedy film directed by Robert Edmunds and starring Richard Goolden, Hal Walters and Polly Ward. The film was a quota quickie. The plot concerns a music teacher who takes part in a talent contest.

== Cast ==
- Richard Goolden as Professor Langley
- Gene Sheldon as Herbert Dingle
- Hal Walters as Steve Bagley
- Polly Ward as Mary Hilton

== Bibliography ==
- Chibnall, Steve. Quota Quickies: The Birth of the British 'B' Film. British Film Institute, 2007.
- Low, Rachael. Filmmaking in 1930s Britain. George Allen & Unwin, 1985.
- Wood, Linda. British Films, 1927–1939. British Film Institute, 1986.
