= Moonlight Sonata (film) =

- Directed by: Lothar Mendes
- Screenplay by: Edward Knoblock; E. M. Delafield (Additional dialogue)
- Story by: Hans Rameau
- Produced by: Lothar Mendes
- Starring: Ignacy Jan Paderewski; Charles Farrell; Marie Tempest; Barbara Greene; Eric Portman
- Cinematography: Jan Stallich
- Edited by: Philip Charlot
- Production company: Pall Mall Productions
- Distributed by: United Artists
- Release dates: 11 February 1937 (United Kingdom); 9 May 1938 (United States)
- Running time: 86 minutes
- Country: United Kingdom
- Language: English

Moonlight Sonata is a 1937 British drama film directed by Lothar Mendes and written by E. M. Delafield and Edward Knoblock. The film stars Ignacy Jan Paderewski, Charles Farrell, Marie Tempest, Barbara Greene and Eric Portman. The film was released on 11 February 1937, by United Artists and re-released in 1943 as The Charmer (shortened).

== Plot ==
In Sweden, Eric Molander (Charles Farrell) professes his genuine love for Ingrid (Barbara Greene), the beautiful young granddaughter of baroness Lindenborg (Marie Tempest). Meanwhile, in the nearby countryside, a plane with Paderewski and two other passengers on board is forced to land due to mechanical problems. The travellers take refuge at the baroness's country estate; one of them, worldly Mario de la Costa (Eric Portman), uses his deceptive charm to steal the naive young Ingrid away from her honest-hearted lover. With Paderewski's help – he plays a hauntingly beautiful rendition of Beethoven's "Moonlight Sonata" which soothingly calms the flighty-minded Ingrid and allows her to come to her senses – Eric exposes Mario as a shameless fortune-hunter who already has a wife, and the young hero and heroine are reunited. Seen at the beginning of the film as a happily married couple who are attending one of Mr. Paderewski's packed piano recitals, Eric and Ingrid have become the joyful parents of an adorable curly-headed little damsel who herself gets to meet the great artist in person at the concert (while enthusiastically clapping along with everyone else, the toddler had accidentally dropped her bouncy-ball which had rolled up the aisle and onto the stage, where the smilingly-amused Paderewski had caught the ball and graciously returned it to the little girl with a bow and a tender handshake, much to the charmed delight of both her parents and the thunderously-applauding crowd); at Ingrid's request, Paderewski then plays the Moonlight Sonata as his finale. During an after-concert gathering of his closest friends and business-associates, Paderewski begins to relate the details shown in the remainder of the movie, and how his playing of the Moonlight Sonata five years prior had helped cement the romantic bond between the little girl's mother and father. It is also revealed that Mr. Paderewski's playing of this very same lovely melody some two decades earlier had fortuitously brought Ingrid's own parents together, as well.

== Cast ==
- Ignacy Jan Paderewski as Himself
- Charles Farrell as Eric Molander
- Marie Tempest as Baroness Lindenborg
- Barbara Greene as Ingrid Hansen
- Eric Portman as Mario de la Costa
- W. Graham Brown as Dr. Kurt Broman
- Queenie Leonard as Margit
- Laurence Hanray as Mr. Bishop
- Binkie Stuart as Eric and Ingrid's Child

== Critical reception ==
The New York Times wrote, "LONDON has at last seen "Moonlight Sonata," the film which Paderewski made at Denham last Summer for Lothar Mendez. It is an elegant little picture, set in a beautiful villa among the Swedish firs, and made with a dignity and simplicity worthy of the great figure for whom it was composed. The film begins with a concert at which Paderewski plays the whole of Liszt's Second Hungarian Rhapsody and the first movement of the Moonlight Sonata. Later in the film he plays his own Minuet. The recording of these pieces is excellent and the close-ups of the great pianist and of his hands are fascinating. For the rest he fits simply and unobtrusively into a simple story, speaking with slow precision and acting as naturally as if he were playing his part in real life"; while Leonard Maltin gave the film two and a half out of four stars, and noted "Well-made but stodgy romance, set in household of Swedish baroness, is excuse for screen appearance by famous concert pianist."
