= Stardust (1938 film) =

1938 film

- Directed by: Melville W. Brown
- Written by: John E. Harding; John Meehan Jr.
- Produced by: William Rowland
- Starring: Lupe Vélez; Ben Lyon; Wallace Ford
- Cinematography: Erwin Hillier
- Edited by: Julian Caunter
- Music by: Larry Ceballos
- Production company: Morgan Productions
- Distributed by: British Lion Films; Grand National Pictures (US)
- Release date: 25 March 1938
- Running time: 75 minutes
- Country: United Kingdom
- Language: English

Stardust (also known as Mad About Money and He Loved an Actress) is a 1938 British musical comedy film directed by Melville W. Brown and starring Lupe Vélez, Ben Lyon and Wallace Ford. It was written by John Meehan Jr. from an original story by John E. Harding.

== Synopsis ==
In order to grab some headlines a rumba dancer pretends to be a South American heiress. She takes in an aspiring independent film producer who tries to persuade her to invest in his first screen production. As each bluffs the other film moves towards completion.

== Cast ==
- Lupe Vélez as Carla de Huelva
- Ben Lyon as Roy Harley
- Wallace Ford as Peter Jackson
- Jean Colin as Diana West
- Harry Langdon as Otto Schultz
- Mary Cole as Peggy
- Cyril Raymond as Jerry Sears
- Ronald Ward as Eric Williams
- Arthur Finn as J.D. Meyers
- Philip Pearman as Prince
- Andreas Malandrinos as mbassador
- Olive Sloane as Gloria Dane
- Peggy Novak as secretary
- John Stobart as headwaiter
- Albert Whelan as judge
- Ronald Hill as District Attorney
- Alan Shires as Dance Partner

== Production ==
Production began in November 1936 at the Rock Studios in Elstree. The film's sets were designed by the art director George Provis. Special effects were by the New Zealand artist Len Lye.

== Reception ==
The Monthly Film Bulletin wrote: "For no apparent reason, there are some surprising 'effects' introduced by Len Lye, including a rocket trip to Saturn with a ballet of the stars, and the trial of a modern composer by the ghosts of past musicians. These interludes of pure fantasy help to redeem a film which otherwise suffers from lack of continuity and bad cutting. Jean Colin makes a charming heroine, Lupe Velez a sufficiently exotic 'cattle queen', and Ben Lyon is amiable and handsome enough as the young producer."

The Daily Film Renter wrote: "Disjointed and incomprehensible story ... Narrative vague and rambling, with irritatingly irrelevant side issues queering plot pitch, and characterisation blatantly artificial, but elaborate chorine ensembles, smart settings, and tuneful song interludes have mild entertainment quota, while cast has four useful marquee names. If cut, may prove passable support for not too critical audiences."

Kine Weekly wrote: "Light musical comedy, that's the official label of this British picture. It might, however, be anything. The action takes place behind the scenes of film production, and so incongruous are the invasions of song and spectacle and disjointed the continuity that for the most part it has difficulty in making sense, let alone really good entertainment. Only bits and pieces amuse."

Picturegoer wrote: "Action takes place behind the scenes of a film production but it is such an incongruous mixture of song and spectacle that it fails to register to any extent. The continuity is ragged and the entertainment is patchy in consequence."

Picture Show wrote: "This is a sort of musical comedy, but it is a strange jumble of song and spectacle and peeps behind the scenes of film-making. ... The cast merit far better material."
