= Richard Ainley =

English actor (1910–1967)

- Ainley in 1937.
- Born: 22 December 1910; Stanmore, Middlesex, England
- Died: 18 May 1967 (aged 56); Muswell Hill, London, England
- Years active: 1936–1943
- Spouses: Ethel Glendinning; Betzi Beaton; Rowena Woolf
- Father: Henry Ainley
- Relatives: Anthony Ainley (half-brother)

Richard Ainley (22 December 1910 – 18 May 1967) was a British stage and film actor.

== Biography ==
He was born in Middlesex, England, the son of Henry Ainley and a half-brother of Anthony Ainley.

Ainley made his stage debut in 1928, initially using the stage name Richard Riddle, taking his mother's maiden name. His American debut came in Foreigners at the Belasco Theater in 1939.

His first motion picture appearance was in 1936 as Sylvius in As You Like It, in which his father also appeared. Other roles included Ferdinand in the television movie of The Tempest (1939), Dr. Hale in Shining Victory (1941), and a Foreign Office official in the thriller Above Suspicion (1943).

Ainley married three times, firstly to actress Ethel Glendinning. He was divorced from his first two wives; his third wife Rowena Woolf died in 1968.

He retired from film work following a disabling wound received while he was serving in the army during World War II to return to the stage. He was briefly principal of the Bristol Old Vic Theatre School in the early 1960s.

== Filmography ==
Year	Title	Role	Notes
1936	As You Like It	Sylvius	
1937	The Frog	Ray Bennett	
1937	Our Fighting Navy	Lieutenant	Uncredited
1937	The Gang Show, aka The Gang	Whipple	
1938	Old Iron	Harry Woodstock	
1938	Lily of Laguna	Roger Fielding	
1939	Stolen Life	Morgan	
1939	There Ain't No Justice	Billy Frist	
1940	An Englishman's Home	Geoffrey Brown	
1940	Lady with Red Hair	Lou Payne	
1941	Here Comes Happiness	Jelliffe Blaine	
1941	Knockout	Allison	
1941	Singapore Woman	John Wetherby	
1941	Shining Victory	Dr. Hale	
1941	Bullets for O'Hara	McKay Standish	
1941	The Smiling Ghost	Cousin Tennant Bentley	
1941	Passage from Hong Kong	Lt. Norman MacNeil-Fraser	
1942	White Cargo	Mr. Worthing	
1943	Three Hearts for Julia	Philip Barrows	
1943	Du Barry Was a Lady	Marching Rebel Behind King Louis	Uncredited
1943	Above Suspicion	Peter Galt	
1943	The Man from Down Under	Military Doctor	Uncredited
1943	I Dood It	Larry West	
