= Brian Jones (poet) =

British poet

Brian Jones (10 December 1938 – 25 June 2009) was a British poet. He was educated at Ealing County Grammar School for Boys and Selwyn College, Cambridge.

Jones' first major collection, Poems (consisting of his first book, The Madman in the Reading Room and thirty-seven other poems), was published in 1966, and proved to be successful. Those poems dealt with both the joy and the unease that may be present beneath the surface of what seems to be placid middle-class domesticity. This was very much in a style popular in the 1950s and 1960s, and Jones was described by Edward Lucie-Smith in a 1970 anthology of post-war British poetry as "certainly one of the very best practitioners of this overworked vein". Subsequent critical assessments of his work have included the following:

"Jones believes that poetry need not surrender to fiction all the stories that need telling, but his poems retain the tightness of verse and the authority of good cadences. There is as much truth to surface detail in his work as in any recent novel, with a good deal of eloquence added." – Peter Porter

"It is his concern with truth-telling that unifies Brian Jones’s work and gives The Island Normal its strength, a poetry austere without coldness and colloquial without slackness. Why is he so little known, so rarely discussed?" – Grevel Lindop

"[Jones’s] leveller-like anger at England’s waste of human potential arises from a deep love of his inheritance and a real fear for its future. [He has] provided us with fine poems and a continuous thirty-year commentary from the backroom of the dispossessed." – Peter Bland

Two of Brian Jones's best-known children's poems are About Friends and How to catch Tiddlers.

Jones was awarded the 1967 Cholmondeley Award along with Seamus Heaney and Norman Nicholson, and an Eric Gregory Trust Fund Award in 1968.

== Publications ==
- 1966: Poems (London: Alan Ross) His first book, The Madman in the Reading Room, with thirty-seven other poems.
- 1968: A Family Album (London: Alan Ross) A collection of four poem-sequences.
  (The first two collections were reissued as one volume by Alan Ross in 1972.)
- 1969: Interior (London: Alan Ross) A collection of twenty-five poems.
- 1970: The Mantis Hand and Other Poems (Gillingham: ARC) A collection of nine poems.
- 1974: For Mad Mary (London: London Magazine Editions) A collection containing five sequences of poems, including The Courtenay Play.
- 1975: The Spitfire on the Northern Line (London: Chatto & Windus - Chatto Poets for the Young) A collection of poems for children.
- 1978: The Island Normal (Manchester: Carcanet New Press) A collection of sixty-one poems.
- 1985: Children of Separation (Manchester: Carcanet Press) A collection of thirty-eight poems.
- 1990: Freeborn John (Manchester: Carcanet Press) A collection of fifty-seven poems.
- 2013: New & Selected Poems (Nottingham: Shoestring Press) A selection from Jones's previously published work, as well as previously unpublished poems, edited by Paul McLoughlin. The collection was reviewed in londongrip.co.uk, Winter 2013/14 and described as "a fine book that deserves to be widely read"
