= Freddie Grisewood =

British broadcaster

Frederick Henry Grisewood OBE (11 April 1888 – 15 November 1972) was a British broadcaster, who had a long and varied career with the BBC. He was perhaps best known for being the host of Any Questions? from its inception in 1948 until 1968.

== Biography ==
Grisewood was born in Daylesford, Gloucestershire. He was educated at Radley College, and later at Magdalen College, University of Oxford.

He served with the Oxfordshire and Buckinghamshire Light Infantry during World War I, eventually rising to the rank of lieutenant.

He first worked for the BBC as an announcer in 1929. In 1932, the Daily Express published his name, along with those of several of his fellow announcers; before that date the BBC had required them to maintain on-air anonymity.

In 1937, he was the commentator for the coronation of King George VI and Queen Elizabeth, the first-ever BBC live outside television broadcast. The BBC had only taken delivery of its first Outside Broadcast unit which consisted of several vans two days before the Coronation. Although no one had any experience of operating it, it was placed at the top of Constitution Hill to catch the Royal Carriage as it went past. A message was sent to the King asking him to give a special wave for the camera. Grisewood was the commentator though as the number of television sets in homes was still very small, probably less than 1,000, his audience would be minute. He would recount how just as the Royal carriage appeared in the distance, all the equipment failed. The engineer in charge swore, gave it a hefty kick and it all came to life again so the day was saved.

He commentated on the first televised broadcast of a tennis match at Wimbledon, on 21 June 1937. In 1938, he hosted the first UK game show, the 15-minute Spelling Bee.

Grisewood was a good cricketer, and played one first-class match: for Worcestershire against Oxford University at The University Parks in June 1908. Although Worcestershire won the game by the wide margin of 332 runs, Grisewood made no significant personal contribution to his side's victory: he scored 1 and 6 not out, and neither bowled nor held a catch. Despite having played against his university at first-class level, he never appeared for it.

He continued to work as a freelance broadcaster well into the 1960s. He was chairman of Any Questions? from 1948 to 1967.

Grisewood died aged 84 in Grayshott, Hampshire.
