= Lily of Laguna (film) =

1938 film

- Jenny Laird, Richard Ainley, Nora Swinburne and Claire Arnold in the film.
- Directed by: Oswald Mitchell
- Written by: Joan Morgan; Oswald Mitchell
- Produced by: Sidney Morgan
- Starring: Nora Swinburne; Richard Ainley; Talbot O'Farrell
- Cinematography: Geoffrey Faithfull
- Music by: Percival Mackey
- Production company: Dreadnought Films
- Distributed by: Butcher's Film Service
- Release date: 1938
- Running time: 94 minutes
- Country: United Kingdom
- Language: English

Lily of Laguna is a 1938 British drama film directed by Oswald Mitchell and starring Nora Swinburne, Richard Ainley and Talbot O'Farrell. It was written by Joan Morgan and Mitchell, and made at Walton Studios. It takes its title from the music hall song "Lily of Laguna".

== Preservation status ==
The British Film Institute National Archive holds a collection of ephemera and stills but no film or video materials.

== Plot ==
Gloria Grey is the star of the successful musical Lily of Laguna. She gives up performing to marry Scottish scientist Gerald Marshall, but after three years Gerald divorces her, gaining custody of their child Jane, and Gloria returns to the theatre. Years later Jane falls in love with radio producer Roger Fielding, whom her mother also loves.

== Cast ==
- Nora Swinburne as Gloria Grey
- Richard Ainley as Roger Fielding
- Talbot O'Farrell as Mike
- G. H. Mulcaster as Gerald Marshall
- Jenny Laird as Jane Marshall
- Edgar Driver as Tommy Thompson
- Desmond Roberts as Arnold Egerton
- Violet Graham as Margaret Marshall
- Claire Arnold as Nellie

== Reception ==
Kine Weekly wrote: "Here we have a mother-love drama that wisely appeals to the heart rather than the head. Sentiment is its sturdy sheet anchor, and this is represented by delightfully reminiscent tunes by Leslie Stuart, one of which gives the film its title, and a kindly alternation of romance, humour and ingenious emotionalism. Already tried out with success on the masses, the formula will register yet again in similar circumstances. The acting is good."

The Monthly Film Bulletin wrote: "The film is inclined to be tedious and could have been shortened by the excision of some episodes. The photography is good, but the settings are occasionally poor. The acting is good, especially that of Richard Newton as Miguel Ruiz and of Richard Ainley as Roger. The character of the scientist is a caricature of an intelligent person – the Professor as imagined by the ignorant."
