= Talbot O'Farrell =

English music hall singer and film actor (1878–1952)

- an illustration of O'Farrel ca. 1919
- Born: William Parrott; 27 July 1878; Hull, Yorkshire, England
- Died: 2 September 1952 (aged 74); London, England
- Other name: Will (or Jock) McIver
- Occupations: Singer, comic entertainer, film actor
- Years active: 1902–1948

Talbot O'Farrell (born William Parrott; 27 July 1878 – 2 September 1952) was an English music hall and variety show singer whose repertoire included both sentimental and comic songs. Early in his career he used the stage names Will (or Jock) McIver (or McIvor).

== Biography ==
William Parrott was born in Hull, Yorkshire. He sang in clubs and small halls in the north of England from the age of ten, and then served in the Army during the Boer War. After leaving military service he worked as a policeman, but continued to perform and made his first stage appearance in London in 1902, billed as Jock McIver, "Scottish Comedian and Vocalist". In 1906 he performed as Will McIvor [sic]. In the 1911 census, he was recorded as Will McIvor, music hall artiste, lodging in Putney, London with Minnie Lindley. She had been born in Batley into a prominent West Riding family, the daughter of Ann and Joseph Talbot JP. According to press obituaries, she had been wedded to William Lindley, with three young daughters, before marrying O'Farrell, and they remained married for about forty years.

After several years of modest success as Will (or Jock) McIver, in about 1912 he adopted the name Talbot O'Farrell, taking part of his stage name from his wife's maiden name. He cultivated an Irish accent and sang Irish songs, but his persona was the opposite of a stereotypical stage Irishman. He dressed "with immaculate black coat, check trousers, waistcoat, white gloves, spats and grey silk topper, and was dubbed... 'The Irishman from Savile Row'". He quickly became popular in London, singing mostly sentimental songs such as "That Old Fashioned Mother of Mine", and "The Lisp of a Baby's Prayer". He held the record for most headlining appearances at the Victoria Palace Theatre, appeared in the 1925 Royal Variety Performance, and toured in the United States, Canada, Australia and South Africa. At one point he was billed as "The greatest Irish entertainer of all time".

From about 1920, he made many recordings, mostly for Imperial Records, including "That Old Fashioned Mother Of Mine" (1920), "My Mammy" (1924), and "Charmaine" (1927). He made his first radio broadcast in 1927, and appeared frequently on BBC radio variety shows in later years. He made a successful living prior to 1928, when he was worth £10,000 (equivalent to £185,000 in 2025), and in 1930 he served as 'King Rat' of the show business charity, the Grand Order of Water Rats. The worldwide depression severely reduced his income from the theatre, and he was bankrupt by 1933. He acted in several films; notably, Born Lucky (1933), Rose of Tralee (two films, of 1937 and of 1942) and Little Dolly Daydream (1938). In 1938, he appeared in two episodes of the BBC Television live variety show Cabaret.

In 1939, he appeared with Hetty King, Harry Tate, G. H. Elliott and others in the show Their Names Made Variety, first performed at the Holborn Empire which then toured nationally. During the Second World War, he worked for the Entertainments National Service Association (ENSA). After the end of the war, he again toured as part of a variety package of old-time music hall stars, in Thanks for the Memory, produced by Don Ross. According to Richard Anthony Baker, O'Farrell insisted on top billing and the best dressing room, but after this was refused he toured nonetheless. As part of the show, O'Farrell performed in the 1948 Royal Variety Performance.

By the time of his wife's death in 1949, the two were living in a flat at Gordon Mansions, Fitzrovia. He died at University College Hospital, London, in 1952, aged 74.

== Partial discography ==
- 1920 – "Who'll Take the Place of Mary?", cylinder Edison Blue Amberol 4064
- 1920 – "I'd Just Paint the Leaf of the Shamrock", cylinder Edison Blue Amberol 4094
- 1920 – "That Old Fashioned Mother of Mine", cylinder Edison Blue Amberol 4104
- 1920 – "The Kingdom Within Your Eyes", cylinder Edison Blue Amberol 4139
- 1929 – "Afterwards May Be Too Late" / "My Inspiration Is You", 10" 78rpm single Piccadilly 134
- 1929 – "Smiling Irish Eyes", 7-inch 78 rpm single The Victory 150b
- 1929 – "This Is Heaven" / "Excuse Me, Lady", 10-inch 78 rpm single Imperial 2169
- 1930 – "My Angel Mother", 7-inch 78 rpm single The Victory 271b
- Before 1931 – "The More We Are Together (The Froth Blowers' Anthem)", 6-inch 78 rpm single Mimosa P106b
- Before 1931 – "Charmaine", 6-inch 78 rpm single Mimosa P177b
- 1931 – "When Your Hair Has Turned to Silver (I Will Love You Just the Same)", 8-inch 78 rpm single Eclipse 35b
- 1931 – "When the Moon Comes over the Mountain", 8-inch 78 rpm single Eclipse 103a
- 1931 or 1932 – "Love Letters In The Sand"/"Terence's Farewell To Kathleen", 8-inch 78 rpm single Eclipse 172

== Selected filmography ==
- Born Lucky (1933)
- Rose of Tralee (1937)
- Little Dolly Daydream (1938)
- Lily of Laguna (1938)
- Rose of Tralee (1942)
