= Ron Fogg =

English footballer (1938–2020)

Personal information
- Full name: Ronald William James Fogg
- Date of birth: 3 June 1938
- Place of birth: Tilbury, England
- Date of death: 3 November 2020 (aged 82)
- Positions: Forward; defender

Youth career
- Tilbury

Senior career*
| Years | Team | Apps | (Gls) |
| 1959–1960 | Southend United | 2 | (0) |
- Grays Athletic
| 1960–1963 | Weymouth | | |
| 1963–1965 | Aldershot | 64 | (28) |
| 1965–1966 | Hereford United | | |
| 1966–1969 | Bedford Town | | |
| 1969–1971 | Chelmsford City | 42 | (1) |
- Brentwood Town
- Stevenage
- Woodford Town
| 1972–1973 | Dartford | | |
- * Club domestic league appearances and goals

Ronald William James Fogg (3 July 1938 – 3 November 2020) was an English professional footballer who played in the Football League as a forward.

== Career ==
In 1959, Fogg signed for Football League club Southend United, from hometown club Tilbury, making two league appearances in his only season at Southend. In 1960, Fogg signed for Weymouth from Grays Athletic, making 159 appearances in all competitions, scoring 100 goals, before a £2,000 transfer back to the Football League with Aldershot in 1963. Following 28 league goals in 64 appearances, Fogg signed for Hereford United in 1965, moving to Bedford Town a year later. In September 1969, after 37 goals in 147 appearances, Fogg signed for Chelmsford City, following a successful trial. Fogg was moved into defence during his time with Chelmsford, scoring two goals in 71 appearances in all competitions. Following his release by the club in 1971, Fogg played for Brentwood Town, Stevenage, Woodford Town and Dartford.
