= Little Dolly Daydream =

1938 British film by Oswald Mitchell

- Trade advertisement
- Directed by: Oswald Mitchell
- Screenplay by: Oswald Mitchell
- Produced by: John F. Argyle
- Starring: Binkie Stuart; Jane Welsh; Talbot O'Farrell
- Cinematography: Geoffrey Faithfull
- Production company: Argyle Talking Pictures
- Release date: 1938
- Running time: 82 minutes
- Country: United Kingdom
- Language: English

Little Dolly Daydream is a 1938 British film directed and written by Oswald Mitchell and starring Binkie Stuart, Jane Welsh and Talbot O'Farrell.

It was re-released in 1943.

== Plot ==
When her actress mother can no longer support her, little Dolly is taken away by her stern and unloving aunt. Dolly runs away, and meets Old Moe, an organ-grinder, who is involved with a gang of crooks planning a jewel robbery. Dolly and Moe help to get the thieves arrested. Moe takes Dolly back to her mother, who now has a steady club engagement, and they are reunited.

== Cast ==
- Binkie Stuart as Dolly
- Jane Welsh as Claire
- Talbot O'Farrell as Old Moe
- Warren Jenkins as Jack Kelly
- Eric Fawcett as Richard
- Cathleen Nesbitt as Miss Parker
- Sydney Fairbrother as Mrs Harris
- G.H. Mulcaster as Warton
- Arthur E. Owen as Spider

== Reception ==
The Monthly Film Bulletin wrote: "The simple, naive and homely story will make a wide appeal to lovers of sentiment, simple pathos and pleasant comedy. Binkie Stuart is a most self-possessed and engaging four-year-old. She does conscientiously and carefully all that is asked of her, and is natural and delightful with her incessant questions and determination to know the reason why. Variety is provided by cabaret interludes and Night Club scenes, and less successfully by the gangster incident. ... The direction is efficient and workmanlike. Little Binkie is supported by a thoroughly competent cast."

Kine Weekly wrote: "The picture frankly sets out to appeal to the masses, and succeeds admirably in that aim. With strong title, captivating performance of the diminutive star and tuneful song numbers, it is a certain winner in its class. ... Binkie Stuart plays Dolly with irresistible juvenile charm that will enlist the sympathy of most audiences, and will make a special appeal to the feminine customers. She puts over 'The Teddy Bear's Picnic' with a remarkable sense of rhythm and tune."
