= It's in the Air (1938 film) =

It’s in the Air
- UK film poster
- Directed by: Anthony Kimmins
- Written by: Anthony Kimmins
- Produced by: Basil Dean; Jack Kitchin
- Starring: George Formby; Polly Ward; Jack Hobbs
- Cinematography: Ronald Neame; Gordon Dines
- Edited by: Ernest Aldridge
- Music by: Ernest Irving
- Production company: Associated Talking Pictures
- Distributed by: ABFD
- Release dates: November 1938; 9 December 1940 (New York)
- Running time: 87 minutes
- Country: United Kingdom
- Language: English

It’s in the Air is a 1938 British comedy film written and directed by Anthony Kimmins and starring George Formby, Polly Ward and Jack Hobbs. The film was released in the United States with the alternative title George Takes the Air in 1940. The film depicts Great Britain's preparations for war with ARP warden training, mock air attacks dropping poison gas bombs and the deployment of antiaircraft weapons in the streets.

== Plot ==
After George Brown is rejected as an air-raid warden, he wears his brother-in-law's Royal Air Force uniform and realises that his brother-in-law has left behind some very important papers in the pockets. He delivers the despatches to a nearby RAF station, whereupon George is mistaken for a despatch rider from headquarters. Although he becomes the butt of jokes from his corporal, George stays indefinitely at the RAF air base. He soon falls in love with the sergeant major's daughter Peggy, a base NAAFI girl, and when Corporal Craig, who also fancies her, discovers his real identity, he threatens to report George.

On the day of an annual inspection, George attempts to escape the base and finds himself in a Hawker Audax aircraft that is being readied for a test flight. While the inspector watches, George's aerial display is memorable and the inspector insists that George should be commended. George manages to land the aircraft and is accepted as a flyer by the RAF.

== Cast ==
- George Formby as George Brown
- Polly Ward as Peggy
- Jack Hobbs as Corporal Craig
- Julien Mitchell as The Sergeant Major
- Garry Marsh as Commanding Officer Wing Commander Hill
- Ilena Sylva as Anne Brown
- Frank Leighton as Leading aircraftman Bob Bullock.
- C. Denier Warren as Sir Philip
- Michael Shepley as Adjutant
- Hal Gordon as Nobby Clark, mechanic
- Joe Cunningham as Flight Sergeant
- Jack Melford as Lt. Terry, pilot
- Eliot Makeham as Sir Philip's Gardener
- Esma Cannon as Sir Philip's Maid
- O. B. Clarence as Sir Philip's Gardener
- Philip Godfrey as 2nd. Ambulance Man
- Bryan Herbert as RAF Corporal Organising Concert
- Philip Ray as Airman with Shoe
- John Salew as RAF Radio Operator
- Jack Vyvian as Corporal in Ambulance

== Production ==
It’s in the Air was partly produced at the former London Air Park in Feltham, Middlesex. The scenes of the air-raid exercise at the opening of the film are taken from the scenes of an aerial attack in Alexander Korda's Things to Come (1936).

The aircraft featured in It’s in the Air are:

- Hawker Audax (K8334) (K3081)
- Hawker Demon (K3947)
- Armstrong Whitworth Atlas (K1195)
- Blackburn B.2 (G-ADFN), (G-ADLF)
- Bristol Bulldog IIA (K3512)

The film's art direction was led by Wilfred Shingleton.

== Soundtrack ==
- "It's in the Air": Written by Harry Parr-Davies; performed by George Formby and the chorus
- "Our Sergeant Major": Written by George Formby, Harry Gifford and Fred E. Cliffe
- "They Can't Fool Me" Written by George Formby, Harry Gifford and Fred E. Cliffe; performed by George Formby
- "The Bell's of St Mary's": Music by A. Emmett Adams and lyrics by Douglas Furber; performed by an unidentified airman

== Reception ==
In a contemporary review for The New York Times upon the film's American release, critic Bosley Crowther called It's in the Air "little more than a decidedly up-to-date slapstick farce" but wrote: "Folks who won't believe that the British are still able to laugh—those Britishers, that is, who dare to enter movie theatres—should catch it, if for no other reason than to bolster their admiration for these doughty island people. ... As a specimen of war-time culture it should not be overlooked."

In his 1984 book Celluloid Wings: The Impact of Movies on Aviation, aviation-film historian James H. Farmer described It’s in the Air as "[f]ast-paced, typically British slapstick humour." (Note: It’s in the Air was remade as Narcisse (1940), a French comedy that includes the aerial scenes from the British film.)
