= Michael Leader =

British actor

- Michael Leader in EastEnders
- Born: 12 September 1938; Hackney, London, England
- Died: 22 August 2016 (aged 77); England
- Occupation: Actor
- Years active: 1977 - 2016
- Known for: Star Wars (1977) — the "clumsy stormtrooper" (disputed); EastEnders (1985–2016) — Michael the milkman; Doctor Who (1980–1983) various roles

Michael Leader (12 September 1938 – 22 August 2016) was an English actor known for his roles in the British television programmes, notably the soap opera EastEnders, and for a minor part in the 1977 film Star Wars.

== Life ==
Leader was born in Hackney, London, in 1938. He was the son of the jazz band leader Harry Leader.

Michael was married to a Dutch woman and became father of one daughter in 1975.

In his spare time, he liked to be around in the Leyton Orient F.C. Stadium, as he was a fan of the team.

== Career ==
Leader had a number of minor parts and appeared as an extra in a range of television programmes.

His debut film appearance was a minor role as an imperial stormtrooper in the original Star Wars film (1977). Although only on-screen for a matter of seconds, Leader's appearance has attracted particular interest in Star Wars fan culture as he has claimed to be the stormtrooper who bangs his helmeted head on a door frame in a scene on board the Death Star. This was a blooper which was overlooked during editing and has remained part of the film ever since. A rival claim to the part of the "clumsy stormtrooper" has been made by fellow actor Laurie Goode, who has stated that it was he who bumped his head in the scene, not Leader.

Leader's most substantial role was a recurring part as Michael the milkman in the BBC soap opera EastEnders, a part he played since its first episode in 1985. The role was not a speaking part until the 1991 Christmas Eve episode when Frank Butcher (Mike Reid) invites him into the B&B for a drink. Michael says "It's a bit early", and then has a small amount of dialogue with Frank.

Leader also had minor appearances in the television programmes Doctor Who, Red Dwarf, and Keeping Up Appearances.

Leader died on 22 August 2016.

== Filmography ==
=== As actor ===
| Year | Title | Role | Notes |
|---|---|---|---|
| 1977 | Star Wars | Stormtrooper | Film, Uncredited |
| 1980 | Blake's 7 | Rebel / Technician | 2 episodes, Uncredited |
| 1980–1983 | Doctor Who | Soldier / Mutant / Terileptil / Pangol Clone | "The Leisure Hive" (1980); "The Visitation" (1982); "The King's Demons" (1983); "Mawdryn Undead" (1983); Uncredited |
| 1985–2016 | EastEnders | Milkman / Michael | Uncredited; 16 episodes, (final appearance) |
| 1991 | Keeping Up Appearances | Man near reception | Episode: "Golfing with the Major" |
| 1992 | Red Dwarf | Hooded Horde | Episode: "Terrorform", Uncredited |
| 2008 | Harry Hill's TV Burp | Slow Eastenders Extra | Television series |
