= Binkie Stuart =

Scottish child star (1932–2001)

- Born: Elizabeth Alison Fraser; 11 March 1932; Kilmarnock
- Died: 4 August 2001 (aged 69)
- Occupation: film actress

Binkie Stuart (11 March 1932 – 4 August 2001) was a Scottish film actress. During the 1930s she enjoyed brief fame as a child actress and was considered Britain's answer to Shirley Temple.

== Early life ==
She was born as Elizabeth Alison Fraser in Kilmarnock. Her father was a musician and her mother was an actress.

In 1933, Stuart's parents entered her in a "Most Beautiful Baby" contest and won. She then enrolled in dancing classes and began her film career in 1936 when director Monty Banks was looking for a child actress to appear alongside George Formby in Keep Your Seats Please (1936). Despite Stuart's very young age, her dancing abilities landed her the part. "Binkie", the name of the character she played, became her stage name.

== Film career ==
For the next four years, she became a celebrity in the UK and large amounts of merchandise bearing her likeness were sold. She appeared in Our Fighting Navy (1937), Splinters in the Air (1937) and, with Ignacy Jan Paderewski, Moonlight Sonata (1937). She had more substantial roles in popular low-budget releases that imitated Shirley Temple's films. These included Little Miss Somebody (1937), in which she plays an orphan deprived of her inheritance by a villain, Rose of Tralee (1937), as an Irish singer, and Little Dolly Daydream (1938), in which she is a runaway child. Her biggest success was My Irish Molly (1938), in which she co-starred with Maureen O'Hara.

At only 7, her career came to an end. Plans to have Stuart visit the United States and seek acting roles in Hollywood were effectively ended by World War II. Stuart was one of two British child stars who were billed as the "British Shirley Temple". The other was Hazel Ascot, whose career was also ended by the outbreak of war.

== Later life ==
After her film career, she appeared in seaside shows accompanied by her parents, but at 15 refused to embark on a tour of continental Europe. At her father's insistence, she took a job as a receptionist in a dentist's office and by 21 her parents had divorced. Stuart then continued to work as a dental receptionist for years, marrying a television engineer (who died in 1980). Eventually she became a nurse until retiring in the 1990s.

Stuart died on 15 August 2001, aged 69.

== Filmography ==
- Keep Your Seats, Please (1936)
- Splinters in the Air (1937)
- Moonlight Sonata (1937)
- Our Fighting Navy (1937)
- Rose of Tralee (1937)
- Little Miss Somebody (1937)
- My Irish Molly (1938)
- Little Dolly Daydream (1938)
