= Polly Ward =

British actress (1912–1987)

- Born: Byno Poluski; 30 June 1912; Mitcham, Surrey, England
- Died: 23 February 1987 (aged 74); Berkshire, England
- Occupations: Actress and singer
- Spouse: Robert S. Freeman

Polly Ward (born Byno Poluski; 30 June 1912 – 23 February 1987) was an English singer and actress.

== Filmography ==
- The Marriage Business (1927)
- Alf's Button (1930)
- Harmony Heaven (1930)
- His Lordship (1932)
- Kentucky Minstrels (1934)
- The Old Curiosity Shop (1934)
- It's a Bet (1935)
- Show Flat (1936)
- Shipmates o' Mine (1936)
- Annie Laurie (1936)
- Television Talent (1937)
- Feather Your Nest (1937)
- Hold My Hand (1938)
- Thank Evans (1938)
- Sidewalks of London (1938)
- It's in the Air (1938)
- Bulldog Sees It Through (1940)
- Women Aren't Angels (1943)
