= Spelling Bee (game show) =

1938 British radio and TV game show

Spelling Bee is a fifteen-minute United Kingdom radio and live television show, that was the first television game show. Hosted by Freddie Grisewood, and transmitted live from Alexandra Palace at 10pm on 31 May 1938, about four episodes were produced of the television version.

As the title suggests, it was a spelling bee, and in the TV version, contestants competed against well known television stars of the era. The running times varied, with the first episode aired in a 15-minute time-slot, the second and third episodes aired in a 20-minute time-slot, and the fourth and fifth episodes aired in a 30-minute time-slot. The last episode aired on 1 September 1938.

The original Inter Regional Spelling Competition was a one-off radio contest for children, aired on 25 November 1937 at 5.30pm.
