= My Irish Molly =

1938 British musical film by Alex Bryce

- Theatrical release poster
- Directed by: Alex Bryce
- Written by: Alex Bryce; John Argyll; Ian Walker; W.G. Fay (additional dialogue)
- Produced by: John Argyle
- Starring: Binkie Stuart; Maureen O'Hara; Phillip Reed; Tom Burke
- Cinematography: Ernest Palmer
- Edited by: F.H. Bickerton
- Music by: Guy Jones
- Production company: John Argyle Productions
- Distributed by: Associated British Film Distributors
- Release date: 1938
- Country: United Kingdom
- Language: English
- Budget: £13,536

My Irish Molly (also known as Little Miss Molly; U.S. title: My Little Molly) is a 1938 British musical film directed by Alex Bryce and starring Binkie Stuart, Tom Burke and Maureen O'Hara. It was written by Bryce, John Argyll, Ian Walker and W.G. Fay, and concerns a young orphan who runs away from her mean-spirited guardian to live with her aunt.

== Plot ==
In a rural village in Ireland, Molly Martin, an adorable young moppet has been ordered to live with her Aunt Hannah. Molly prefers to live with her other Aunt, the kind widow Mrs O'Shea, the sister of Hannah. Mrs O'Shea's daughter Eileen is in love with Sonny Gallagher who seeks his fortune in New York City as a taxi driver.

An American writer named Bob and his photographer Chuck are guests of the O'Sheas as they write travel stories on Ireland illustrated with Chuck's photographs. When Chuck sends a photograph of Molly to New York she is selected to be the poster girl of an American company named Shamrock. Accompanying Molly is Eileen who seeks to find Sonny who is hiding from her due to his losing his job and being unable to find another one. Sonny returns to Ireland to set things right with Molly, her two Aunts, and Eileen, who has fallen in love with Bob.

== Cast ==
- Binkie Stuart as Molly Martin
- Tom Burke as Sonny Gallagher
- Phillip Reed as Bob
- Maureen O'Hara as Eileen O'Shea
- Maire O'Neill as Mrs. O'Shea
- C. Denier Warren as Chuck
- Maureen Moore as Hannah Delaney
- Franklin Kelsey as Liam Delaney
- Leo McCabe as Corney

== Production ==
The film was shot at Welwyn Studios, with footage of Ireland.

== Songs ==
- "Danny Boy" (traditional), sung by Thomas Burke
- "Eileen Allanagh" (traditional), sung by the cast
- "I'll Be Off to Tipperary in the Morning" (Billy O’Brien and Raymond Wallace), sung by Thomas Burke
- "Farmyard Frolics" (Christine Makgill), sung by Binkie Stuart
- "Kathleen Mavourneen" (Frederick Crouch and Mrs. Crawford)

== US release ==
The film was released in the US in 1940 under the title My Little Molly with scenes of Binkie Stuart removed due to Maureen O'Hara being given top billing due to her American popularity.

== Reception ==
The Monthly Film Bulletin wrote: "This slight and naive story is played against charming Irish backgrounds. The continuity is poor, but compensation for jerkiness may be found in a number of popular Irish airs sung by Tom Burke with the whole cast joining in the choruses. Binkie Stuart is becoming much more assured and less anxious-looking. She is a clever and charming child, and does intelligently what is asked of her. The adult players support her loyally, and are mainly experienced and competent. Maureen O'Hara, the newcomer, has everything to learn about acting. At present her movements are awkward, and she lacks poise."

Kine Weekly wrote: "The story is not exactly profound, neither is the staging particularly ambitious, but the popular and competent supporting players come up to scratch. They do much to cover up narratal, technical and directorial shortcomings, and preserve equilibrium. Appropriate musical ebellishments and pleasing pictorial quality do the rest."

Variety wrote: "Actual story of My Irish Molly is one of those fanciful Cinderella tales which is strong on ballading and weak on plot. ... Binkie Stuart is the much-abused little orphan Molly. Many of her scenes look like a series of screen tests, with the child singing, tap dancing and otherwise aping Shirley Temple. Despite the misdirection, she looks like a possible screen bet under proper tutelage. Dialog is strictly of the old school, mostly blah. Despite faulty recording in many instances, Burke's voice suplies the real lift to the production."
